= Citroën C-Triomphe =

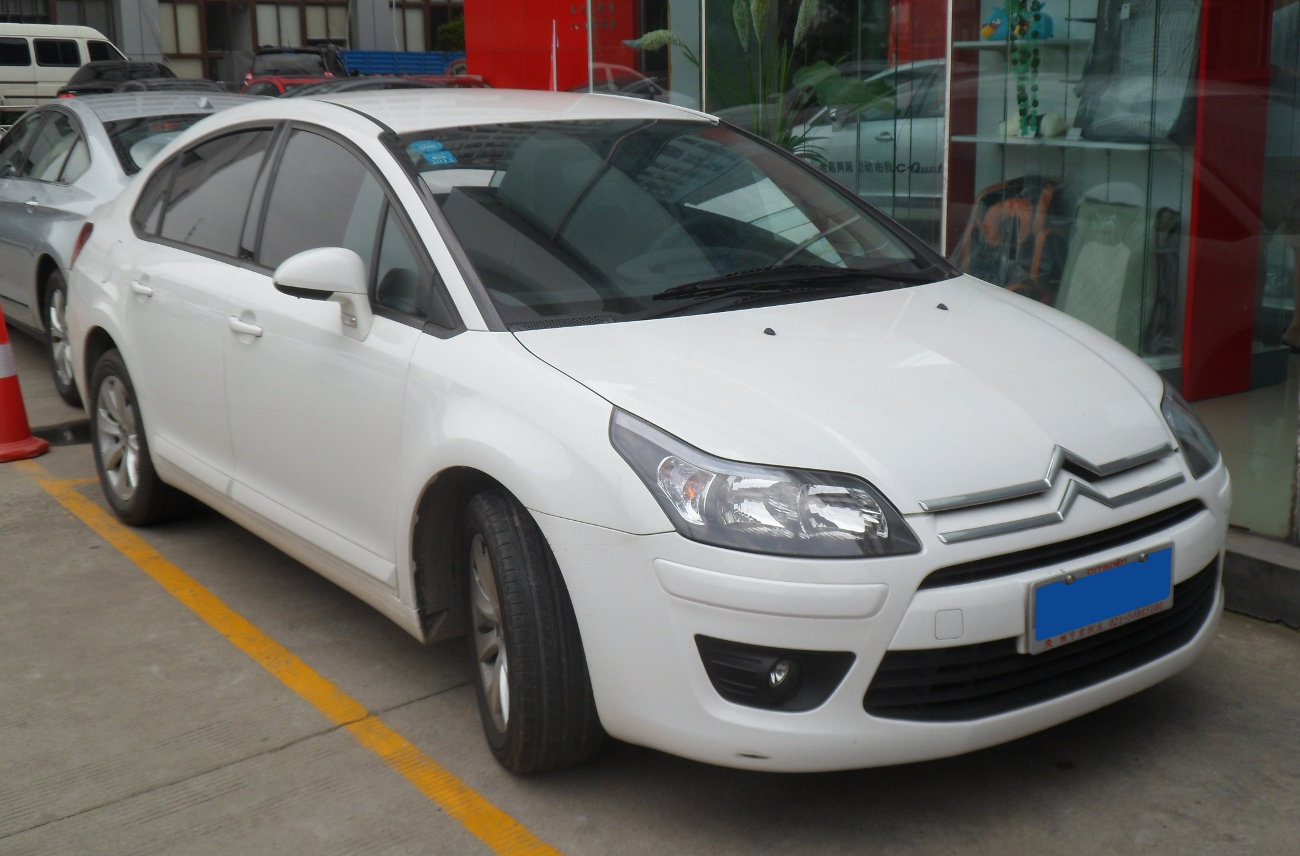
- A white Citroën C-Quatre in Shanghai.

Overview
- Manufacturer: Dongfeng Peugeot-Citroën
- Production: 2006–2016

Body and chassis
- Class: Mid-size (D)
- Body style: 4-door sedan
- Layout: FF layout
- Related: Citroën C4

Powertrain
- Engine: 2.0L I4
- Transmission: 5-speed manual 4-speed automatic

Dimensions
- Wheelbase: 2,710 mm (106.7 in)
- Length: 4,770 mm (187.8 in)
- Width: 1,770 mm (69.7 in)
- Height: 1,510 mm (59.4 in)

Chronology
- Successor: Citroën C4 Lounge

The Citroën C-Triomphe is a mid-size sedan produced for the Chinese market by Dongfeng Peugeot-Citroën, a joint venture between the French PSA Group (Peugeot-Citroën) and the Chinese manufacturer Dongfeng.

== Overview ==
This new model range was designed to supplement other Chinese models in the range such as the Fukang and the Elysée, rather than being any direct replacement.

In April 2007, Citroën announced that the four-door C4 would be built in Argentina. The Argentinian and Brazilian versions are sold as the C4 Pallas in some South American and European markets.

The car is essentially a notchback sedan version of the European C4 model, since the Chinese market prefers traditional three-box sedans over hatchbacks. It did not keep the designation, however, because in Chinese the number "4" is unlucky. The sedan is much larger than the hatchback: its length is 4,770 mm (187.8 in) over the hatchback's 4,260 mm (167.7 in) and its wheelbase measures 2,710 mm (106.7 in) against 2,610 mm (102.8 in) of the hatchback. This caused the C-Triomphe sedan to be classified in large family car class. The C-Triomphe has a number of unique features, such as an integrated air freshener which allows the driver to choose the smell of the interior.

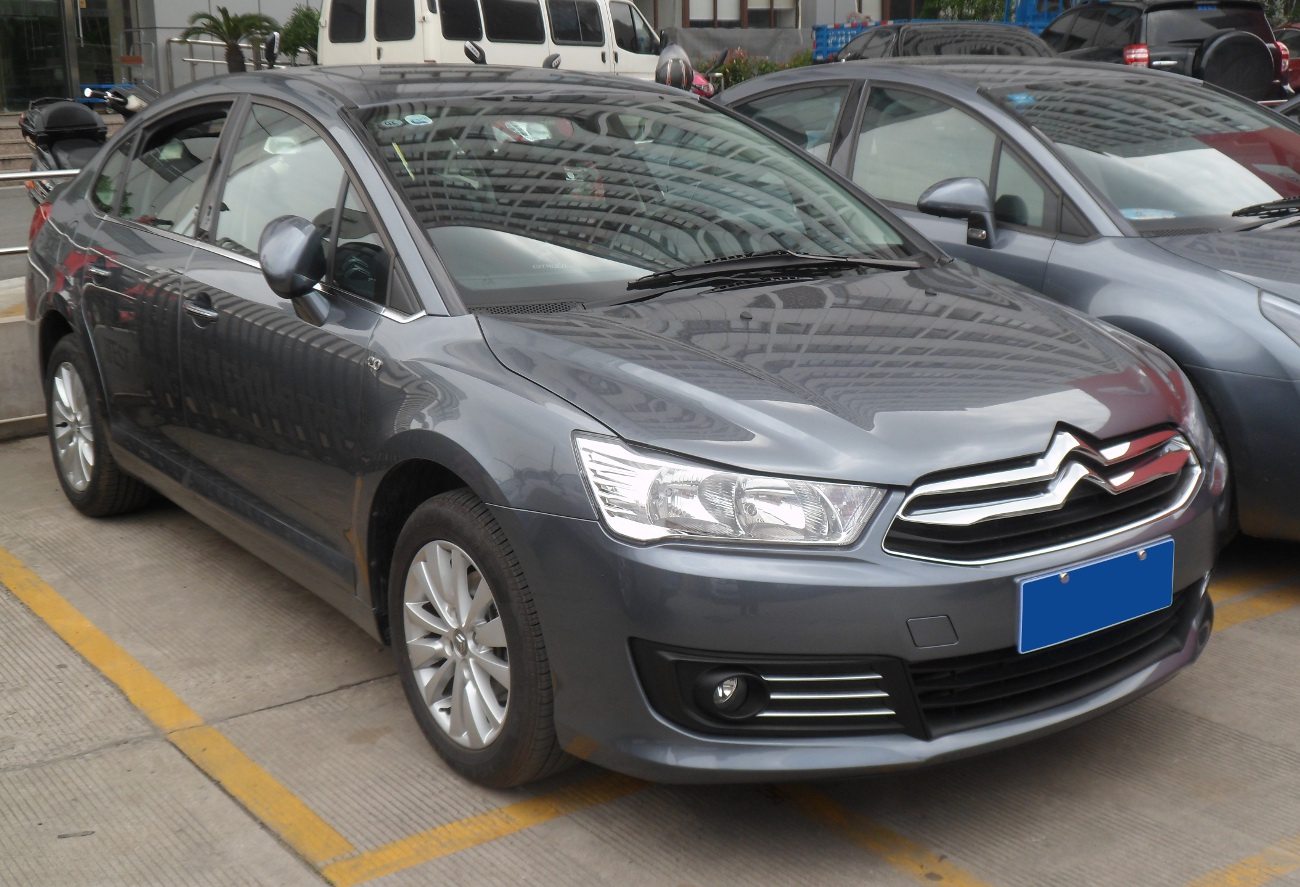
Citroën C-Quatre, the C-Triomphe new evolution

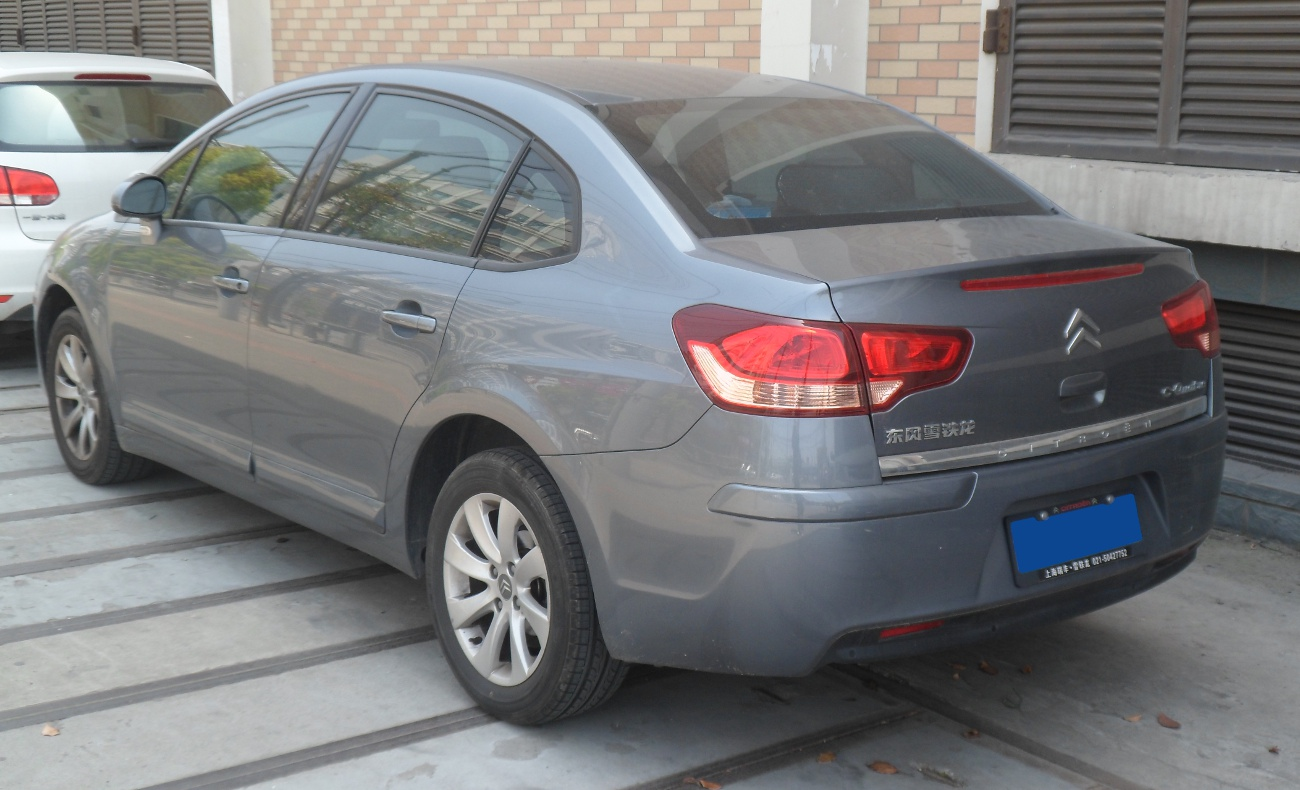
Citroën C-Quatre, the C-Triomphe new evolution

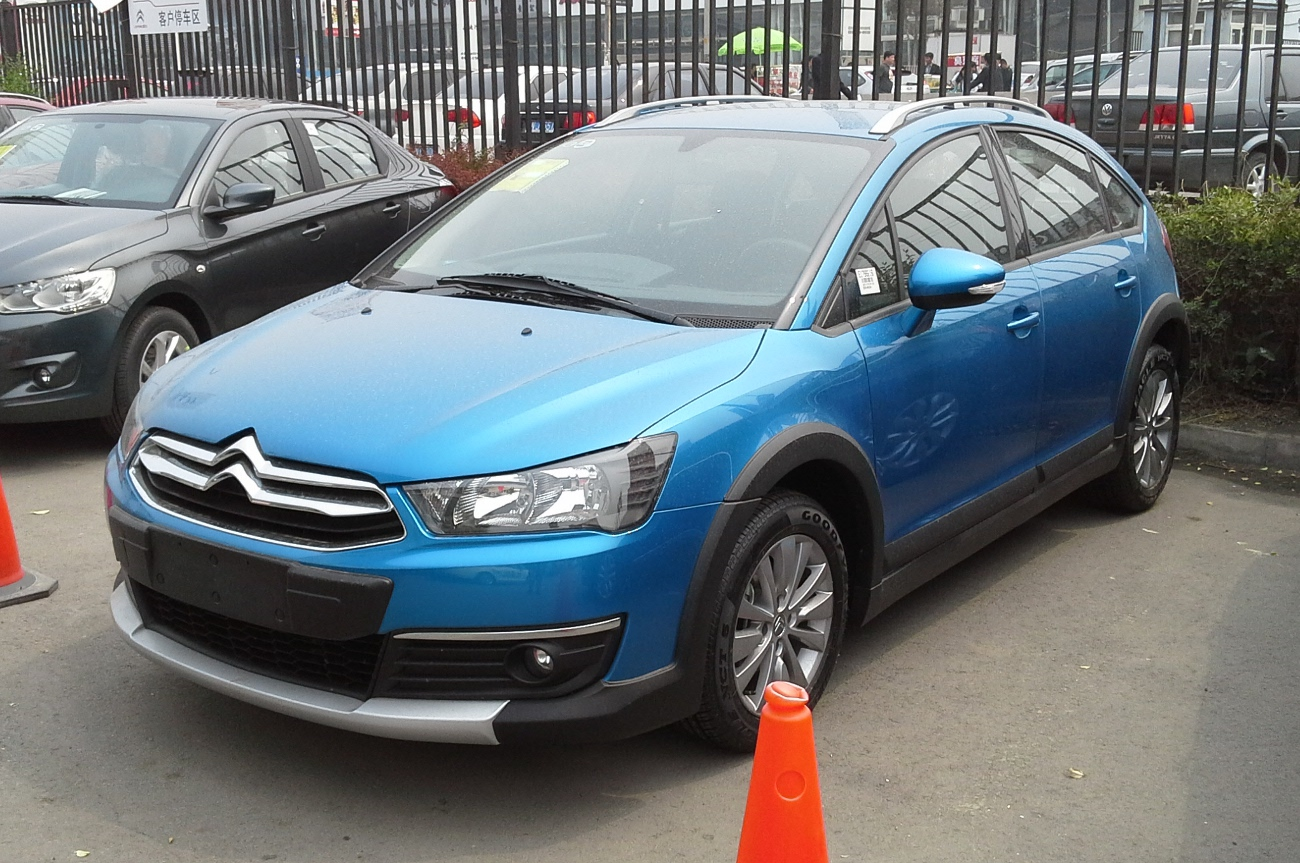
Citroën C-Quatre Cross
