= Dongfeng Peugeot-Citroën =

Chinese automobile manufacturer; joint venture of Dongfeng Motor and Stellantis

- Formerly: Dongfeng Peugeot-Citroën Automobile Co., Ltd. (1992–2021)
- Type: Joint venture
- Industry: Automotive
- Founded: 1992; 34 years ago
- Headquarters: Wuhan, China
- Area served: Mainland China
- Key people: Chen Bin (General Manager)
- Products: Automobiles
- Brands: Citroën; Dongfeng Fengshen; Hedmos; Jeep; Peugeot
- Revenue: ▼CN¥47.397 billion (2016)
- Net income: ▼CN¥1.827 billion (2016)
- Total assets: ▼CN¥38.881 billion (2016)
- Total equity: ▲CN¥14.110 billion (2016)
- Owners: Dongfeng Motor Group (50%); Stellantis (50%)

Chinese name
- Simplified Chinese: 神龙汽车有限公司
- Traditional Chinese: 神龍汽車有限公司
- Literal meaning: Divine Dragon Automobile Limited Company
Transcriptions
Standard Mandarin
- Hanyu Pinyin: Shénlóng Qìchē Yǒuxiàn Gōngsī

Dongfeng Citroën
- Simplified Chinese: 东风雪铁龙
- Traditional Chinese: 東風雪鐵龍
- Literal meaning: East Wind - Citroën
Transcriptions

Dongfeng Peugeot
- Simplified Chinese: 东风标致
- Traditional Chinese: 東風標致
- Literal meaning: East Wind - Peugeot
Transcriptions
- Website: dpca.com.cn
- Footnotes figures obtained from Dongfeng Motor Group's annual report; DPCA's annual report was not disclosed

Dongfeng Peugeot-Citroën, formerly Dongfeng Peugeot-Citroën Automobile Co., Ltd. (DPCA) from 1992 to 2021, is an equally owned Chinese joint venture between the automobile manufacturers Dongfeng Motor Corporation and Stellantis (known as PSA Peugeot Citroën at the time of formation). Based in Wuhan, capital of Hubei province, it manufactures Peugeot and Citroën models for sale in China.

The Citroën brand received one of the highest scores in a 2014 customer satisfaction survey done by JD Power in China.

Not all Stellantis products sold in China were sold or manufactured by its joint venture with Dongfeng; DS Automobiles models were once the domain of the former Changan PSA joint venture with Changan Automobile.

DPCA also produces Dongfeng Fengshen (Fengshen)-branded consumer vehicles in the same factories that manufacture Stellantis models, including models based on Stellantis platforms.

== History ==
The Peugeot and Citroën brands separately tried to enter the China market in the 1980s. Citroën sold the CX model in 1984, and it even appeared in a Chinese film. At the time, Citroën was competing with Volkswagen for the "large car" contract with SAIC Motor, and Volkswagen won, investing $2 Billion in the China market from 1984 to 1998. Peugeot also saw lackluster results. In 1985, it established a joint venture with the government of Guangzhou, Guangzhou Peugeot Automobile Company, which built the Peugeot 505 and was defunct by 1997.

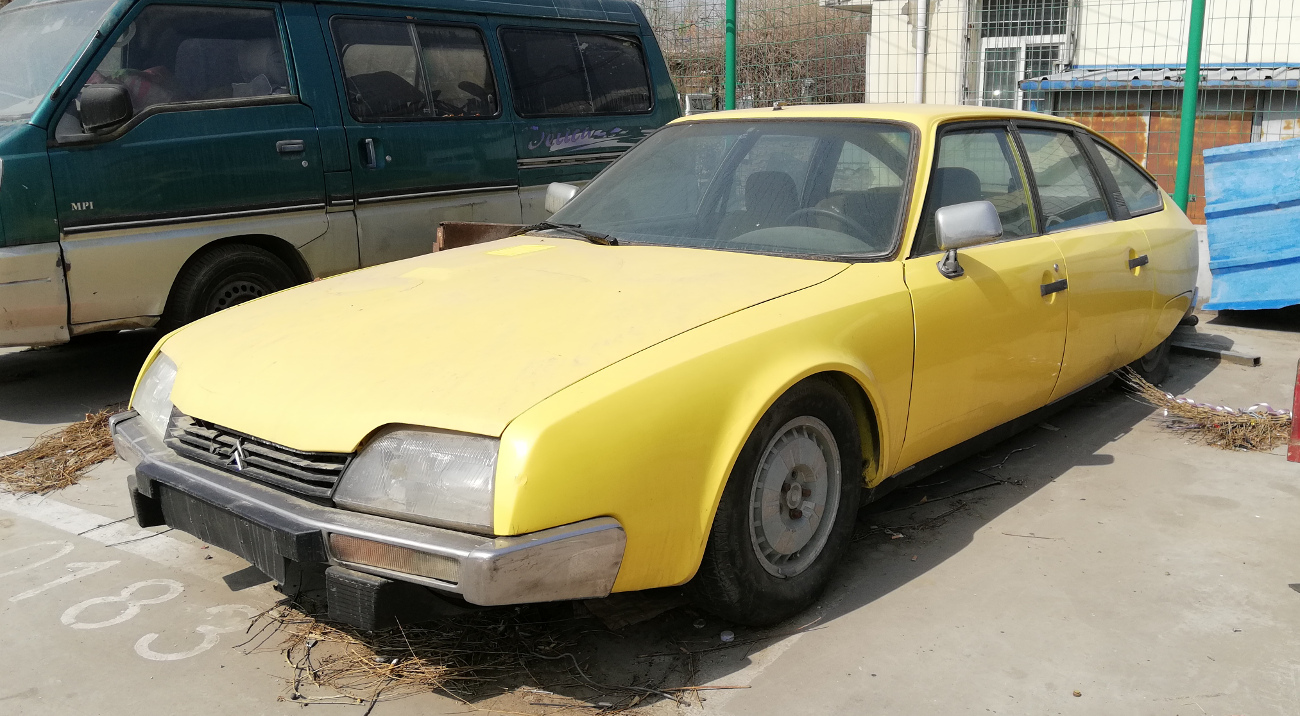
1984 Citroën CX in Beijing

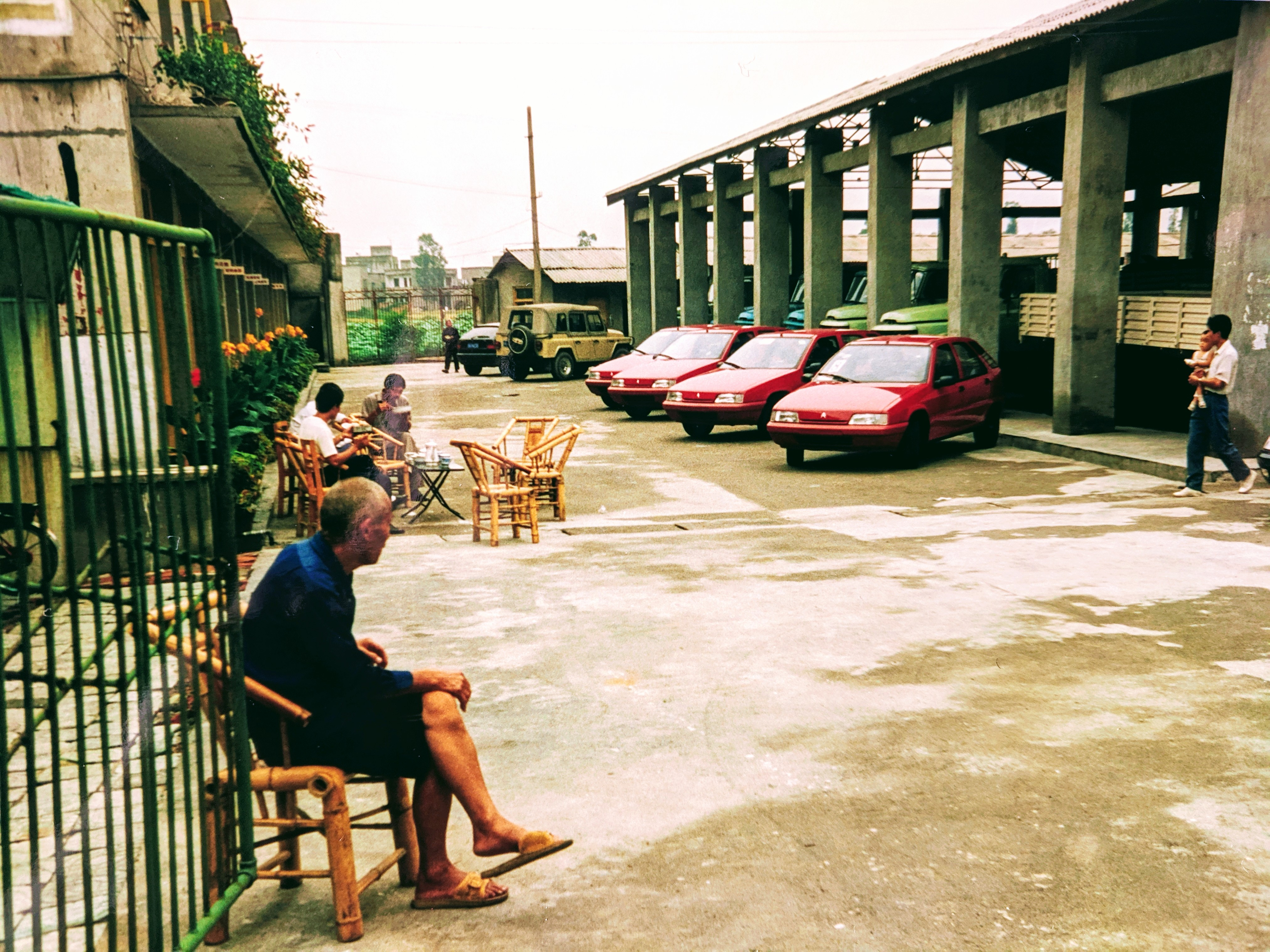
1994 Citroën ZX Fukang models for sale - made by truck manufacturer Second Automobile Works (第二汽车制造厂) through Dongfeng Peugeot-Citroën joint venture

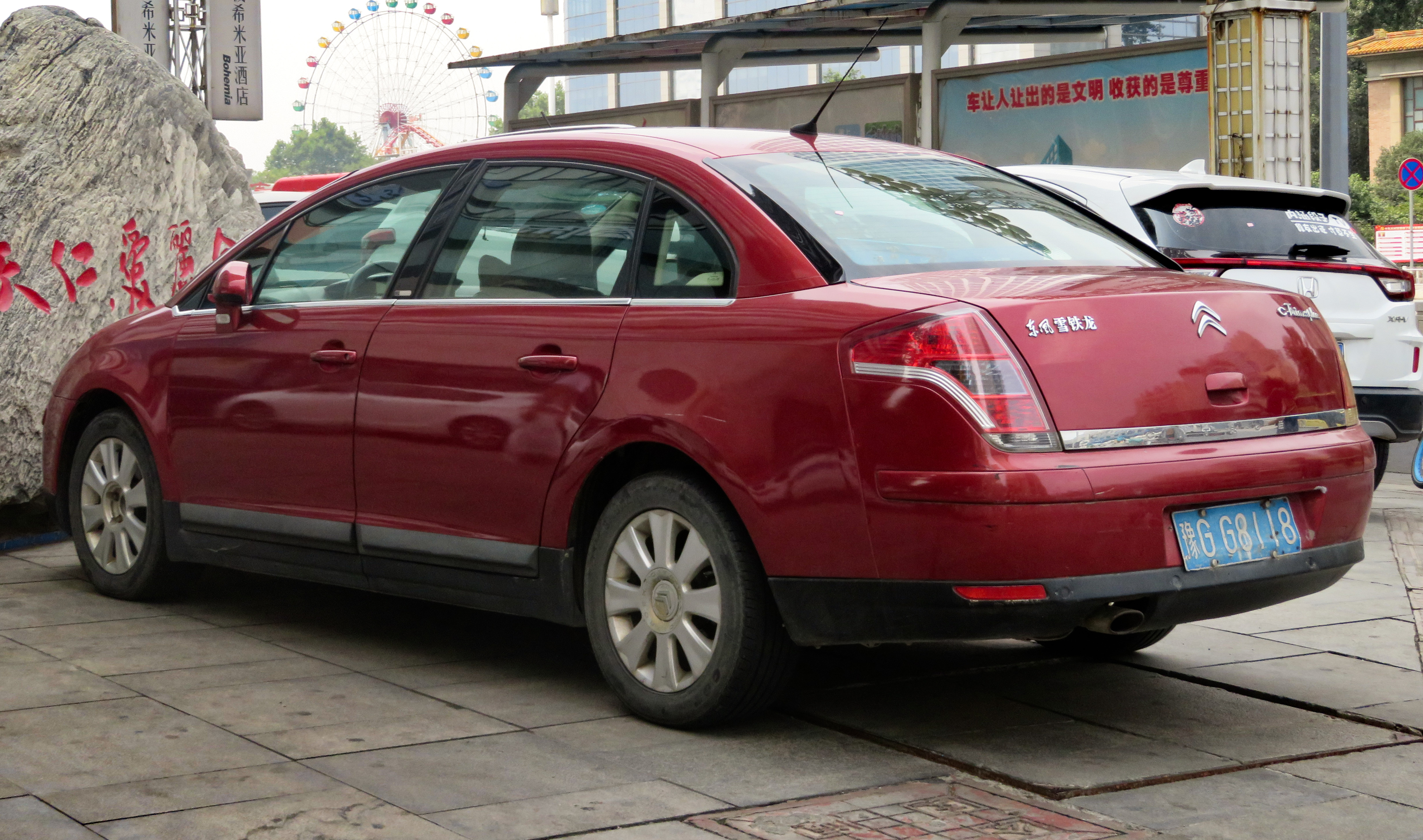
2007 Citroën C-Triomphe Luoyang, Henan province, China

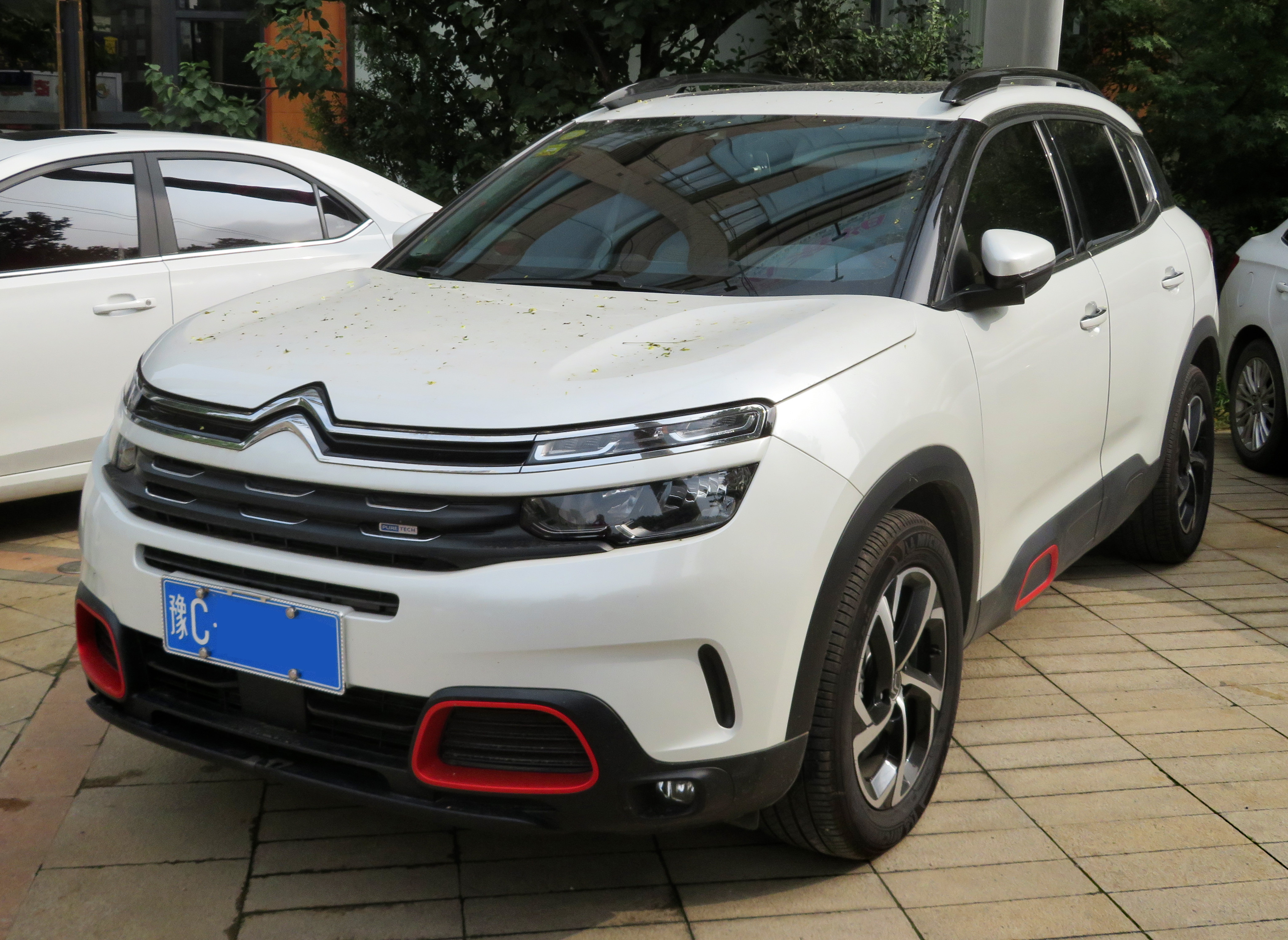
2018 Citroën C5 Aircross

The current Dongfeng Peugeot-Citroën comes from a second chance at market entrance for Citroën provided by 'Second Auto Works' (Dongfeng), in 1992. Realizing it lacked a consumer product line, state-owned vehicle maker Dongfeng Motor Corporation initially approached Toyota in the hopes of establishing a joint venture but was rebuffed leading to the same offer being afforded Citroën. Talks were reported to have taken place in Paris as early as the last 1980s with agreement reached in 1990. However, the project was delayed by two years due to French government resistance following the Tiananmen Square massacre, and it only came off the ground in 1992. Initially referred to as Dongfeng Citroën Automobile Company (DCAC), this joint venture company situated itself in Wuhan. Its first product was a hatchback built from semi-complete knock-down kits, the ZX Fukang, and by 1996 production capacity had reached 150,000 units/year with a second offering, the Fukang 988 sedan, being added in 1998. The project may not have seen great success due to a limited product line and delays from the beginning. In addition, early reliance on Shanghai's industrial base (and with it stretched supply chains) for locally sourced parts may have proved a hindrance; at the very least to the development of Wuhan's own industrial cluster. As of 1997, DCAC counted amount its component suppliers 80% more Shanghai firms than those based in Wuhan, and in the early 2000s easily 50% of locally sourced parts continued to come from Shanghai.

In 2002, the first Peugeot-branded product was introduced and the JV was renamed Dongfeng Peugeot-Citroën Automobile (DPCA). That same year saw the joint venture held with equal equity between its French and Chinese parents, but it wasn't until 2004 that Chinese and French banks relaxed their grip on the firm and true 50% ownership stakes were each taken by Dongfeng and PSA Peugeot Citroën.

While most current offerings are versions of cars available in other markets, some vehicles have been tailored to better suit local demand such as changing hatchbacks to three-box designs. At least one car, sold under the name Citroën C2, appears to have been reworked extensively; confusingly the Chinese version C2 seems to have been a rebadged Peugeot model—not the "actual" Citroën C2.

On March 3, 2025, DPCA launched the Hedmos NEV brand, with the first model, the Hedmos 06, commencing deliveries in May.

== Operations ==
=== Production bases and facilities ===
As of 2010, the joint venture has three production bases—all in Hubei province. A fourth was set to become operational c. 2016 in Chengdu, Sichuan province, increasing production capacity by 300,000 units per year. With the completion of this factory, total yearly production capacity will approach one million whole vehicles.

A Xiangyang production base makes engines with capacity in excess of one million, yearly, and has been operational since 1996.

Stellantis has two facilities in Shanghai—an R&D center (the China Tech Center) and a design center.

As of 2023, only one production plant is still in operation in Wuhan (Plant 3), with Plant 1 being converted to commercial development and Plant 2 being sold to Dongfeng-Honda for a new electric vehicle plant. The Chengdu plant is also in operation.

=== Dealer network ===
Its dealer network boasts nearly 300 Citroën shops in over 200 Chinese cities and about 170 Peugeot showrooms (other sales and service stores that carry and cater to Peugeots do exist). As of 2010, imported models are also sold although by a separate, wholly PSA-owned subsidiary, Peugeot Citroën (China) Automotive Trade Co Ltd. It's possible the situation has changed as of 2015 since in that year Groupe PSA signed an agreement with Dongfeng to sell some imports.

=== Corporate Leadership ===
- Liu Weidong (2001–2011)
- Maxime Picat (2011–2012)
- Jean-Philippe Imparato (2016)
- Jean-Christophe Marchal (2018–2019)
- Massimo Roserba (2019–2020)
- Chen Bin (2020–present)

== Ownership ==
Ownership of the joint venture has evolved since its establishment in 1992. In 2000, ownership was: 31%, Dongfeng Motor Corporation; 39%, Chinese banks; 26.9%, PSA Peugeot Citroën; 3.1%, international banks. In 2002, both Dongfeng and PSA Peugeot Citroën took equal 32% shares, and by 2004 they had bought out the remaining equity stakes held by banks resulting in each vehicle-maker holding 50% ownership of the joint venture. After the IPO, the stake held by Dongfeng Motor Corporation was transferred to Dongfeng Motor Group.

In a rare move for the industry, 2014 saw Dongfeng Motor Group take a 14% stake in the then-ailing PSA Peugeot Citroën, a parent company of DPCA.

== Sales figures ==
Year	Vehicle sales
1996	7,200
1997	28,000
1998	33,400
1999	44,300
2000	52,000
2001	53,200
2002	85,100
2003	103,100
2004	89,100
2005	140,400
2006	201,318
2007	207,500
2008	189,162
2009	272,000
2010	376,000
2011	404,437
2012	436,500 (Note: 2012-2014 sales figures may conflate DPCA figures with those of PSA's other China JV, Changan PSA, which had a 200,000 units/year production capacity as of 2015. "PSA Peugeot Citroën in China (a PSA Press Kit)". groupe-psa.com. PSA Peugeot Citroën. April 2015. Archived from the original on 2016-06-14.)
2013	550,500
2014	734,000
2015	719,000
2016	597,873
2017	377,547
2018	253,000
2019	113,600
2020	49,700
2021	100,600
2022	127,000
2023	70,417
2024	56,448

== Products ==
=== Current ===
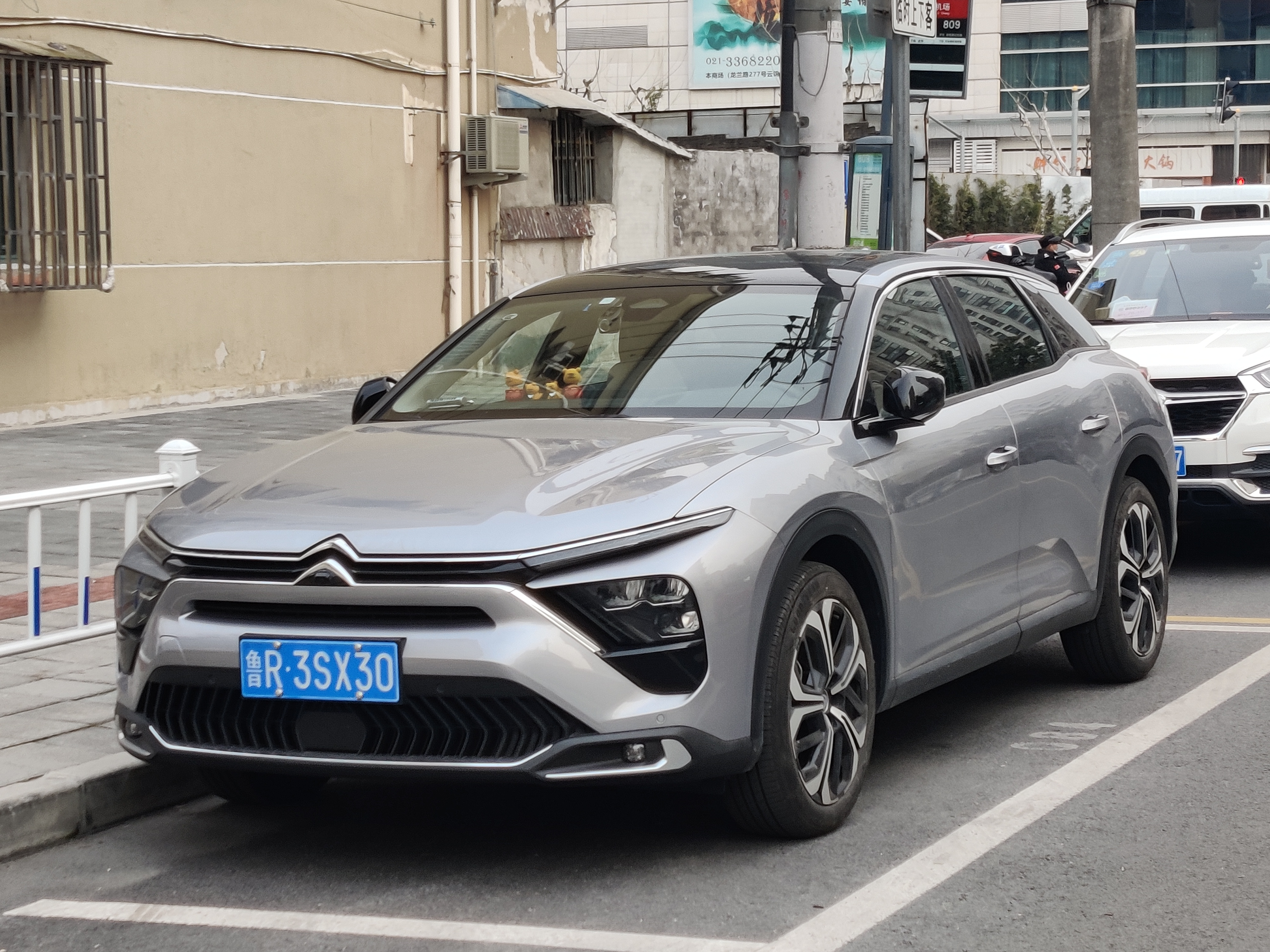
Citroën C5 X

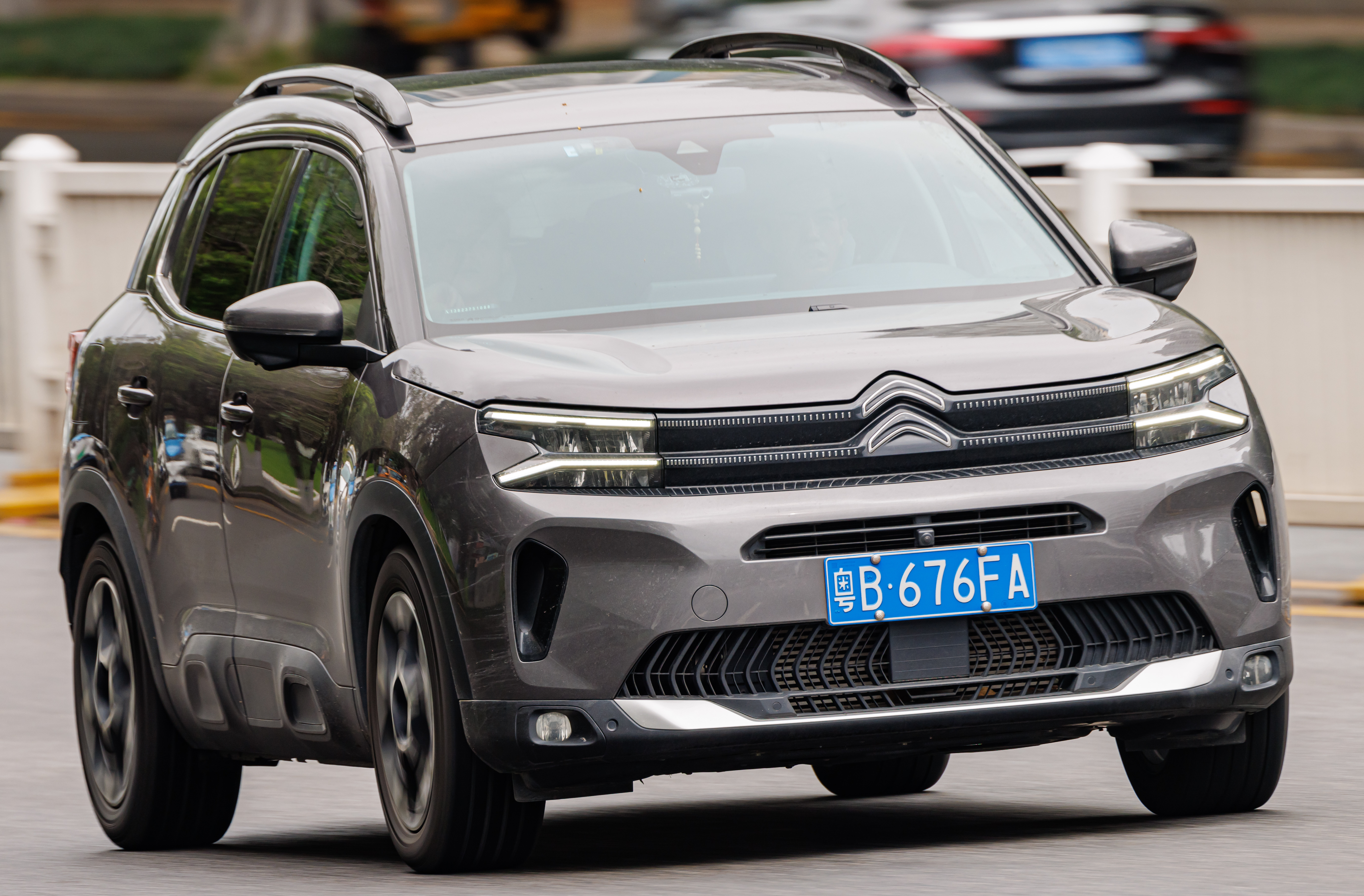
Citroën C5 Aircross (380THP)

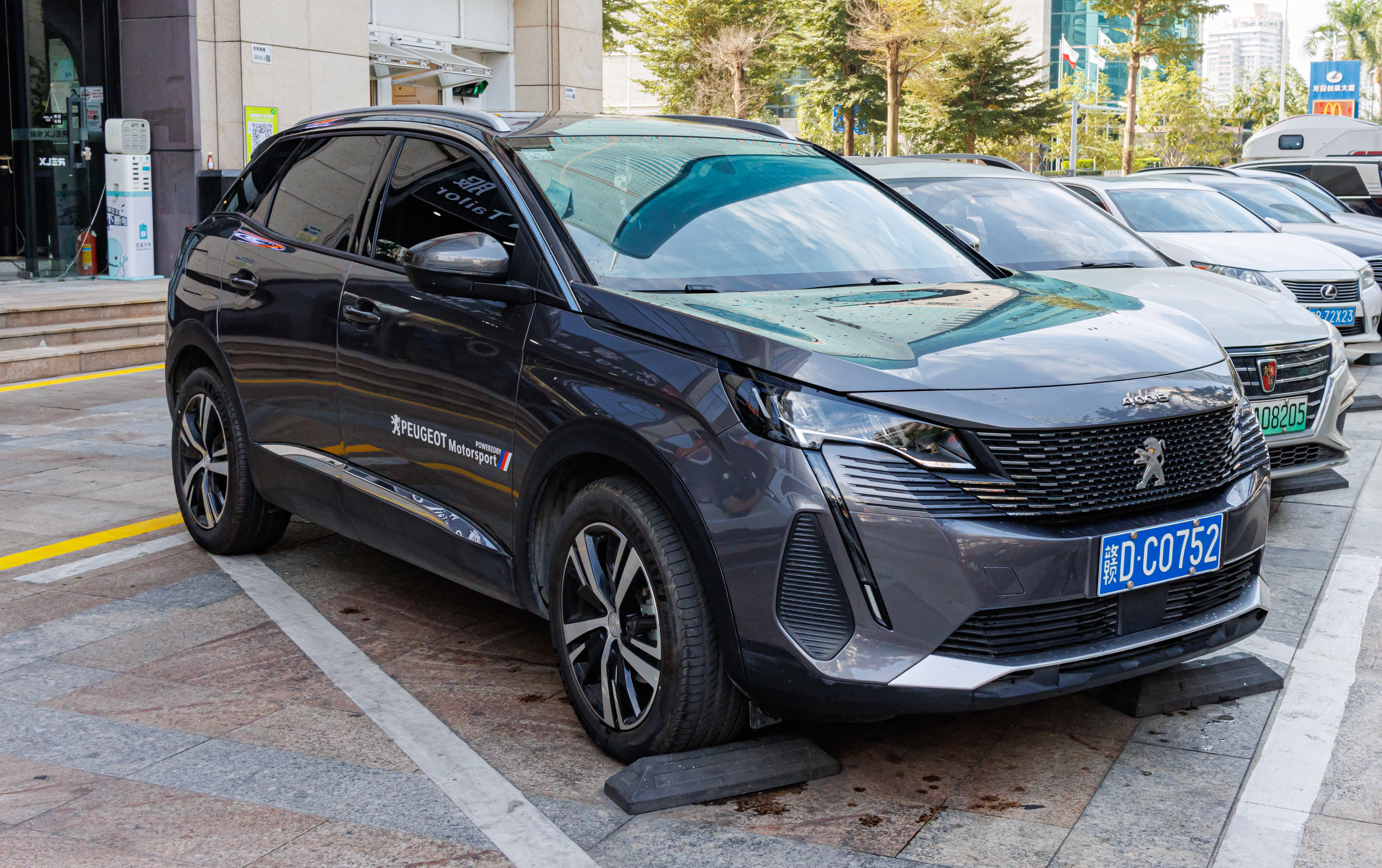
Peugeot 4008

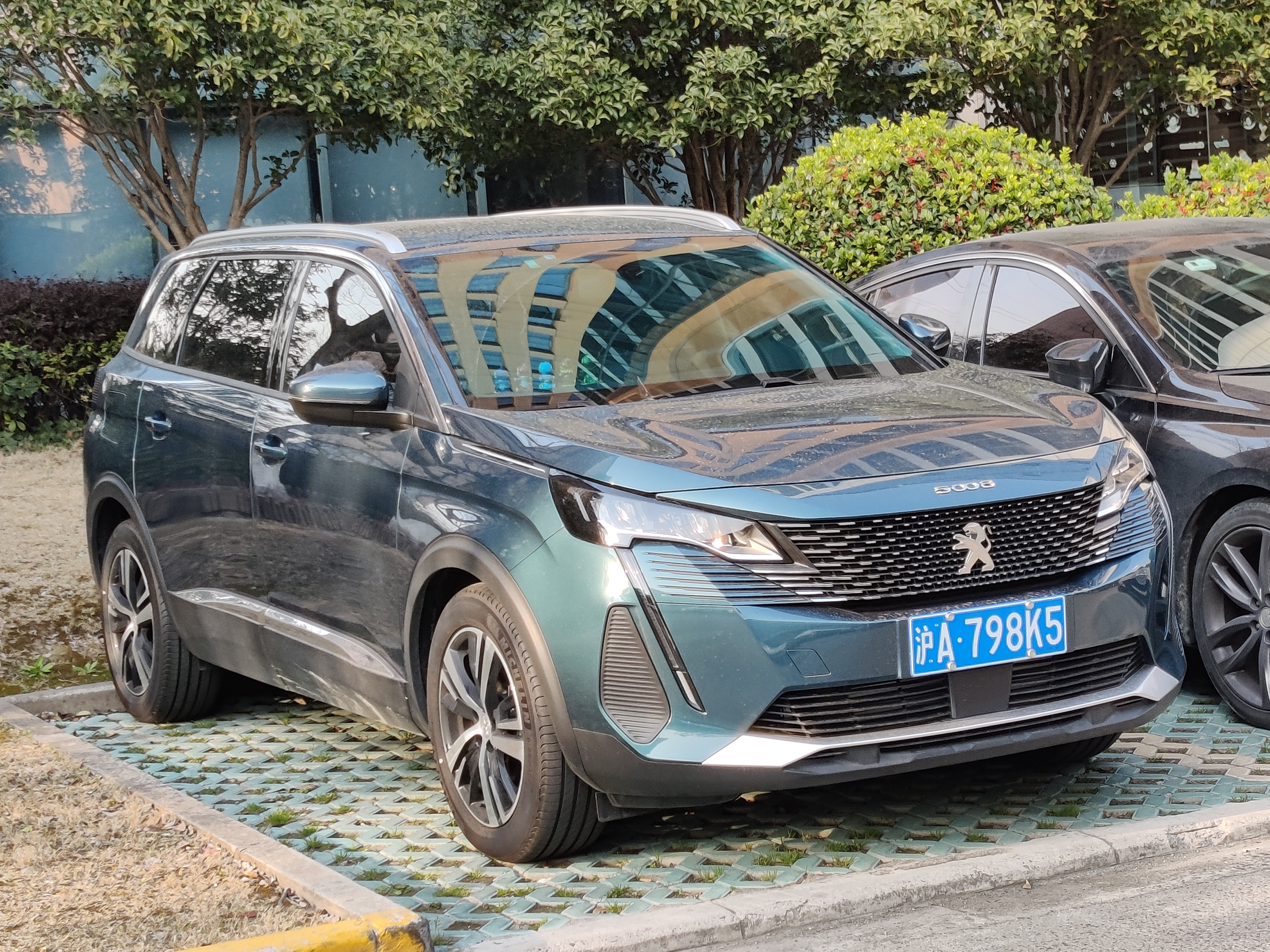
Peugeot 5008

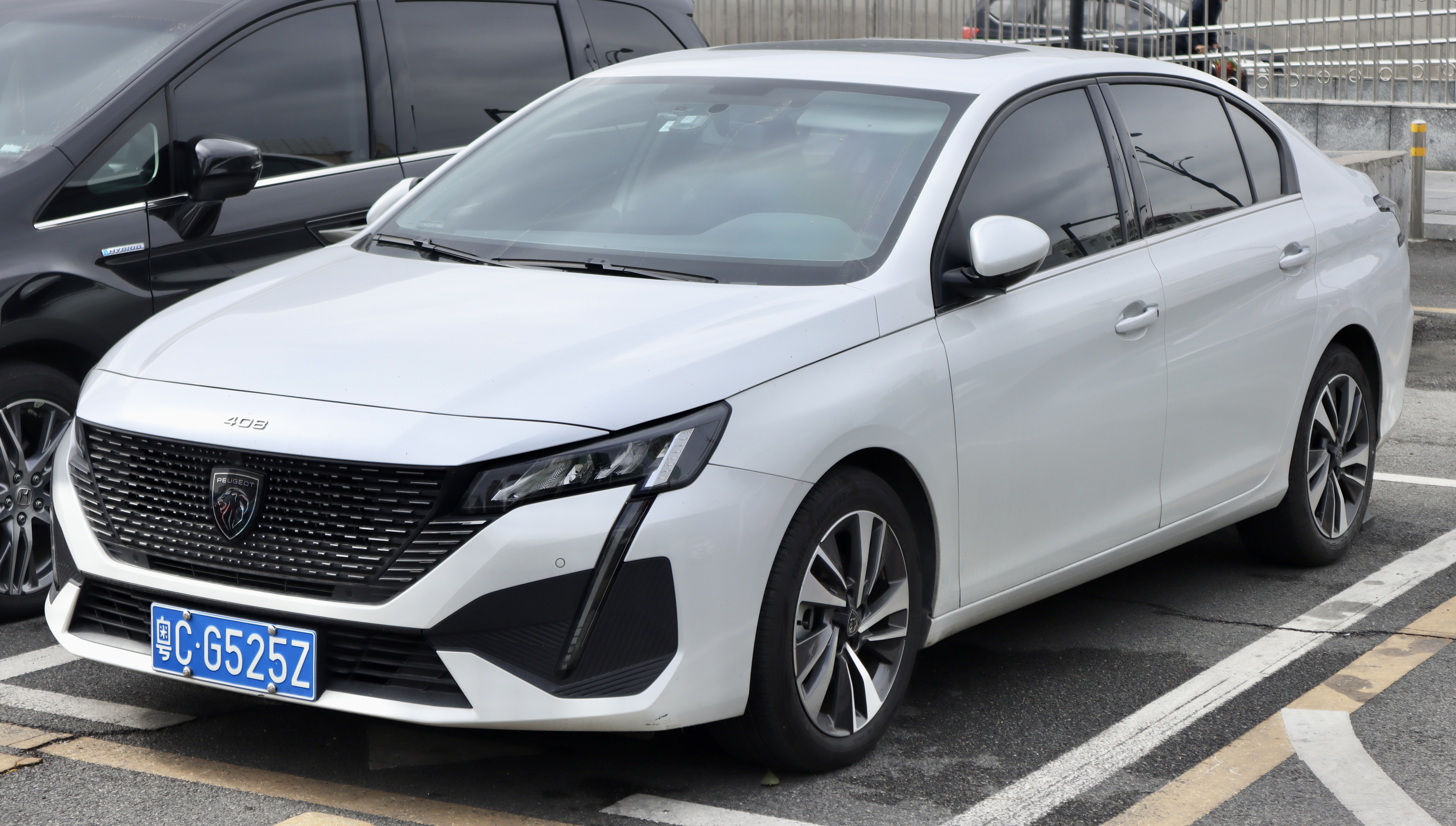
Peugeot 408 Sedan

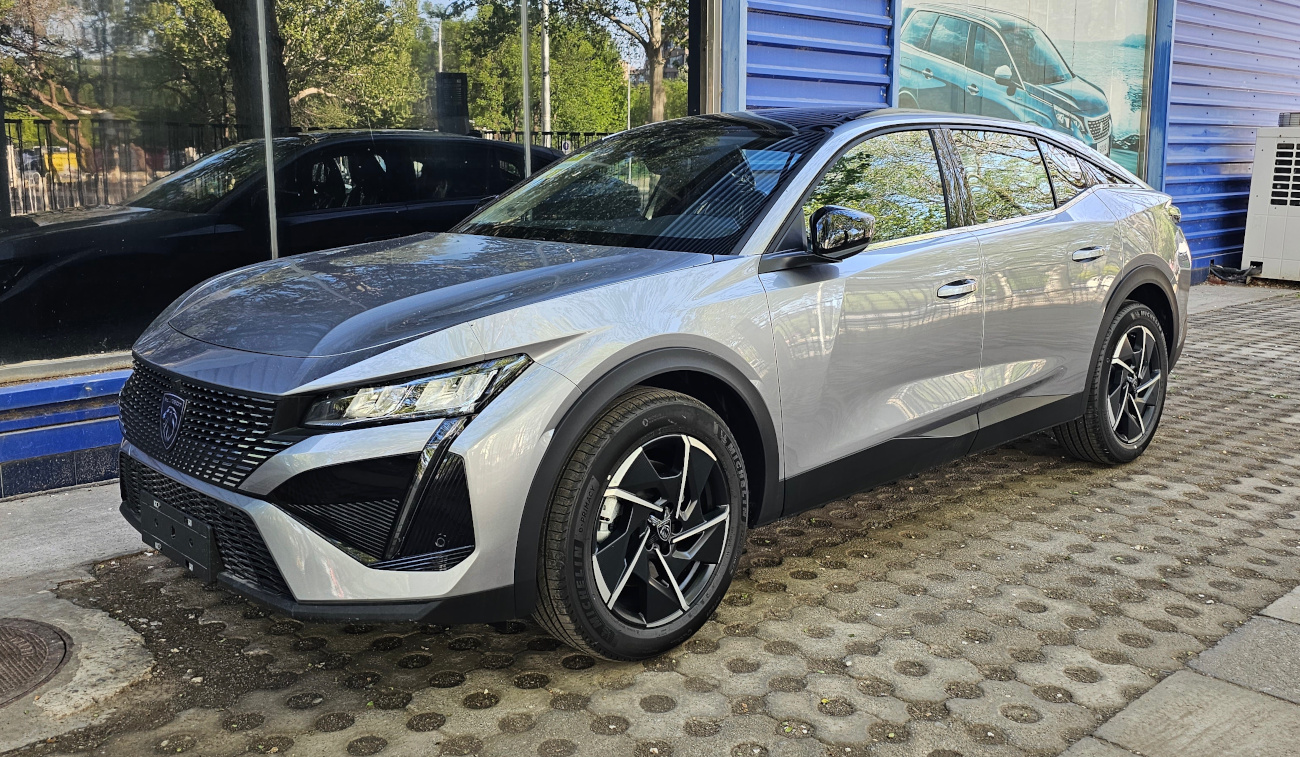
Peugeot 408 X

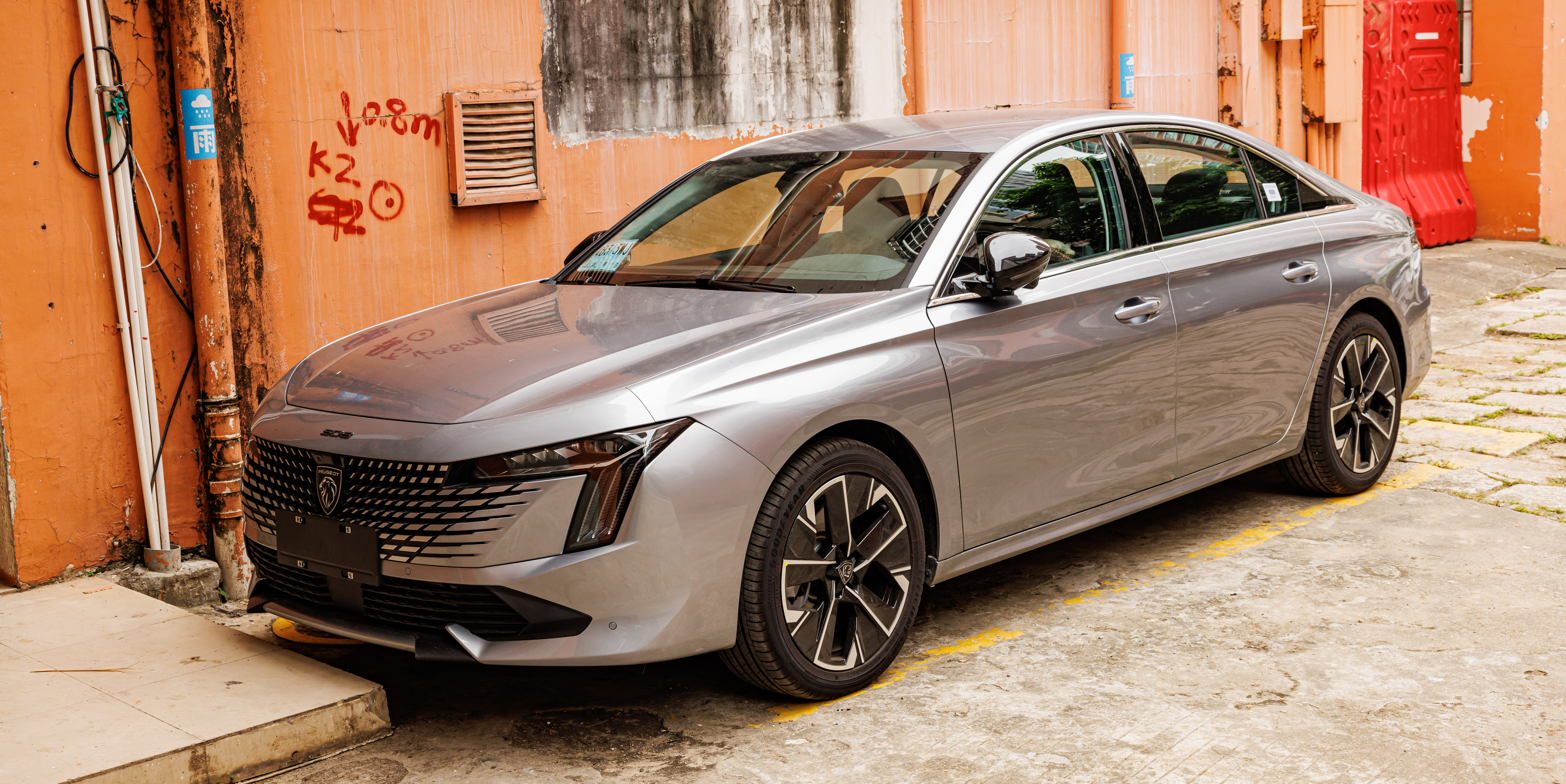
Peugeot 508L

=== Discontinued ===
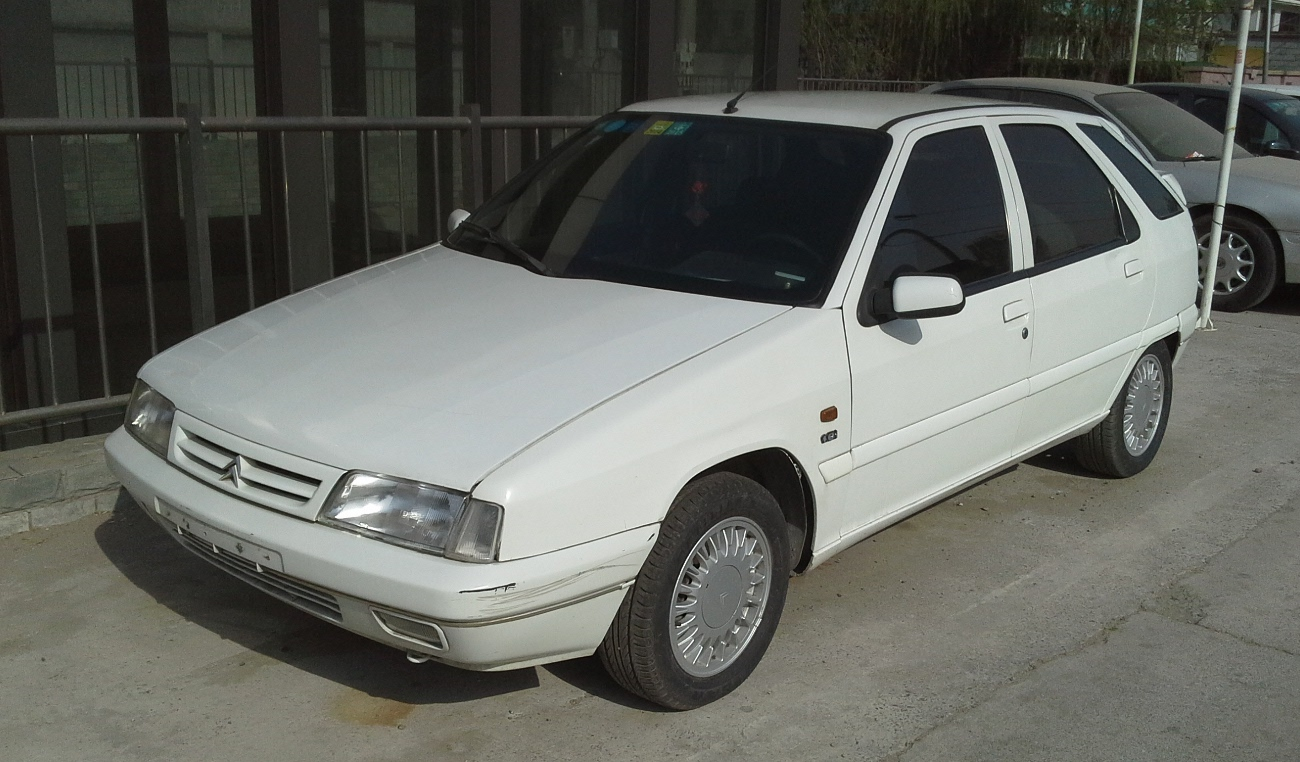
Citroën Fukang

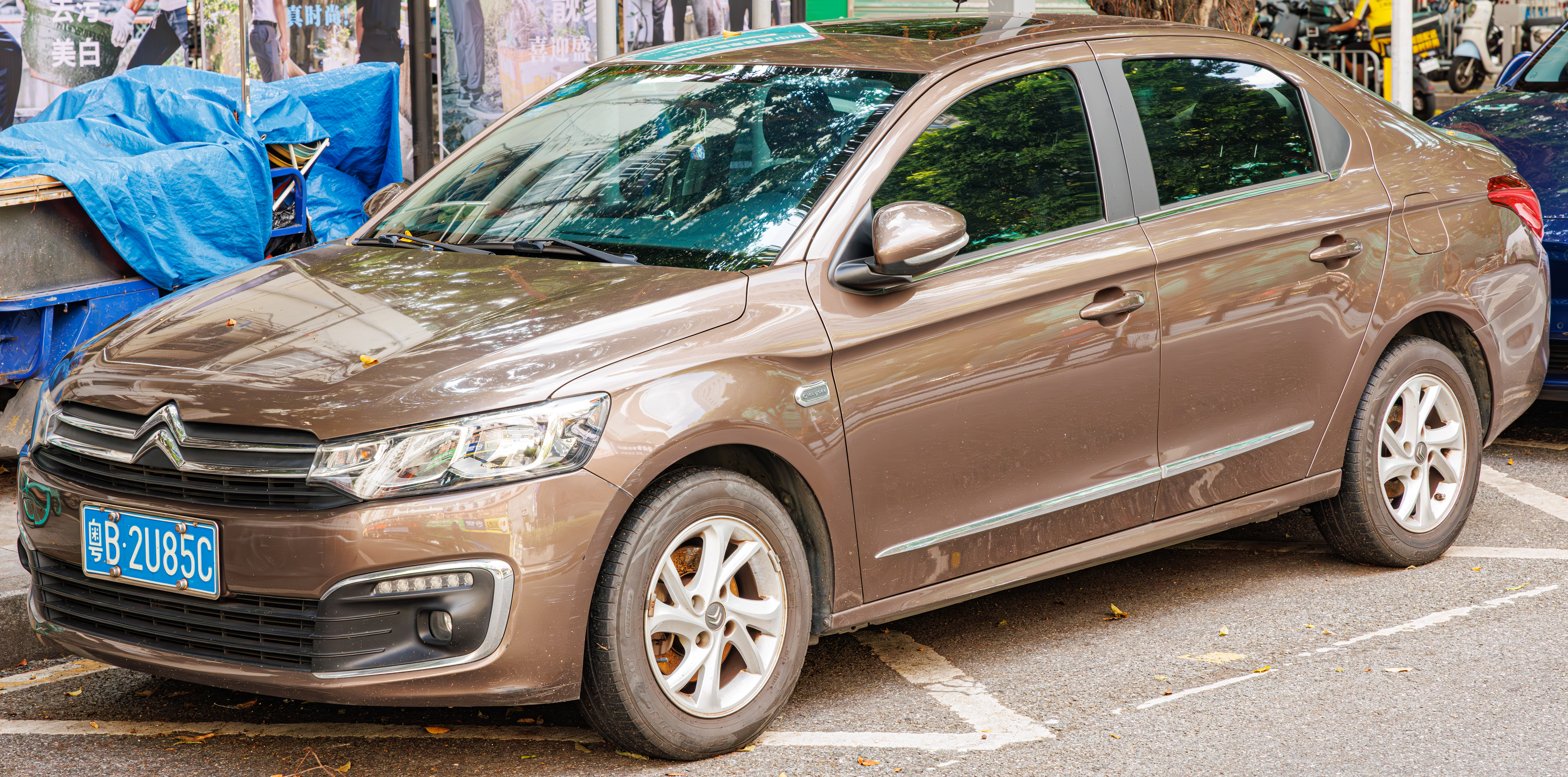
Citroën C-Elysée

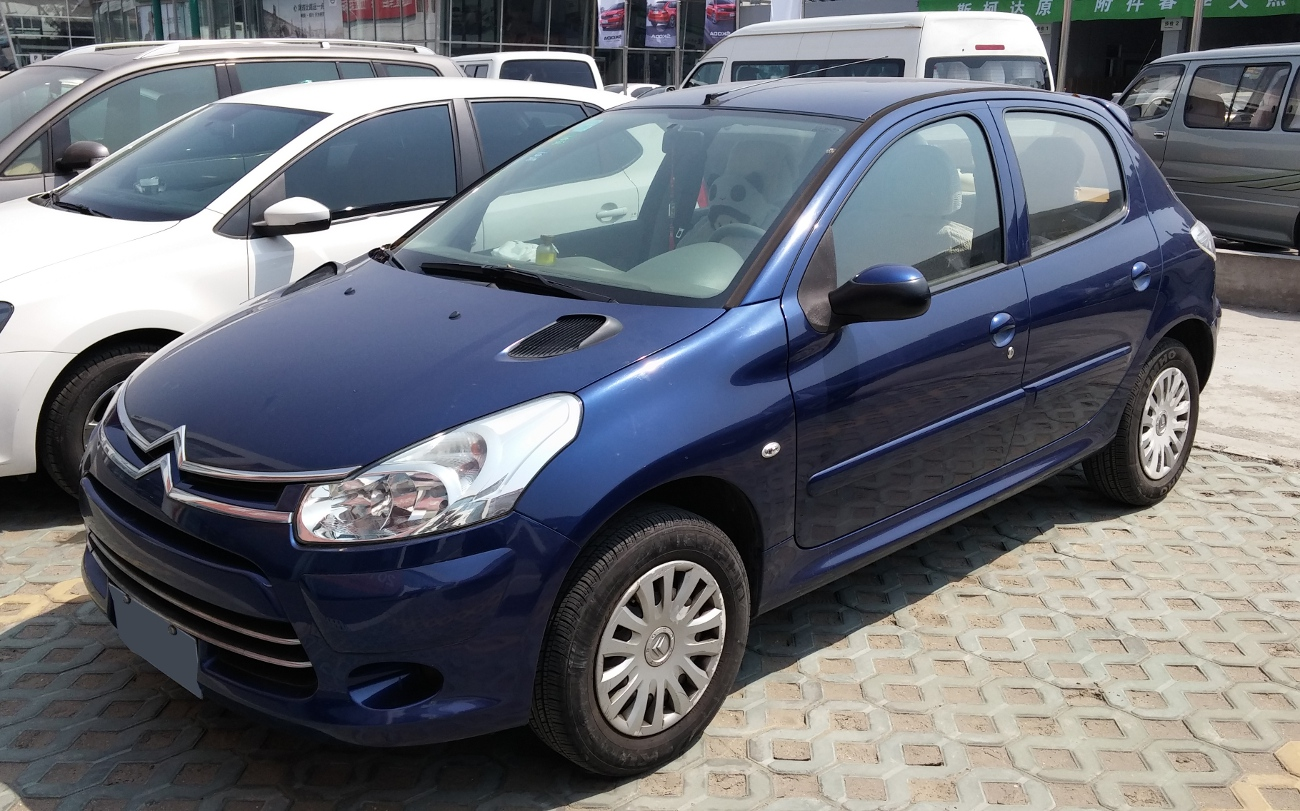
Citroen C2

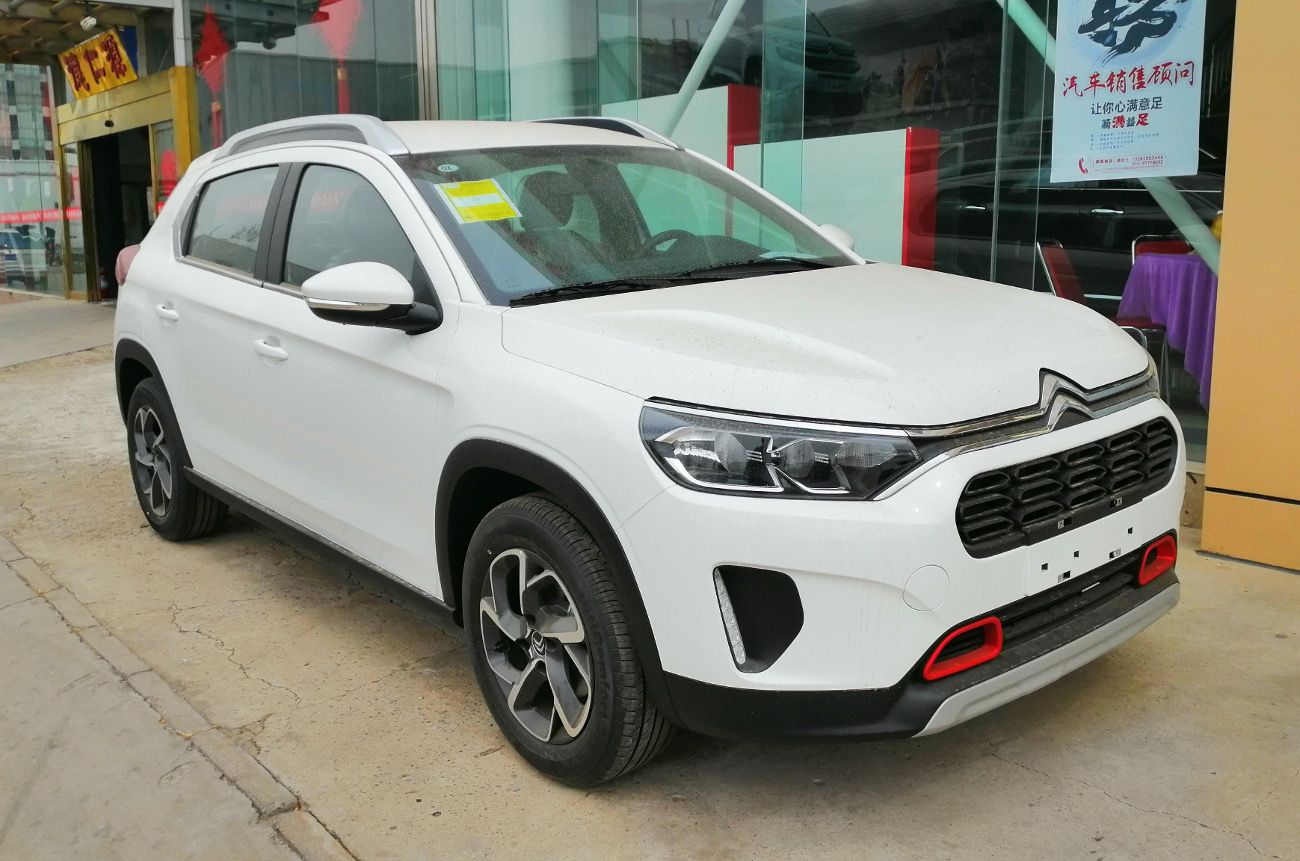
Citroën C3-XR

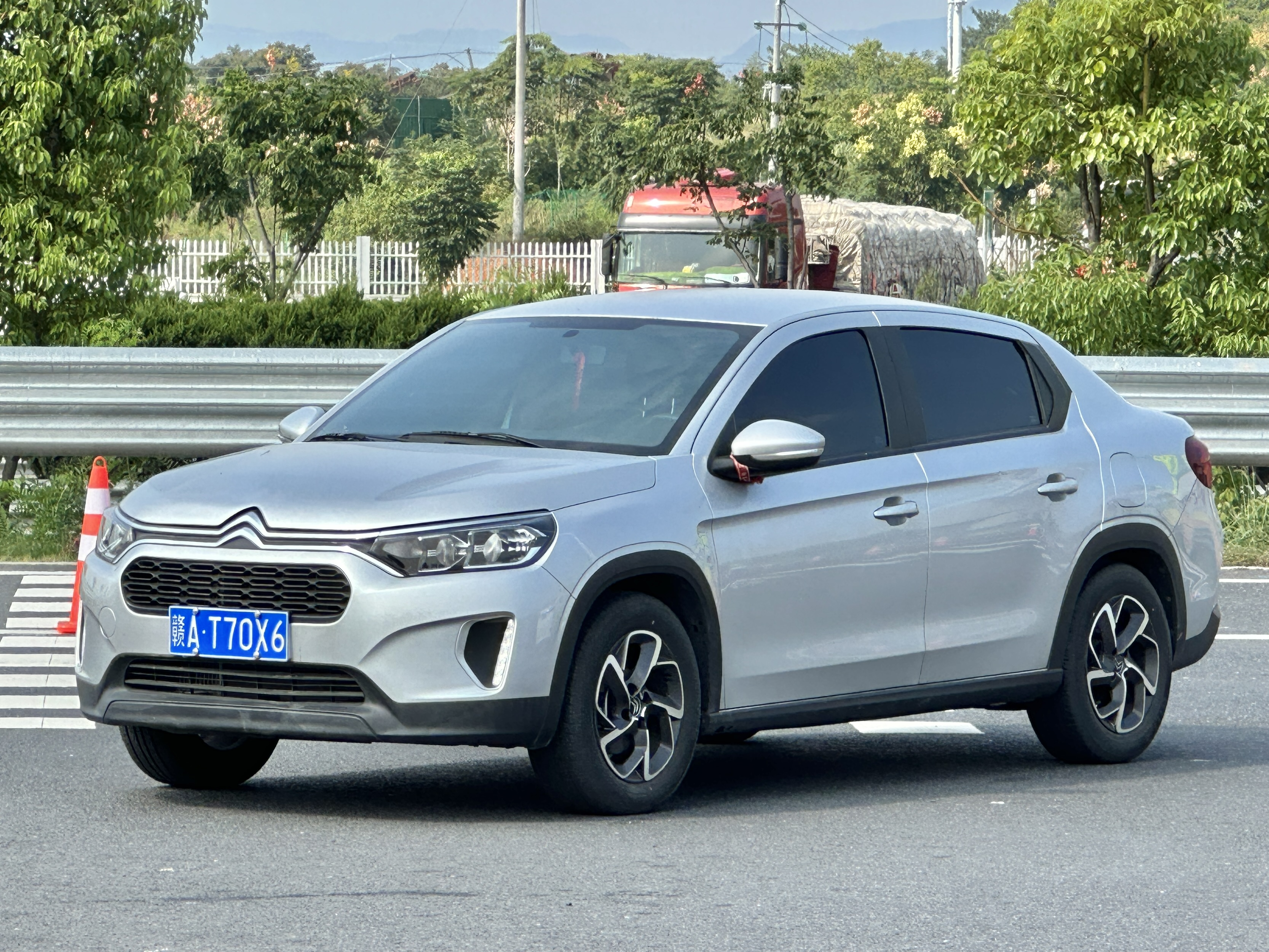
Citroën C3L

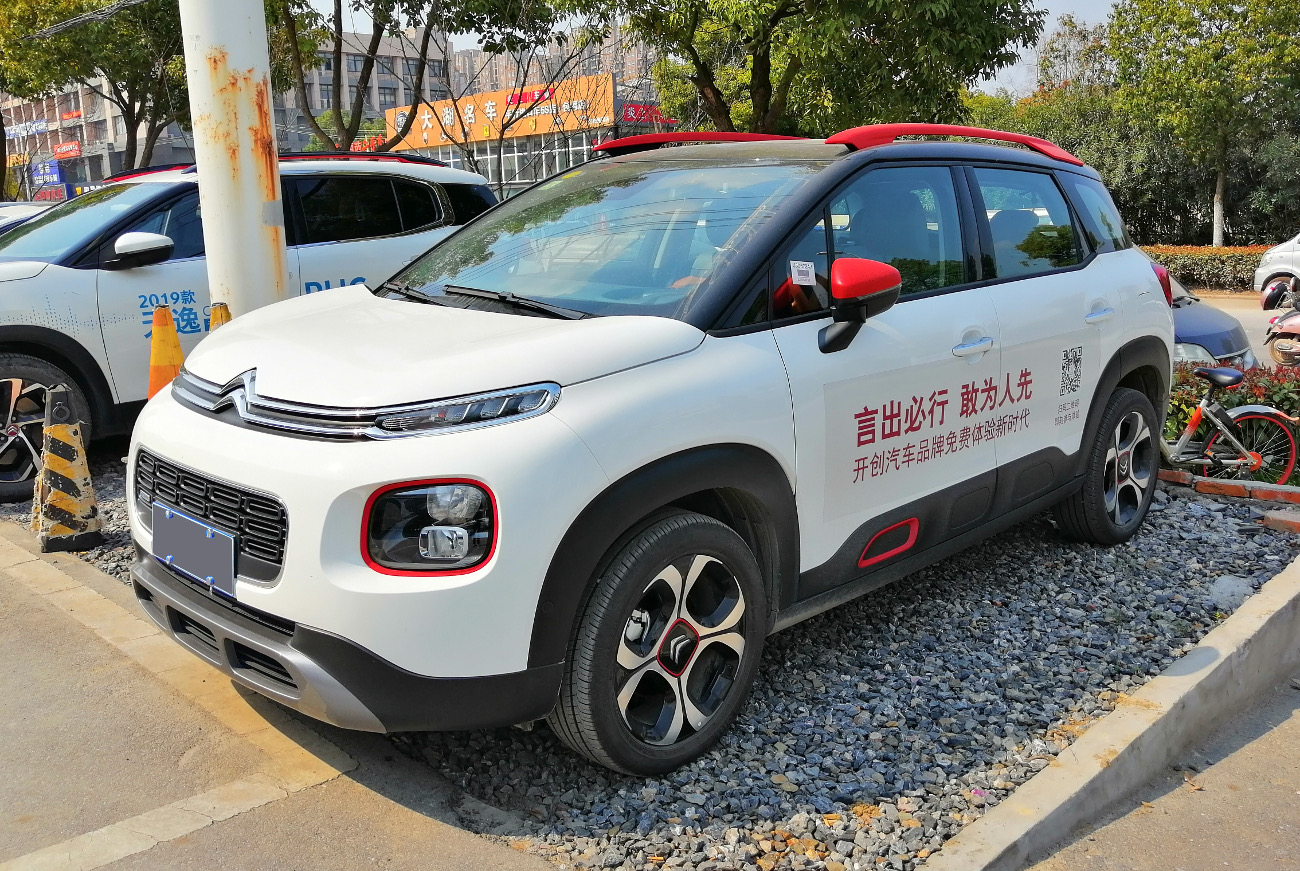
Citroën C4 Aircross

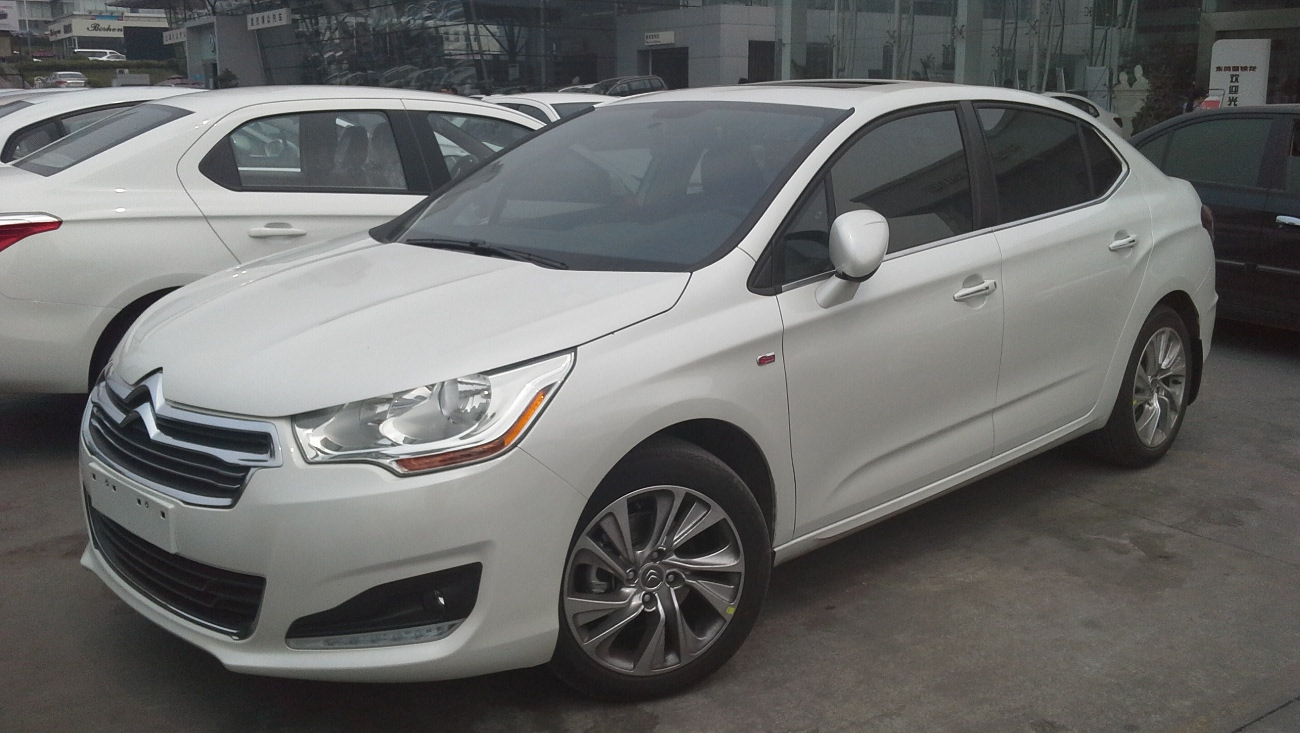
Citroën C4L Sedan

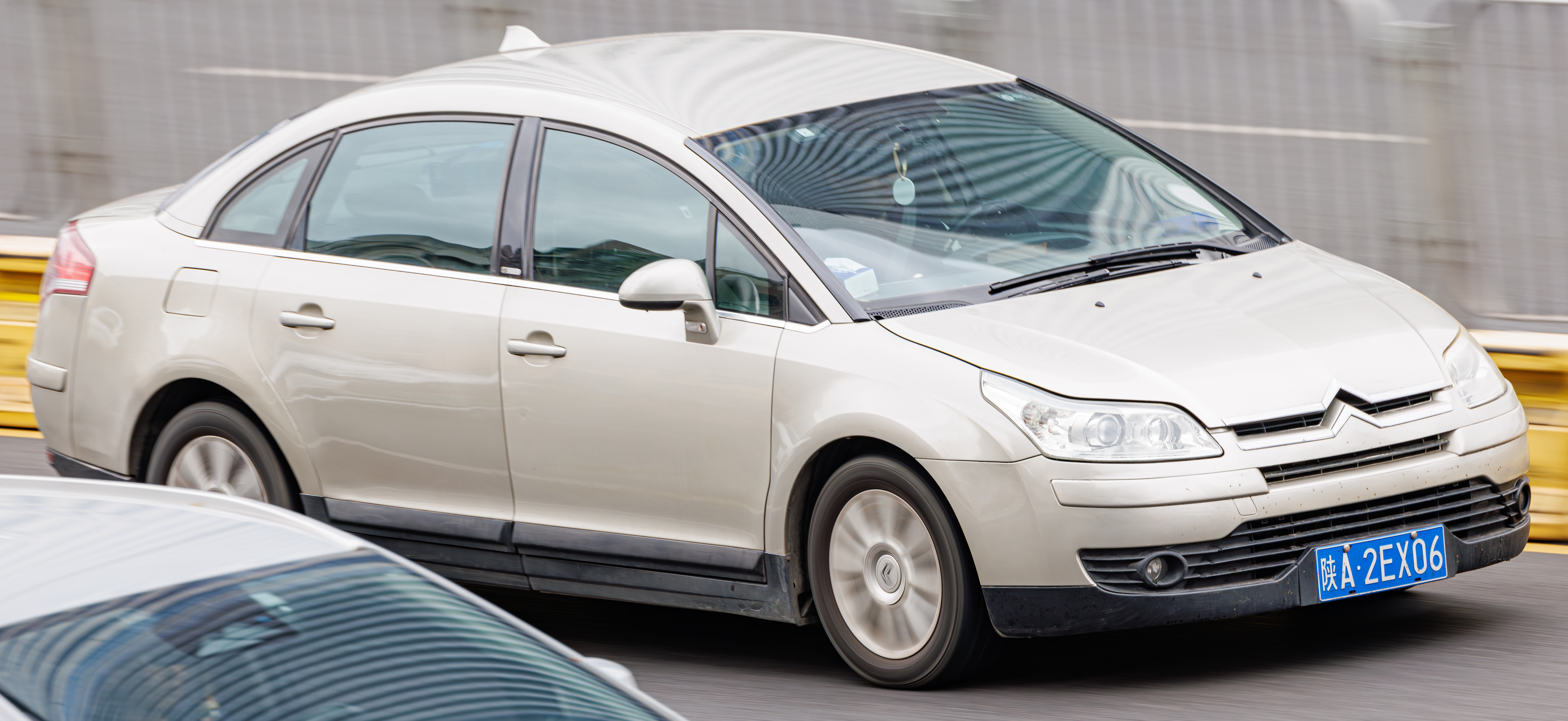
Citroën C-Triomphe

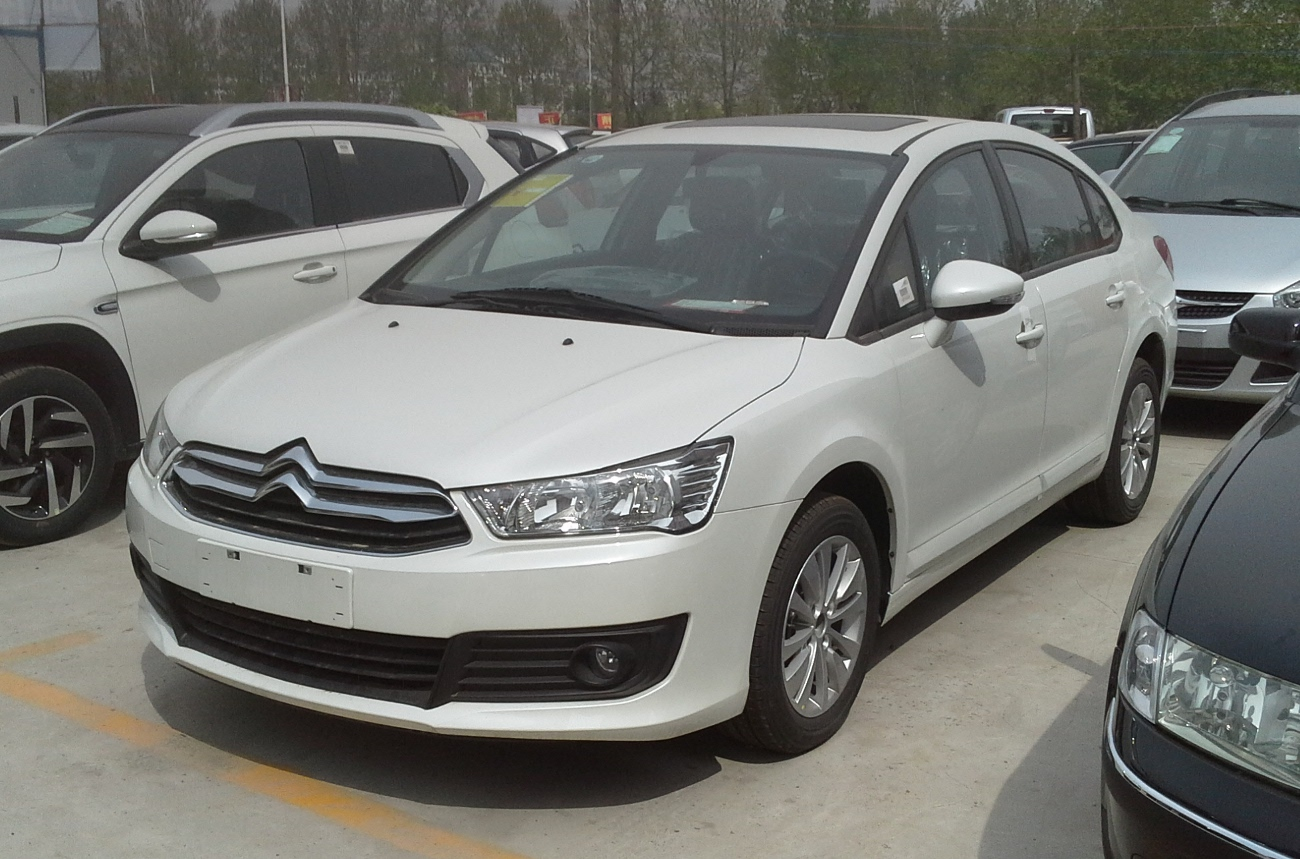
Citroën C-Quatre

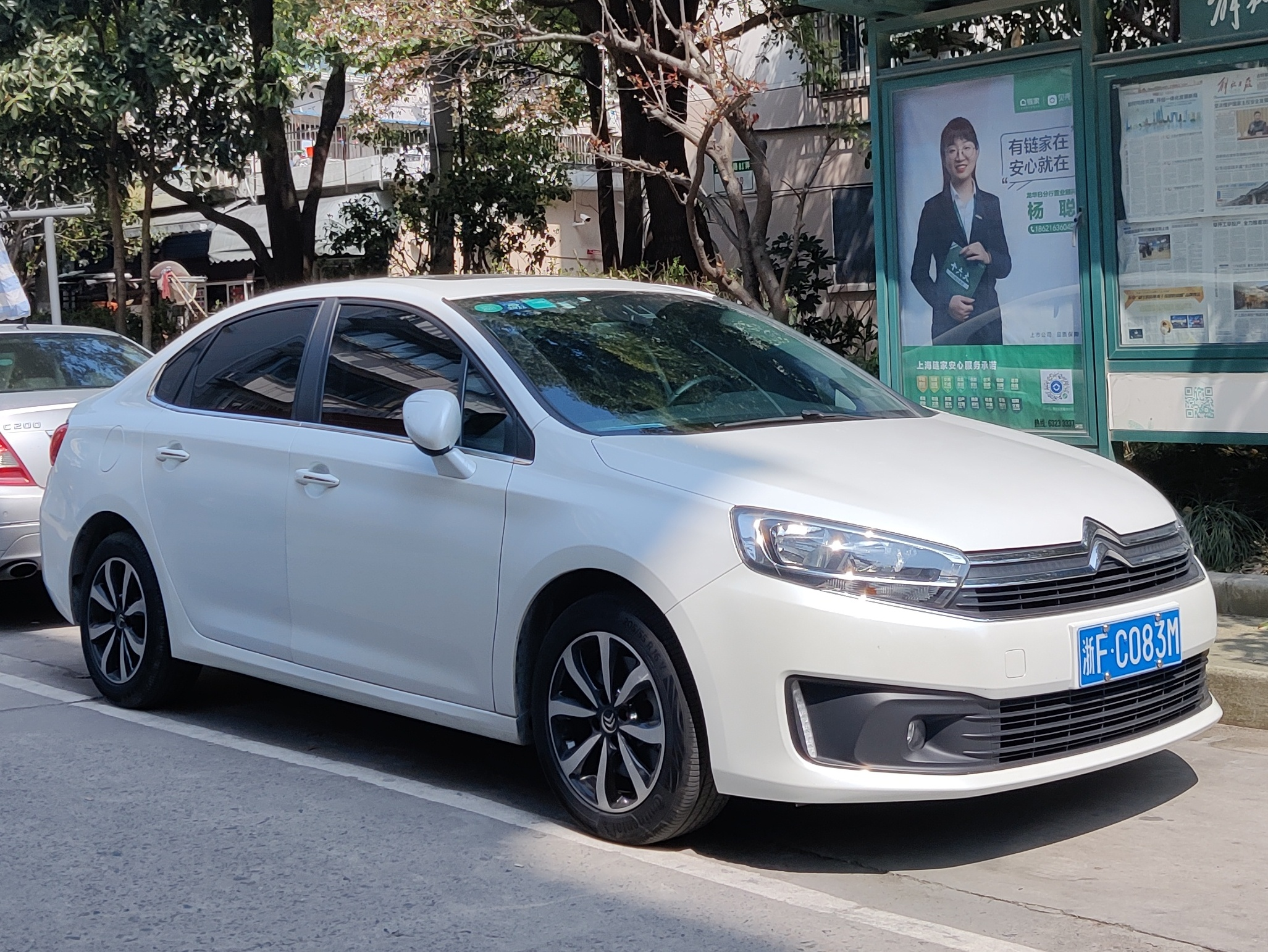
Citroën C4

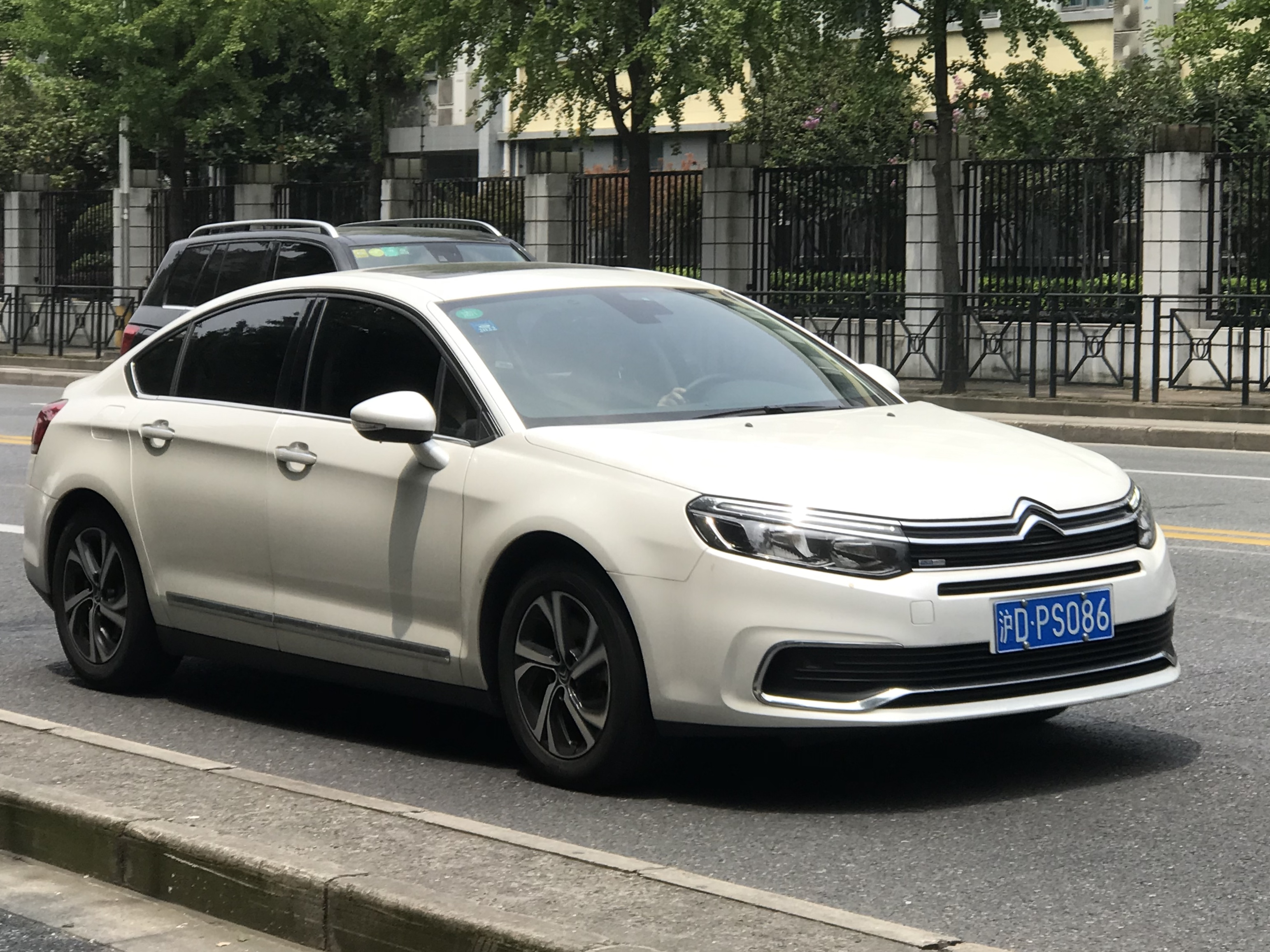
Citroën C5 II

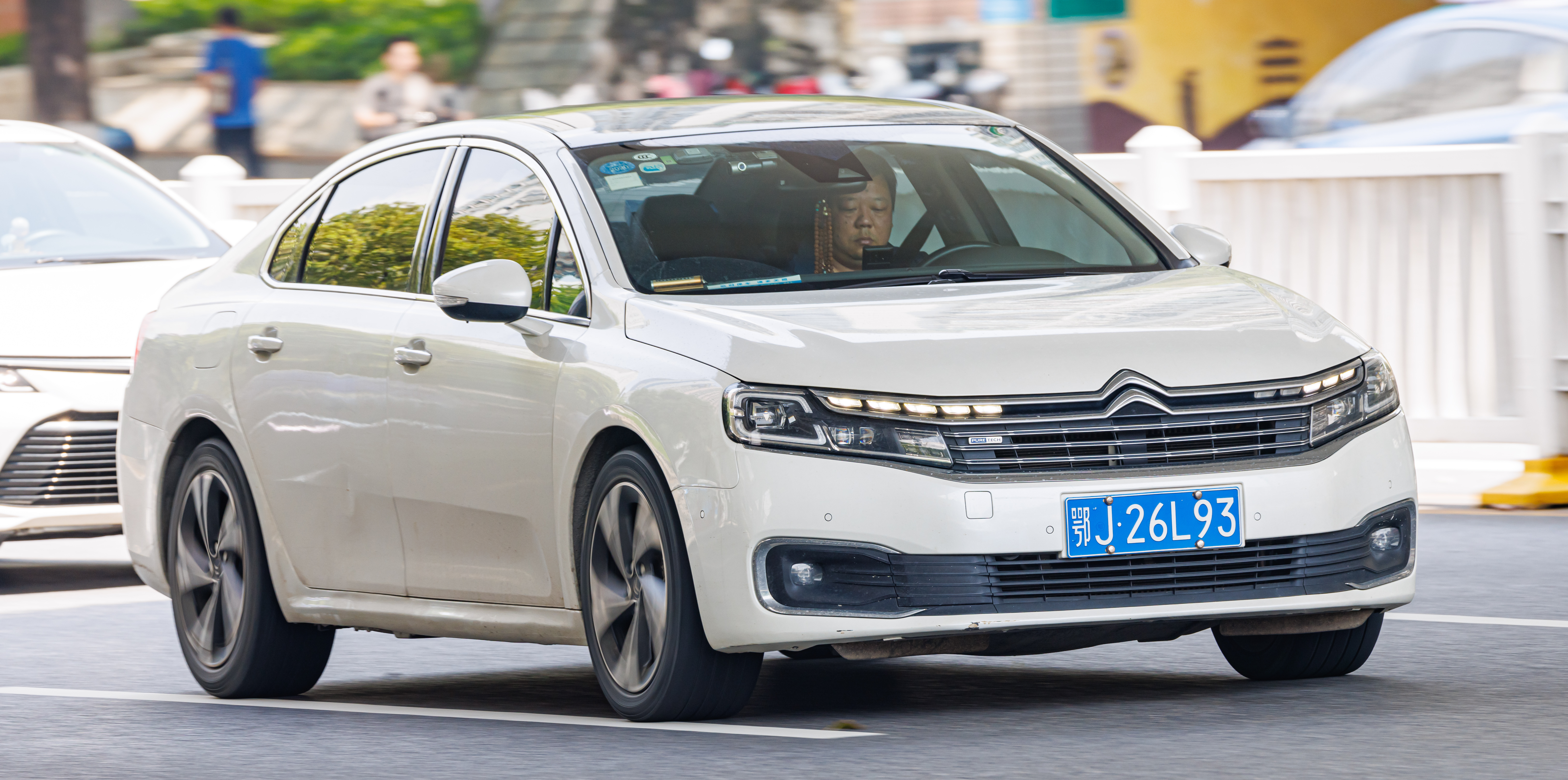
Citroën C6

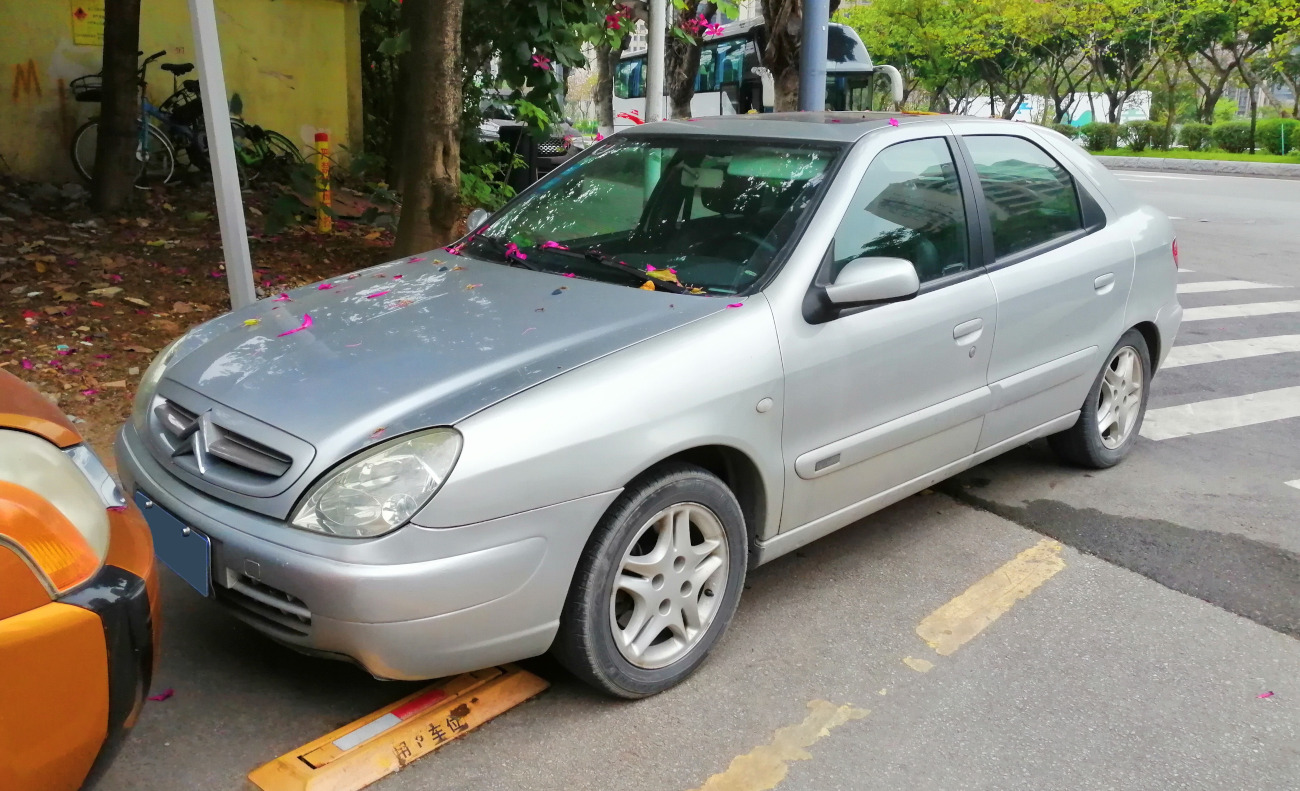
Citroën Xsara

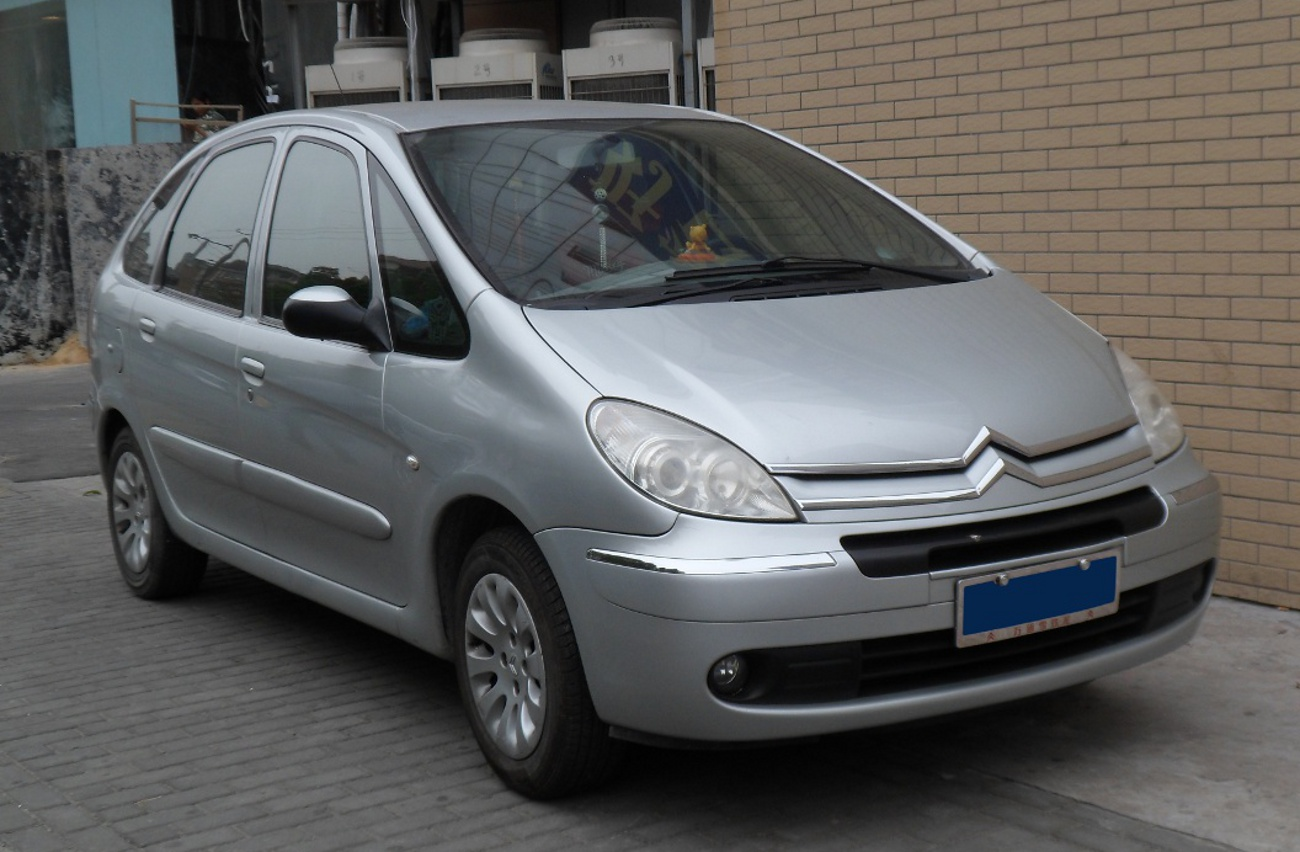
Citroën Xsara Picasso

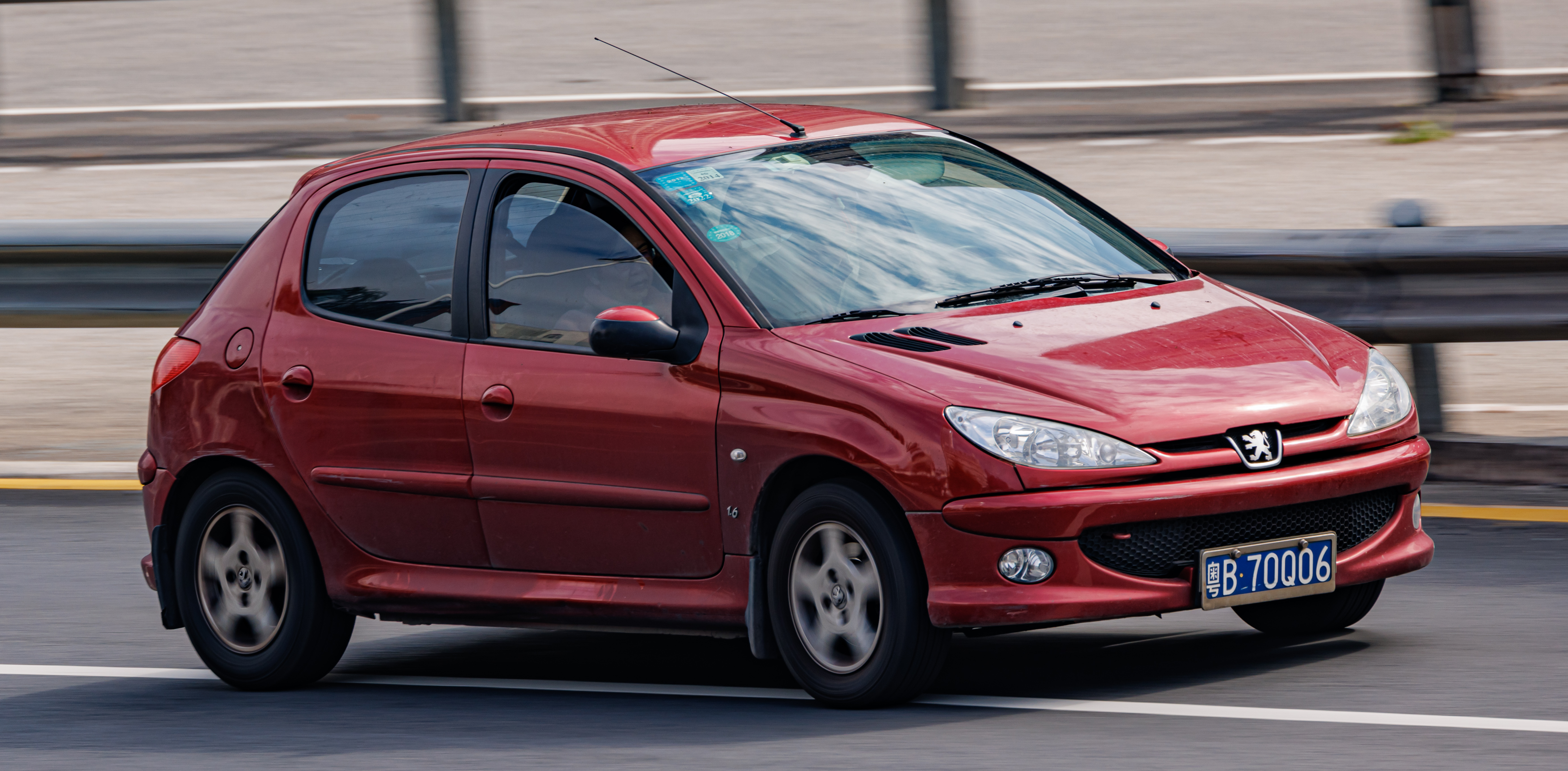
Peugeot 206

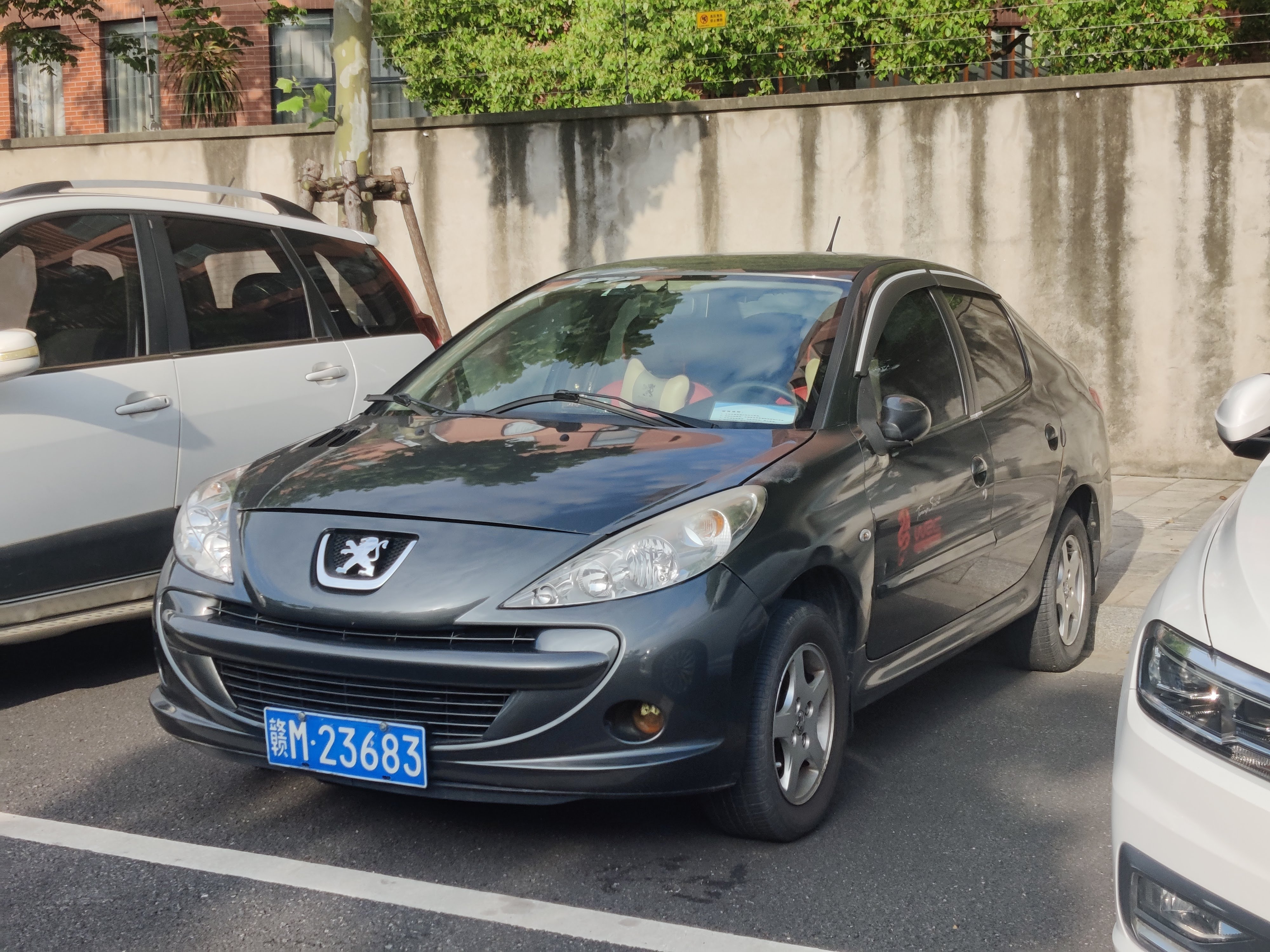
Peugeot 207

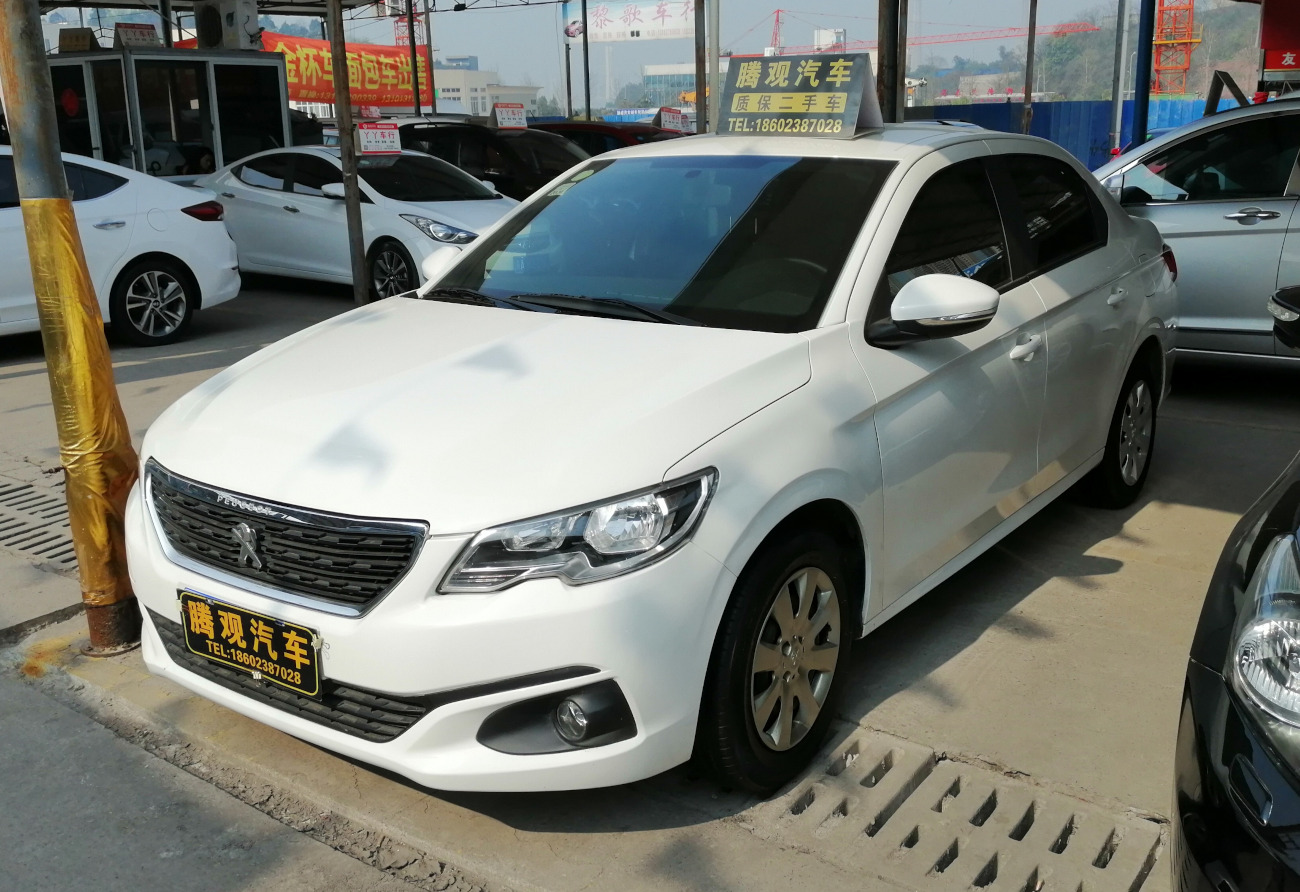
Peugeot 301

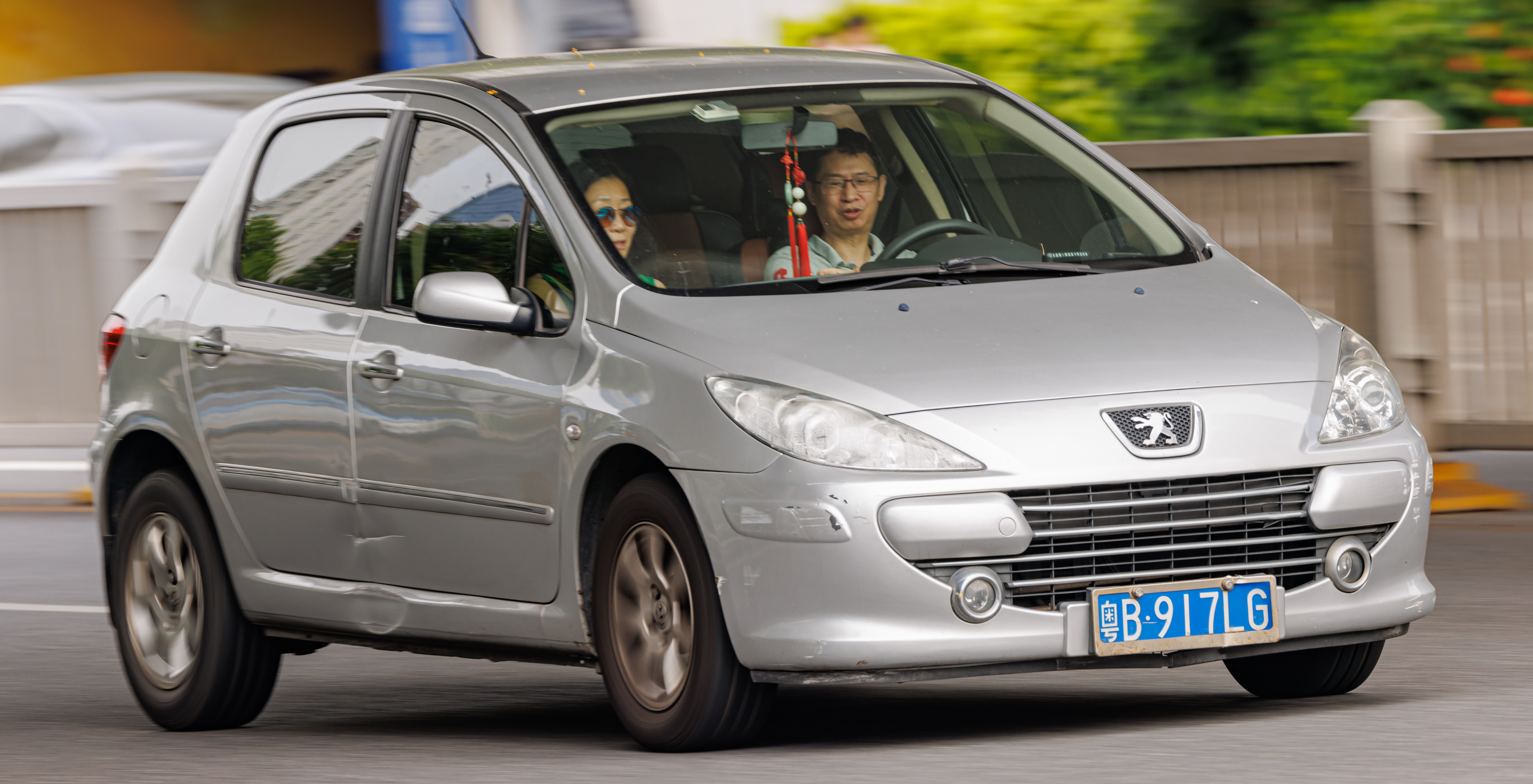
Peugeot 307

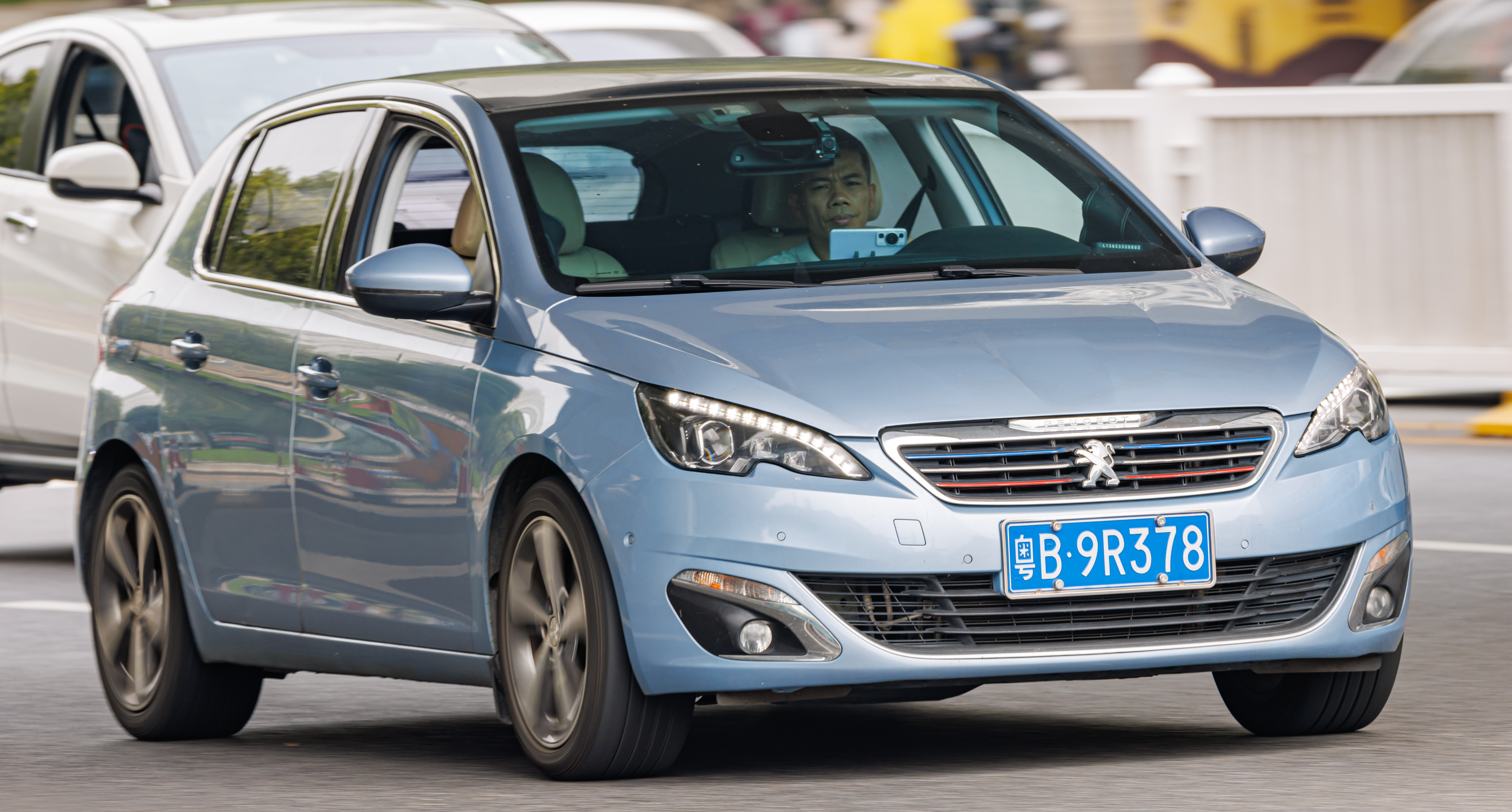
Peugeot 308 Hatchback

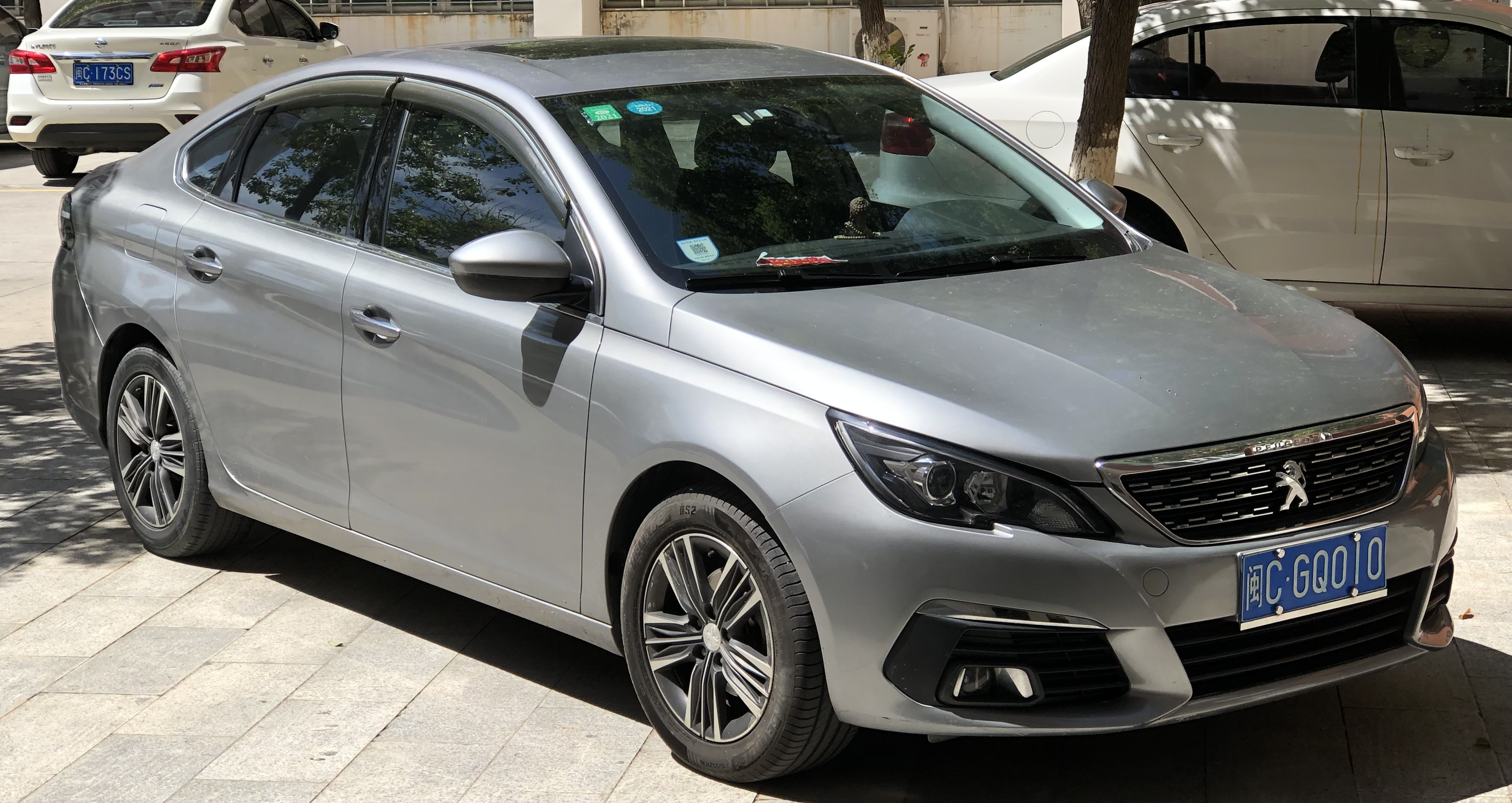
Peugeot 308 Sedan

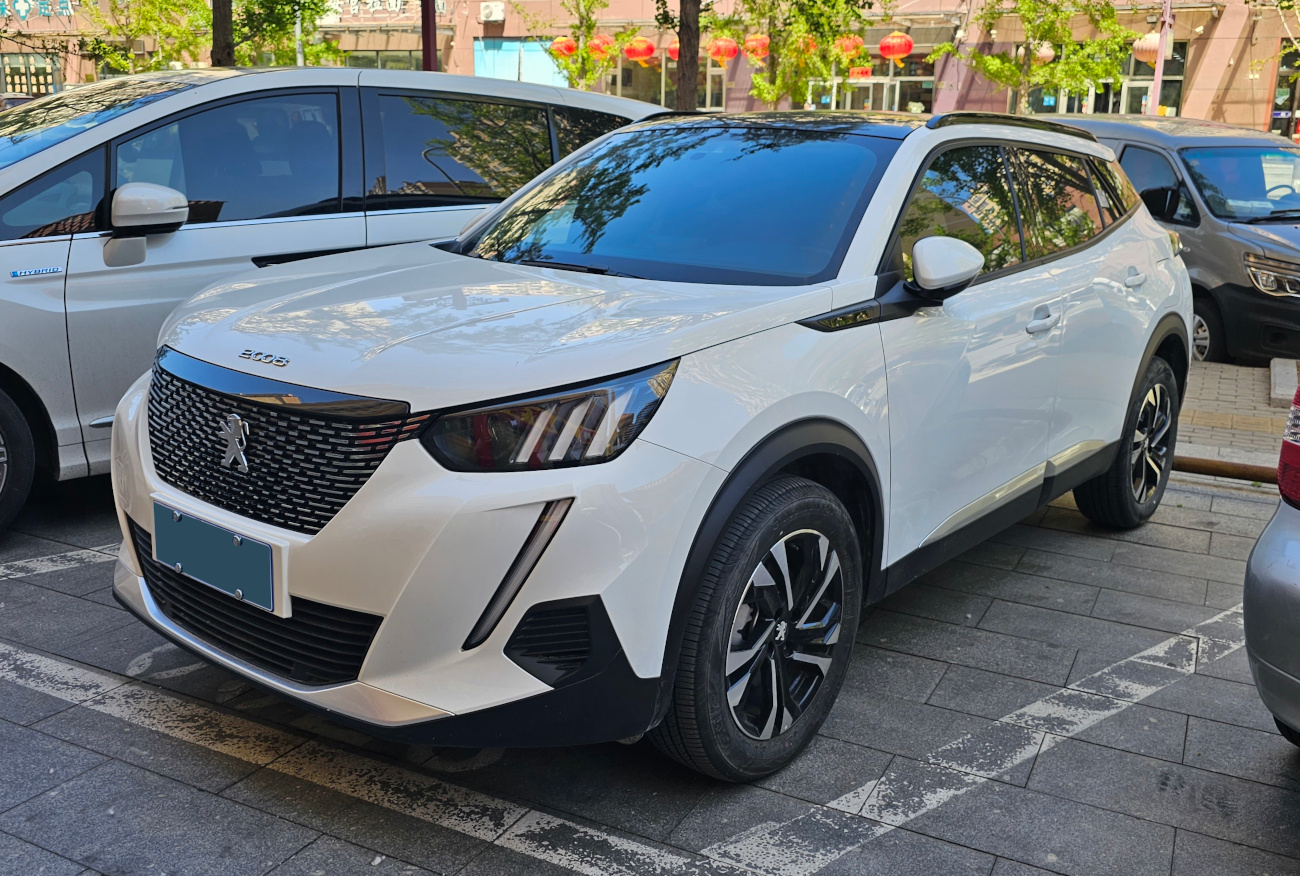
Peugeot 2008

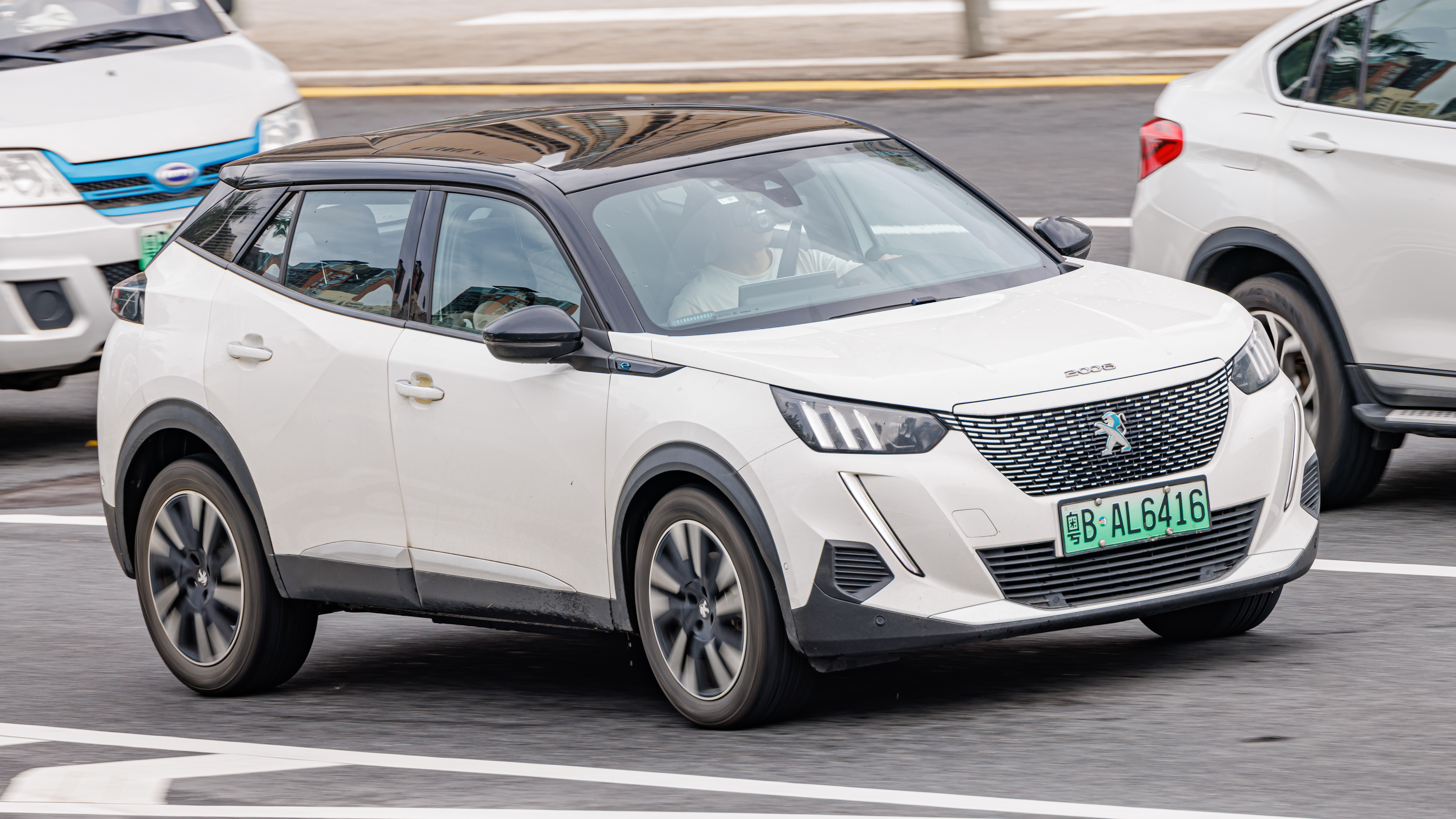
Peugeot e-2008

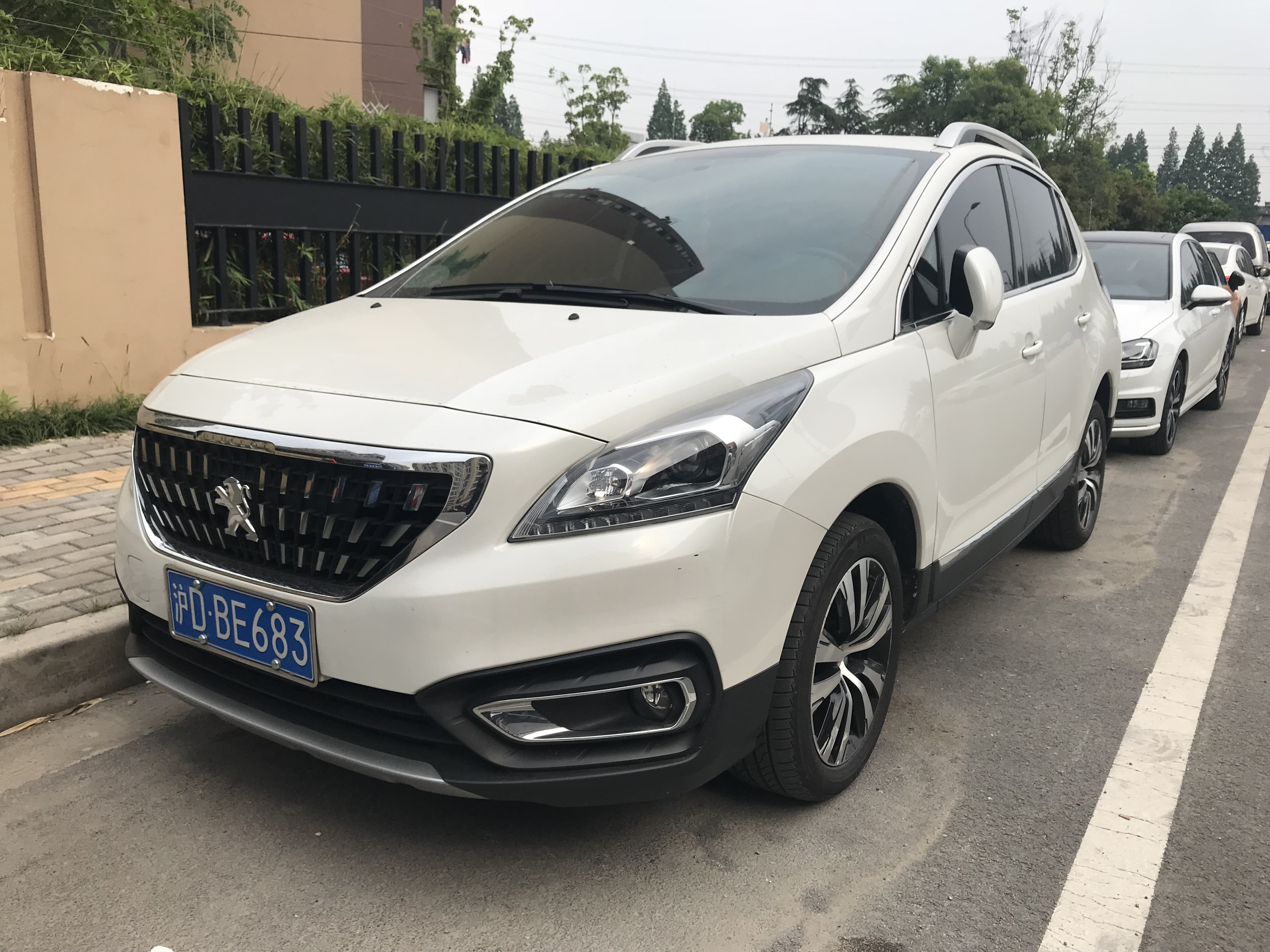
Peugeot 3008
