= List of Citroën concept cars =

There have been a number of concept cars by the French car manufacturer Citroën, produced to show future ideas and forthcoming models at international motor shows.

== Concept cars ==
| Name | Year shown | Image | Notes |
|---|---|---|---|
| Citroën G Van | 1948 | | |
| Citroën Prototype C | 1955–1956 | | |
| Citroën Prototype Y | 1965 | | |
| Citroën GS Camargue | 1972 | | |
| Citroën 2CV Pop | 1973 | | |
| Citroën Buggy GS | 1973 | | |
| Citroën Karin | 1980 | | |
| Citroën C-44 | 1981 | | |
| Citroën Xenia | 1981 | | |
| Citroën Eco 2000 (SA 103) | 1982 | | |
| Citroën Eco 2000 (SA 119) | 1983 | | |
| Citroën Eco 2000 (SA 109) | 1984 | | |
| Citroën Aventure | 1986 | | |
| Citroën Eole | 1986 | | |
| Citroën Xanthia | 1986 | | |
| Citroën Zabrus | 1986 | | |
| Citroën Activa | 1988, 1990 | | |
| Citroën Scarabee d'Or | 1990 | | |
| Citroën Citela | 1992 | | |
| Citroën Xanae | 1994 | | |
| Citroën Tulip | 1995 | | |
| Citroën Berlingo Bulle | 1996 | | |
| Citroën Berlingo Coupe de Plage | 1996 | | |
| Citroën Berlingo Grand Large | 1996 | | |
| Citroën C3 Air | 1998 | | |
| Citroën C3 Lumiere | 1998 | | Entered production as the C3. |
| Citroën C4 Volcane | 1998 | | Entered production as the C4. |
| Citroën Calao | 1999 | | |
| Citroën C6 Lignage | 1999 | | Entered production as the C6. |
| Citroën Pluriel | 1999 | | Entered production as the C3 Pluriel. |
| Citroën Osmose | 2000 | | |
| Citroën C-Crosser | 2001 | | |
| Citroën Osée | 2001 | | |
| Citroën C-Airdream | 2002 | | |
| Citroën Bourlingueur | 2003 | | |
| Citroën C-Airlounge | 2003 | | |
| Citroën C-SportLounge | 2005 | | Entered production as the DS5 |
| Citroën C-Airplay | 2005 | | |
| Citroën C-Buggy | 2006 | | |
| Citroën C-Métisse | 2006 | | |
| Citroën C5 Airscape | 2007 | | Entered production as the C5. |
| Citroën C-Cactus | 2007 | | |
| Citroën Cruise Crosser | 2007 | | |
| GT by Citroën | 2008 | | |
| Citroën Hypnos | 2008 | | |
| Citroën DS Inside | 2009 | | Entered production as the DS3. |
| Citroën Revolte | 2009 | | |
| GQ by Citroën | 2010 | | |
| Citroën Metropolis | 2010 | | Entered production as the DS 9. |
| Citroën Survolt | 2010 | | |
| Citroën Lacoste | 2010 | | |
| Citroën Tubik | 2011 | | |
| Citroën Numero 9 | 2012 | | |
| Citroën Cactus Concept | 2013 | | Entered production as the C4 Cactus. |
| Citroën Technospace | 2013 | | Entered production as the second generation C4 Picasso. |
| Citroën DS Divine | 2014 | | |
| Citroën C-XR Concept | 2014 | | Entered production as the C3-XR. |
| Citroën Aircross Concept | 2015 | | Entered production as the first generation C5 Aircross. |
| Citroën CXperience | 2016 | | Entered production as the C5 X. |
| Citroën C-Aircross Concept | 2017 | | Entered production as the C3 Aircross. |
| Citroën 19 19 Concept | 2019 | | |
| Citroën Oli | 2022 | | |
| Citroën C5 Aircross Concept | 2024 | | Entered production as the second generation C5/ë-C5 Aircross. |
| Citroën ELO | 2025 | | |
| Citroën 2CV | 2026 | | |
