= Citroën C5 Aircross =

Compact crossover SUV model from Citroën

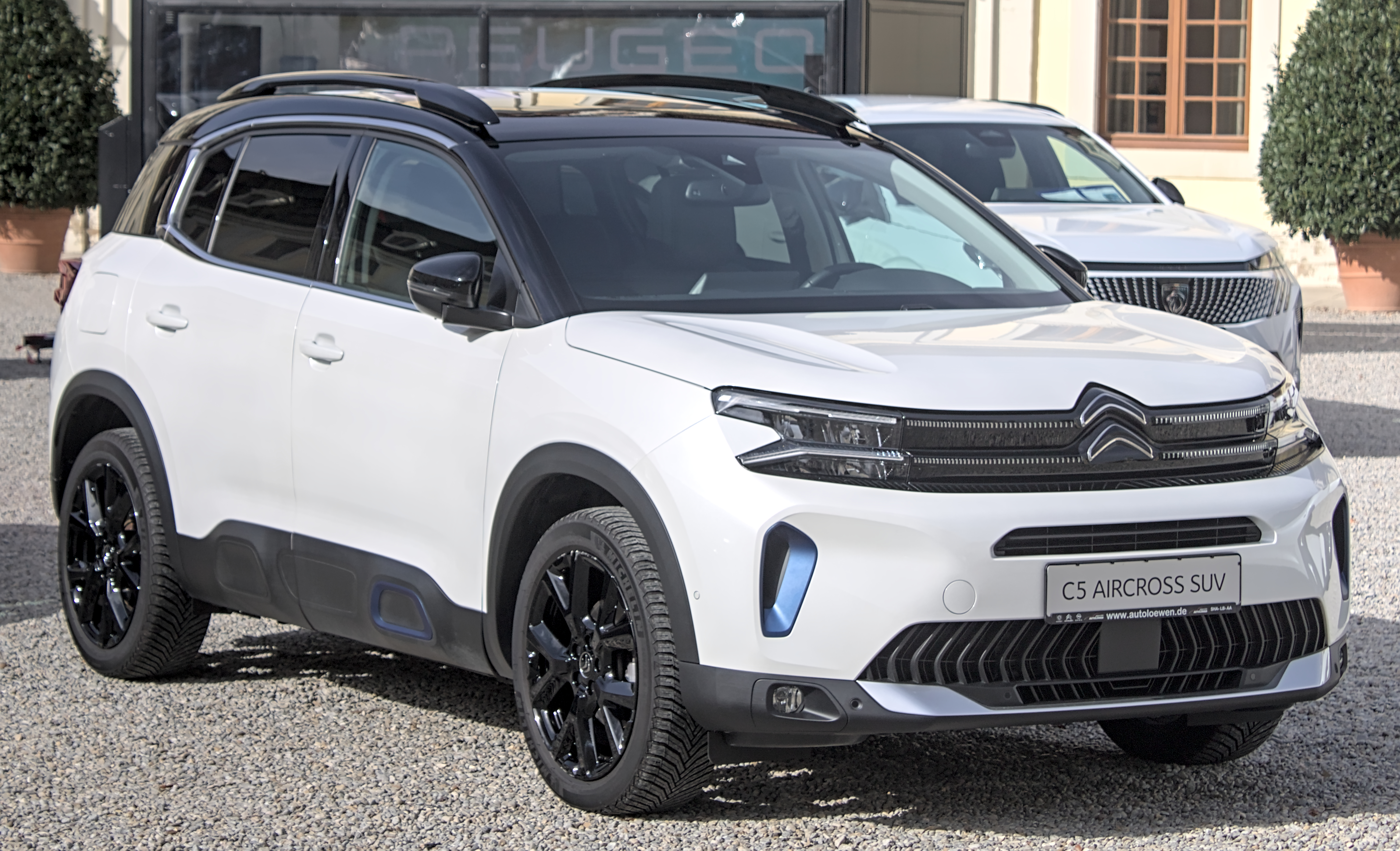

Overview
- Manufacturer: Citroën (Note: PSA Group (2017–2021); Stellantis (2021–present))
- Production: 2017–present

Body and chassis
- Class: Compact crossover SUV (C)
- Body style: 5-door SUV

Chronology
- Predecessor: Citroën C4 Aircross; Citroën C5 Estate; Citroën C4 Spacetourer (for five-seater)

The Citroën C5 Aircross is a compact crossover SUV produced by the French automaker Citroën since 2017. The first generation model was previewed by the Concept Citroën Aircross concept car which was unveiled at the 2015 Shanghai Auto Show. The production version was officially presented for the Chinese market at the 2017 Shanghai Auto Show.

The second generation model was released in April 2025, it is based on the Stellantis' STLA Medium platform, shared with a wider range of other Stellantis vehicles.

== First generation (C84; 2017) ==
First generation
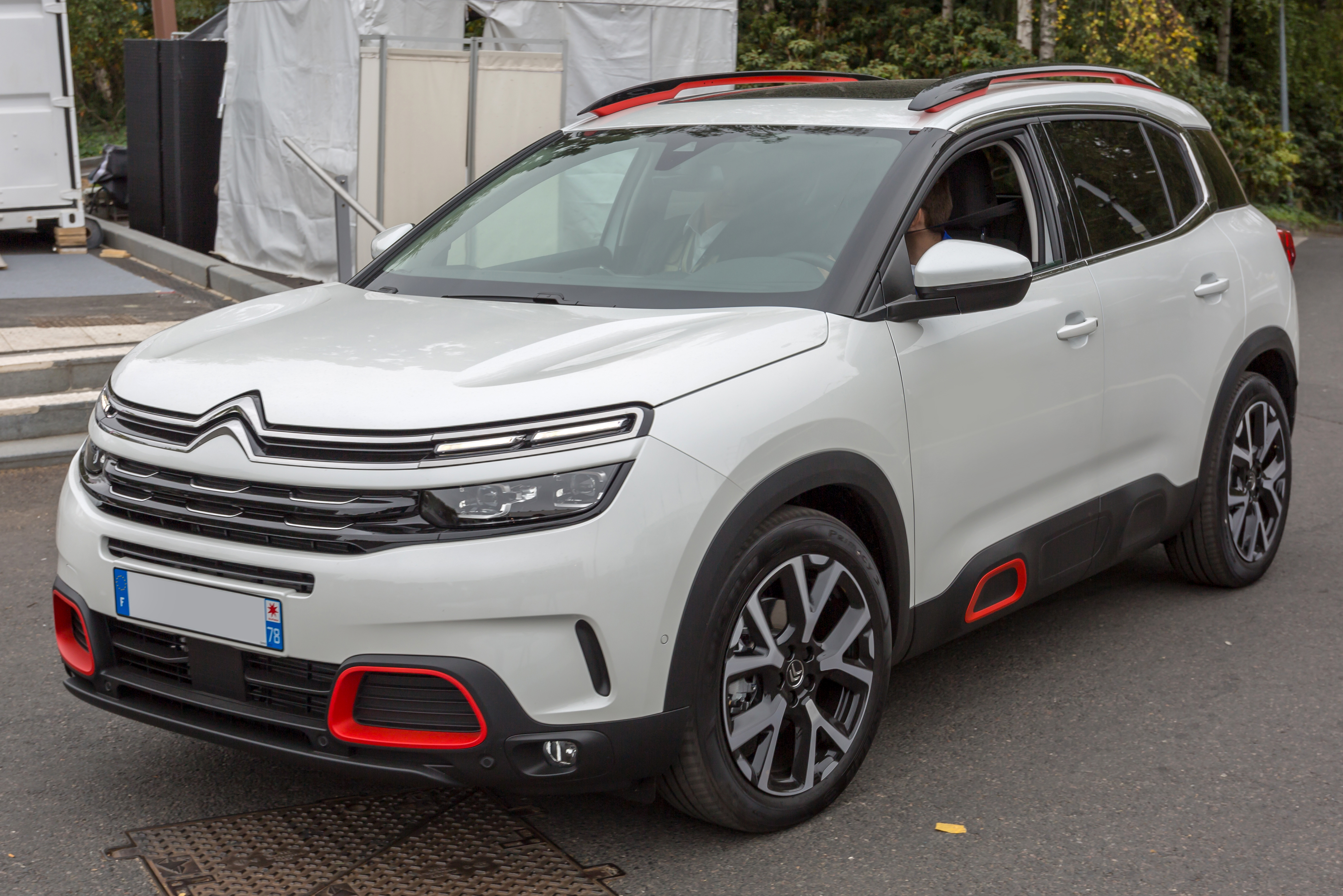

Overview
- Model code: C84
- Production: 2017 – October 2025
- Assembly: France: Rennes (PSA Rennes Plant); China: Chengdu (Dongfeng Peugeot-Citroën); India: Tiruvallur (Citroën India); Russia: Kaluga ("Automotive Technologies")

Body and chassis
- Class: Compact crossover SUV (C)
- Body style: 5-door SUV
- Layout: Front-engine, front-wheel-drive
- Platform: PSA EMP2 platform
- Related: DS 7 Crossback; Opel Grandland; Peugeot 3008 II/4008 II; Peugeot 5008 II

Powertrain
- Engine: Petrol: 1.2 L PSA EB2DTS Turbo I3; 1.6 L PSA EP6FDT Turbo I4; Petrol PHEV: 1.6 L PSA EP6FDT PHEV I4 (HYBRID 225 e-EAT8); Diesel: 1.5 L PSA DV5 BlueHDi I4; 2.0 L PSA DW10 BlueHDi I4
- Transmission: 6-speed manual 6-speed automatic 8-speed automatic

Dimensions
- Wheelbase: 2,730 mm (107.5 in)
- Length: 4,500–4,510 mm (177.2–177.6 in)
- Width: 1,859 mm (73.2 in)
- Height: 1,689–1,705 mm (66.5–67.1 in)
- Curb weight: 1,415–1,770 kg (3,120–3,902 lb)

In Europe, the model was presented at the 2018 Geneva Motor Show, and sales began later that year with the 2019 model. In 2018 production of the C5 Aircross started as well in France at the PSA plant in Rennes. The model takes advantage of the 100-million-euro investment share of Groupe PSA. The C5 Aircross is also assembled in India as CKD since January 2021.

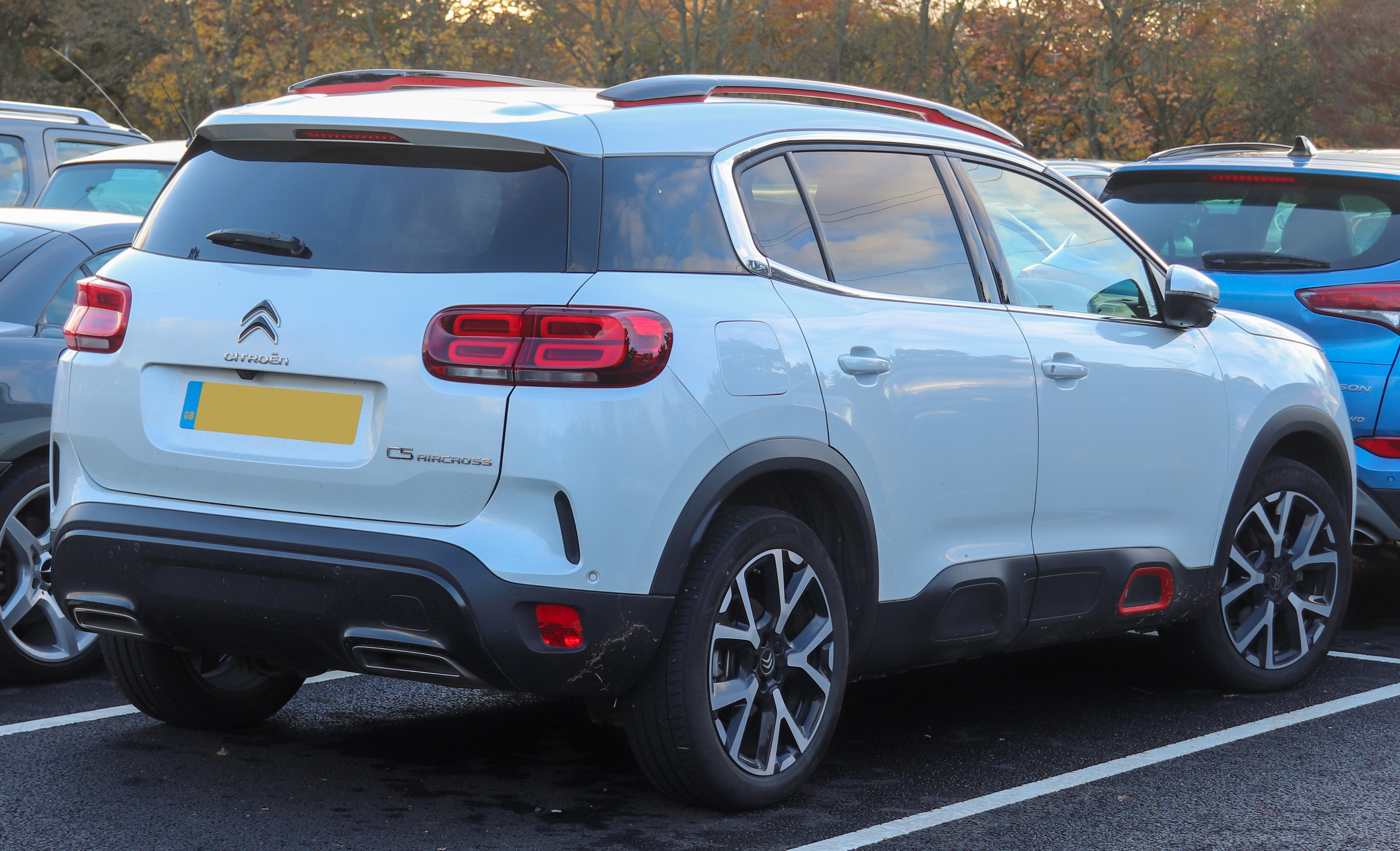
Rear view (pre-facelift)

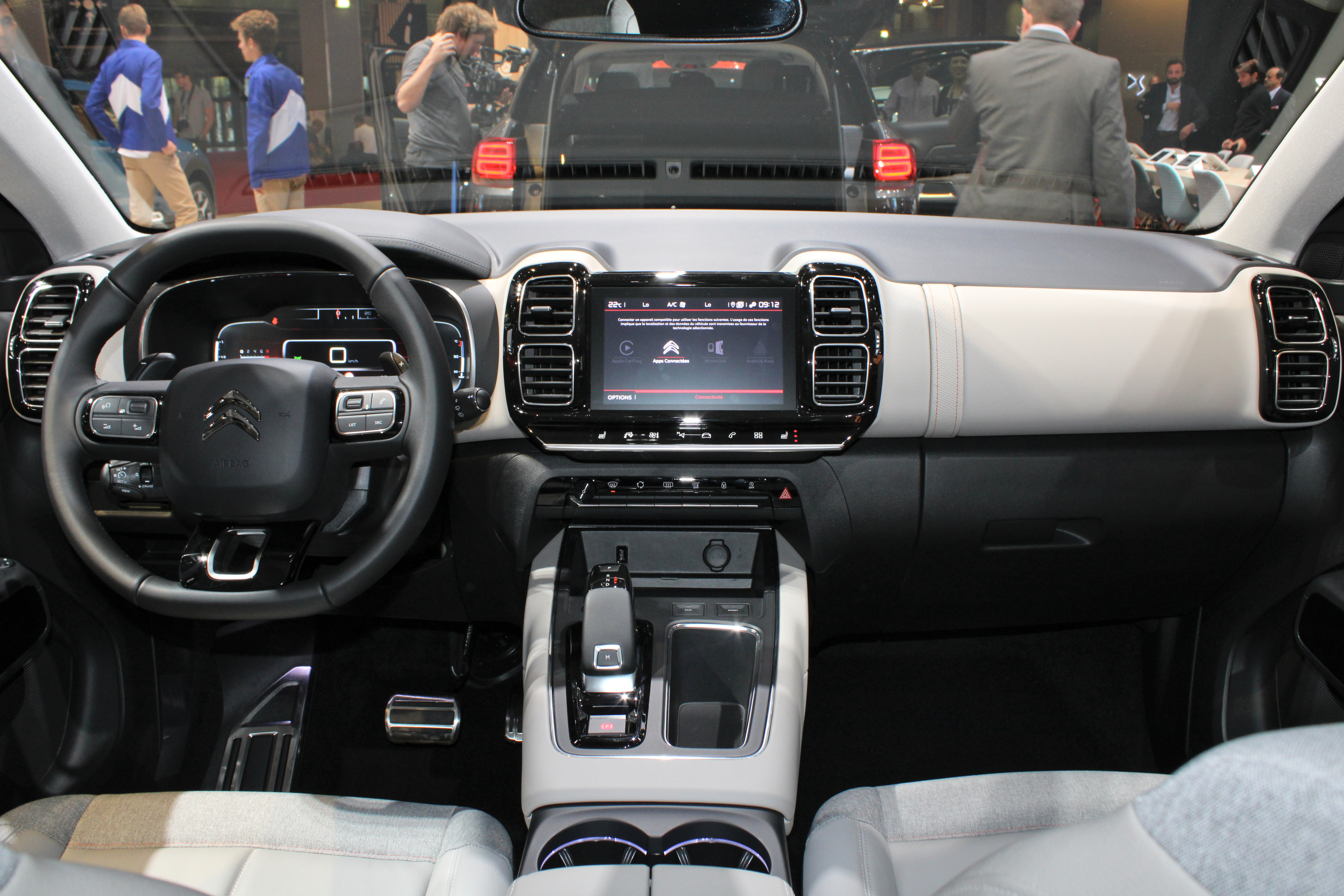
Interior (pre-facelift)

=== Features ===
On the technical side, the C5 Aircross is part of the Citroën "Advanced Comfort" program. Efforts have focused, in particular, on interior space and interior luminosity (notably through a large panoramic sliding roof) and on suspension comfort, via a new progressive hydraulic thrust system.

The C5 Aircross is equipped with optional 12.3-inch TFT digital dashboard screen and an 8-inch capacitive HD touchscreen. In terms of driving aids, the C5 Aircross offers optional automatic emergency braking, blind spot monitoring or adaptive cruise control (with automatic stop). A torque vectoring system marketed as the Grip Control and start assist are also available. Lane-keeping assistance and traffic sign recognition were optional.

The European version has a choice of two petrol engines: the 1.2-litre PureTech 130 PS (128 hp; 96 kW) and the 1.6-litre PureTech 180 PS (178 hp; 132 kW), as well as two diesel versions: the 1.5-litre BlueHDi 130 PS (128 hp; 96 kW) and the 2.0-litre BlueHDi 180 PS (178 hp; 132 kW). Depending on the version, these different engines can be coupled to a six-speed manual gearbox, or an eight-speed EAT8 automatic transmission.

The C5 Aircross is also the first Citroën vehicle equipped with a plug-in hybrid powertrain. Introduced in November 2019, the plug-in hybrid system combines a PureTech 180 petrol engine that develops 180 PS (178 hp; 132 kW) with an 80 kW (109 PS; 107 hp) electric motor, with a fully-electric range of around 50 km (31 mi) under WLTP testing standards.

Sales in China started in late 2017. The engine options in China are the standard modern turbocharged 1.6-litre (350THP) and 1.8-litre (380THP) engines that are used as well in the Chinese Citroën C5 and C6 and the Peugeot 4008 and 5008 and the Peugeot 508 and some DS models. All these models use the 6 speed third-generation Tiptronic automatic transmission. The European and Chinese cars are largely identical, apart from the engine and gearbox options. In the interior, the European version has three individual adjustable and foldable seats, while the Chinese model has a fixed folding 60:40 bench at the back.

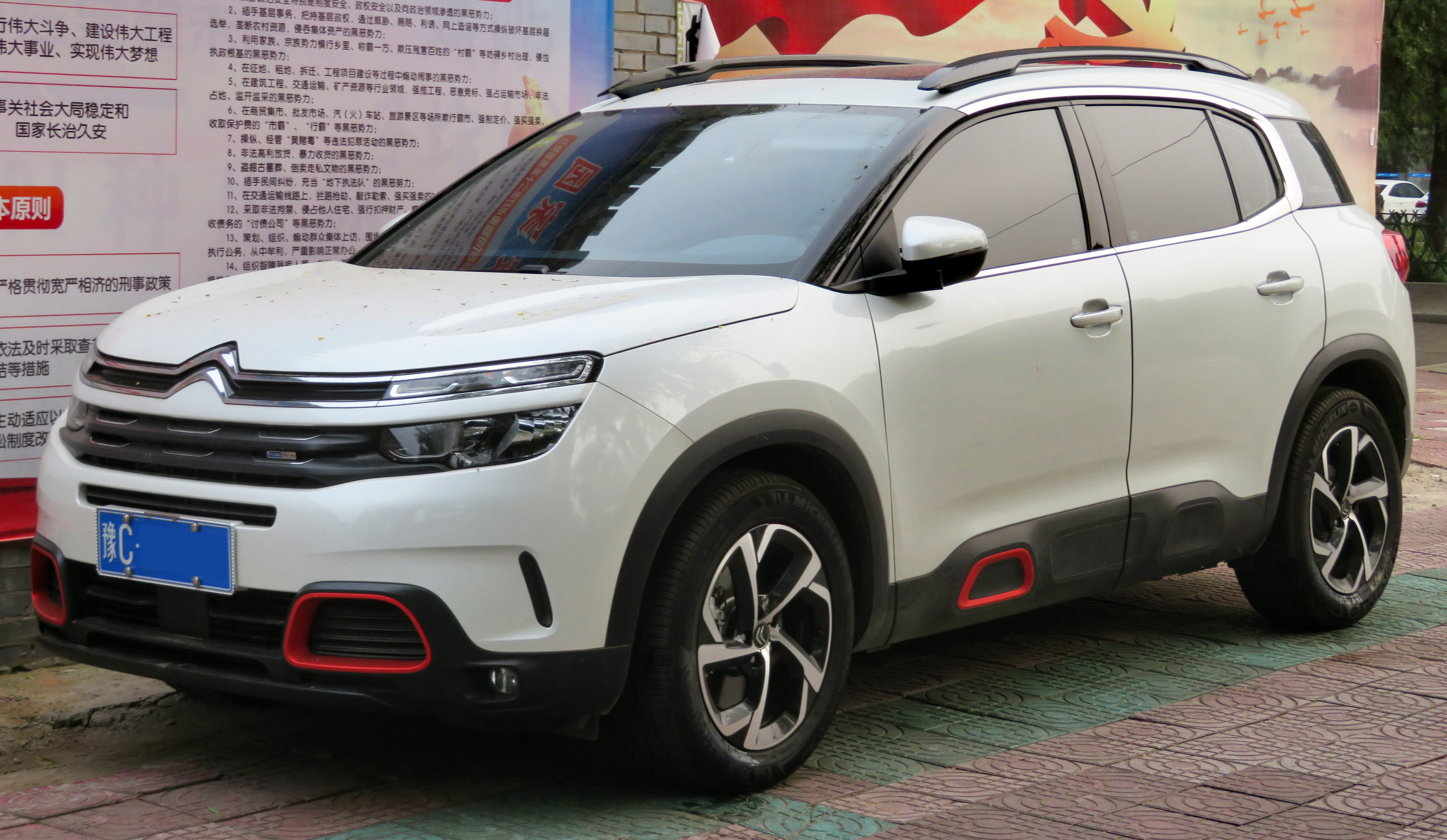
Front view (pre-facelift)

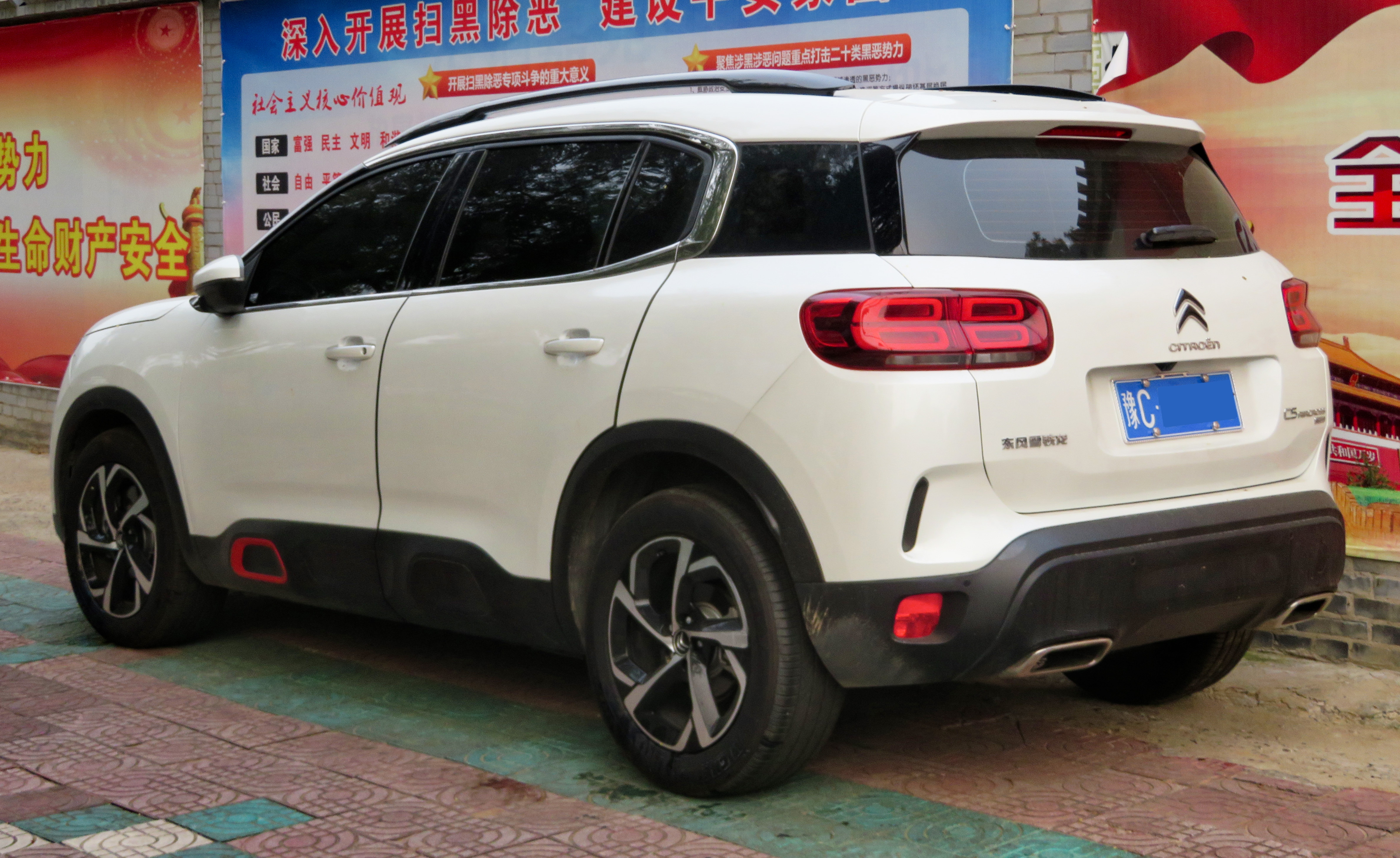
Rear view (pre-facelift)

=== Facelift ===
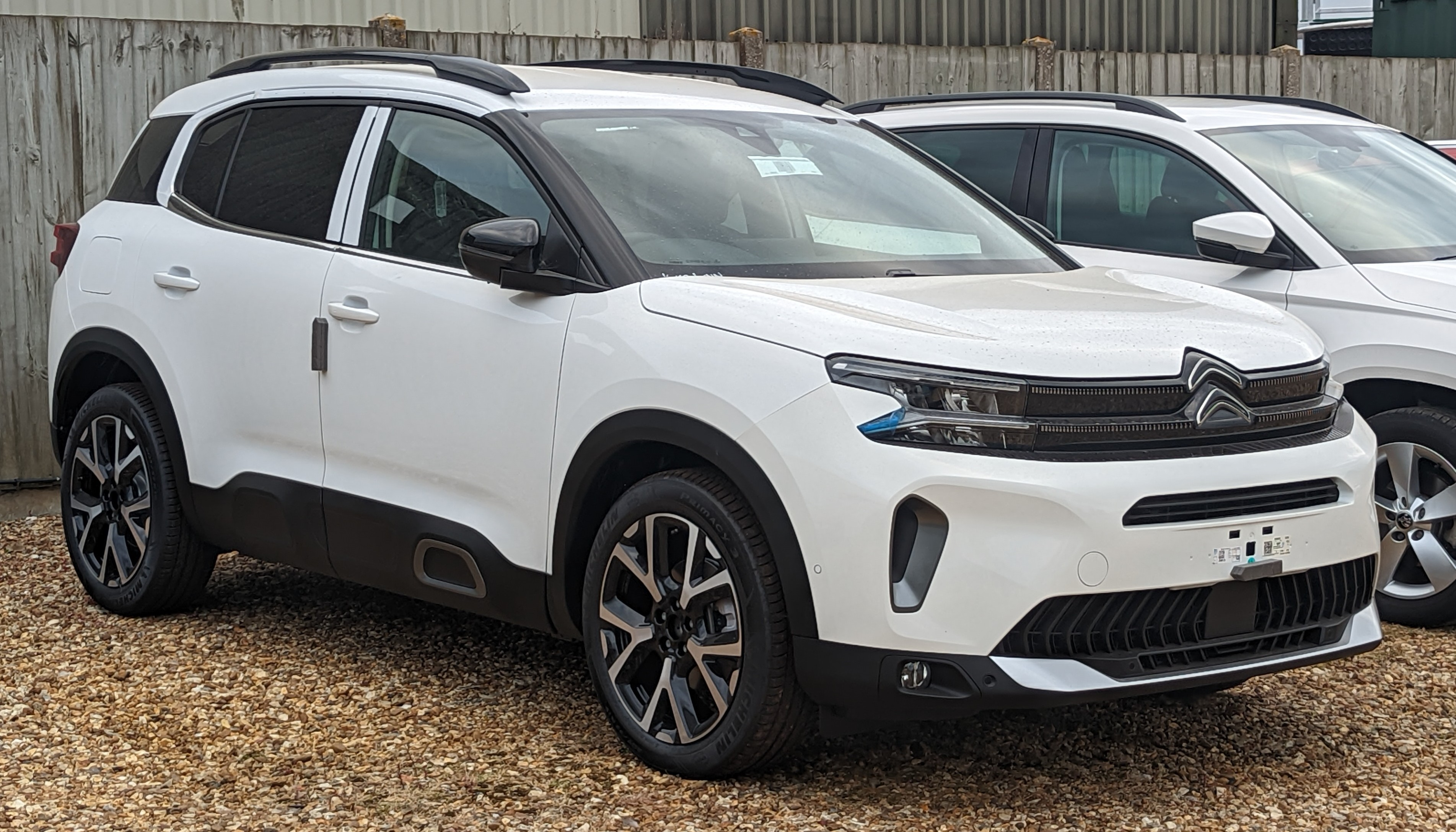
Citroën C5 Aircross (facelift)

The European C5 Aircross received a facelift in January 2022, with a major redesign of the front end, minor redesign of the rear end and new interior features.

The Chinese version was facelifted in July 2022. With the similar exterior changes to the European model, it was renamed from Dongfeng Citroën Tianyi C5 Aircross to Dongfeng Citroën Tianyi Beyond (or more rarely Dongfeng Citroën Tianyi Beyond C5 Aircross, as the name "C5 Aircross" is still present on the tailgate).

In India, the facelift model was launched in September 2022.

From 2023, CKD C5 Aircross are sent by Stellantis Chinese partner Dongfeng Motor Corporation to the former Stellantis Kaluga plant, in Russia. Stellantis being out of this country since the sanctions against Russia following the Russian invasion of Ukraine in 2022, these operations are done without its endorsement. Stellantis states having lost control of its Russian entities. The company based in Russia that assembles these CKD kits using the Kaluga plant is named "Automotive Technologies".

==== Plug-in hybrid ====
In November 2022, the C5 Aircross received a 180 hp (130 kW) plug-in hybrid version. Its petrol engine develops 150 hp (110 kW), less than the 225 hp (168 kW) hybrid version that also has electric range.

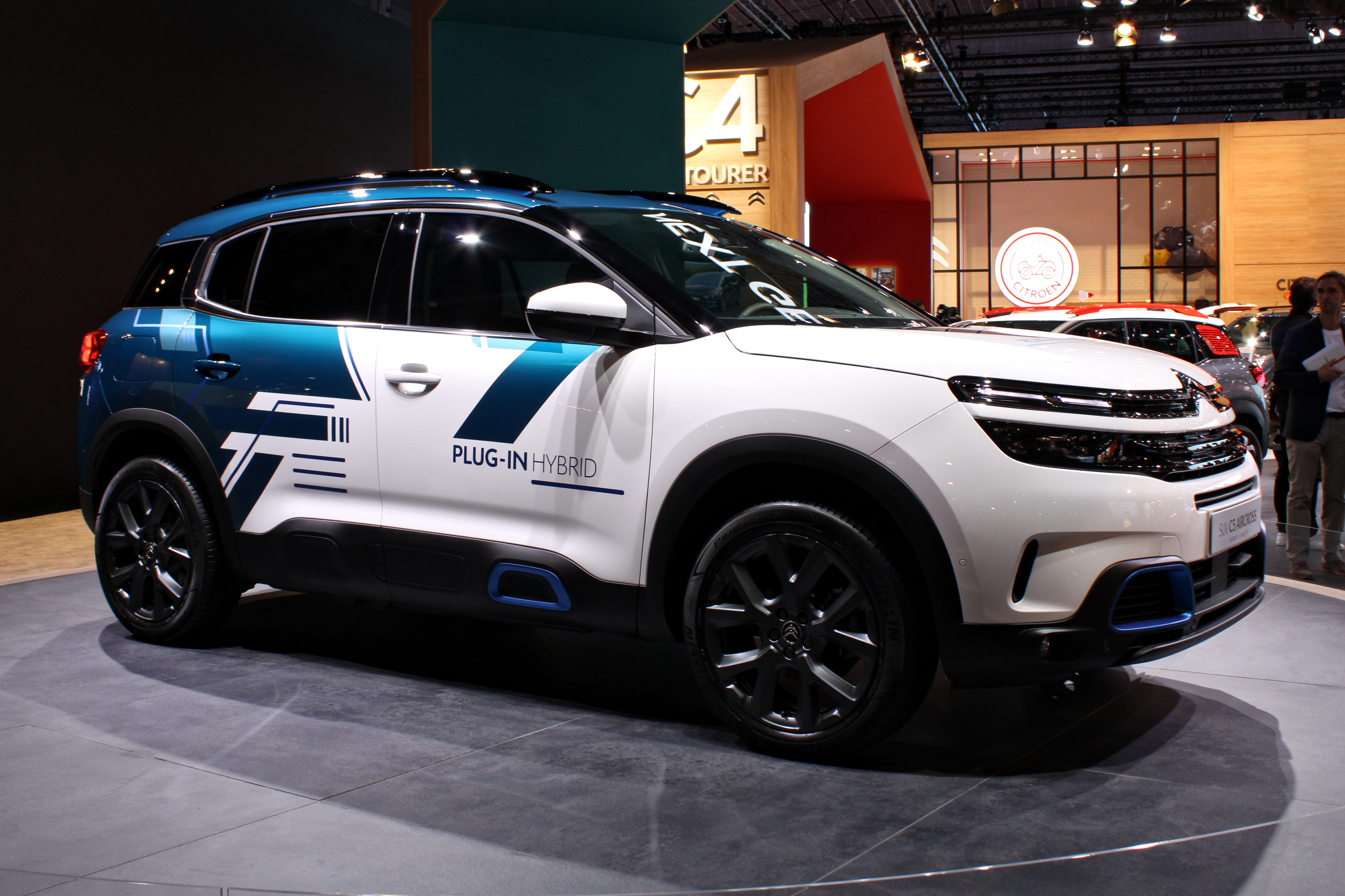
C5 Aircross Hybrid Concept (front view)

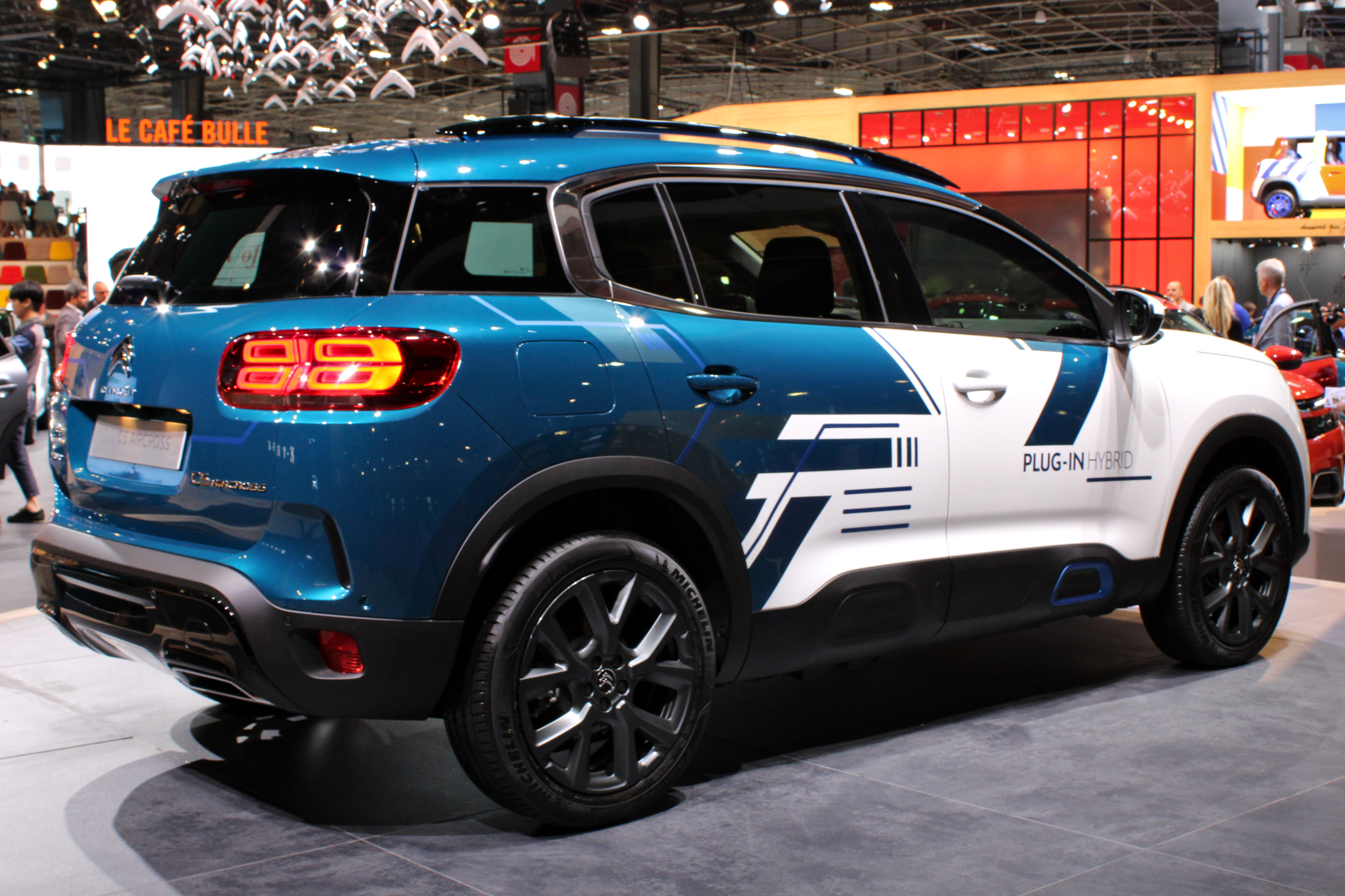
C5 Aircross Hybrid Concept (rear view)

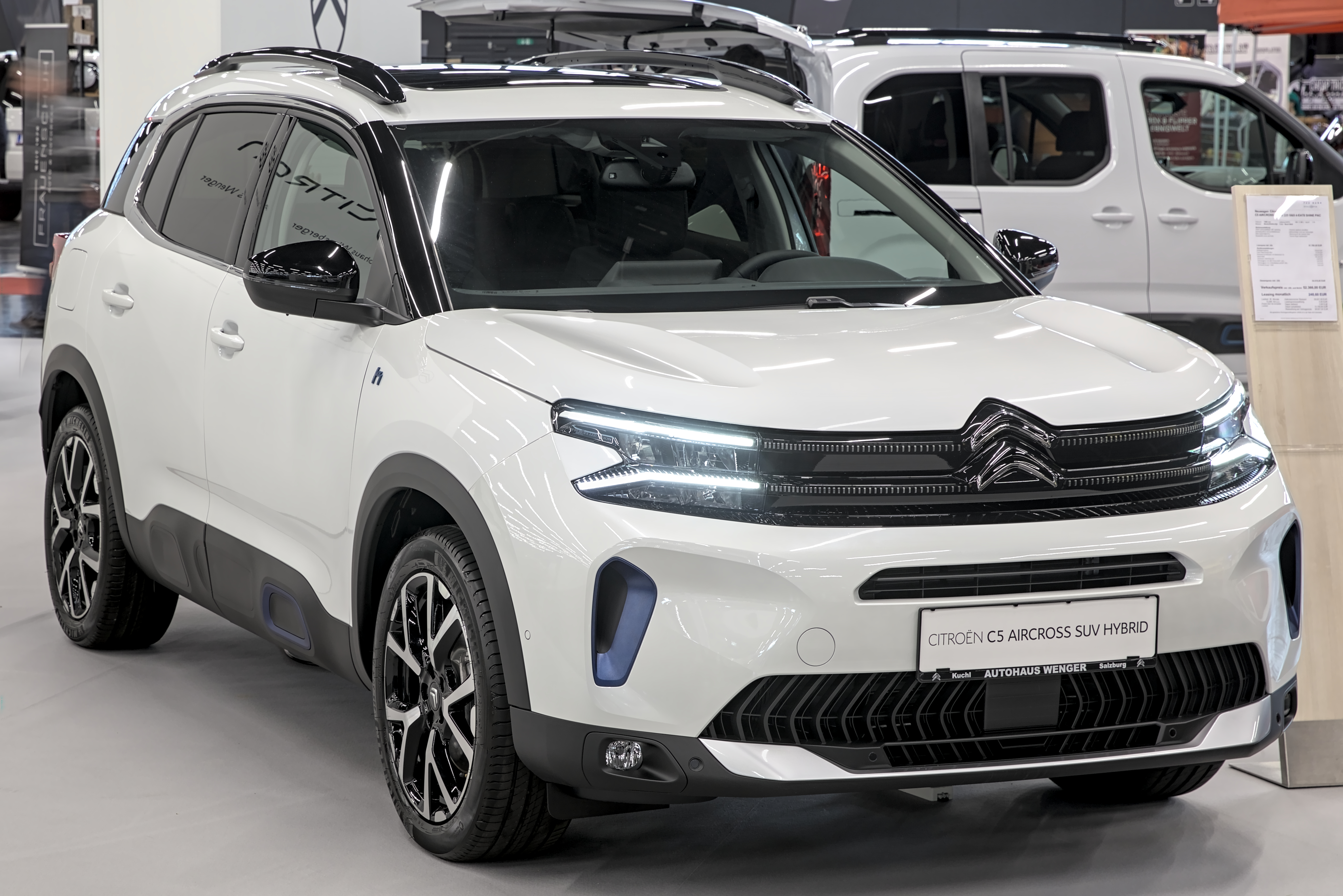
Front view (facelift)

=== Technical data ===
==== Europe ====
Models	1.2 PureTech 130	1.6 PureTech 180	1.5 BlueHDi 130	2.0 BlueHDi 180
Production period	Since 2018			
Characteristics
Engine model	3 cylinder inline-Petrol engine	4 cylinder inline-Petrol engine	4 cylinder inline-Diesel engine	4 cylinder inline-Diesel engine
Forced induction	Turbocharger	Turbocharger	Turbocharger	Turbocharger
Engine displacement	1199 cm^{3}	1598 cm^{3}	1499 cm^{3}	1997 cm^{3}
max. Power at rpm	96 kW (129 hp; 131 PS) / 5500	133 kW (178 hp; 181 PS) / 5500	96 kW (129 hp; 131 PS) / 3750	133 kW (178 hp; 181 PS) / 3750
max. Torque at rpm	230 N⋅m (170 lb⋅ft) / 1750	250 N⋅m (184 lb⋅ft) / 1650	300 N⋅m (221 lb⋅ft) / 1750	400 N⋅m (295 lb⋅ft) / 2000
Transmission
Drive	Front-wheel-drive			
Transmission	6-Speed-Manual transmission	8-Speed-Automatic transmission	6-Speed-Manual transmission or 8-Speed-Automatic transmission or 6-Speed-Automatic transmission	8-Speed-Automatic transmission
Performance
Top speed	195 km/h	219 km/h	189 km/h	211 km/h
Acceleration, 0–100 km/h	10,5 s	8,2 s	10,4 s & 10,6 s	8,6 s
Fuel consumption per 100 km (combined)	5.2 L	5.7 L	4.1 L and 4.0 L	4.7 L
CO2 emission g/Km	119	129	106	124
Kerb weight	0 kg (0 lb)	0 kg (0 lb)	0 kg (0 lb)	0 kg (0 lb)
Tank capacity	53 l			

==== China ====
Chinese models	350 THP	380 THP
Production period	Since 09/2017	
Characteristics
Engine model	4 cylinder inline-Petrol engine	
Forced induction	Turbocharger	
Engine displacement	1598 cm^{3}	1751 cm^{3}
Compression ratio	9.2 : 1	9.7 : 1
max. Power at rpm	123 kW (165 hp; 167 PS) / 6000	150 kW (201 hp; 204 PS) / 5500
max. Torque at rpm	245 N⋅m (181 lb⋅ft) / 1400–4000	280 N⋅m (207 lb⋅ft) / 1400–4000
Transmission
Drive	Front-wheel-drive	
Transmission	6-Speed-Automatic transmission	
Performance
Top speed		215 km/h
Acceleration, 0–100 km/h		9.1 s
Fuel consumption per 100 km (combined)	6.8 L 92 octane	6.9 L 92 octane
Kerb weight	1,490 kg (3,285 lb)	1,530 kg (3,373 lb)
Tank capacity	53 l	

=== Concept model ===
The Citroën C5 Aircross was previewed by the Concept Citroën Aircross shown at the 2015 Shanghai Motor Show, measuring 4,580 mm (180 in) in length and fitted with 22-inch wheels.

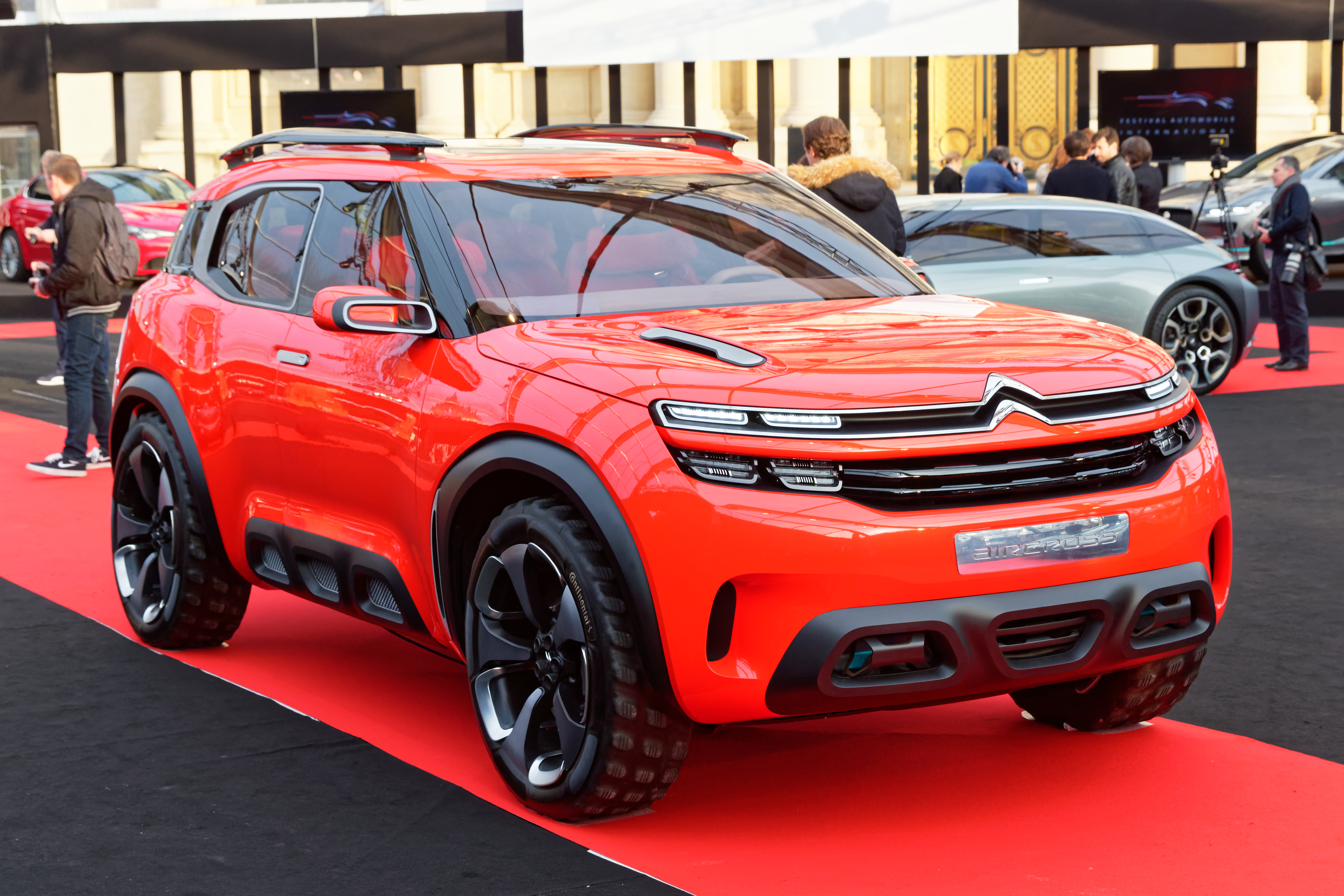
Front view

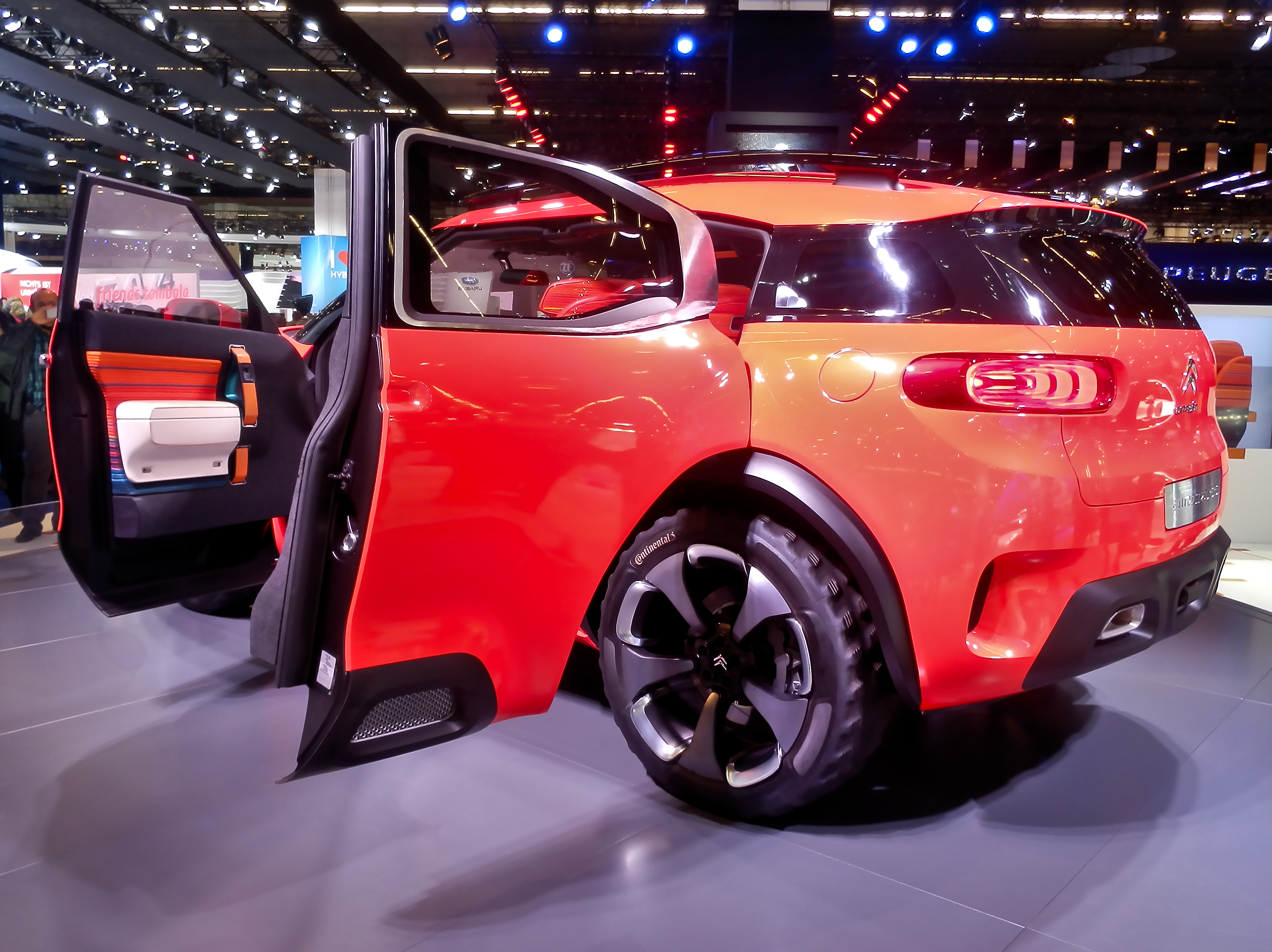
Rear view

=== Safety ===
ANCAP test results* Citroen C5 Aircross all variants (2019, aligned with Euro NCAP)
Test	Points	%
Overall:	5 /5 stars	
Adult occupant:	33.3	87%
Child occupant:	43.6	88%
Pedestrian:	27.9	58%
Safety assist:	9.5	73%

Euro NCAP test results* Citroën C5 Aircross 1.5 HDi Live (LHD) (2019)
Test	Points	%
Overall:	4 /5 stars	
Adult occupant:	33.4	87%
Child occupant:	42.6	86%
Pedestrian:	27.9	58%
Safety assist:	9.8	75%

== Second generation (CR3; 2025) ==
Second generation
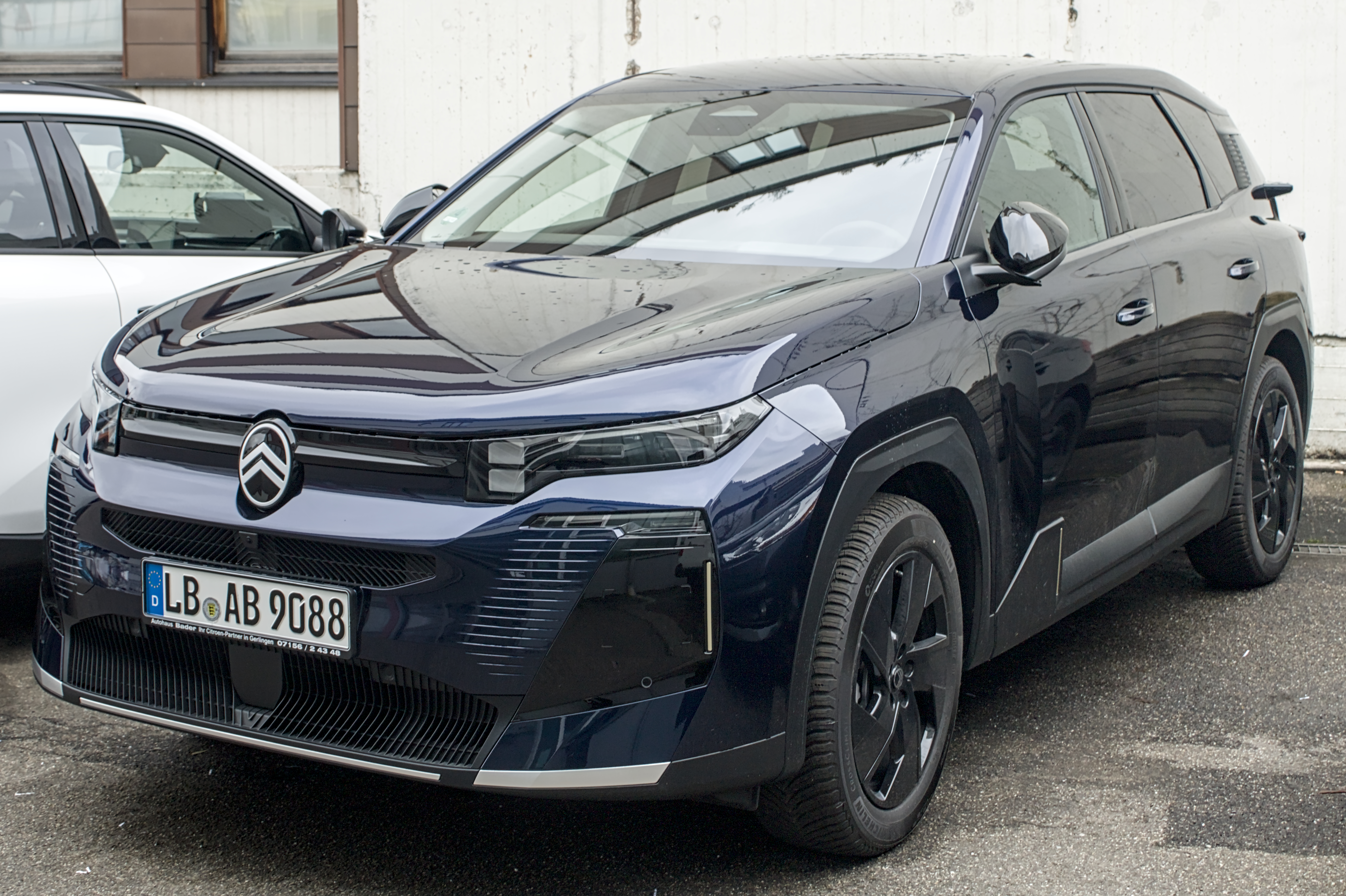

Overview
- Model code: CR3
- Production: October 2025 – present
- Assembly: France: Rennes (Rennes Plant)

Body and chassis
- Layout: Front-engine, front-wheel-drive; Front-motor, front-wheel drive (ë-C5 Aircross)
- Platform: STLA Medium
- Related: Jeep Compass; Opel Grandland; Peugeot 3008 III; Peugeot 5008 III

Powertrain
- Engine: Petrol: 1.2 L EB2DTS turbo I3; 1.6 L EP6FADTXD turbo I4
- Transmission: 6-speed e-DCT; 7-speed e-DCT; 1-speed direct-drive fixed gear ratio (ë-C5 Aircross)
- Hybrid drivetrain: Mild hybrid (Hybrid); Plug-in hybrid (Plug-In Hybrid)
- Battery: 21.5 kWh plug-in, 73.7 kWh or 97 kWh (Electric)

Dimensions
- Wheelbase: 2,784 mm (109.6 in)
- Length: 4,652 mm (183.1 in)
- Width: 1,970 mm (77.6 in)
- Height: 1,650 mm (65.0 in)
- Kerb weight: 1,554–2,109 kg (3,426–4,650 lb)

=== Concept model ===
The second-generation C5 Aircross concept was unveiled on 14 October 2024 at the 2024 Paris Motor Show.

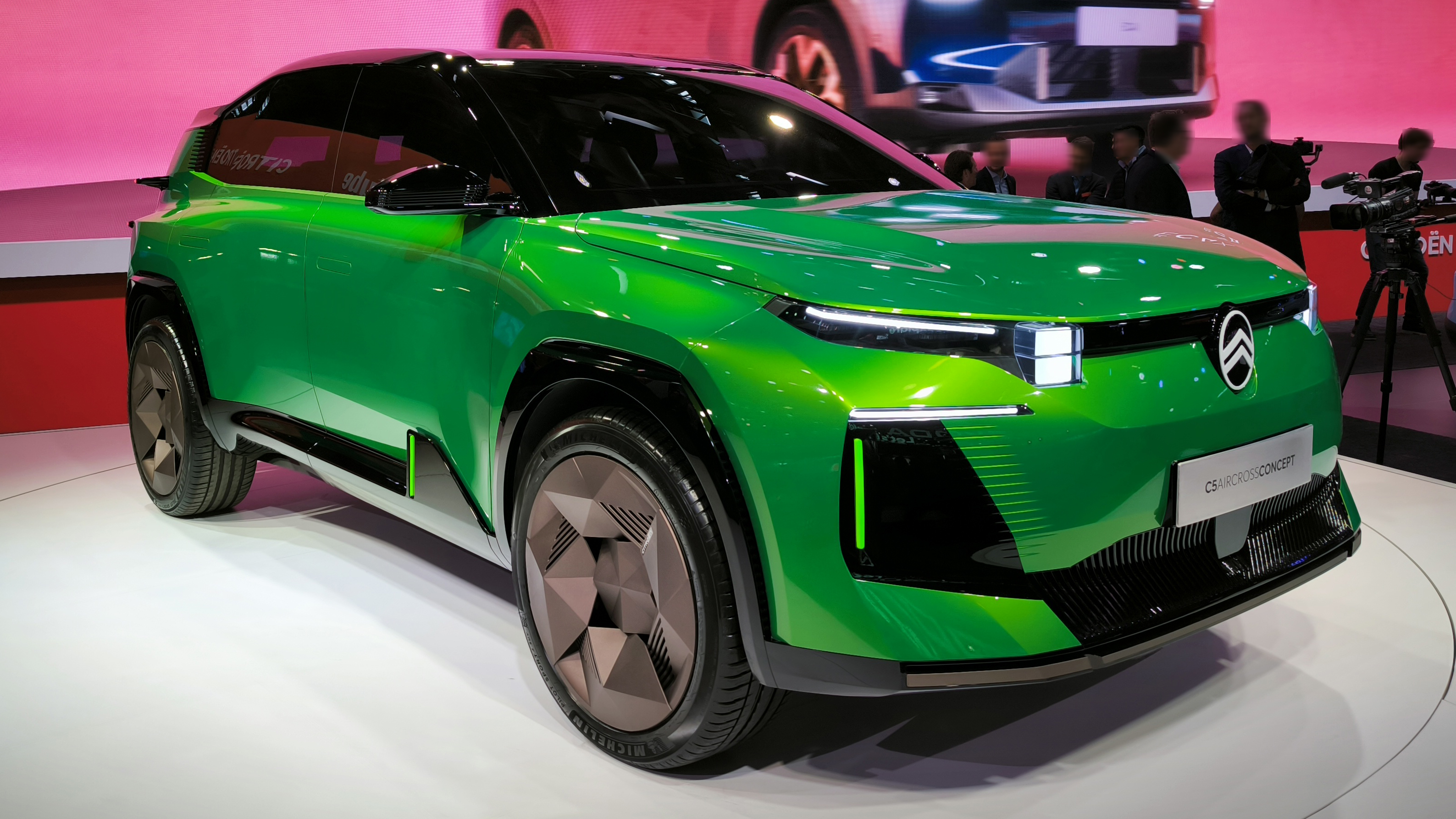
Citroën C5 Aircross Concept

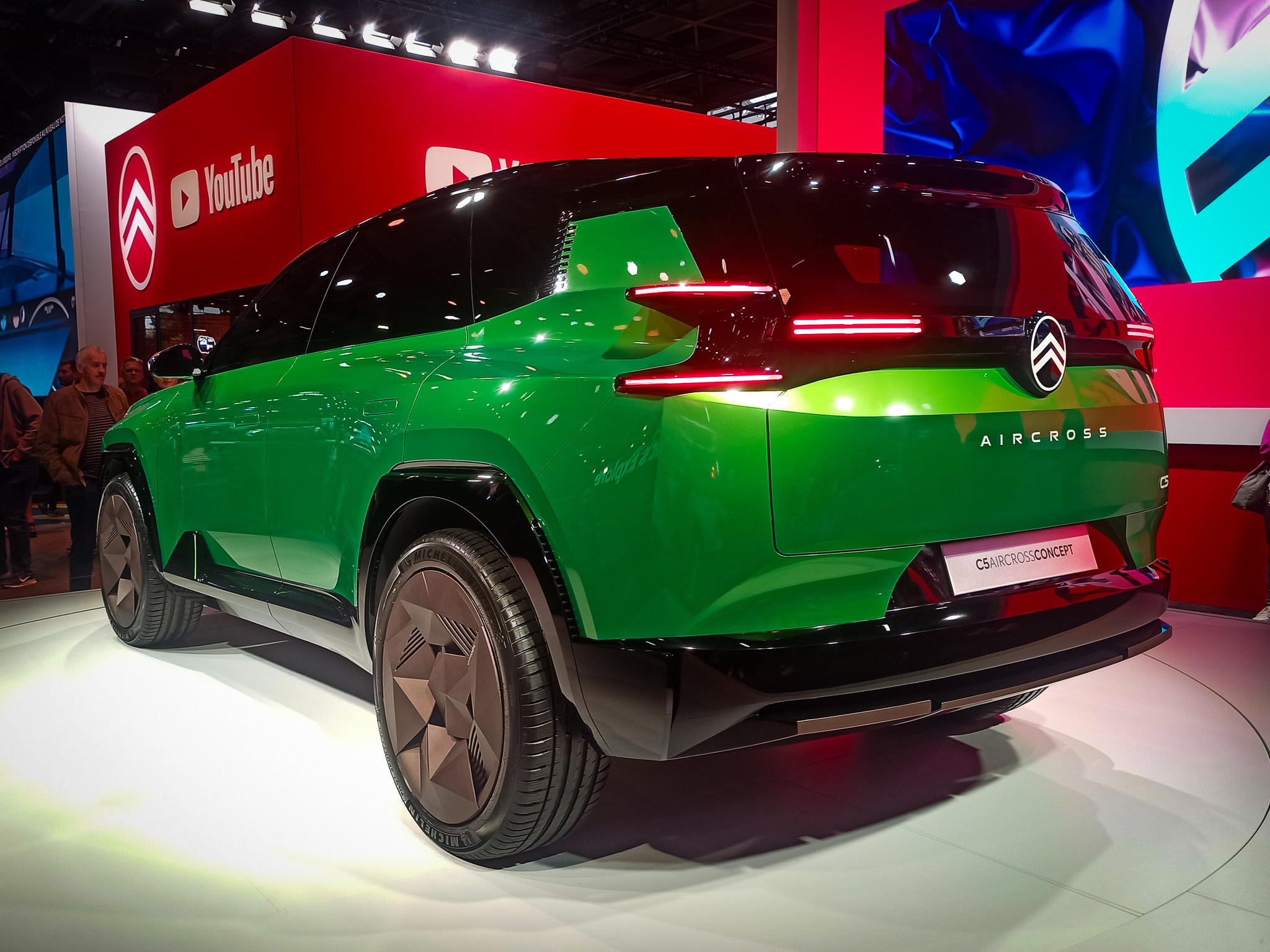
Rear view

=== Production model ===
The second-generation C5 Aircross was unveiled on 29 April 2025, with pre-orders opened in June 2025 and deliveries set to commenced in the final quarter of 2025. The second-generation model is the fifth vehicle to be based on the Stellantis' SLTA Medium platform, shared with the Jeep Compass, Opel Grandland and Peugeot 3008/5008. Like the previous generation, the second-generation model continued to be produced at the Rennes Plant in Rennes, France.

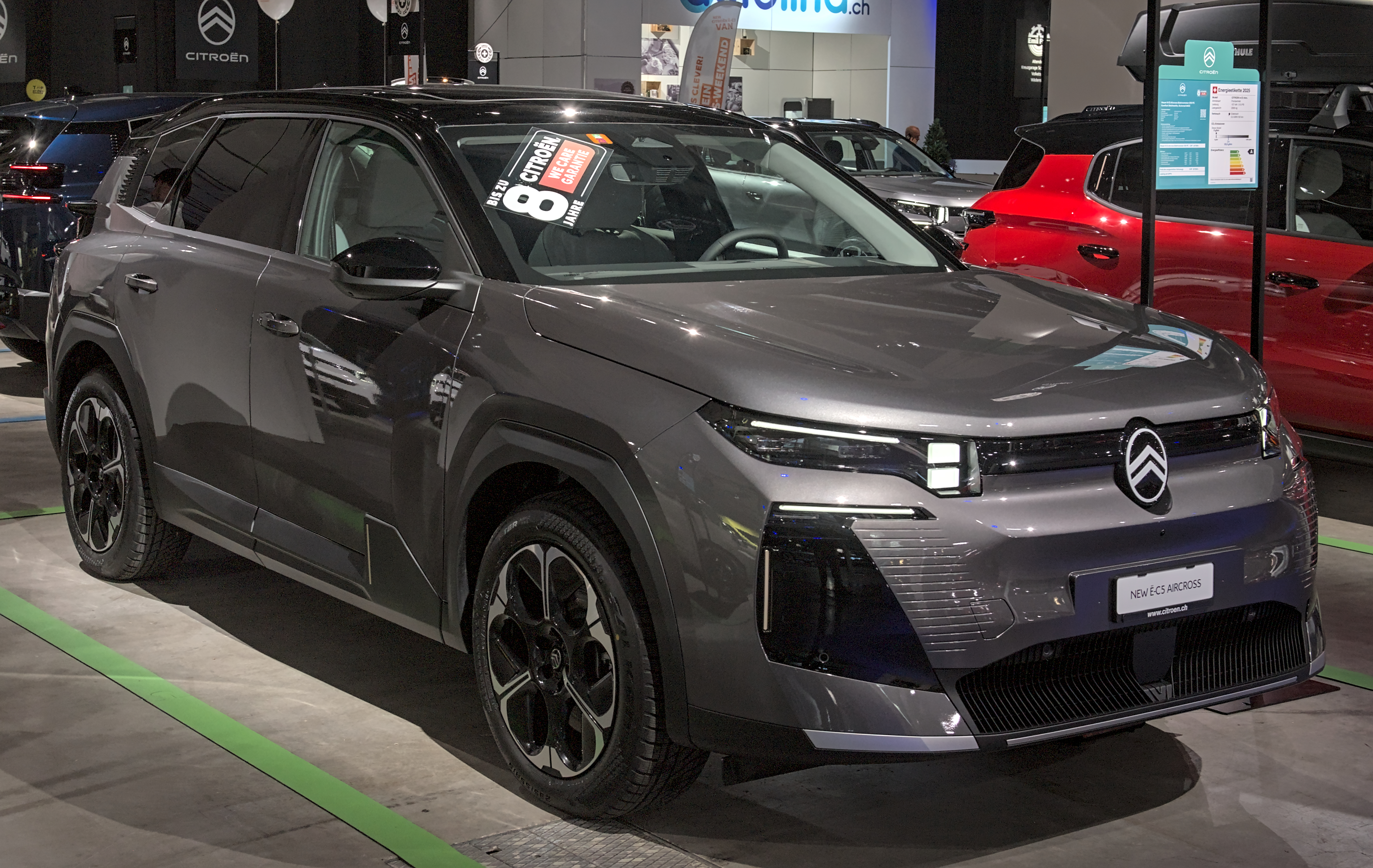
Citroën ë-C5 Aircross

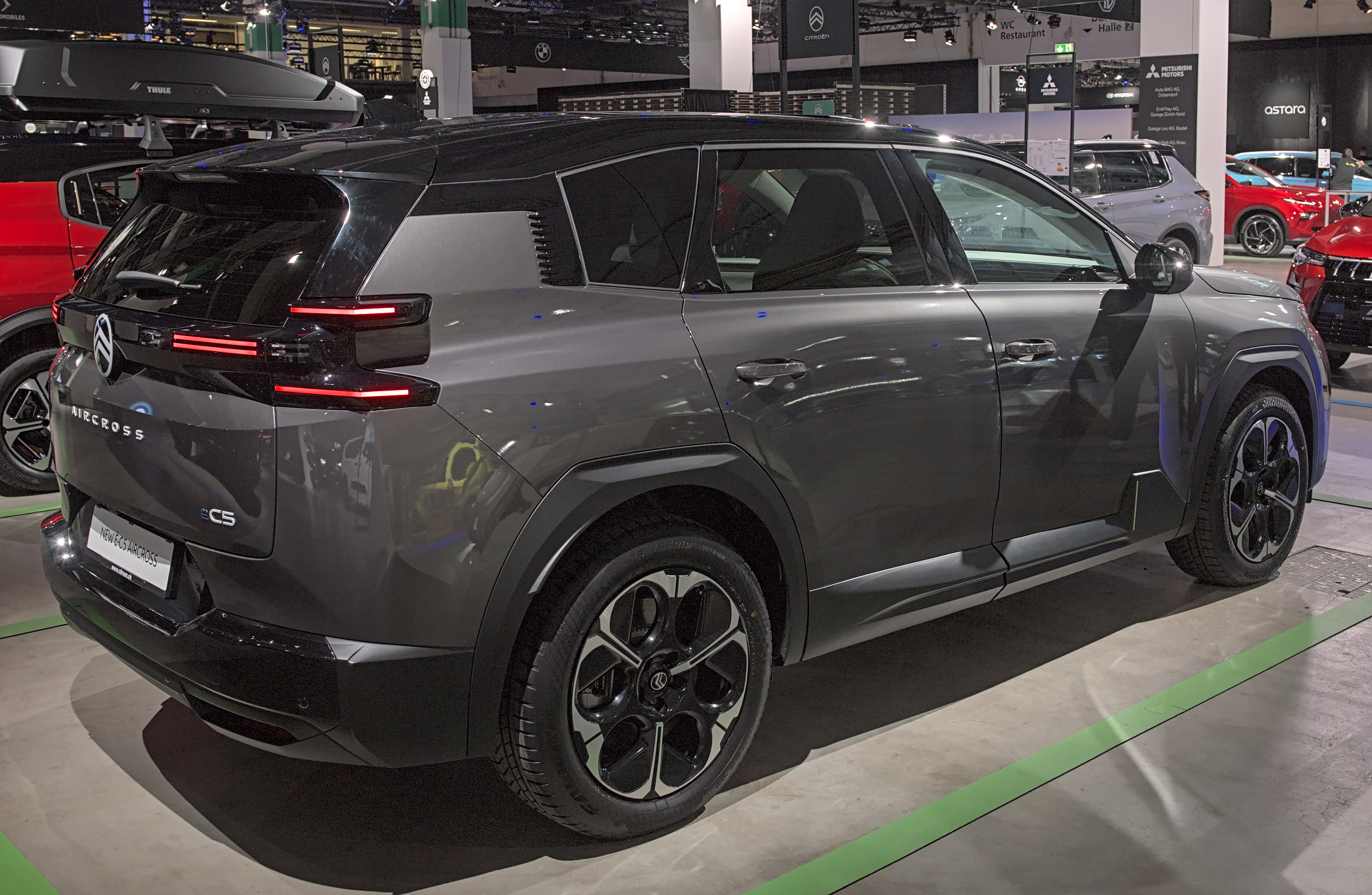
Rear view

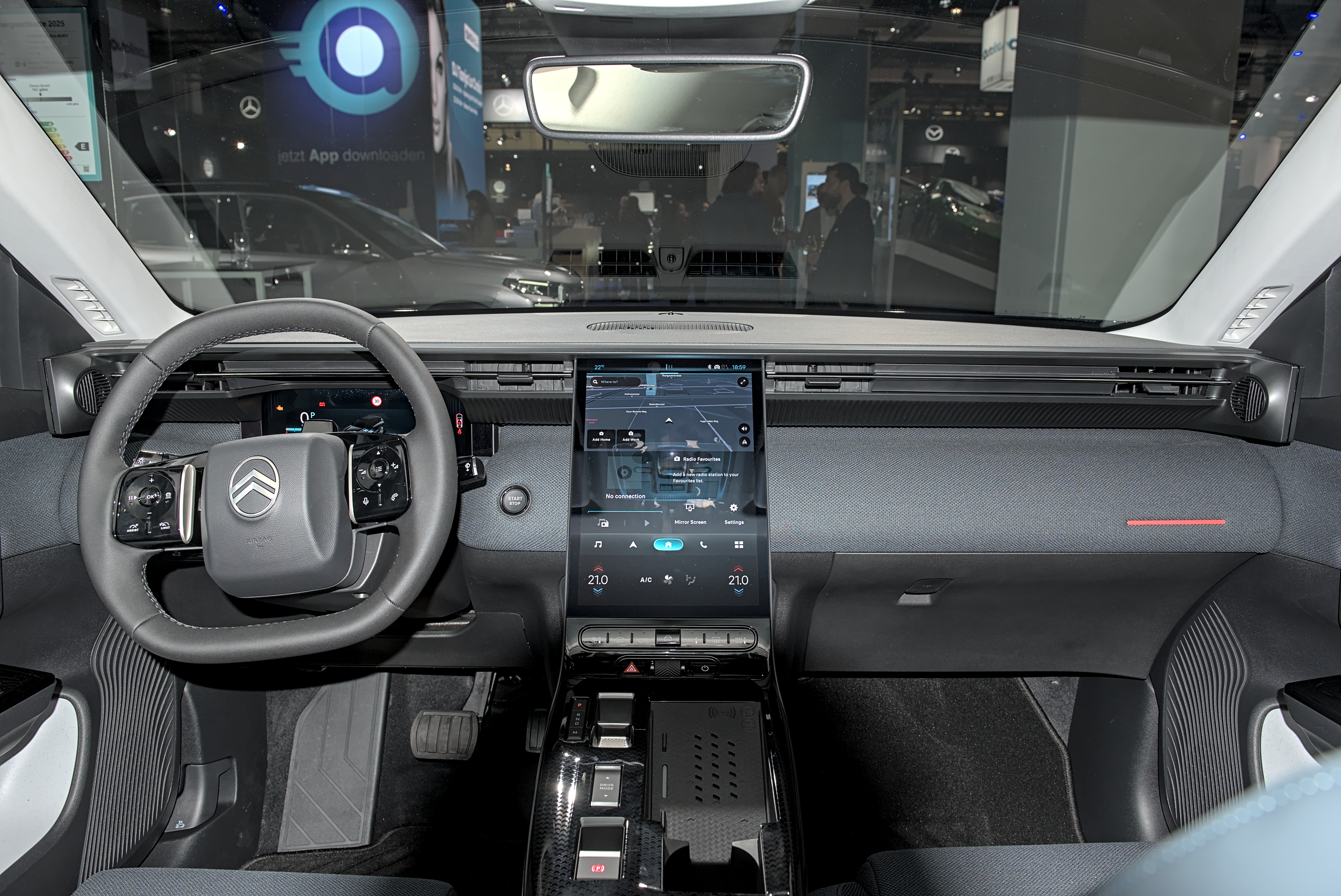
Interior

==== Development ====
Sébastien Moraux, the C5 Aircross product manager, justified the choice for the C5 Aircross to use the SLTA Medium platform instead of an entry-level platform to meet the vehicle's ambitions, particularly in terms of electric range. This platform choice has enabled Citroën to offer a true C-segment crossover SUV while retaining its core values which is comfort. This is reflected with the integration of the Advanced Comfort suspension, seats with revised padding, and a carefully designed interior that contributed to a serene on-board experience.

"We didn't want to undertake the sole development of a platform. So, we aligned with the platform of others because we needed to offer a vehicle with greater electric range, and this platform allowed us to achieve 500 to 680 km."

The C5 Aircross line-up was simplified with three trim levels and a limited number of options, along with the availability of four powertrains. Price accessibility was also a priority, with its price positioning lower than that of the previous model.

Unlike the Berlingo and C3 Aircross, the second-generation C5 Aircross is not available with the seven-seat configuration. Moraux explained that integrating seven seats within the chosen length of the C5 Aircross would have compromised the comfort of the rear passengers, and the rear design with its rather "fastback" roofline after the second row seats would have required lengthening the vehicle, impacting aerodynamics. Citroën has therefore prioritised a compromise between interior space and size, considered its configuration to be the most relevant.

==== Design ====
The exterior of the production model largely identical to the C5 Aircross Concept previewed at the 2024 Paris Motor Show and the design team, was led by Pierre Leclercq.

The front fascia features two horizontal strips and two cubes forms the LED daytime running lights and surround the matrix LED headlights which are optional. The lighting setup contains 20 LEDs which automatically switch on and off to avoid dazzling oncoming traffic or the driver from road sign reflections. The front also features Citroën's new logo, moulded grooves on the front bumper mimics the grille's chevron pattern, and the front end is completely closed to optimise aerodynamic efficiency.

The second-generation C5 Aircross retains the two-box silhouette of the previous model, but with a focus on aerodynamics. The side features a character line traced in a single gesture, which runs from front to back. The roofline is sloped after the second row seats, a design aimed at optimising aerodynamics while preserving interior space. The ground clearance is 200 mm (7.9 in) and the first Citroën vehicle to be available with 20-inch alloy wheels. However, the flushed door handles featured on the concept car were not retained for the production car due to economic reasons.

The rear fascia features Citroën Light Wings, which consists of three red horizontal strakes and was featured on the concept car and the gloss black panel on the upright hatch, echoes the front fascia design.

"I think the light signature will be a landmark of the car," Citroën CEO Thierry Koskas told Auto Express about the taillights. "It’s beautiful, it’s very original. We would never have shown the rear light [on the 2024 concept] if it wasn’t on the production car, because it’s such a strong feature and we really wanted to have it."

==== Interior ====
The interior of the C5 Aircross was designed to be a 'C-Zen Lounge' inside, where "occupants are seated as if in a living room". The dashboard has been designed with influence from traditional living room furniture, with distinctive foam fabric padding reminiscent of a sofa and available in light or dark colours.

The lower part of the dashboard is covered in a high quality foam fabric that extends to the door panels and seats. Some of the interior plastics in the door and centre console storage areas are made from using 20% vine shoots "sourced from organic vineyards in Burgundy and processed locally", therefore the C5 Aircross is the first car in the automotive industry to incorporate vine shoots into its design. Overall, there are 160 kg (350 lb) of recycled metal parts, 47 kg (104 lb) of plastics made from environmentally friendly materials, and the seat covers are made from recycled fabrics.

Inside, there is a 10-inch digital driver display, Advanced Comfort seats with new electrically adjustable side bolsters on the front seats fitted for the first time, ambient lighting with eight different colours (a first for a Citroën vehicle), "Cascade Screen" HD touchscreen infotainment system (the largest sized touchscreen fitted in a Stellantis vehicle) with wireless Android Auto and Apple CarPlay connectivity, an extended Head-Up Display, ChatGPT and "Hello Citroën" voice recognition system, a panoramic sunroof, and heated rear seats (a first for a Citroën vehicle). The C5 Aircross does not have AGR certification for the seating, unlike some Opel and Peugeot models, Moraux clarified that Citroën prioritised its own synthesis of comfort.

The maximum boot space is 1,668 L (58.9 cu ft), there is a 75 L (2.6 cu ft) storage space under the adjustable boot floor, and also 40 L (1.4 cu ft) of additional storage spaces inside the cabin. Unlike the previous model, the second-generation C5 Aircross does not feature the three independent rear seats which slide and recline independently, instead it has a fixed bench seat. Moraux explained this change as a result of an architectural constraint between the 20-inch wheels and the sliding rail mechanism, therefore this led to weight savings and a lower seating position while improving interior space. However, the rear seat backrests can recline between 21° and 33°, and the rear seats can still fold down separately in a 40/20/40 format.

==== Powertrains ====
Like the previous model, the C5 Aircross comes standard with the Advanced Comfort suspension with Progressive Hydraulic Cushions with two progressive cushions placed on each front shock absorber, which absorbs imperfections on the road and provide a "magic carpet" driving feel.

The Hybrid model can fully automatically manage between the two motors, with the electric motor assisting the combustion engine at low speeds and both motors work together at a steady speed to optimise fuel consumption. When driving in town or manoeuvring, the Hybrid model can operated in 100% electric mode if the battery charge level allows, while the battery recharges automatically during deceleration.

The Hybrid Rechargeable model has both a combustion engine and electric motor which can operate together or separately, depending on the driving conditions and driver's needs. There are three driving modes: Hybrid (the default mode with automatic management of the powertrains), Electric (100% operational electric mode), and Sport (maximum performance mode).

The flexibility of the STLA Medium platform allows Citroën to offer a range of electric powertrains suitable to meet the diverse needs of European consumers. There are three driving modes: Normal (default mode), Eco (optimises electric range by reducing in-car vehicle functions), and Sport (maximum performance mode with 100% power and torque). The ë-C5 Aircross is equipped with an EV trip planner for the connected navigation system, heat pump, and a three-level regenerative braking system that optimises the car's kinetic energy to recharge the battery using the steering wheel paddle shifters.

Model	Powertrain	Engine/Motor	Battery	Transmission	Charging
C5 Aircross Hybrid 145	Mild Hybrid	1.2-litre 3-cyl turbo (143 bhp)	48V mild hybrid	6-speed dual-clutch automatic	–
C5 Aircross Plug-In Hybrid 195	Plug-in Hybrid	1.6-litre 4-cyl turbo (192 hp)	21 kWh	7-speed dual-clutch automatic	Plug-in charging
e-C5 Aircross (Standard)	Electric	211 bhp electric motor	73 kWh	Single-speed	160 kW DC fast charging
e-C5 Aircross (Extended)	Electric	228 bhp electric motor	97 kWh	Single-speed	160 kW DC fast charging

==== Safety ====
For safety, the C5 Aircross is available with the Drive Assist 2.0 driver-assistance package which also enables Level 2 autonomous driving, it consists of features such as the driver surveillance camera, an extended blind spot detection, rear traffic alert and semi-automatic lane changing. Depending on the variant, the C5 Aircross is available with the VisioPark which consists of eight parking sensors and a reversing camera with three viewing modes, it can also be upgraded to the VisioPark 360° package which combines four cameras for a 360° surround view of the vehicle.

===== Euro NCAP =====
Euro NCAP test results Peugeot e-3008 73kWh (LHD) (2025)
Test	Points	%
Overall:	4 /5 stars	
Adult occupant:	32.4	80%
Child occupant:	42.0	85%
Pedestrian:	50.2	79%
Safety assist:	11.3	62%

=== Markets ===
==== European Union ====
The C5 Aircross was launched in October 2025 in four trim levels: You, Plus, Business and Max, powered by a petrol 1.2L EB2DTS turbo I3 and a 1.6L EP6FADTXD turbo I4 engines.

==== Argentina ====
The C5 Aircross was launched in May 2026 in one trim level: Max, powered by a petrol 1.6L EP6FADTXD turbo I4 engine, it is the first vehicle with 50% less duties imported to Argentina thanks to Mercosur-UE agreement.

== Sales ==
Year	Europe (Note: Europe: 2020 EU 27 + UK + Switzerland + Norway + Iceland)	Turkey	Egypt	China	India
2017				22,603	
2018	2,562			23,340	
2019	79,533	12,033		16,088	
2020	69,750	8,431		9,779	
2021	54,346	3,890		9,963	
2022	44,997	5,239		6,365	775
2023		8,434		3,691	301
2024		7,091	460	6,747	9
2025		6,671	1,045	2,795	
