= Citroën Eco 2000 =

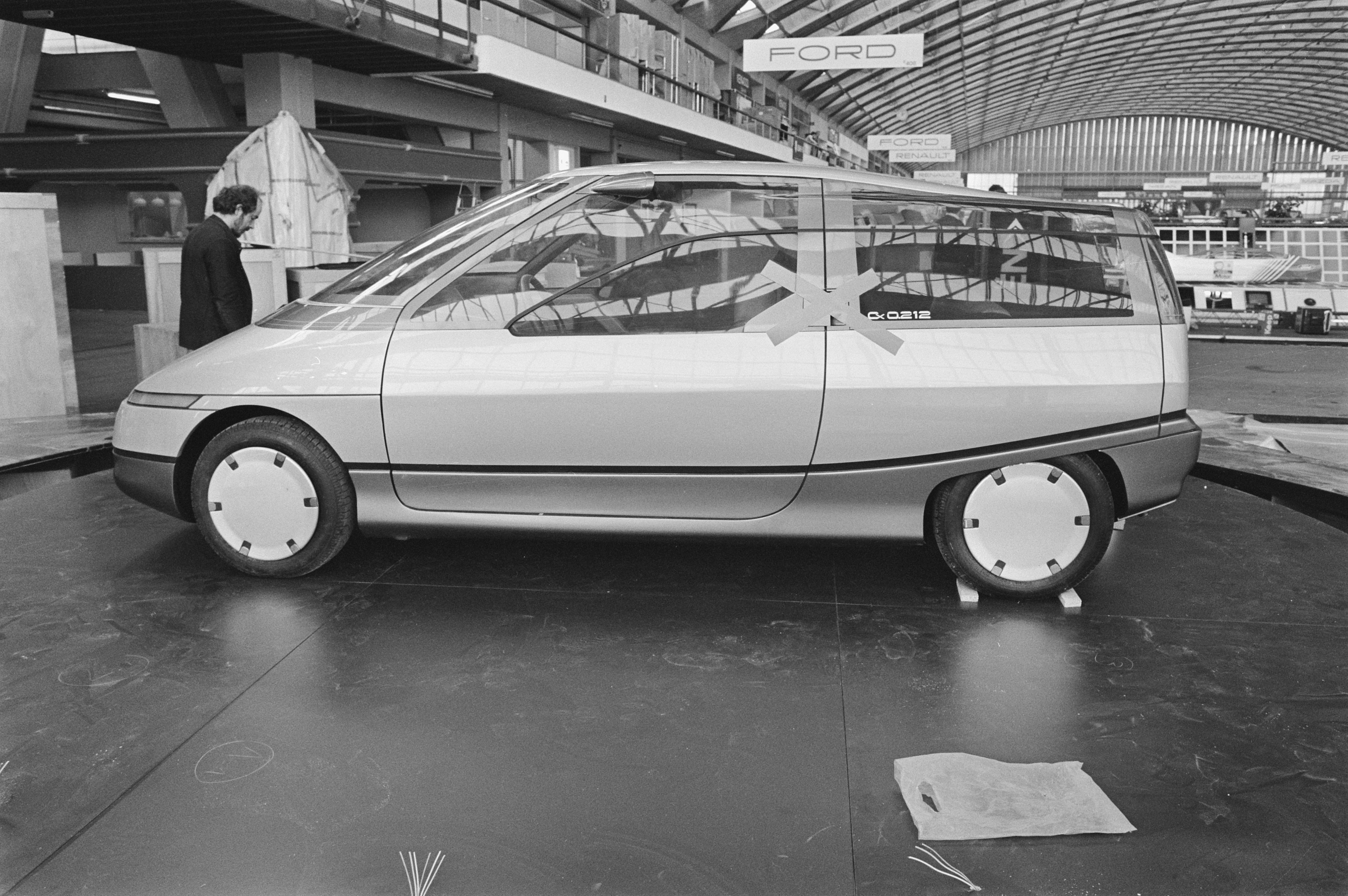
Eco 2000 SL 10, the final iteration of the Eco 2000 project

The Citroen Eco 2000 was a project by Citroën that resulted series of concept cars to demonstrate the French car manufacturer's design and technology with aerodynamics and efficiency and started in 1981.

The Eco 2000 name covers four distinct models which show the evolution of Citroën's thinking: In 1982 the SA 103, in 1983 the SA 117, and in March 1984 with the SA 109. Later in October 1984 came the fourth and final version known as the SL10.

The project was part funded by the French government with £30 million over five years and was staffed from 120 engineers across the whole of PSA Group to form the Directory of Research and Scientific Affairs.

== Project development ==
=== Eco 2000 SA 103 ===
The first public concept car from Citroën in the Eco 2000 programme was first shown in March 1982. This was a very short 3.04m long and weighed a very low 430kg and the plastic body ha a drag co-efficient of 0.267 and could reach an average of 80.7mpg. It was powered by the 652cc engine of the Citroen 2CV.

=== Eco 2000 SA 119 ===
The second version of the Eco 2000 was shown in March 1983. The longer body resolved some of the constraints of the first model such as providing some luggage space but also a slippier design with a drag co-effiecnt of 0.21. The engine size increased to 704cc but generated only 25bhp. Weighing just 10kg than the first model, the SA 119 could reach a claimed 88mph and managed an average of 94mpg.

=== Eco 2000 SA 109 ===
The third Eco 2000 was shown in March 1984. Powered by a new 3-cylinder 750cc petrol engine producing 35 bhp at 4750 rpm; which is a smaller version of the 1.0-litre engine jointly developed by Fiat and Peugeot. The car's design evolved into a very aerodynamic shape with a drag co-efficient of 0.21 bt improving the usability of the car. The car's weight increased to 480kg and the efficiency dropped to 80.7mpg.

=== Eco 2000 SL 10 ===
The SL 10 is the final version that was displayed at British Motor Show in October 1984 and featured a further revised design with a distinctive roof line. The low drag co-effiency of 0.212 was displayed in the side windows. The prototype was sold in 2017.

== Gallery ==
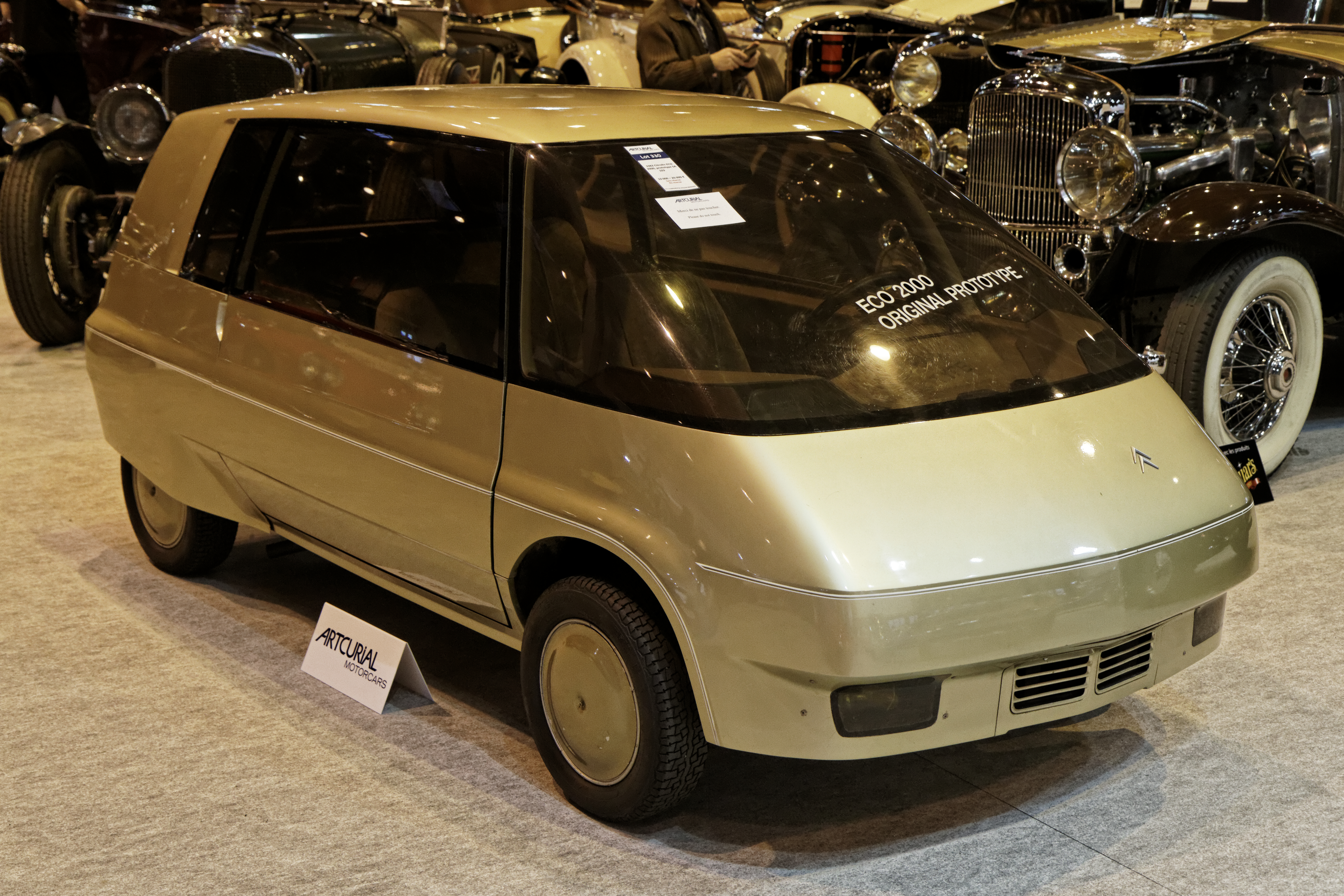

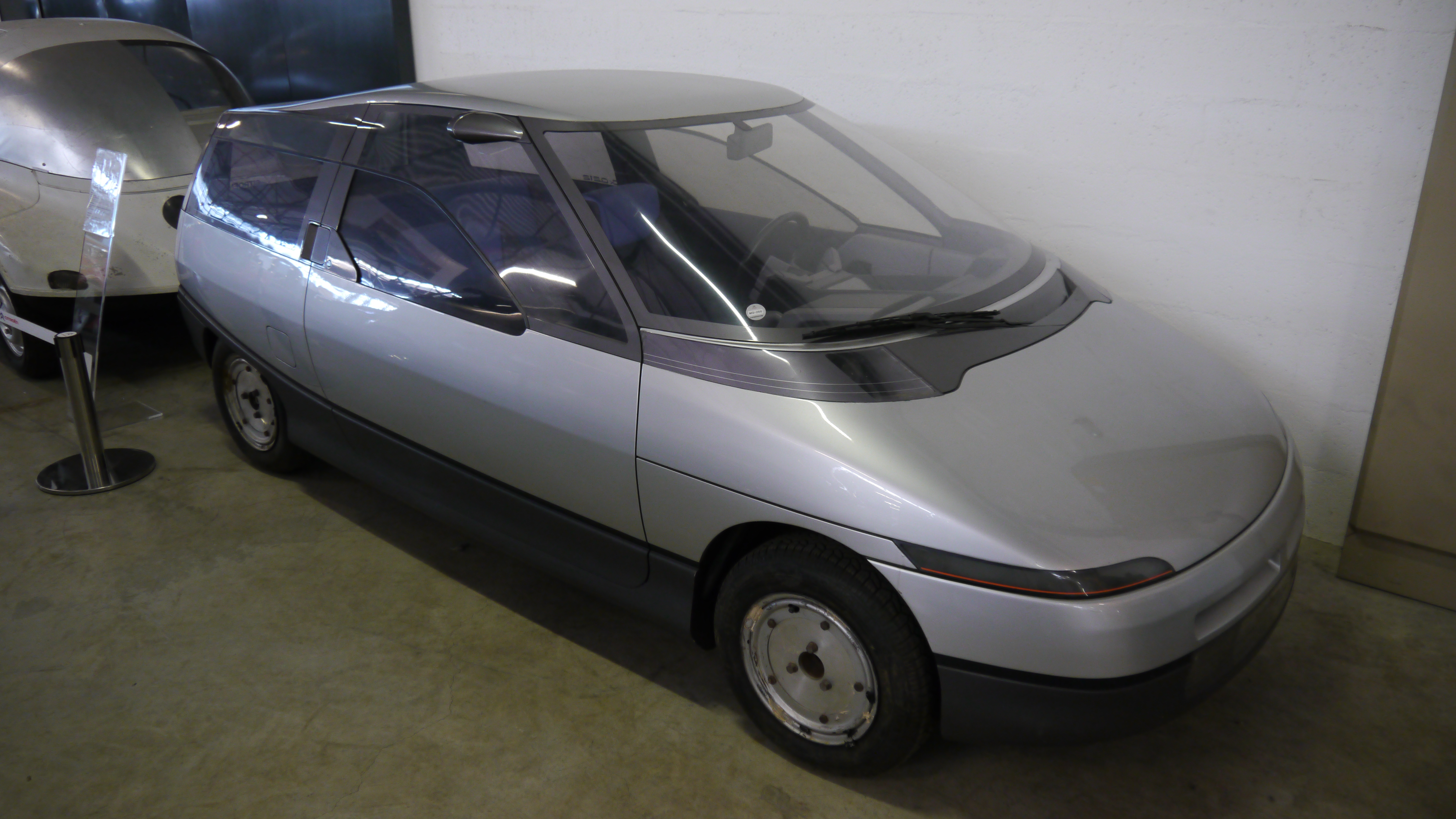
