= Citroën 19 19 Concept =

19_19 Concept

Overview
- Manufacturer: Citroën
- Production: 2019
- Designer: Romain Gauvin (exterior); Jérémy Lebonnois (interior); Raphaël le Masson Pannetrat (interior)

Body and chassis
- Class: concept car

Dimensions
- Wheelbase: 3,100 mm (122 in)
- Length: 4,655 mm (183 in)
- Width: 2,240 mm (88 in)
- Height: 1,600 mm (63 in)

The Citroën 19_19 Concept is an electric concept car developed by the French manufacturer Citroën presented on the occasion of its centenary.

== Presentation ==
The 19_19 Concept was presented on 13 May 2019 at the Viva Technology show at the Paris expo Porte de Versailles, in Paris. The Citroën 19_19 celebrates the centenary of the manufacturer founded on 20 June 1919. It follows on from the Ami One concept car presented at the 2019 Geneva Motor Show which also celebrates Citroën's 100th anniversary.

== Premise ==
The 19_19 Concept was designed with the primary premise of acting as a futuristic demonstration of an electric vehicle with an emphasis on comfort. According to Citroën, the vehicle would have a range of comfort-centric features, including a "smart suspension system", heated seats, a digital personal assistant, individual sound zones for each passenger and others, on top of 800 km of range, Level 4 Autonomy as per the classifications introduced by SAE International, a 0 to 60 mph time of 5 seconds and a top speed of 200 km/h.

== Design ==
According to Citroën, the 19_19 Concept's design was inspired by aerospace, with what the manufacturer calls a "double prospex bonnet" housing LED headlights that span the front of the vehicle, forming the brand's logo at its center, located above the "Origins" logo. The rear of the vehicle features tail lights that echo the format of the headlights, located between a pair of Lidar sensors located along the back of its roof and a window into some of its internal components. Citroën describes the car's body as resembling a "transparent capsule", and highlights its black and blue color scheme as a nod to the Petite Rosalie. The 19_19 Concept was equipped with 30" wheels (total diameter, including tires of 930mm) designed in conjunction with the Goodyear Tire and Rubber Company, featuring rotating centers that keep the Origins logo upright.
