= Citroën Tulip =

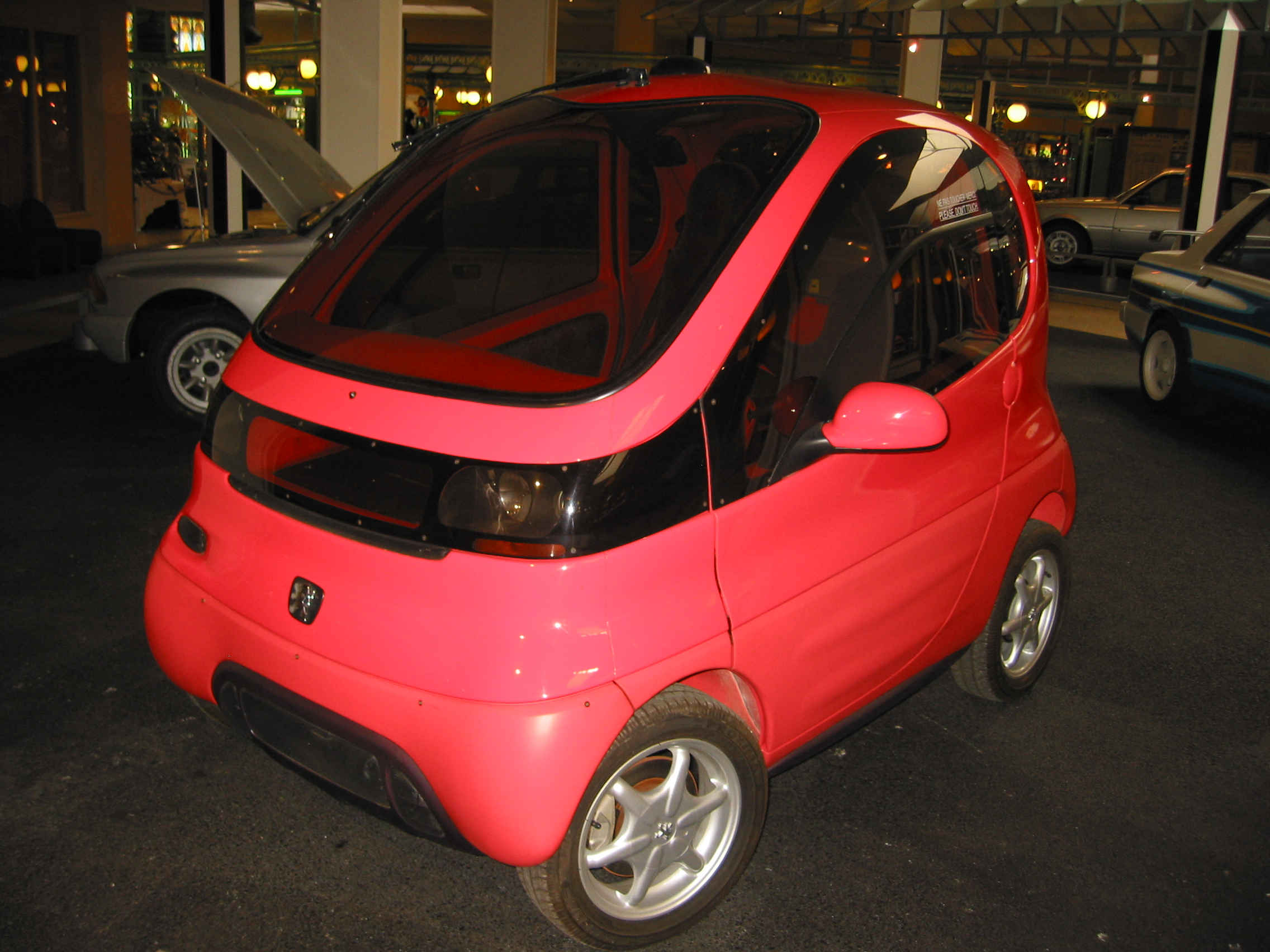
- Peugeot Tulip Concept

Overview
- Manufacturer: Citroën
- Also called: Peugeot Tulip
- Production: 1994

Body and chassis
- Class: Concept car

Powertrain
- Electric motor: 9.8 kW (electric motor)
- Electric range: 72 km (44.7 mi)

Dimensions
- Length: 2,100 mm (82.7 in)

The Citroën Tulip (also badged as the Peugeot Tulip) was a concept car and prototype from 1994, designed and developed by the car manufacturer PSA Peugeot Citroën and its partners Via GTI and Cegelec. Tulip stands for Transport Urbain Libre Individual et Public. The two-seater electric car previewed an hourly rental carsharing system in Tours, France. The small, 2.1m long car was powered by a 9.8 kW motor driving the front wheels.

The car was charged by induction by driving to a designated location. The Tulip had a top speed of 75 km/h (46.6 mph) and a range of 72 km (44.7 mi).
