= GQ by Citroën =

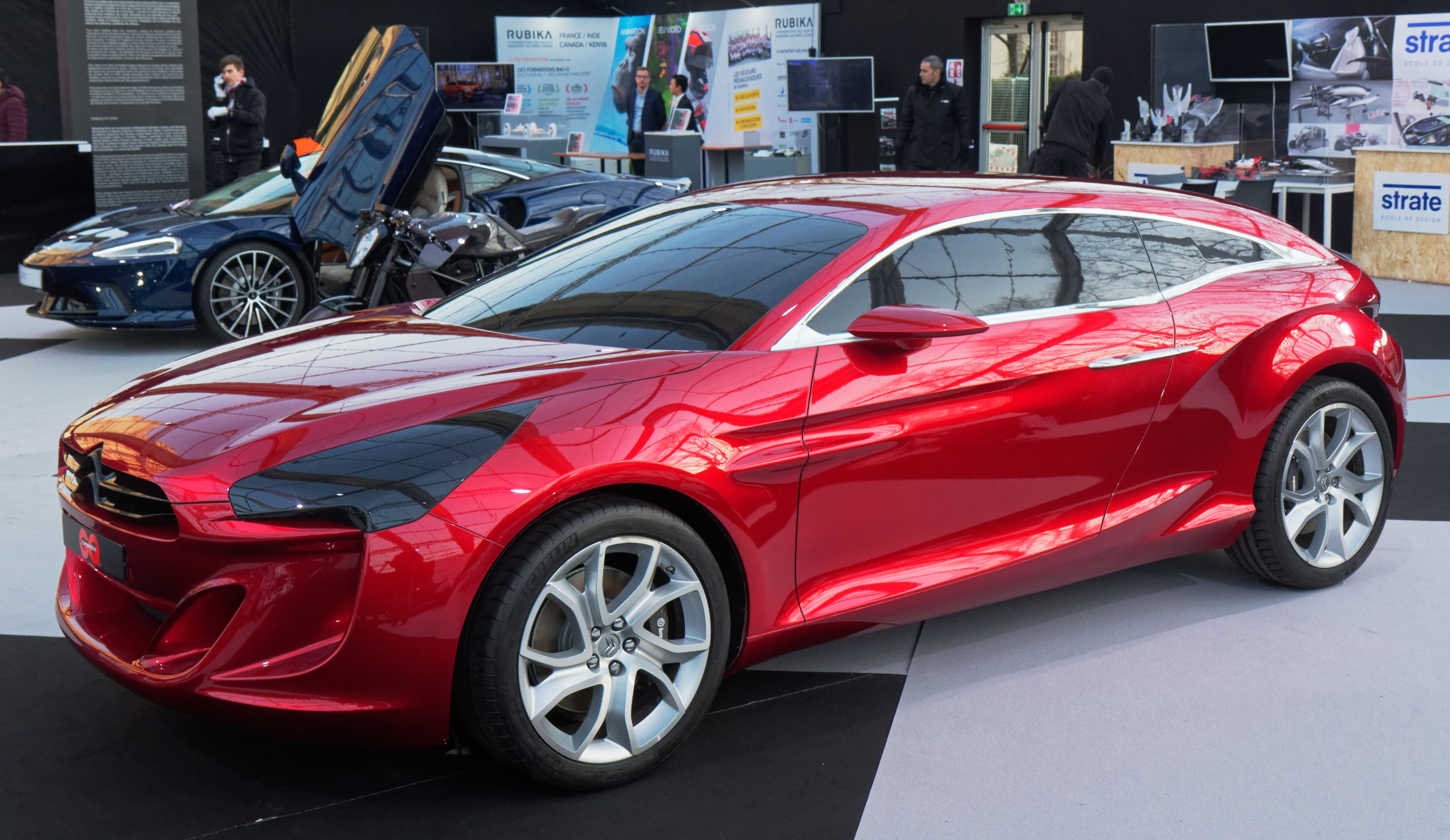

Overview
- Manufacturer: Citroën in cooperation with GQ
- Also called: Citroën GQ
- Production: 2010 (concept car)

Body and chassis
- Class: Compact car (C)
- Body style: 5-door hatchback coupe
- Layout: Front-engine, rear-wheel-drive
- Related: Citroën DS4

GQ by Citroën is a concept compact executive hatchback coupe designed by Citroën for the British market. It was created in cooperation with the magazine GQ. The GQ by Citroën's competitors in real life are the Hyundai Veloster Turbo, Volkswagen Scirocco R and the Renault Mégane R.S.

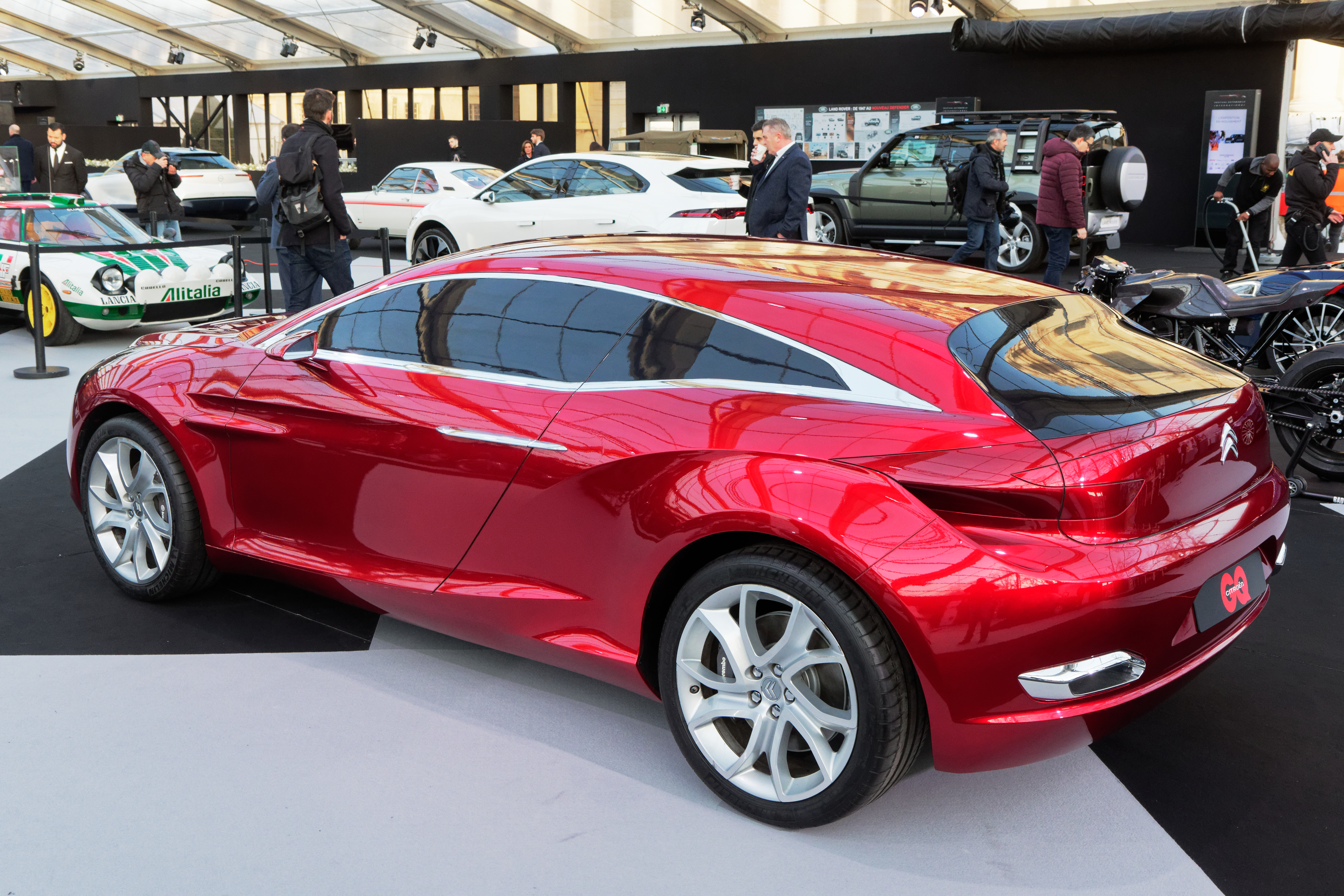
Rear view
