= Citroën Tubik =

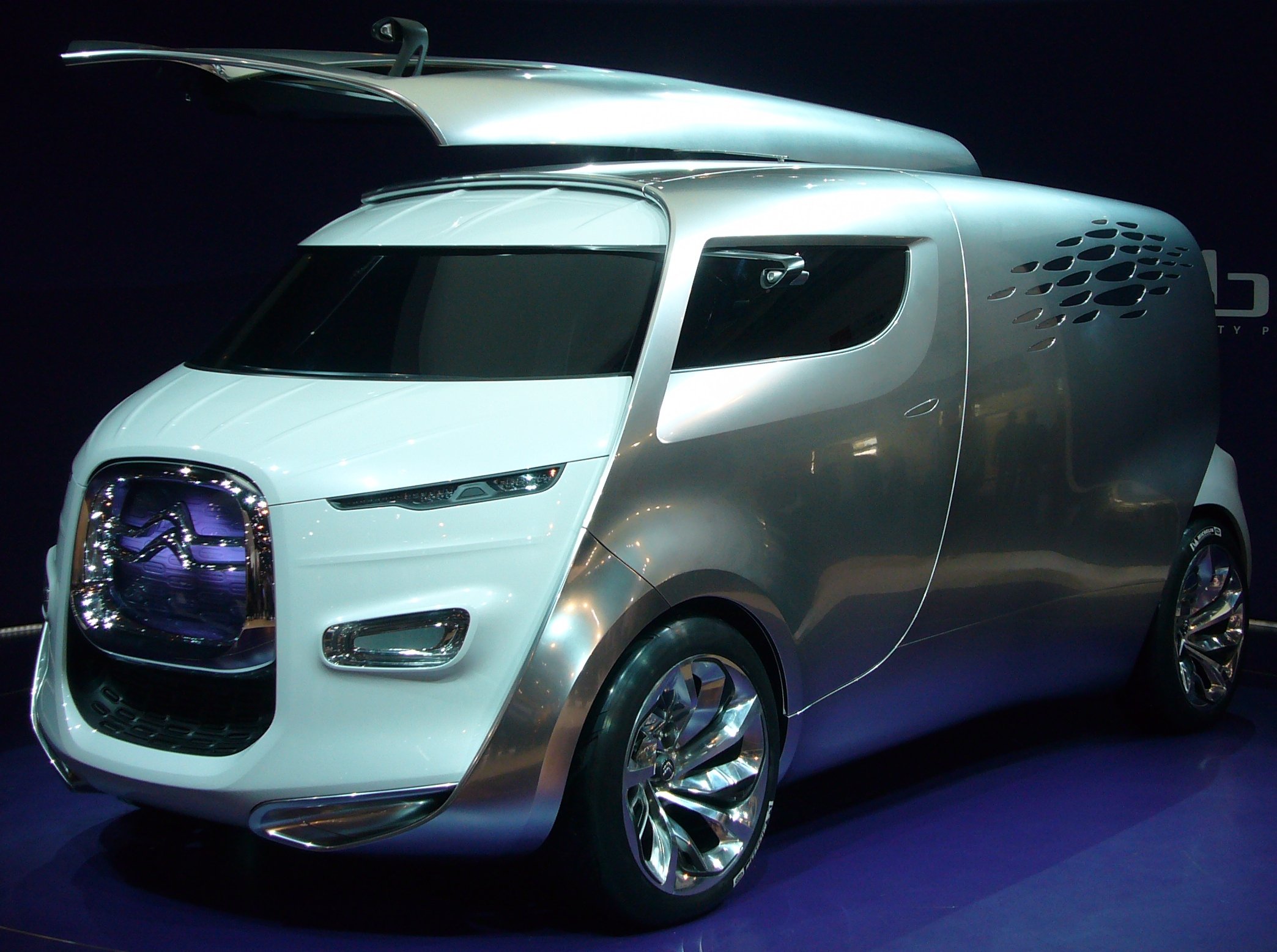

Overview
- Manufacturer: Citroën
- Production: 2011

Body and chassis
- Class: Concept car

Powertrain
- Engine: Diesel engine and electric motor hybrid drivetrain
- Power output: 200hp
- Transmission: 6-speed automatic

The Citroën Tubik is a concept car developed by Citroën. It was presented at the 2011 Frankfurt Motor Show.

== Overview ==
The Tubik was named and styled after the Citroën TUB and the Type H. It is designed to be a futuristic minivan, and is 4.80 m long and 2.08 m wide. It's powered by a Diesel hybrid engine, called “Hybrid4”, derived from the Peugeot 3008. It can accommodate nine people in a modular interior where the central bench seat can be transformed into a bed or a work tablet, while the two front passenger seats can tilt to face the rear passengers.

The Tubik's exterior was designed by Lars Taubert. The interior was developed by designers Pascal Grappey and Guillaume Lemaitre.

== Gallery ==
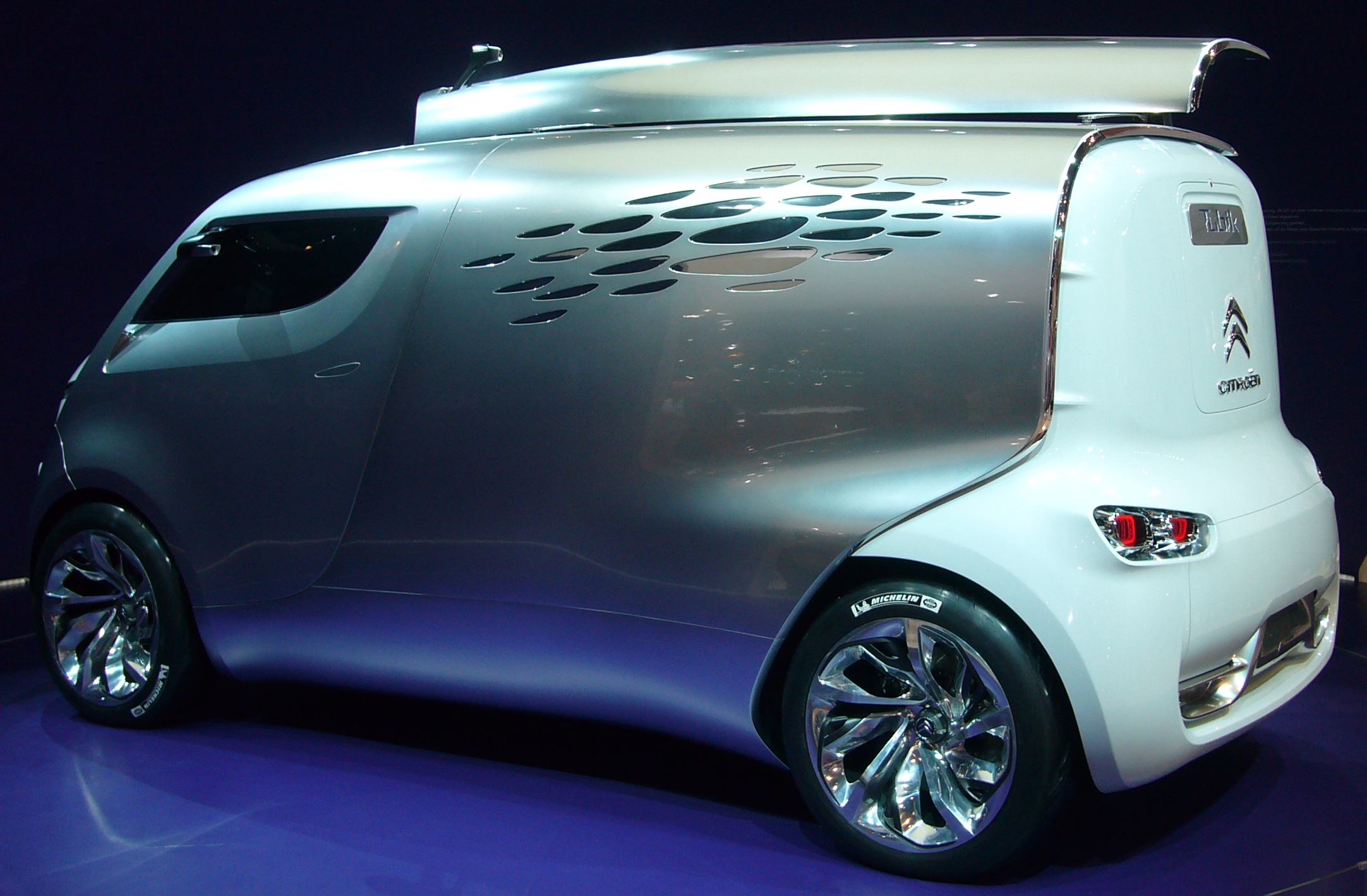
Rear

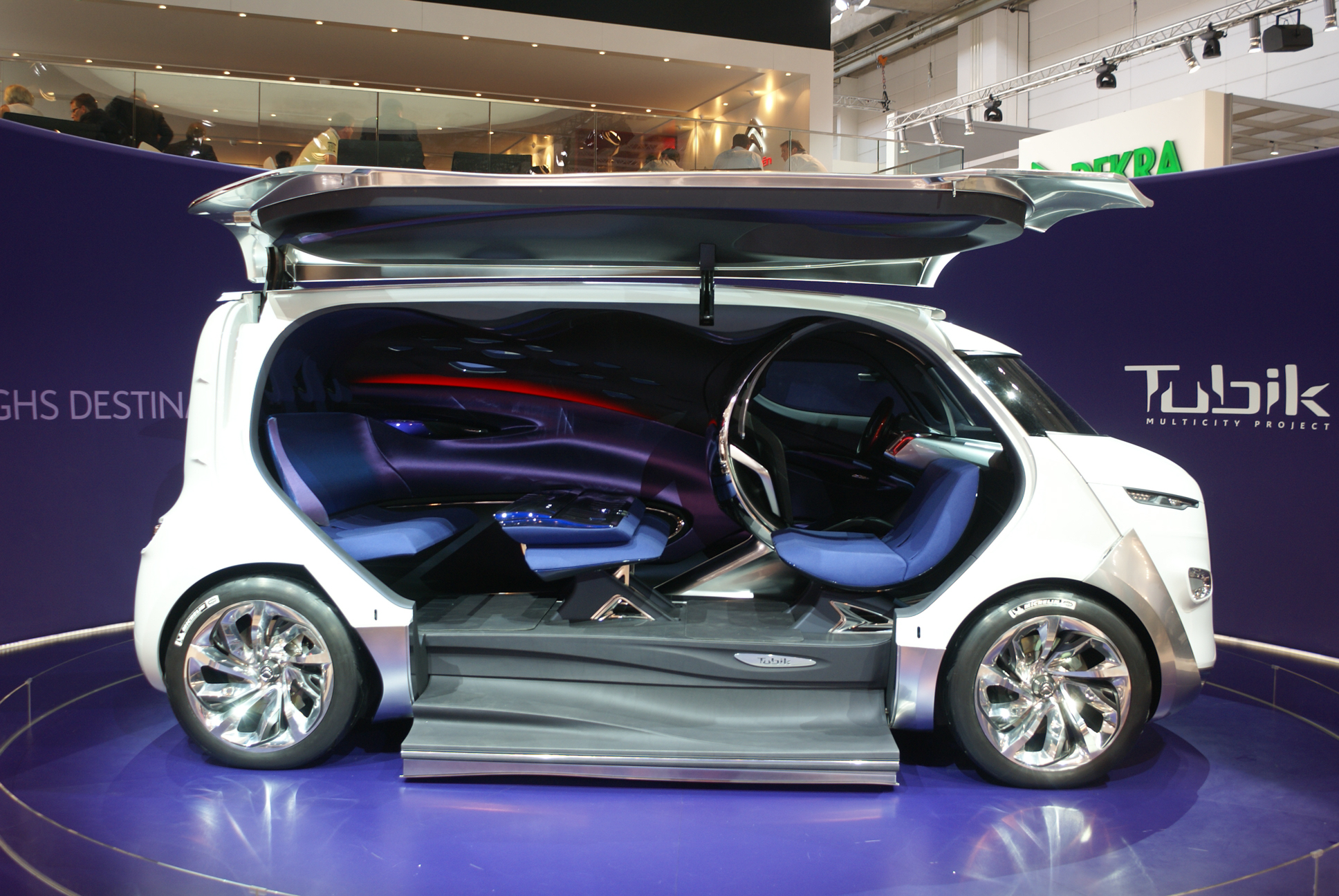
Side view with doors open

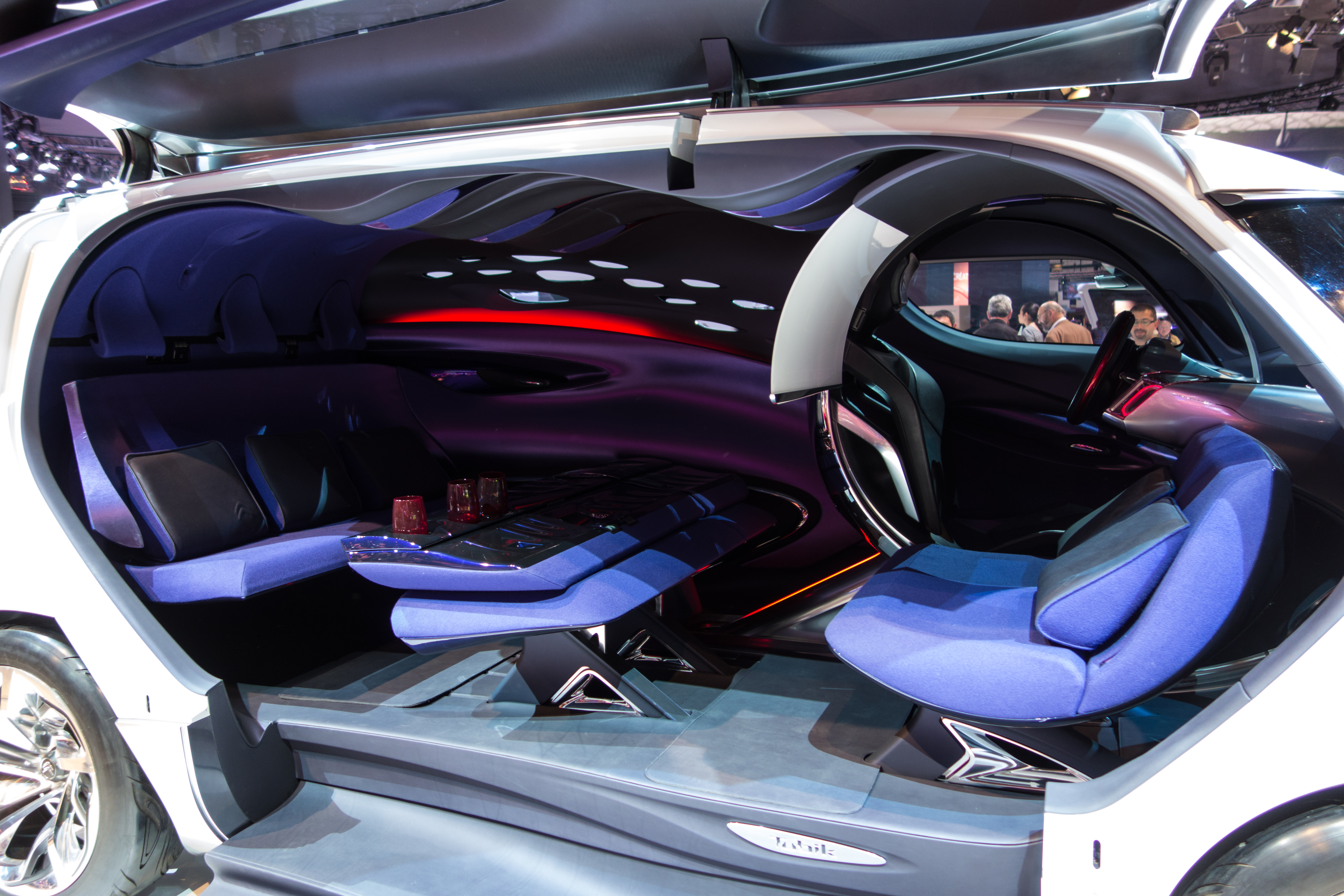
Interior
