= Citroën Technospace =

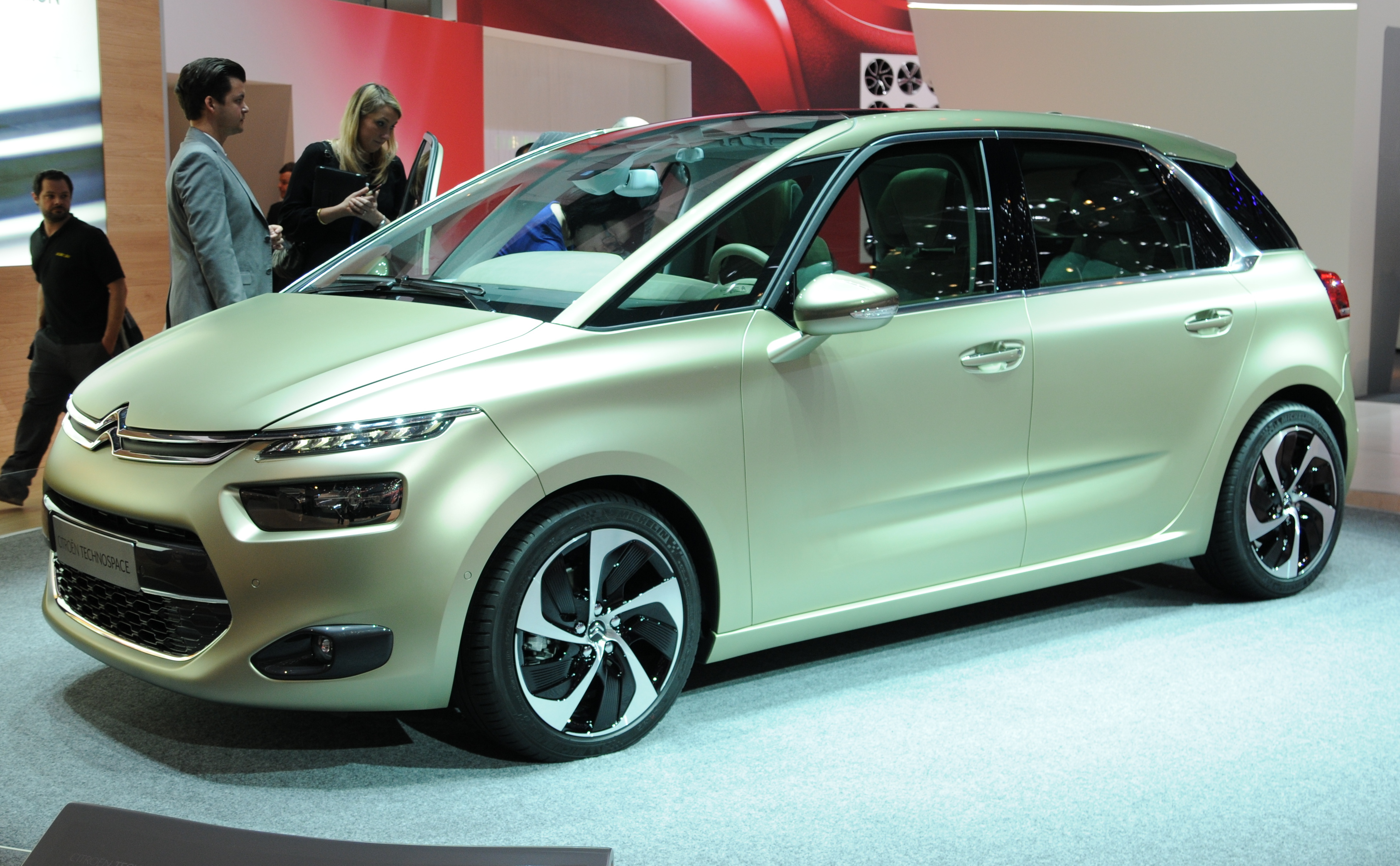
- Technospace at the 2013 Geneva Motor Show

Overview
- Manufacturer: Citroën
- Production: 2013 (concept car)

Body and chassis
- Platform: EMP2

Dimensions
- Wheelbase: 2,783 mm (109.6 in)
- Length: 4,430 mm (174.4 in)
- Width: 1,830 mm (72.0 in)
- Height: 1,610 mm (63.4 in)

The Citroën Technospace is a concept car designed by the French car manufacturer Citroën and announced at the 2013 Geneva Motor Show.

It formed the basis of the second-generation Citroën C4 Picasso, and was the first model to use the new modular "Efficient Modular Platform 2" (EMP2) platform.

== Gallery ==
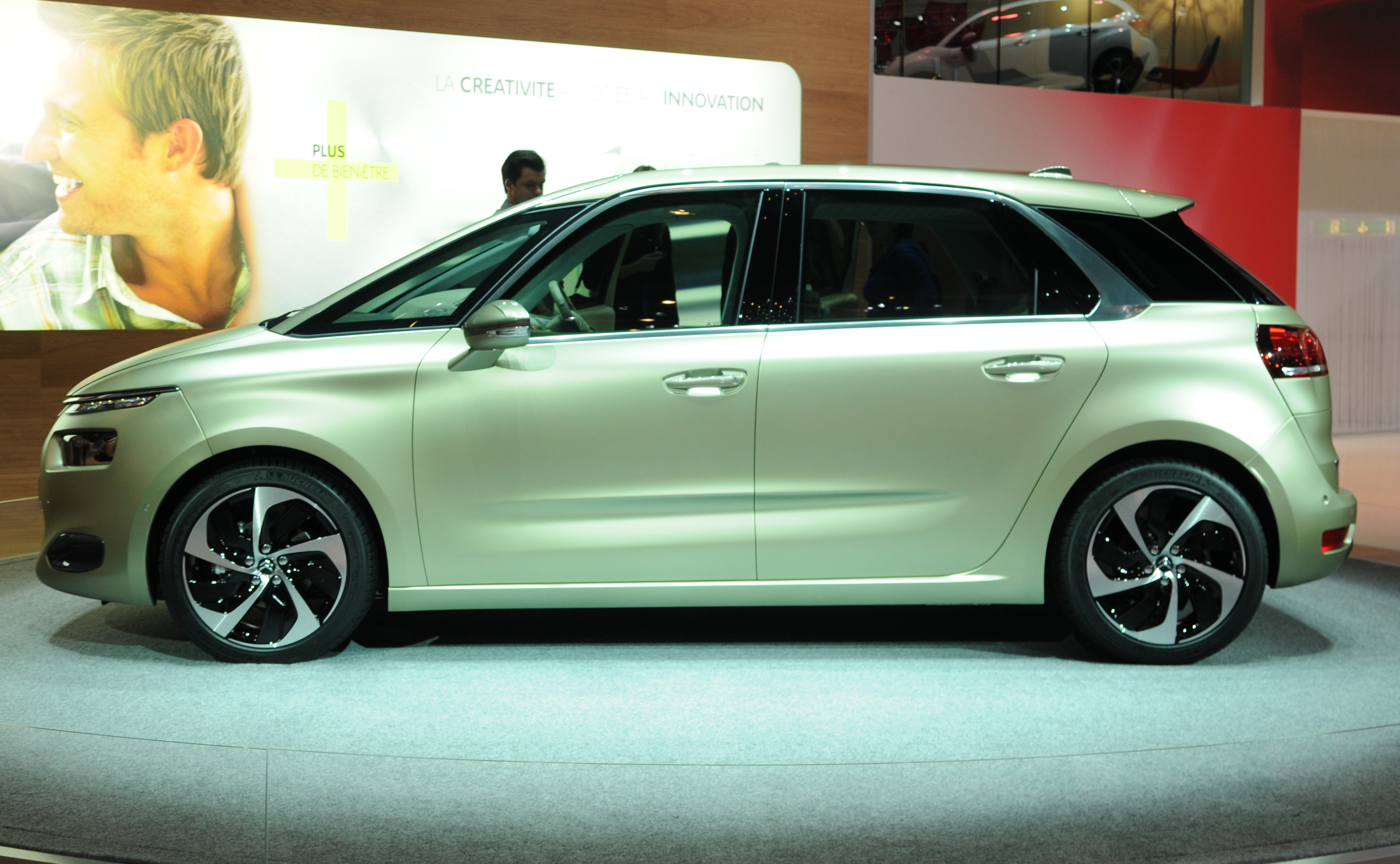
Side view

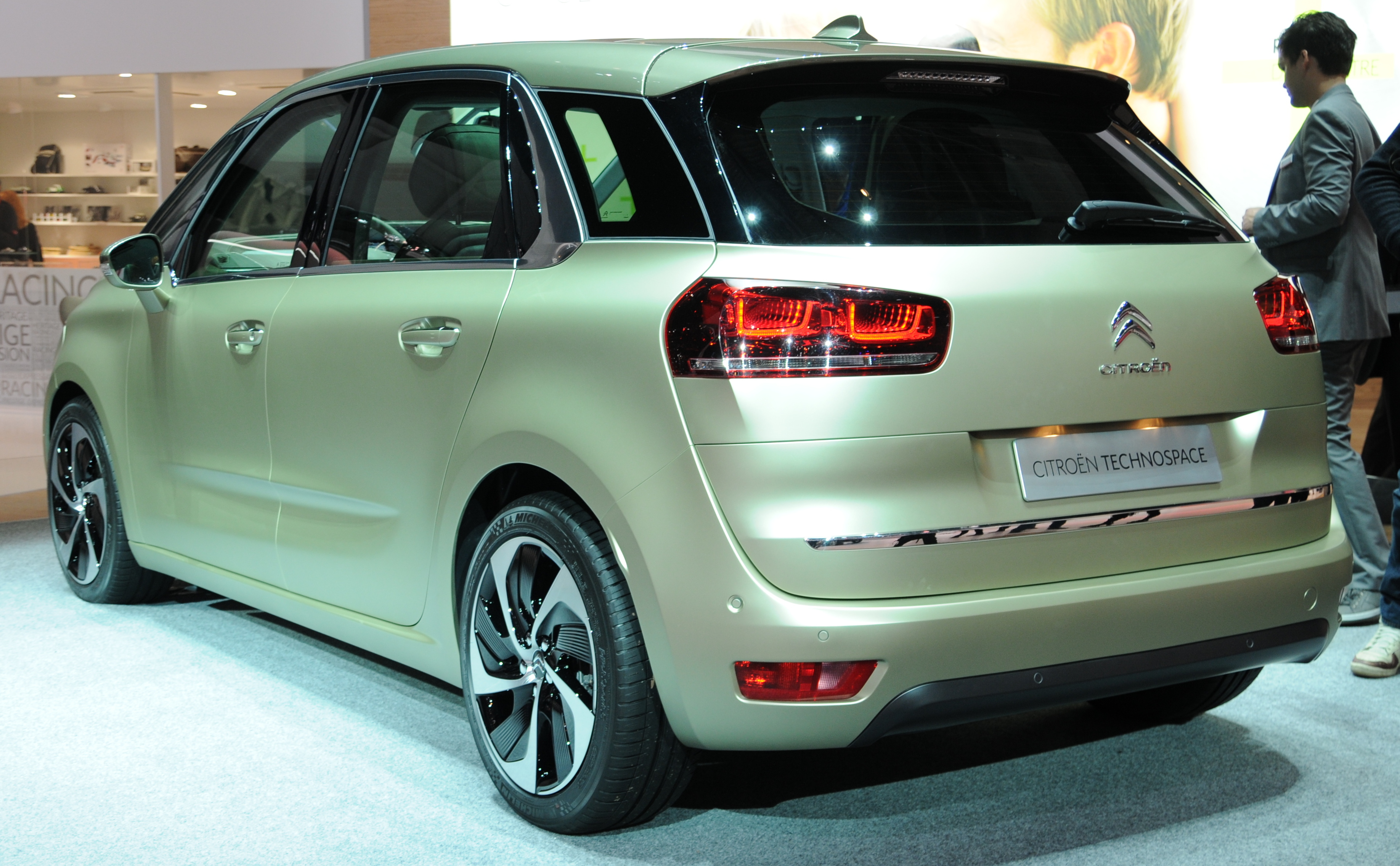
Rear 3/4 view
