= Citroën C3-XR =

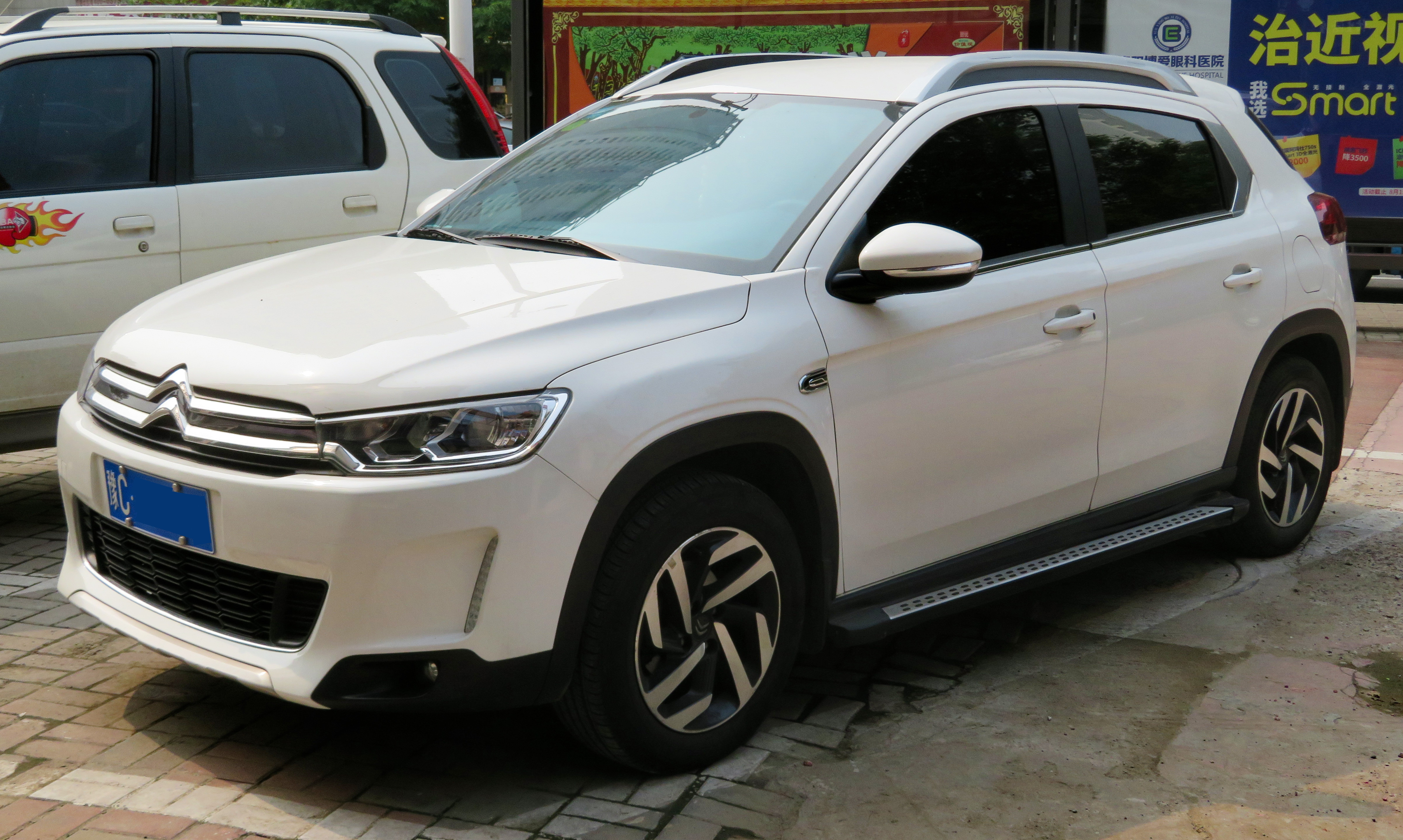

Overview
- Manufacturer: Citroën (Note: PSA Group (2014–2021) Stellantis (2021–present))
- Also called: Citroën C3L; Saipa Sialk (Iran)
- Production: C3-XR: 2014–2023, 2025–present C3L: 2020–2021
- Assembly: China: Wuhan (DPCA); Iran: Kashan (Saipa Citröen)

Body and chassis
- Class: Subcompact crossover SUV; Subcompact crossover sedan (C3L)
- Body style: 5-door SUV; 4-door sedan (C3L)
- Platform: PSA PF1 platform
- Related: Citroën C-Elysée; Peugeot 301; Citroën C3; Citroën C3 Aircross; Citroën C4 Cactus; Peugeot 2008; Peugeot 208; DS 3 Opel Crossland X IKCO Tara

Powertrain
- Engine: 1.6 L I4 (petrol); 1.6 L I4 turbo (petrol); 1.2 L I3 turbo (petrol)

Dimensions
- Wheelbase: 2,650 mm (104.3 in); 2,655 mm (104.5 in) (C3L)
- Length: 4,260 mm (167.7 in); 4,505 mm (177.4 in) (C3L)
- Width: 1,790 mm (70.5 in); 1,748 mm (68.8 in) (C3L)
- Height: 1,560 mm (61.4 in); 1,513 mm (59.6 in) (C3L)

Chronology
- Predecessor: Citroën C2

The Citroën C3-XR is a Chinese-exclusive subcompact crossover from the Franco-Chinese joint venture Dongfeng Peugeot-Citroën.

A three-box version has been marketed from 2020 to 2021 under the name Citroën C3L.

== Overview ==
Originally previewed by the concept Citroën C–XR during the 2014 Beijing Auto Show in April 2014, the C3-XR is derived from the Citroën C-Elysée. Citroën debuted the C3-XR on the 2014 Paris Auto Show, and released the production version in China on the 2014 Guangzhou Auto Show in November 2014.

The actual production version of the Citroën C3–XR was launched on the China car market on December 21, 2014. A special anniversary edition package for the Citroën C3–XR was available, when the joint venture of Dongfeng PSA celebrates its twenty fifth anniversary in 2017.

The special edition was sold as a package exclusively for the 134 hp (100 kW; 136 PS) 1.2 liter turbo version released in 2016. The package comes in two trim levels, including the glitter and gold trim.

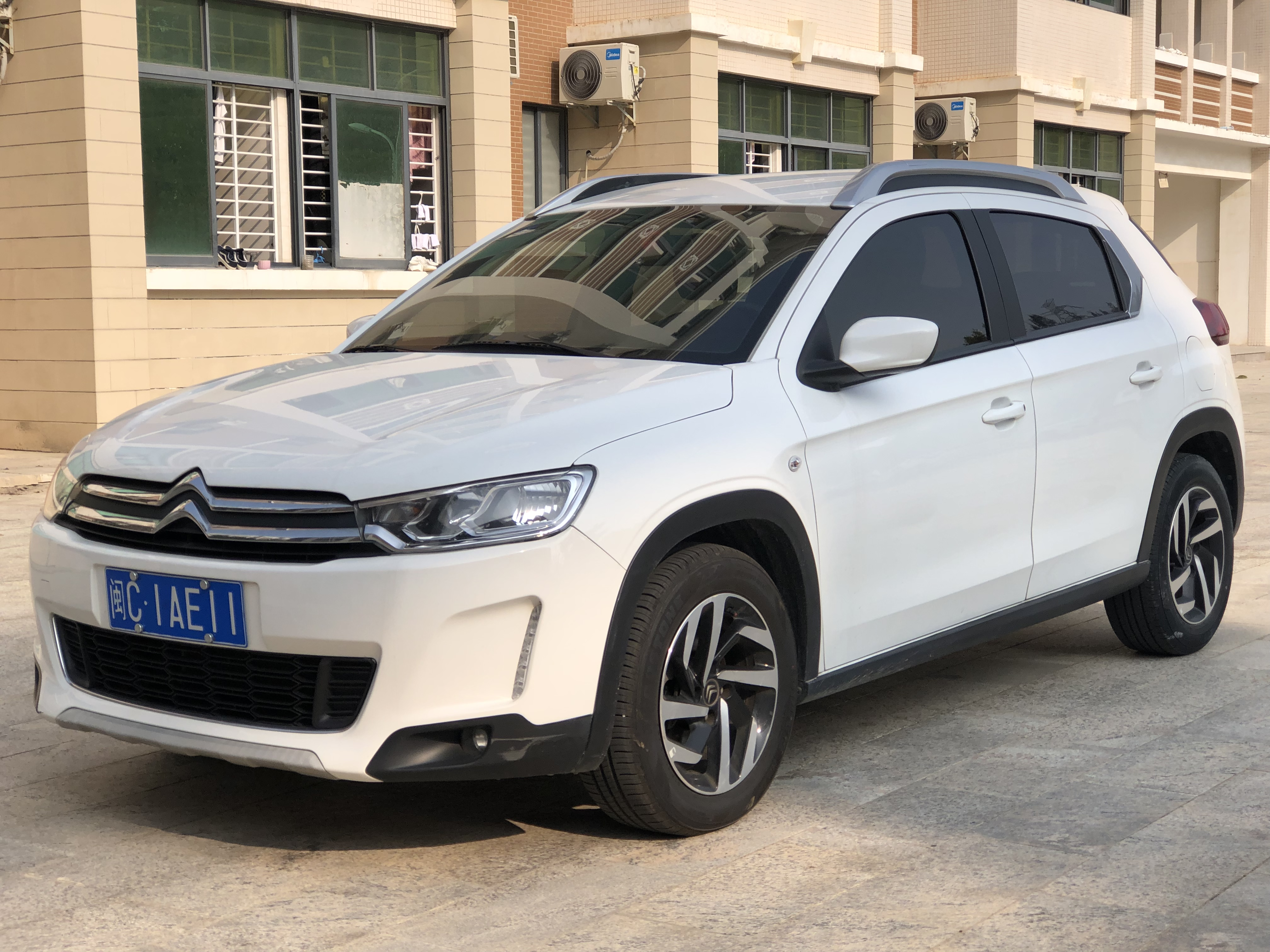
Citroën C3–XR (pre-facelift)

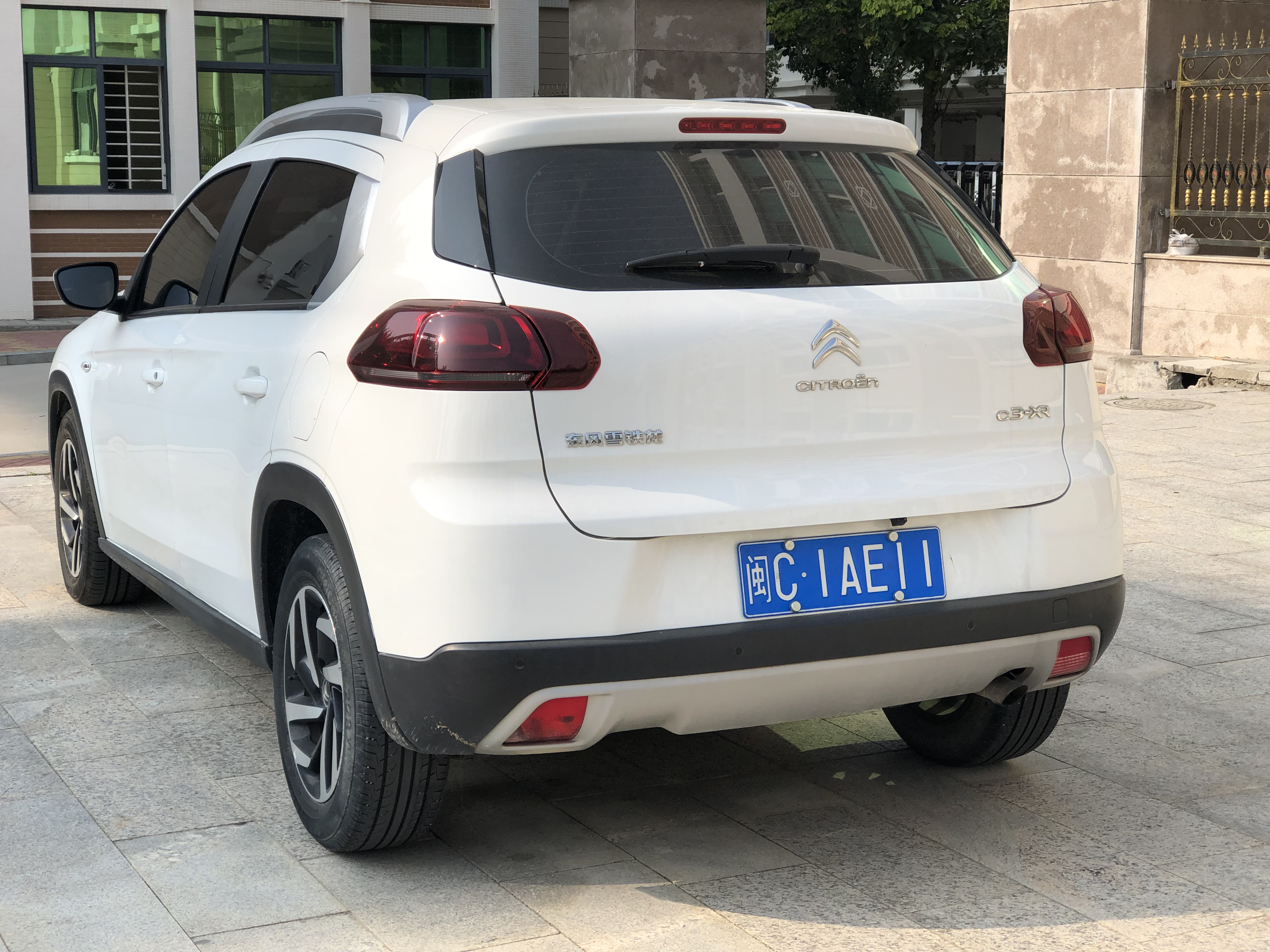
Citroën C3–XR (pre-facelift)

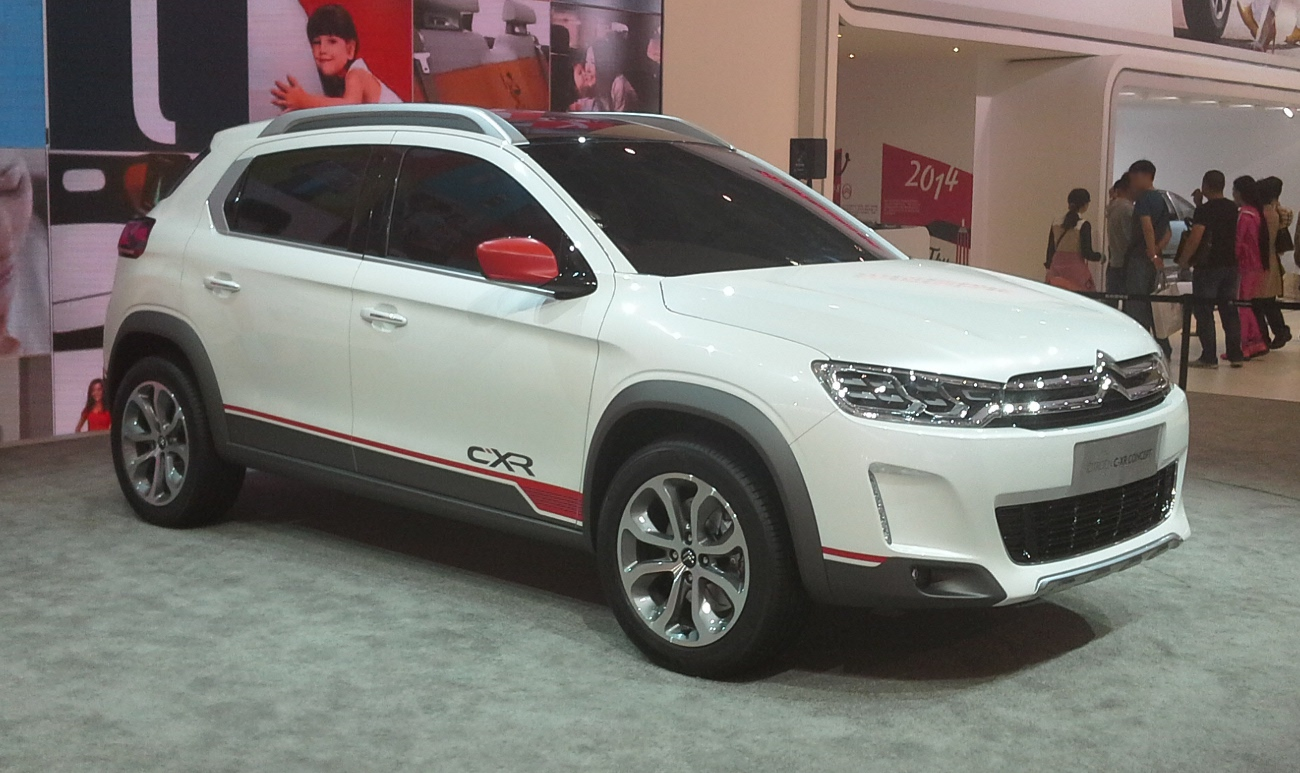
Citroën C–XR Concept

=== Engines ===
During the initial release, available engines for the Citroën C3–XR are a 117 hp (87 kW; 119 PS) 1.6-liter engine and a 167 hp (125 kW; 169 PS) 1.6-liter turbo engine.

An additional engine option was added for the Citroen C3–XR in 2016. The added engine was a 1.2-litre turbocharged four cylinder petrol engine with an output of 134 hp (100 kW; 136 PS) and 230 N⋅m (170 lb⋅ft), and was mated to a six speed automatic gearbox. The updated model was released to the car market in China in March 2016.

== 2019 facelift ==
The C3–XR received a facelift in 2019, featuring a restyled front fascia. The facelift was revealed on January 16, 2019, and was available in the market by March 2019. Engine options include a 1.6-litre engine, producing 117 hp (87 kW; 119 PS), and a 1.2-litre turbo engine, producing 134 hp (100 kW; 136 PS), both mated to either a five speed manual gearbox, and one six speed semi automatic gearbox.

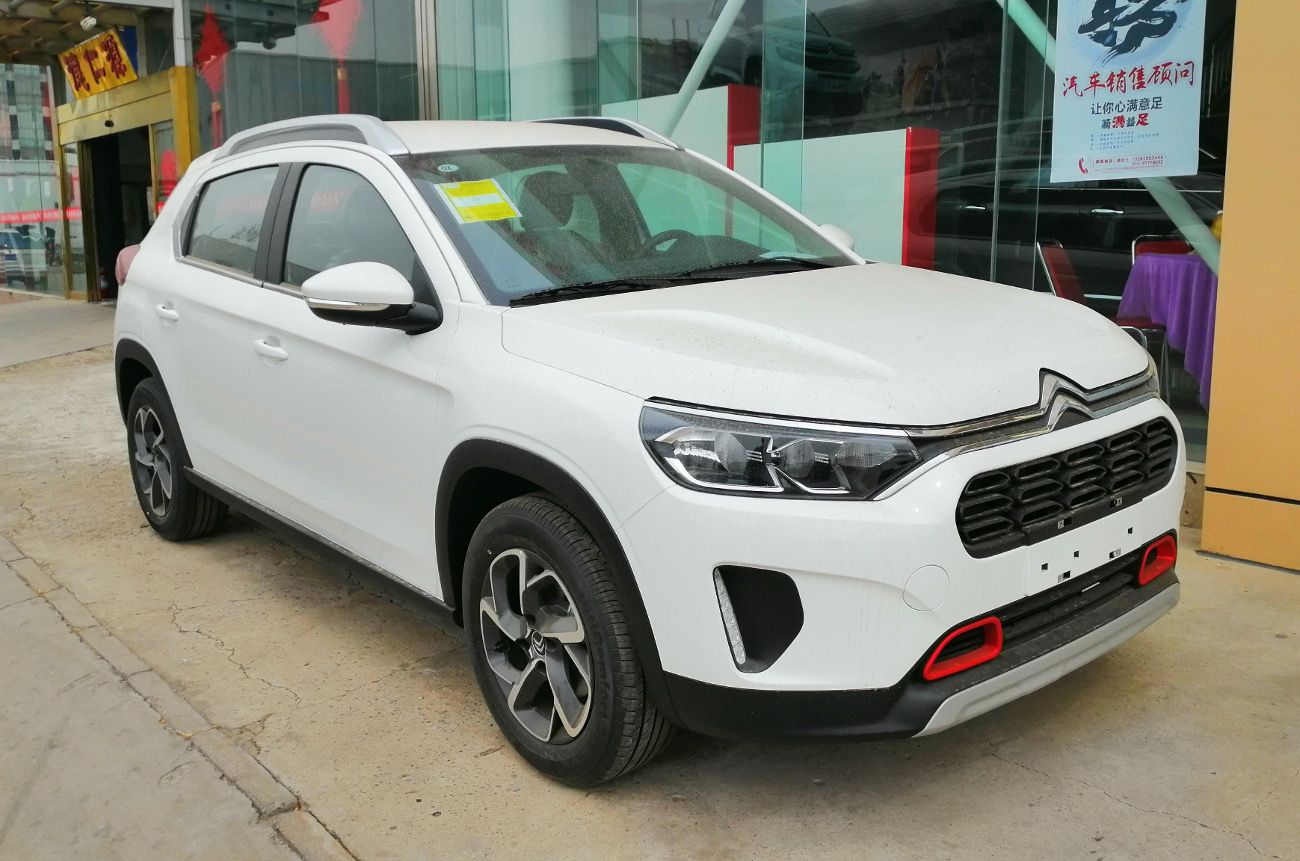
2019 Citroën C3–XR (first facelift)

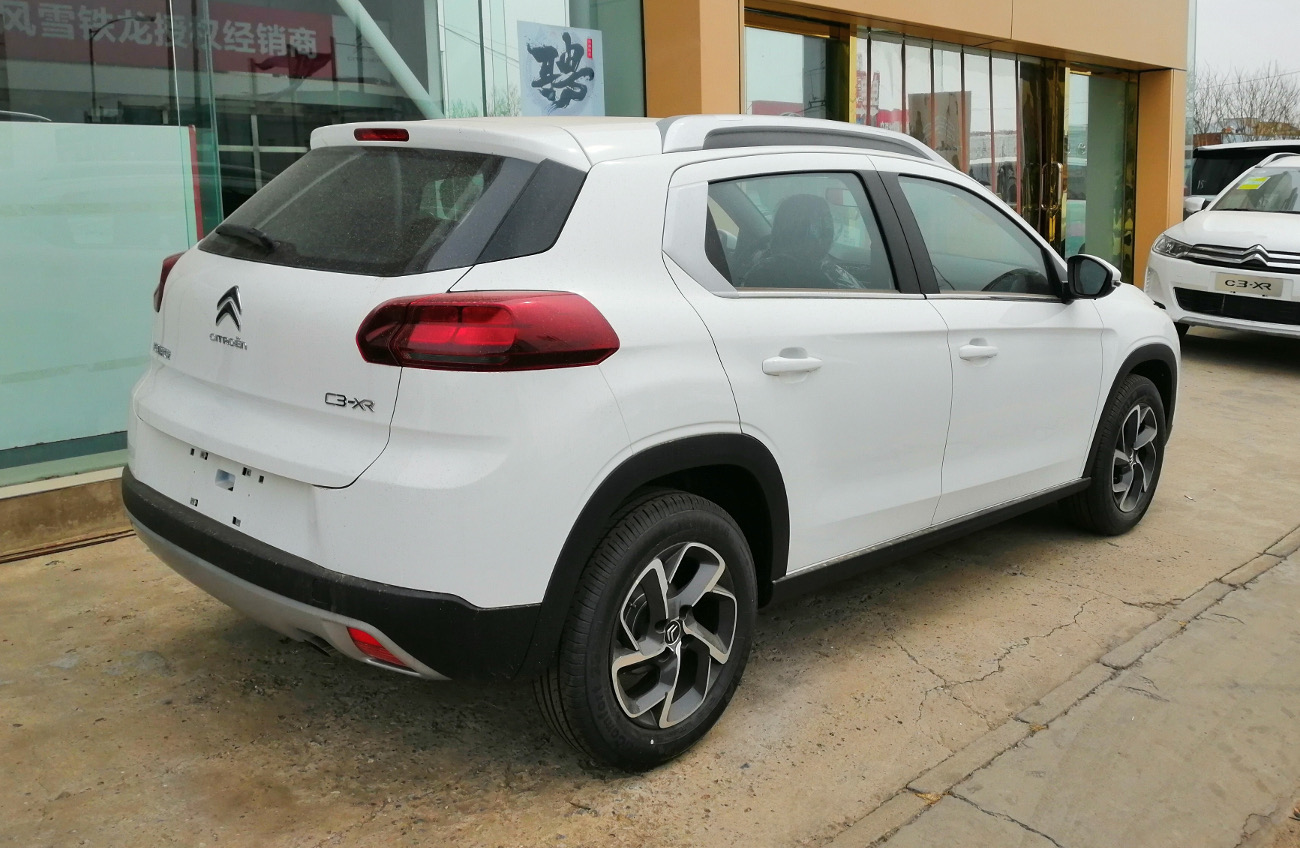
2019 Citroën C3–XR (first facelift)

This facelift failed to stop quickly decreasing sales volumes.

== 2021 facelift ==
The C3-XR got a second facelift in May 2021. The front of the vehicle was heavily updated, evoking the recent facelift of the C3 Aircross. The C3-XR also got a more modern interior. It has been on sale from July 2021.

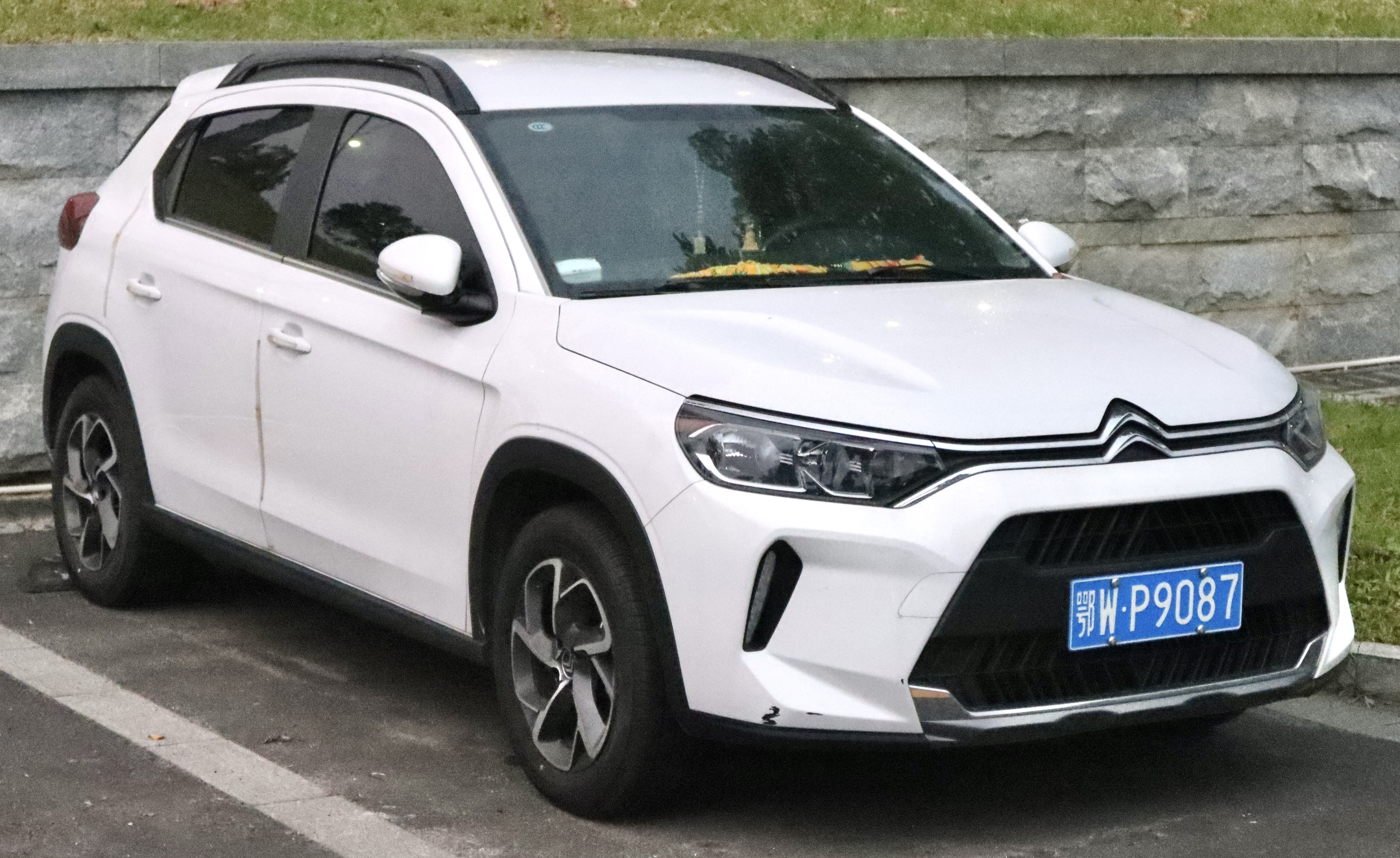
2021 Citroën C3–XR (second facelift)

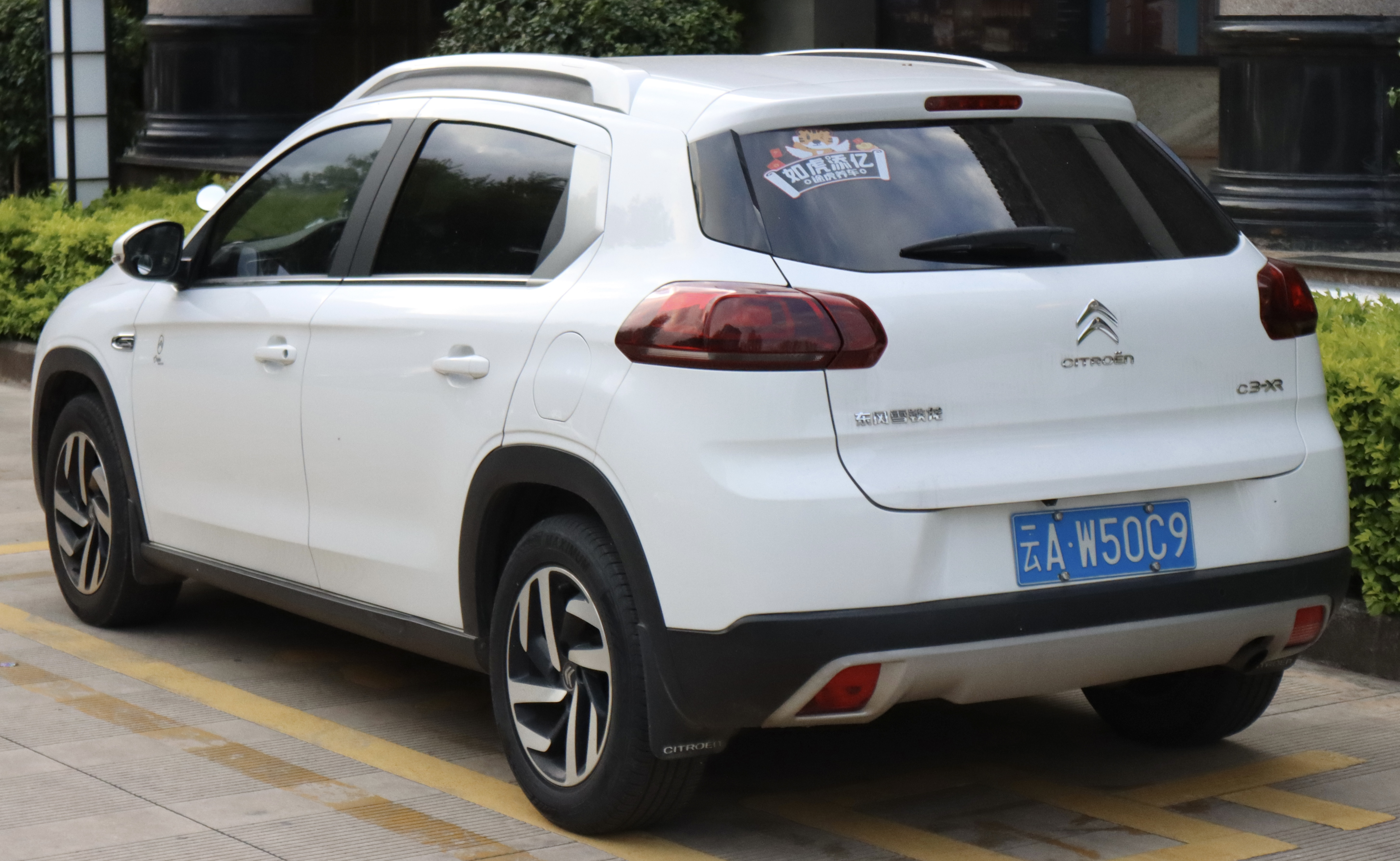
2021 Citroën C3–XR (second facelift)

== Citroën C3L (M443) ==
In 2020, a 4-door crossover sedan version was released, called the C3L whose design is similar in concept to the Volvo S60 Cross Country. The C3L is produced only for Chinese market at the Wuhan plant. The design incorporates numerous elements from the C3-XR, another vehicle derived from the C-Elysee. The suspension is raised and the bodywork has plastic protections in the bumpers and along the side. The Citroën C3L is 4,505 mm long, 1,748 mm wide, 1,513 mm tall with a 2,655 mm long wheelbase. The engine is a 1.2-liter VTi three-cylinder producing 114 hp (85 kW; 116 PS) and 190 N⋅m (140 lb⋅ft) of torque and mated to a six-speed Aisin automatic transmission.

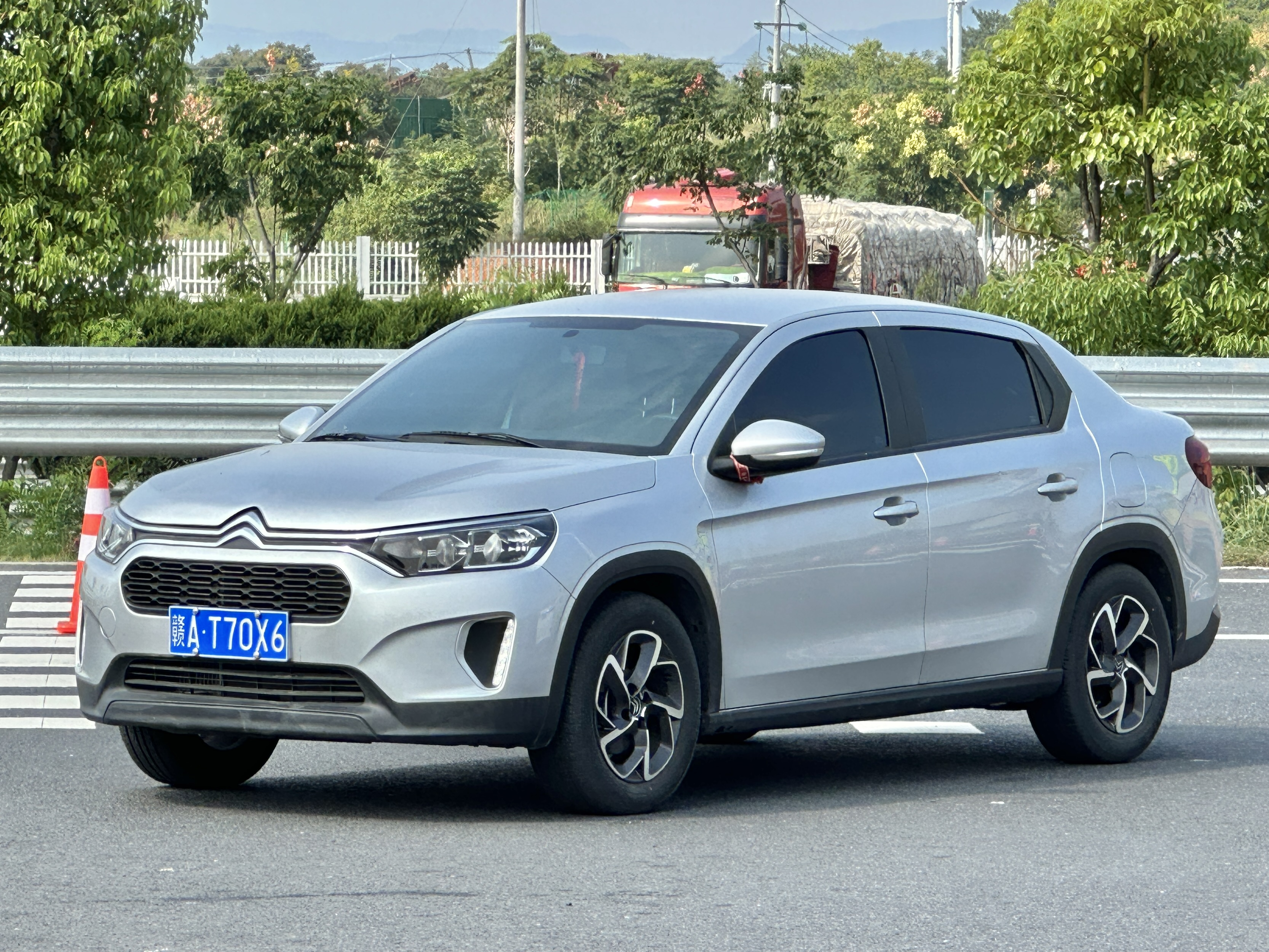
Citroen C3L (front)

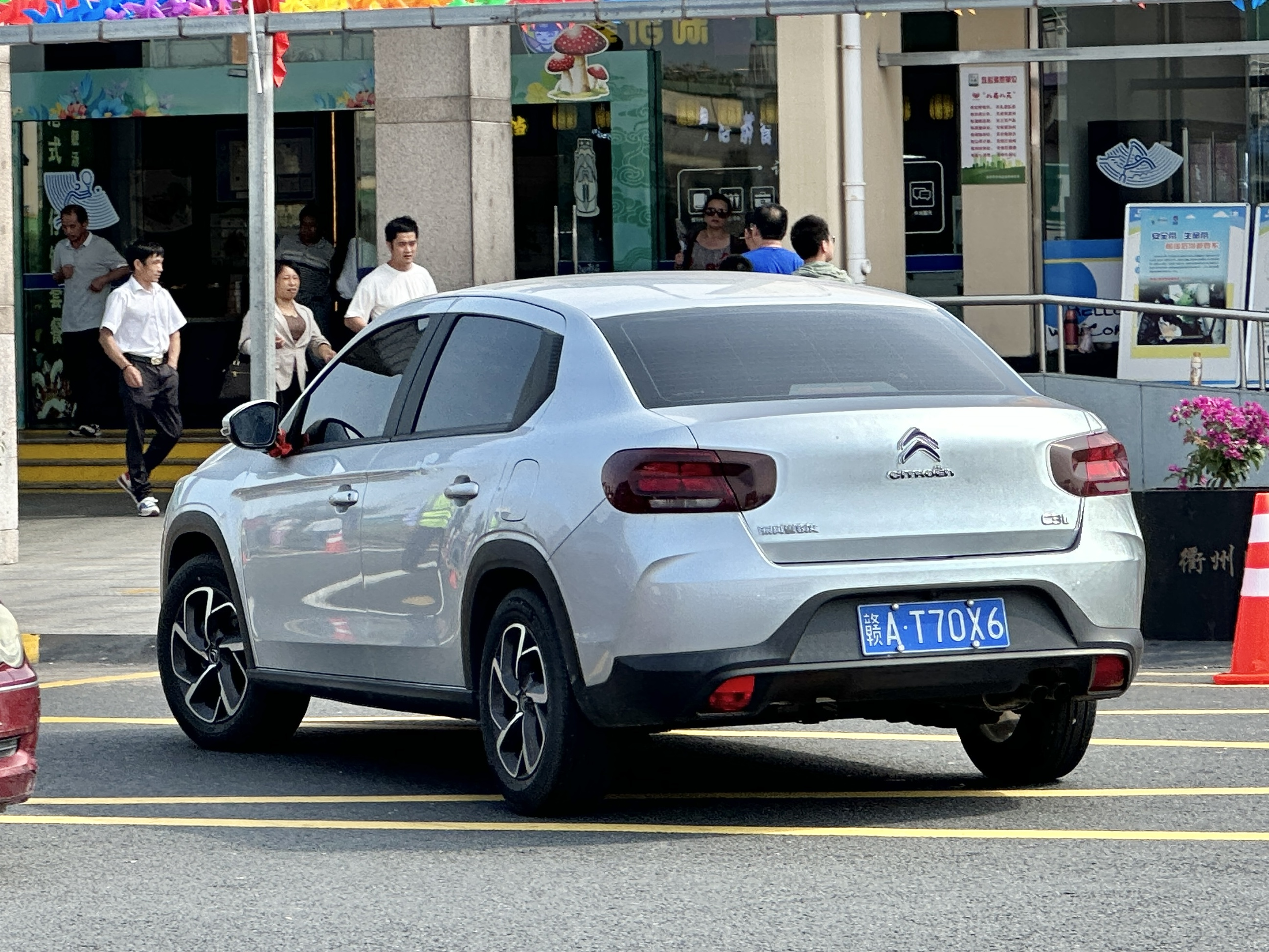
Citroen C3L (rear)

== Sales ==
Year	China	
Year	C3-XR	C3L
2023	9,181	5
2024	1	—
