= PSA PF1 platform =

Overview
- Manufacturer: Stellantis
- Production: 1998–present

Body and chassis
- Class: Subcompact car Entry-level compact car
- Layout: Front-engine, front-wheel-drive

Chronology
- Successor: PSA EMP1 platform

PSA PF1 platform is a global subcompact platform used by the multinational automotive group Stellantis.

Larger PSA models used the PF2 and PF3 platforms.

== Models ==
Vehicles based on the PF1 platform:

- 1998–2013 Peugeot 206/206+, essentially a combination of the 106/Saxo/AX and the PF1 platform
- 2002–2009 Citroën C3 I
- 2003–2012 Citroën C3 Pluriel
- 2003–2009 Citroën C2
- 2005–2009 Peugeot 1007
- 2006–2014 Peugeot 207
- 2009–2021 Citroën C3 II
- 2009–2017 Citroën C3 Picasso
- 2010–present IKCO Runna, essentially a combination of the 106/Saxo and the PF1 platform
- 2010–2021 Citroën C3 Aircross/C3 Picasso/Aircross (Latin America)
- 2010–2016 Citroën DS3
- 2016–2019 DS 3
- 2012–2020 Peugeot 208
- 2013–2019 Peugeot 2008
- 2012–present Peugeot 301
- 2012–2022 Citroën C-Elysée/Dongfeng Junfeng EV30/Dongfeng Fukang e-Elysée
- 2014–2020 Citroën C4 Cactus
- 2014–2023 Citroën C3-XR/C3L
- 2016–2024 Citroën C3 III - platform renamed to 'Platform A' for media coverage
- 2017–2024 Opel/Vauxhall Crossland X/Crossland
- 2017–2024 Citroën C3 Aircross
- 2021–present IKCO Tara
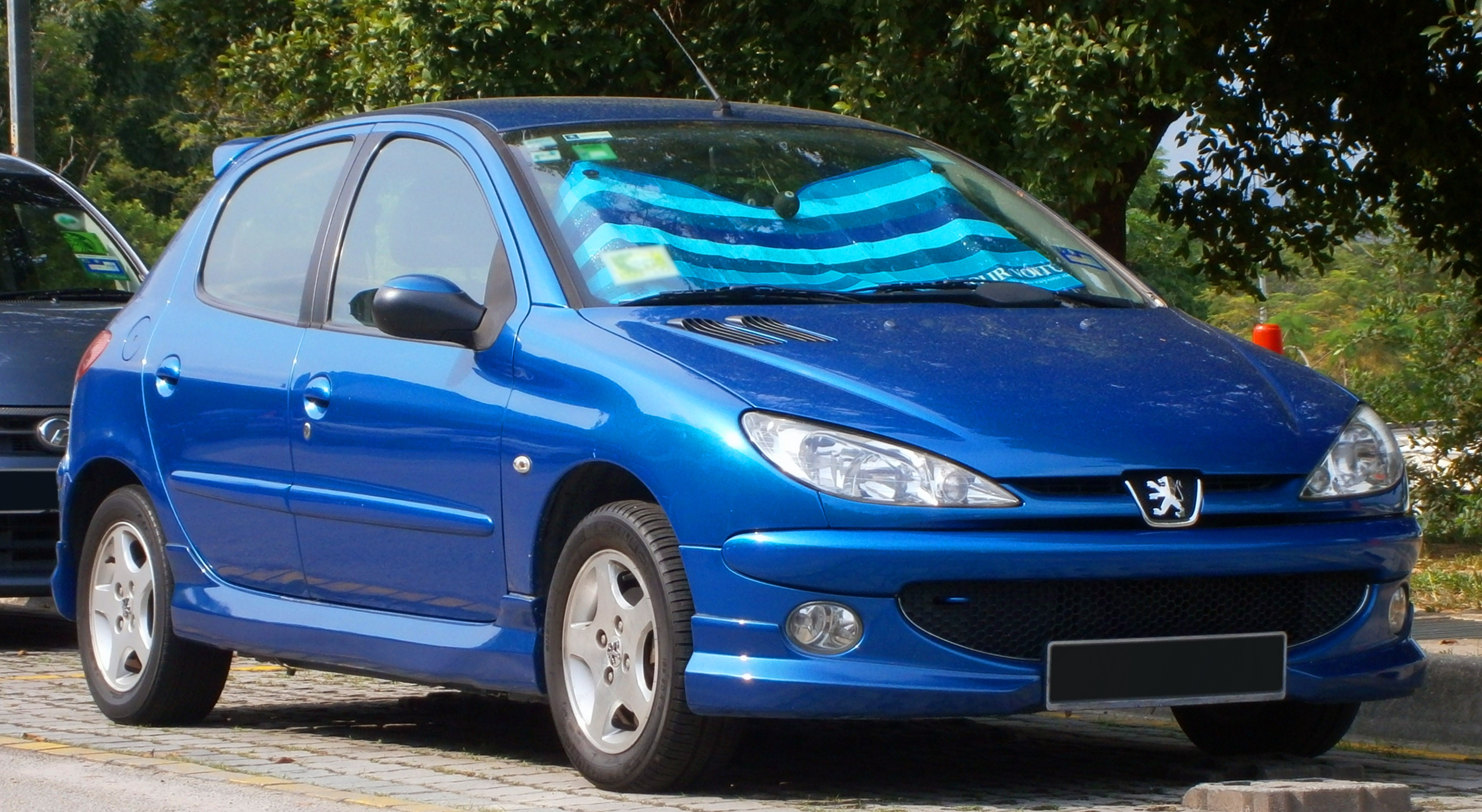
Peugeot 206/206+

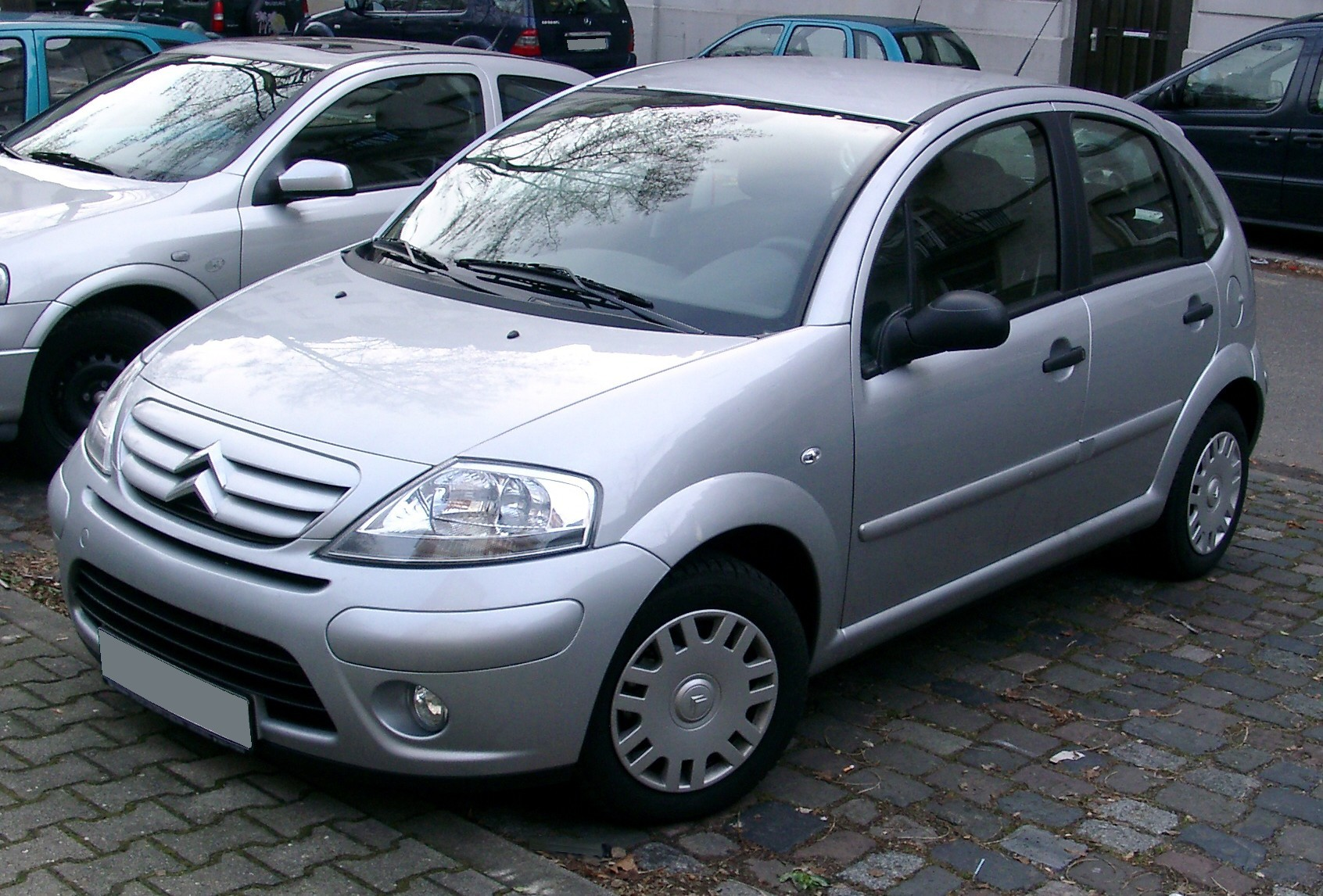
Citroën C3

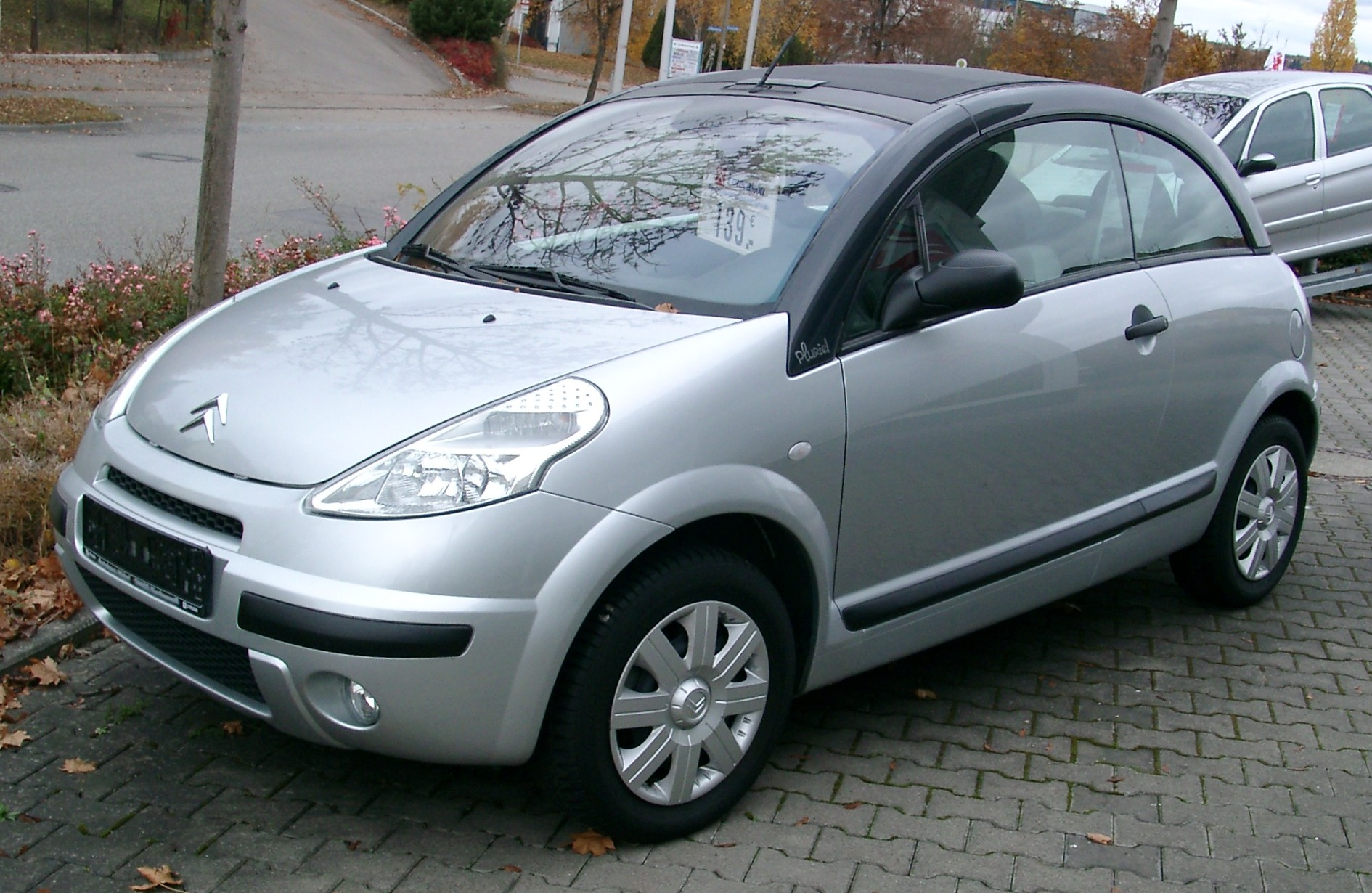
Citroën C3 Pluriel

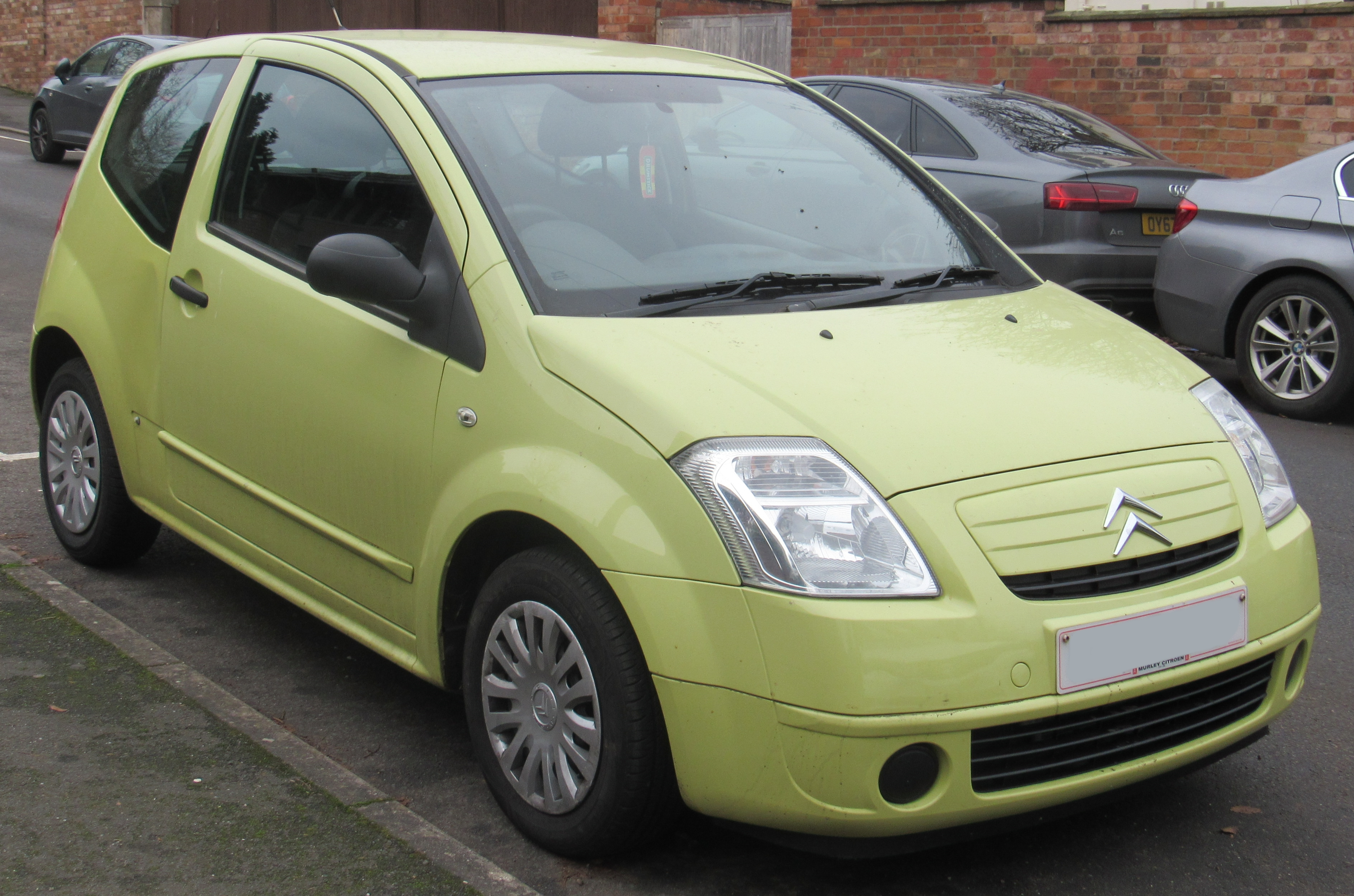
Citroën C2

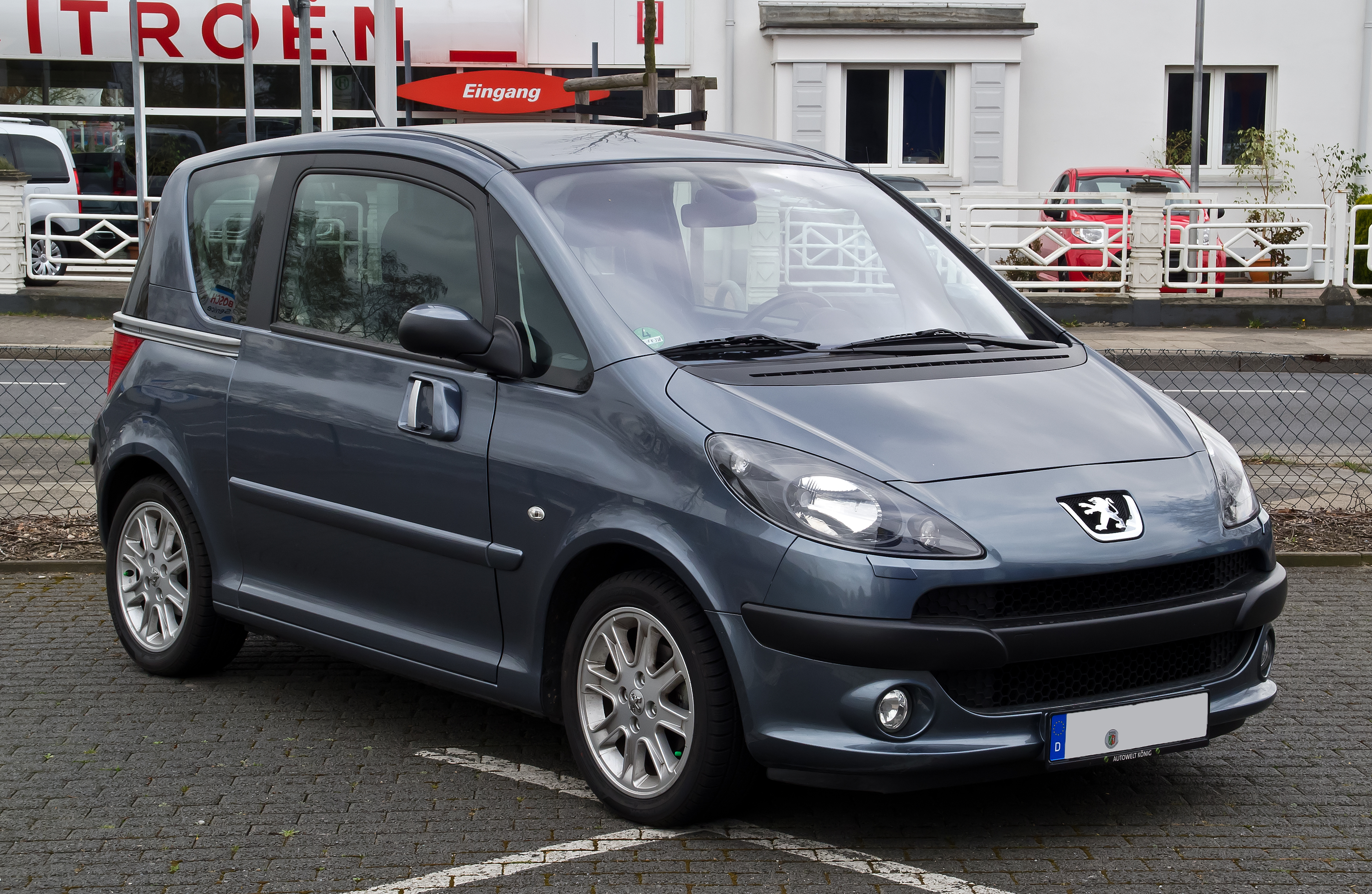
Peugeot 1007

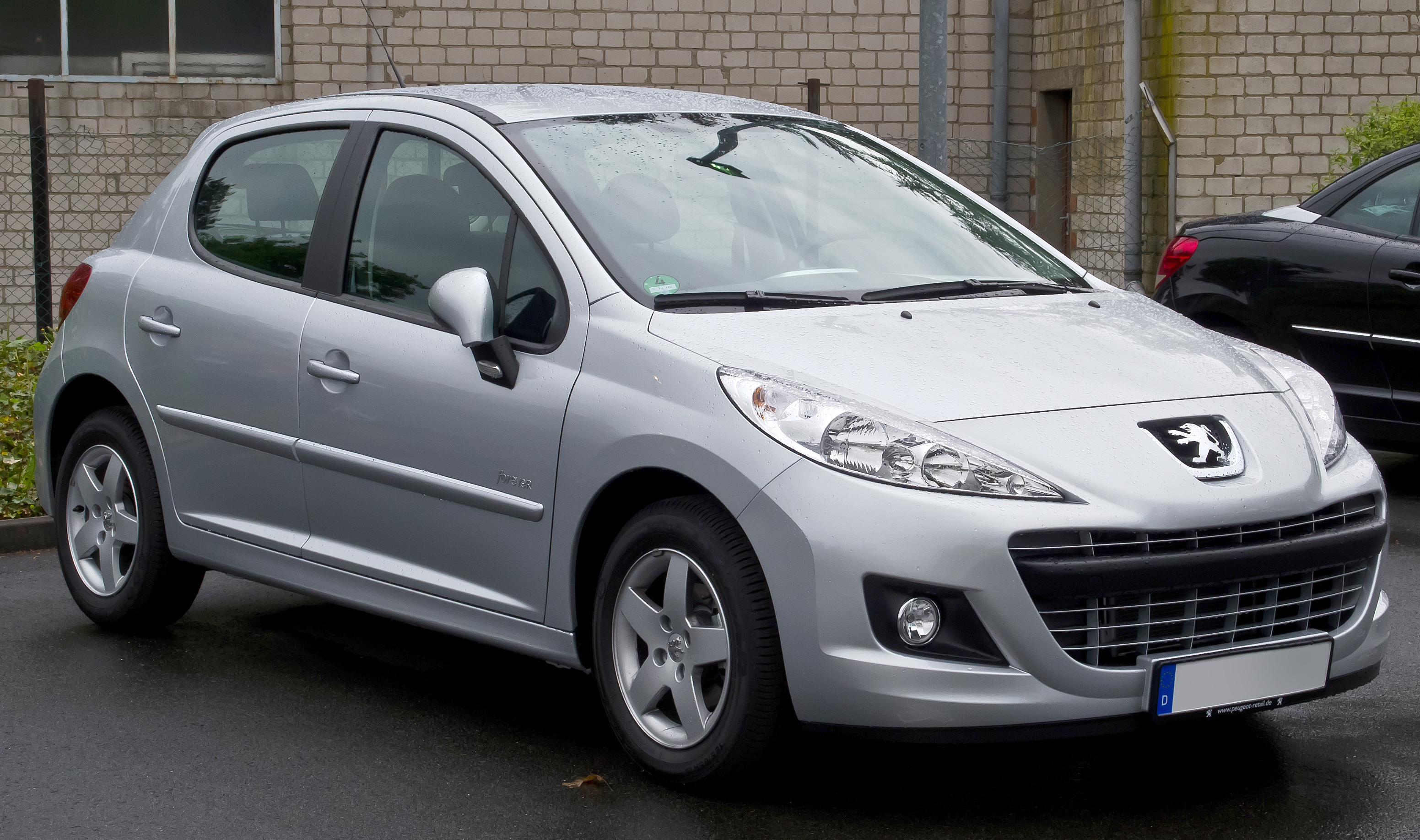
Peugeot 207

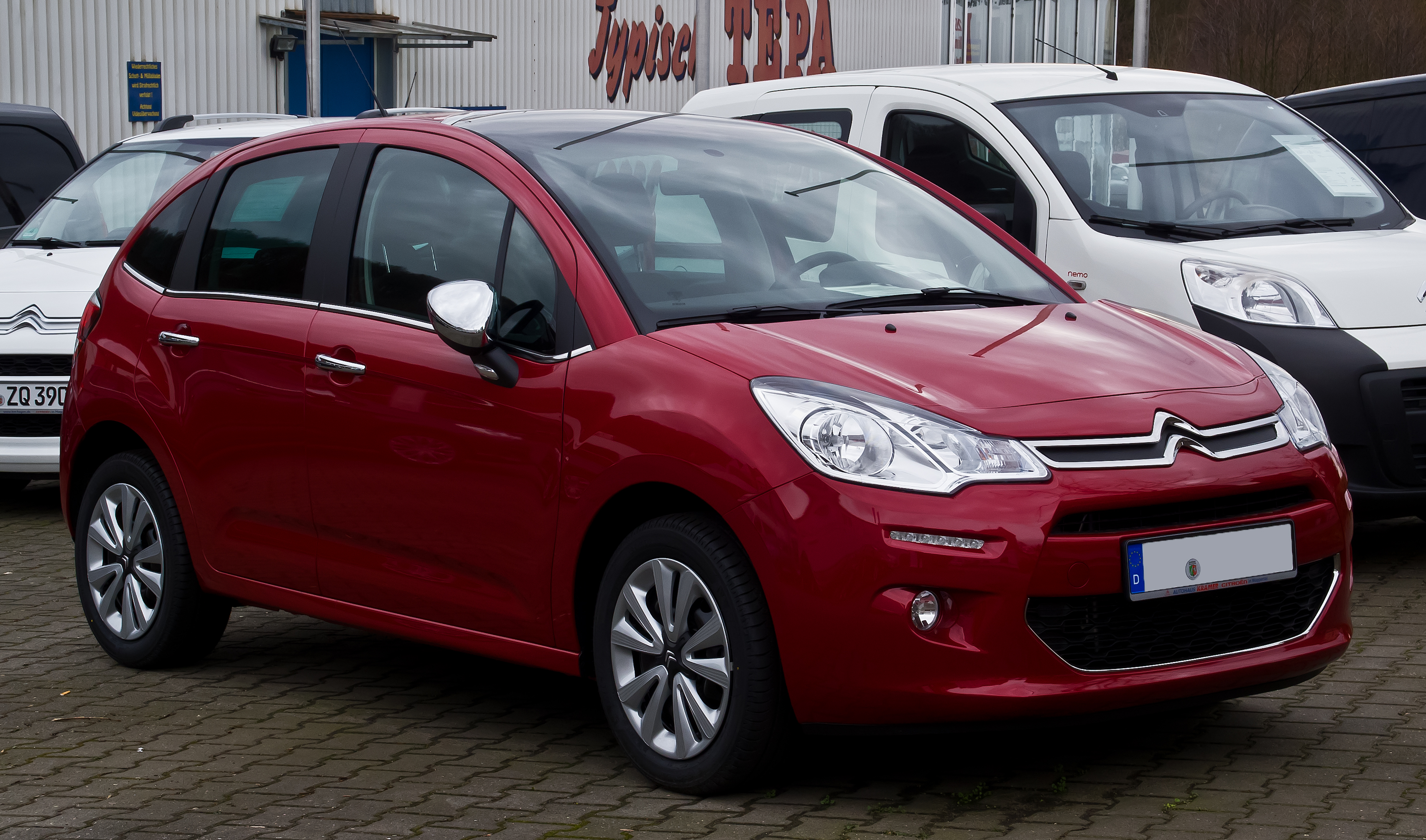
Citroën C3 II

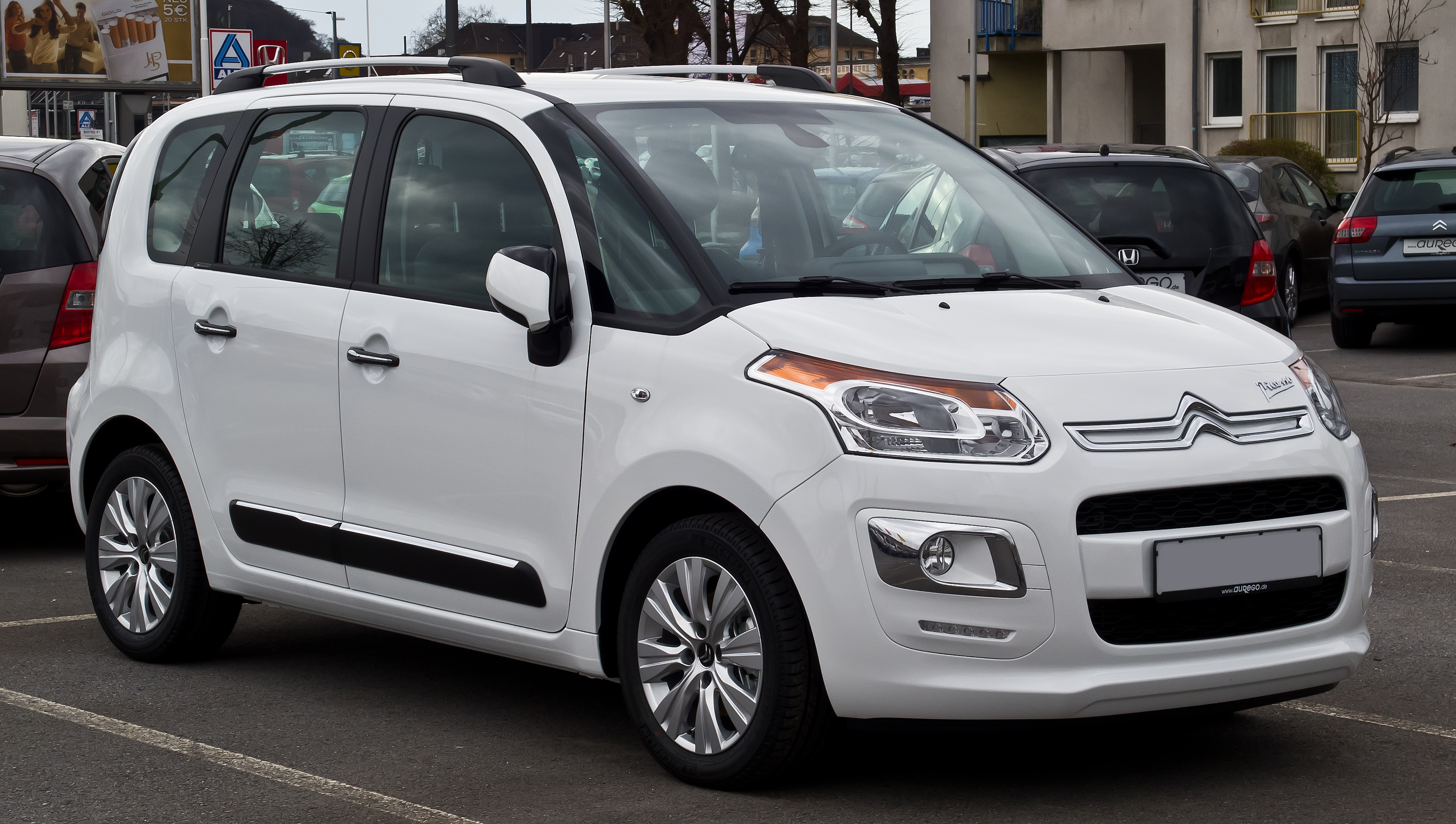
Citroën C3 Picasso

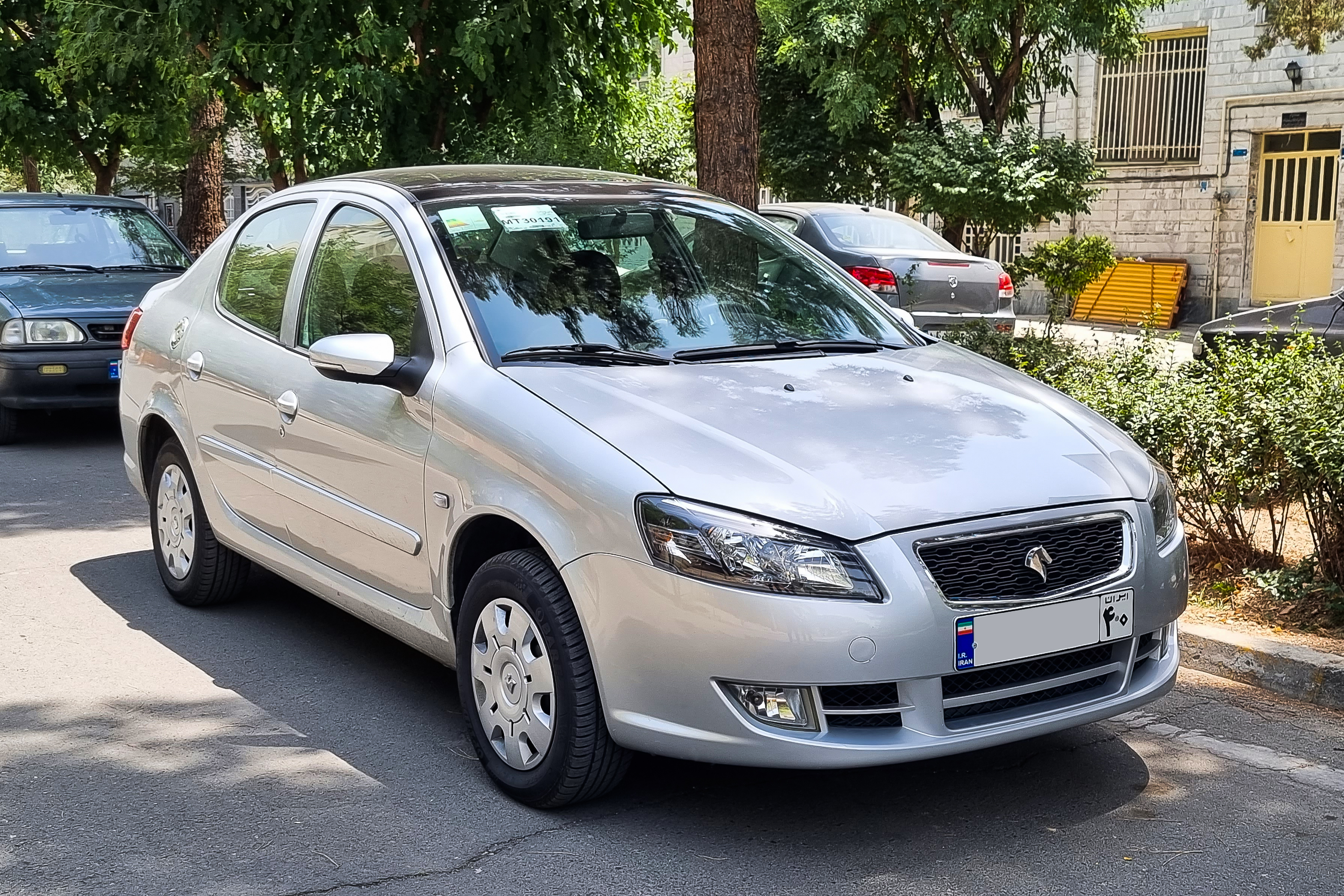
IKCO Runna

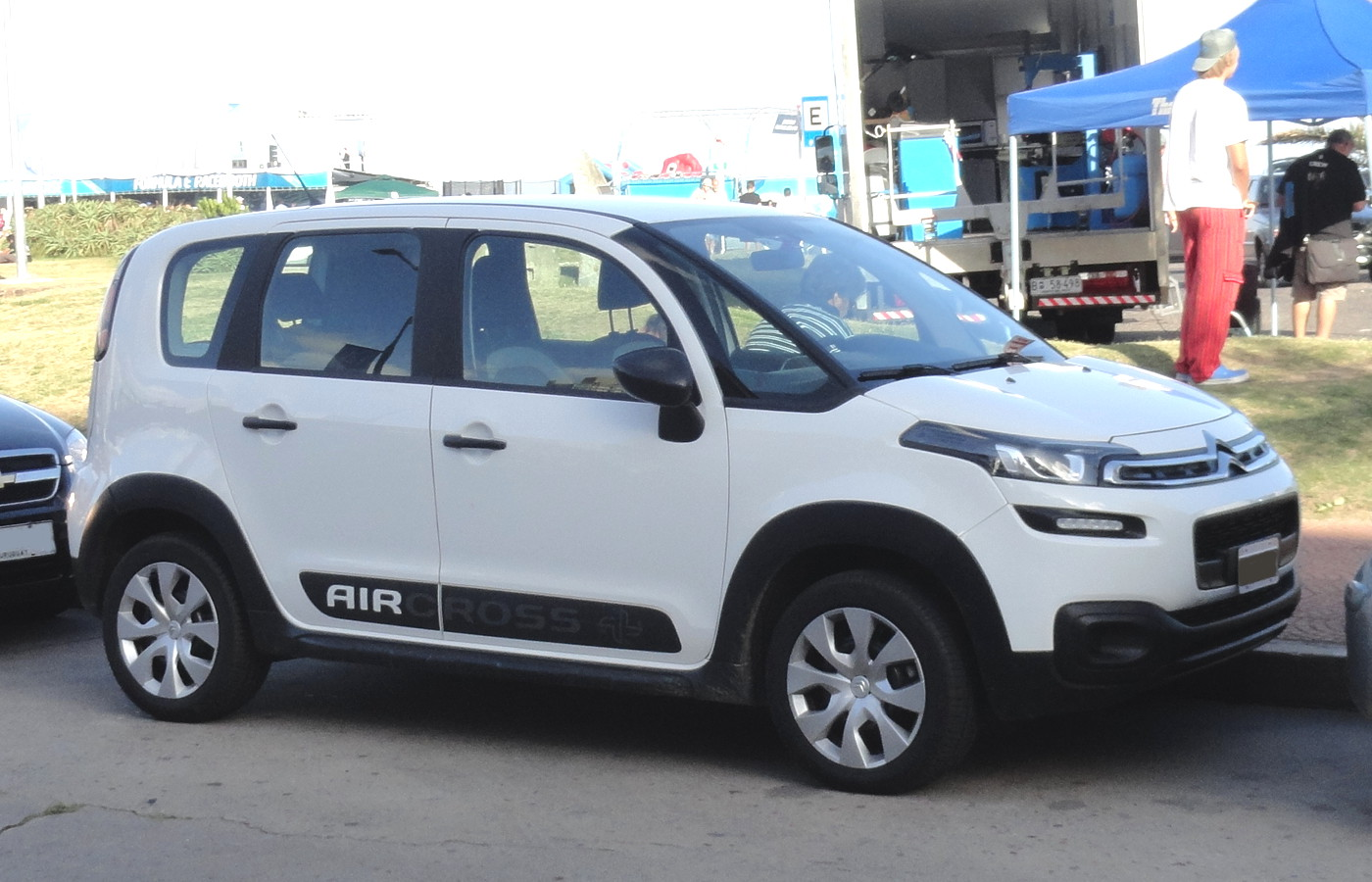
Citroën C3 Aircross/C3 Picasso/Aircross

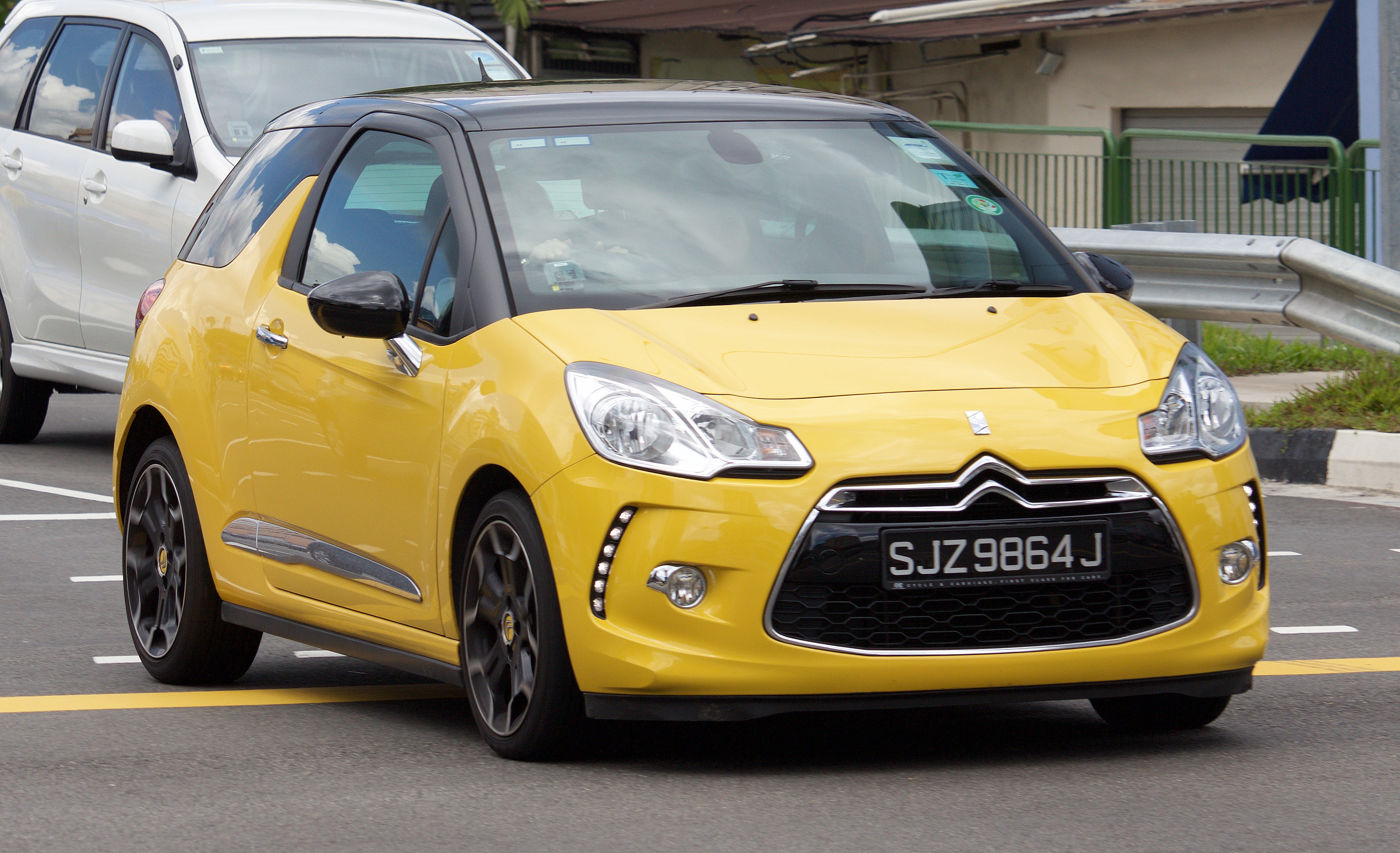
Citroën DS3

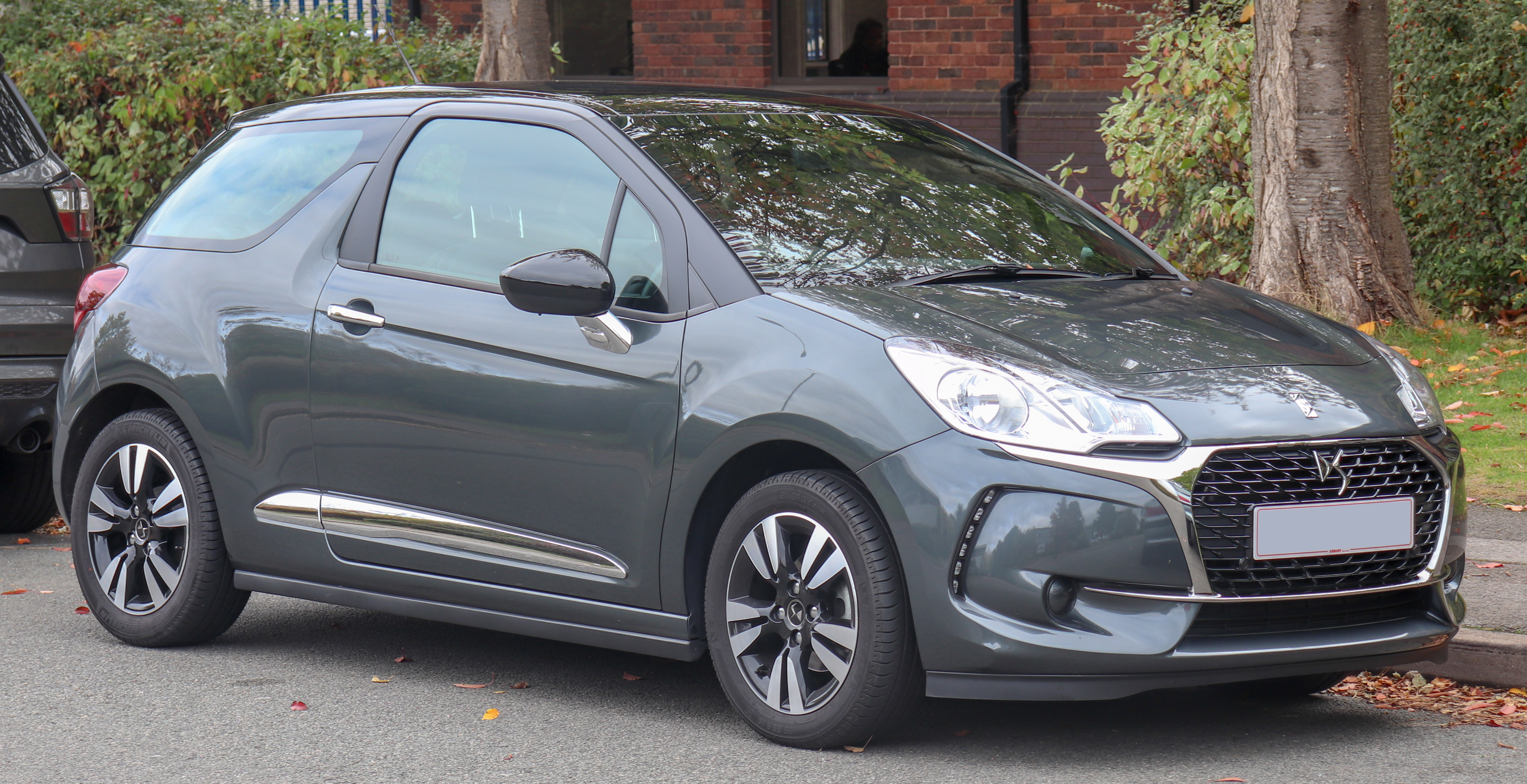
DS 3

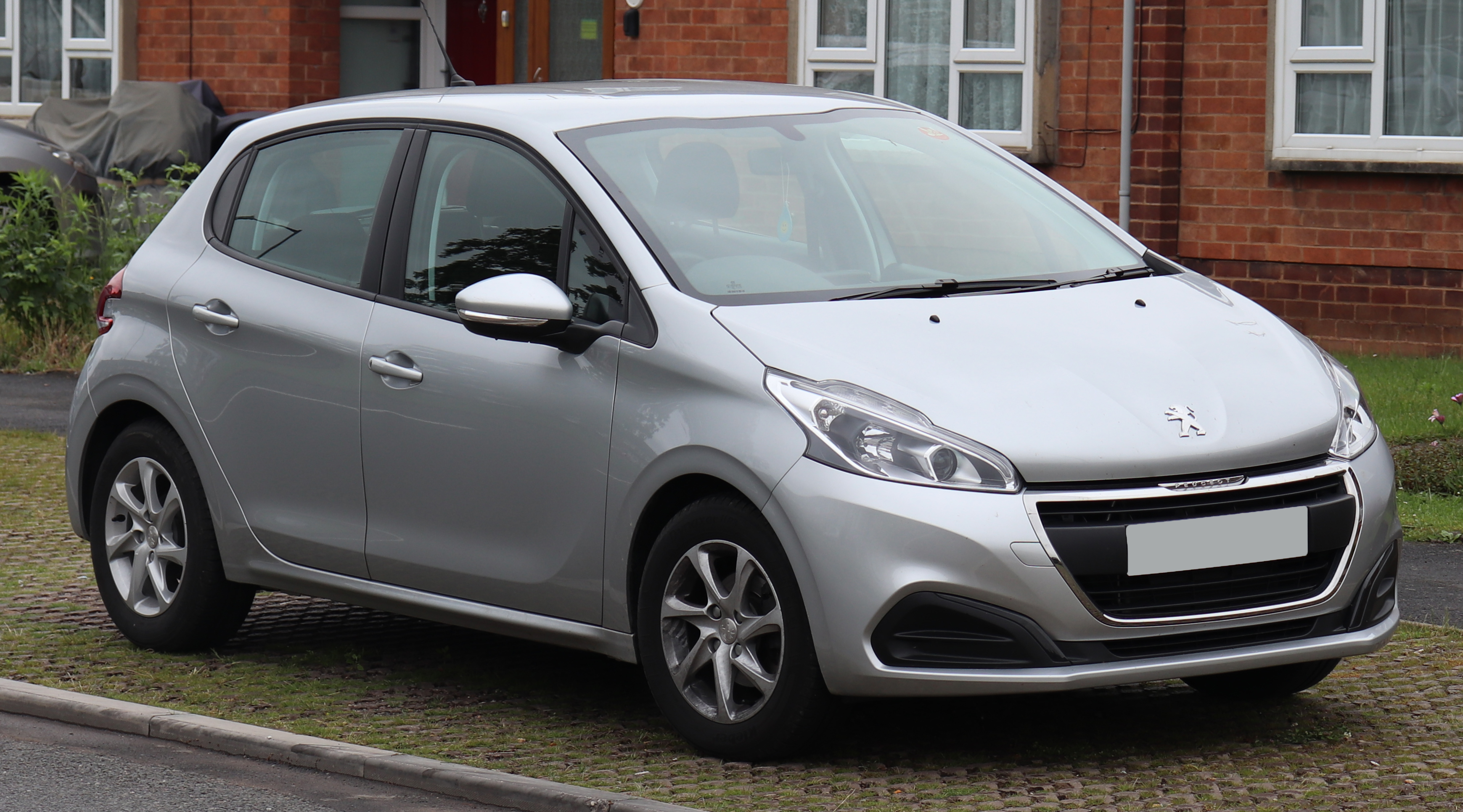
Peugeot 208

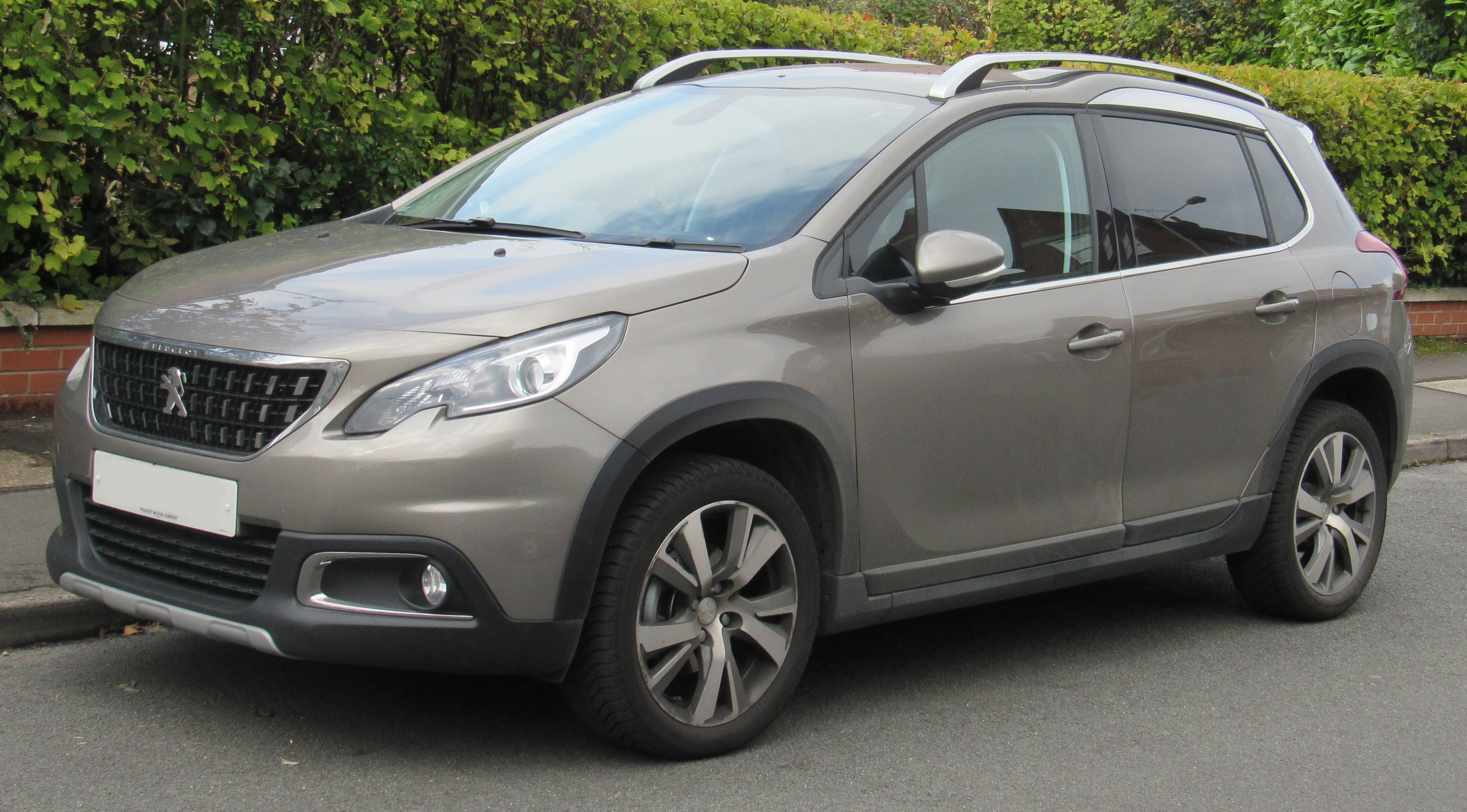
Peugeot 2008

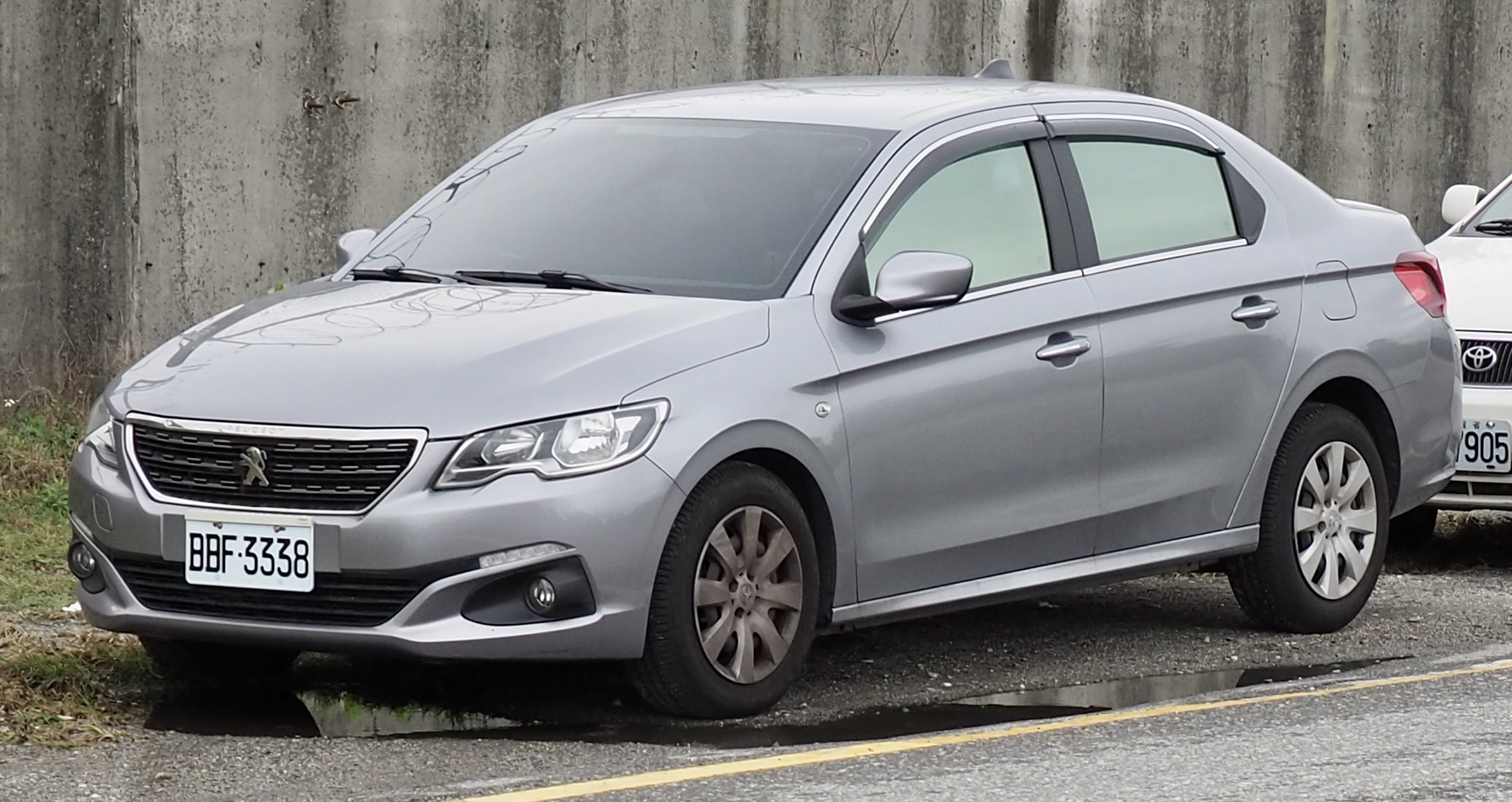
Peugeot 301

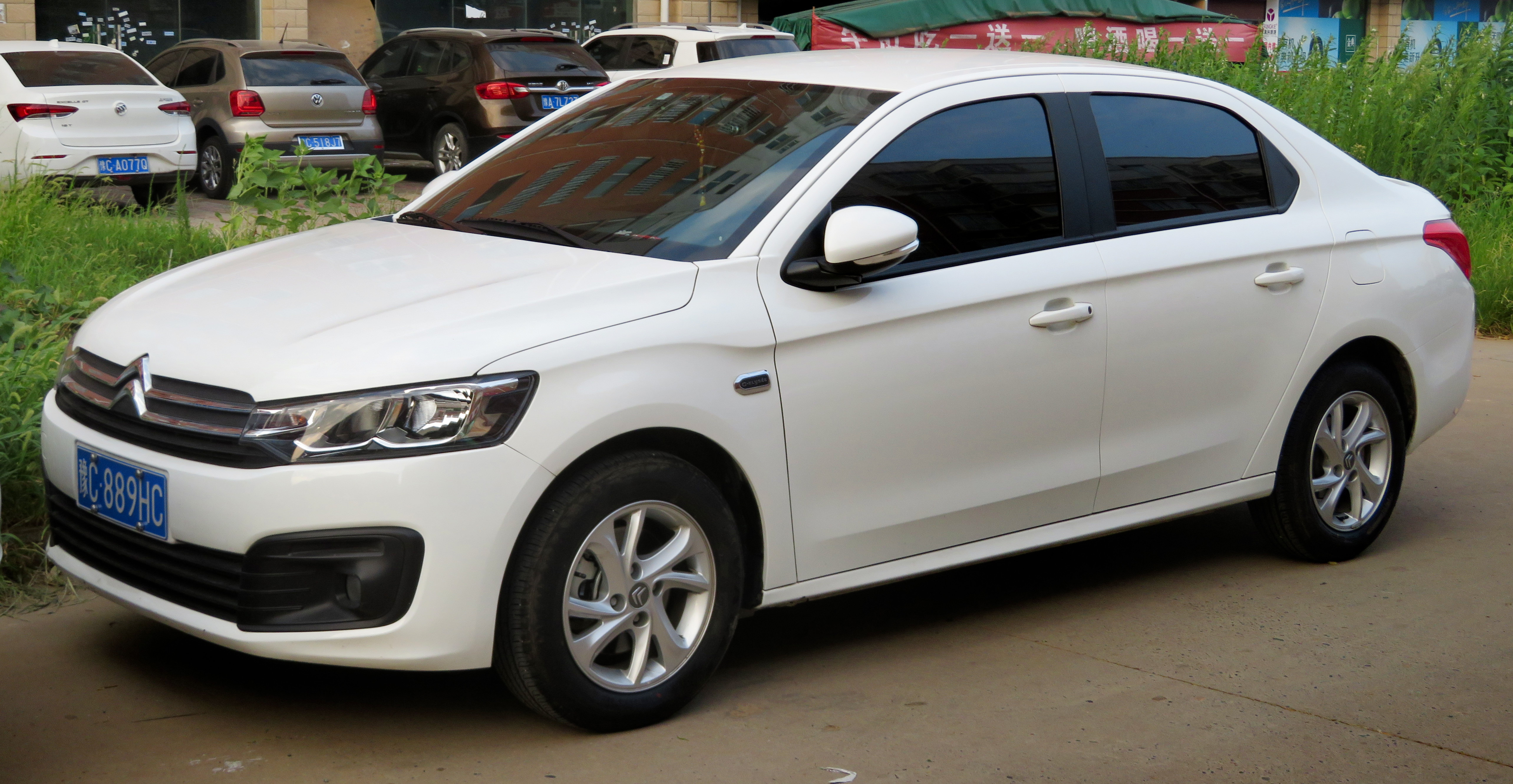
Citroën C-Elysée

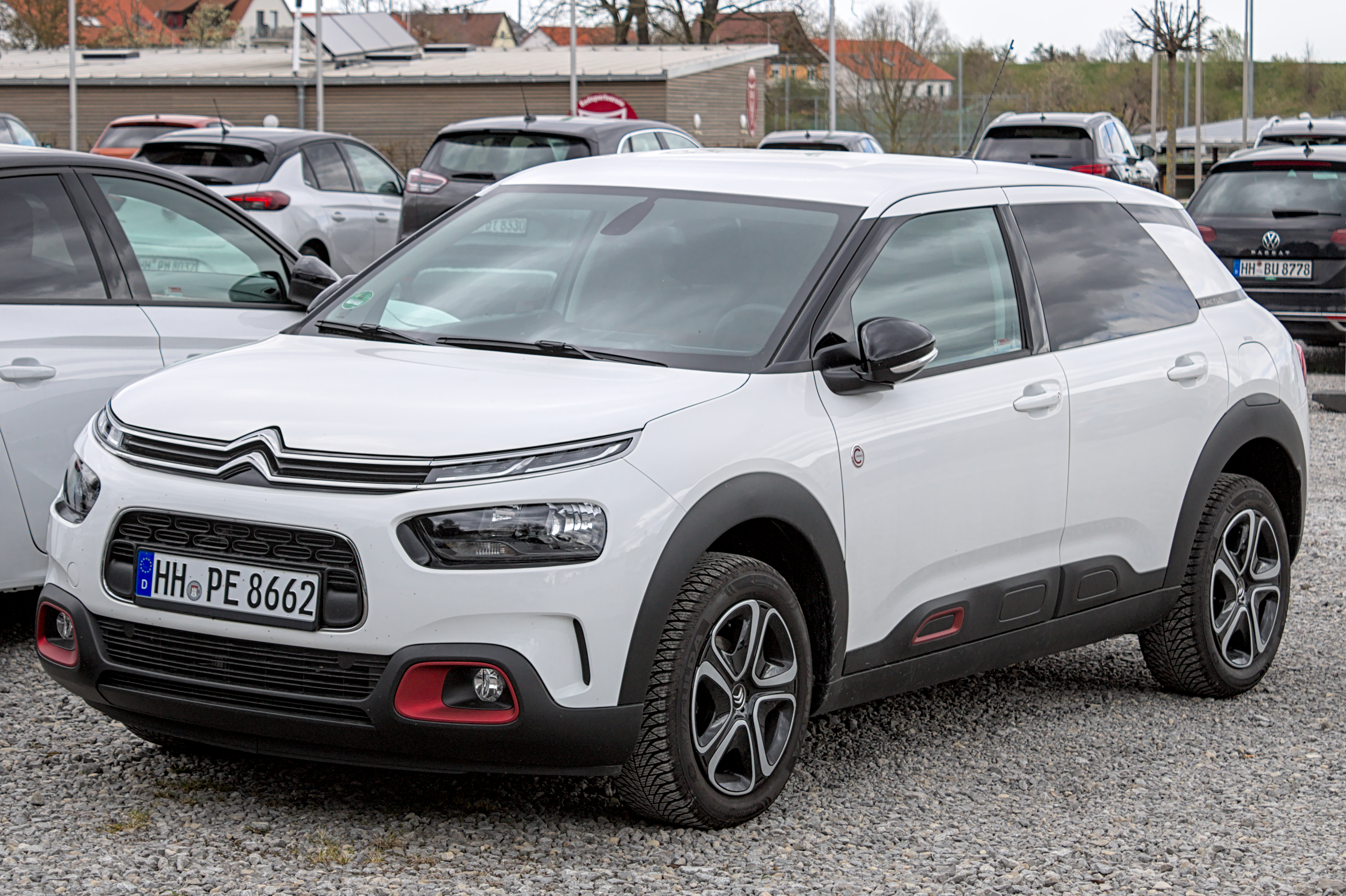
Citroën C4 Cactus

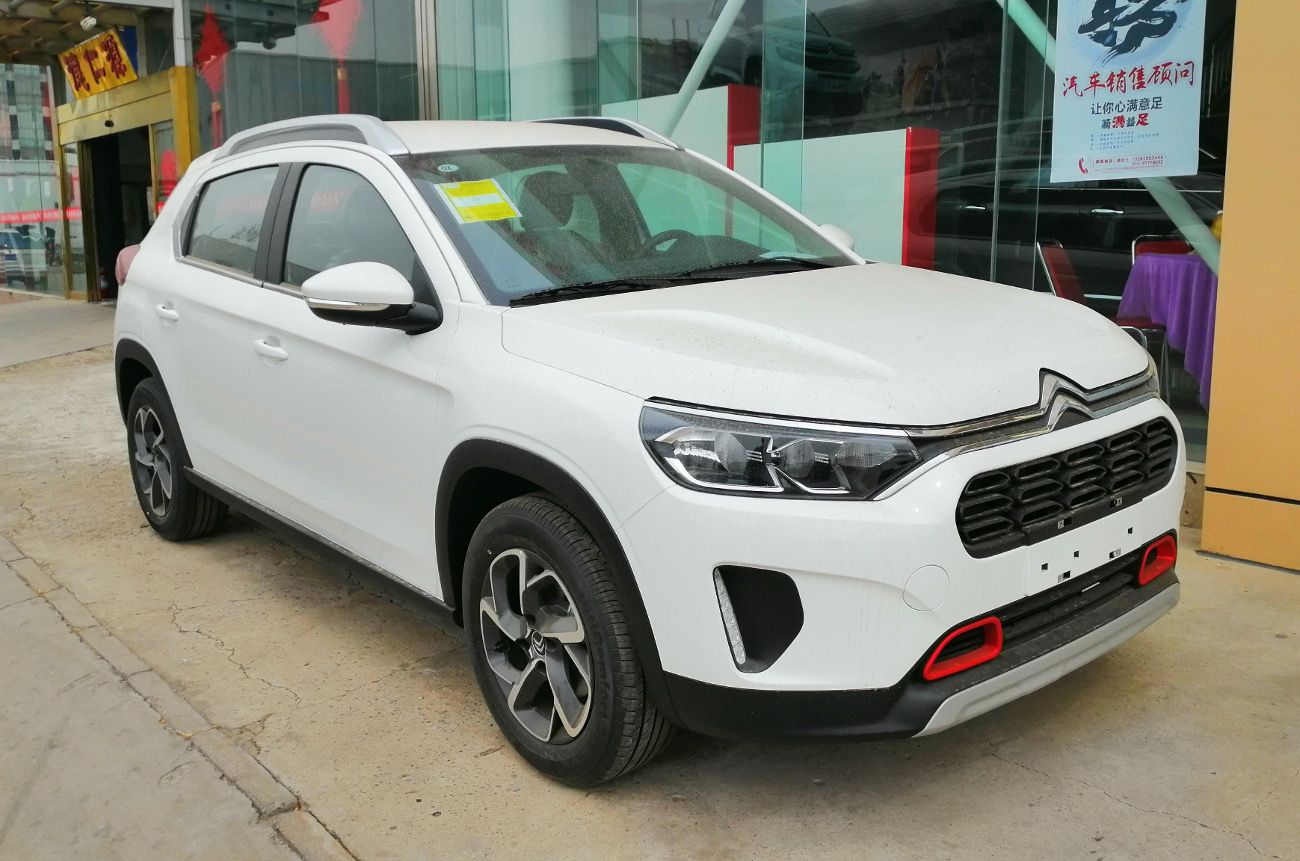
Citroën C3-XR

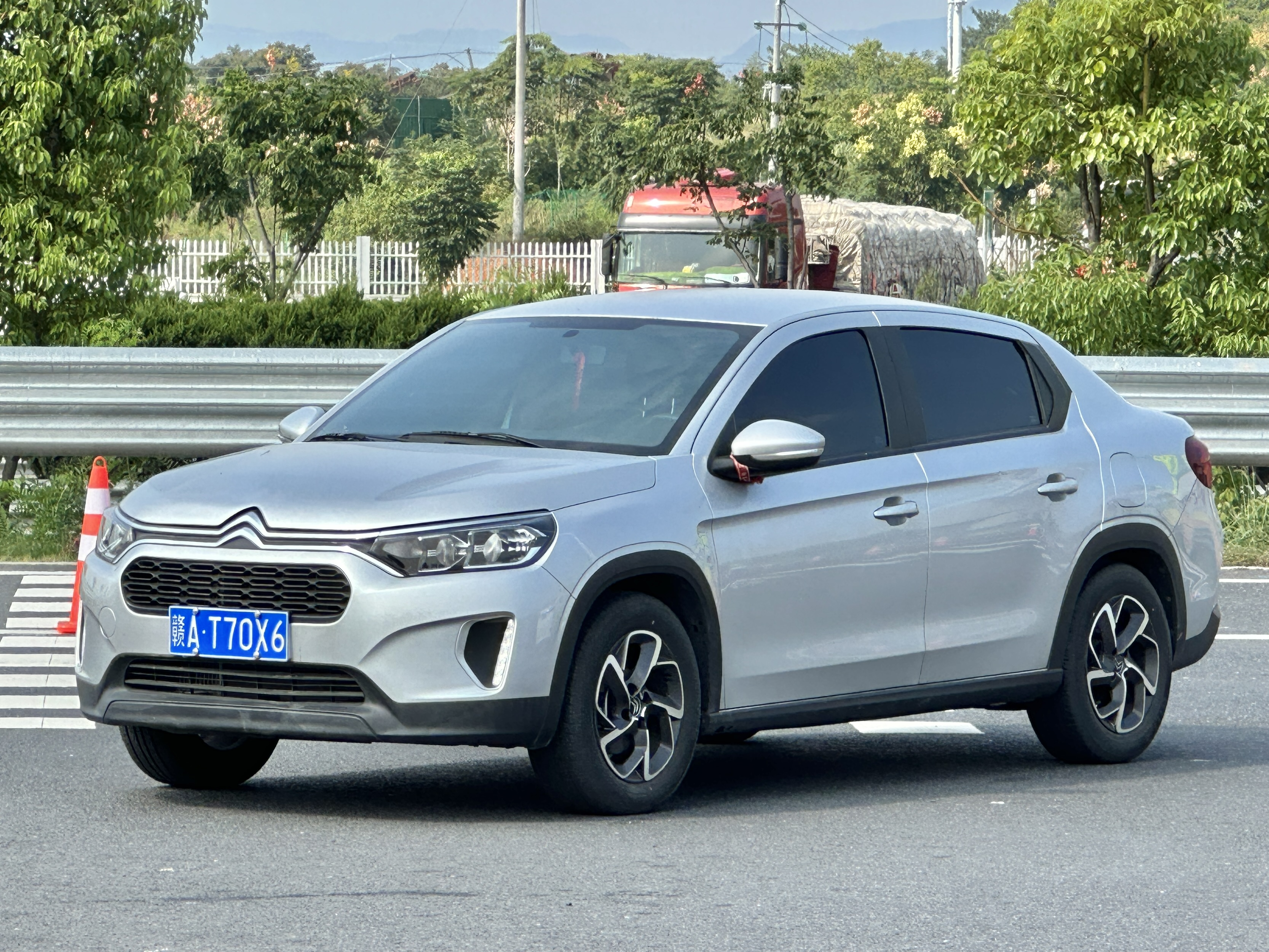
Citroën C3L

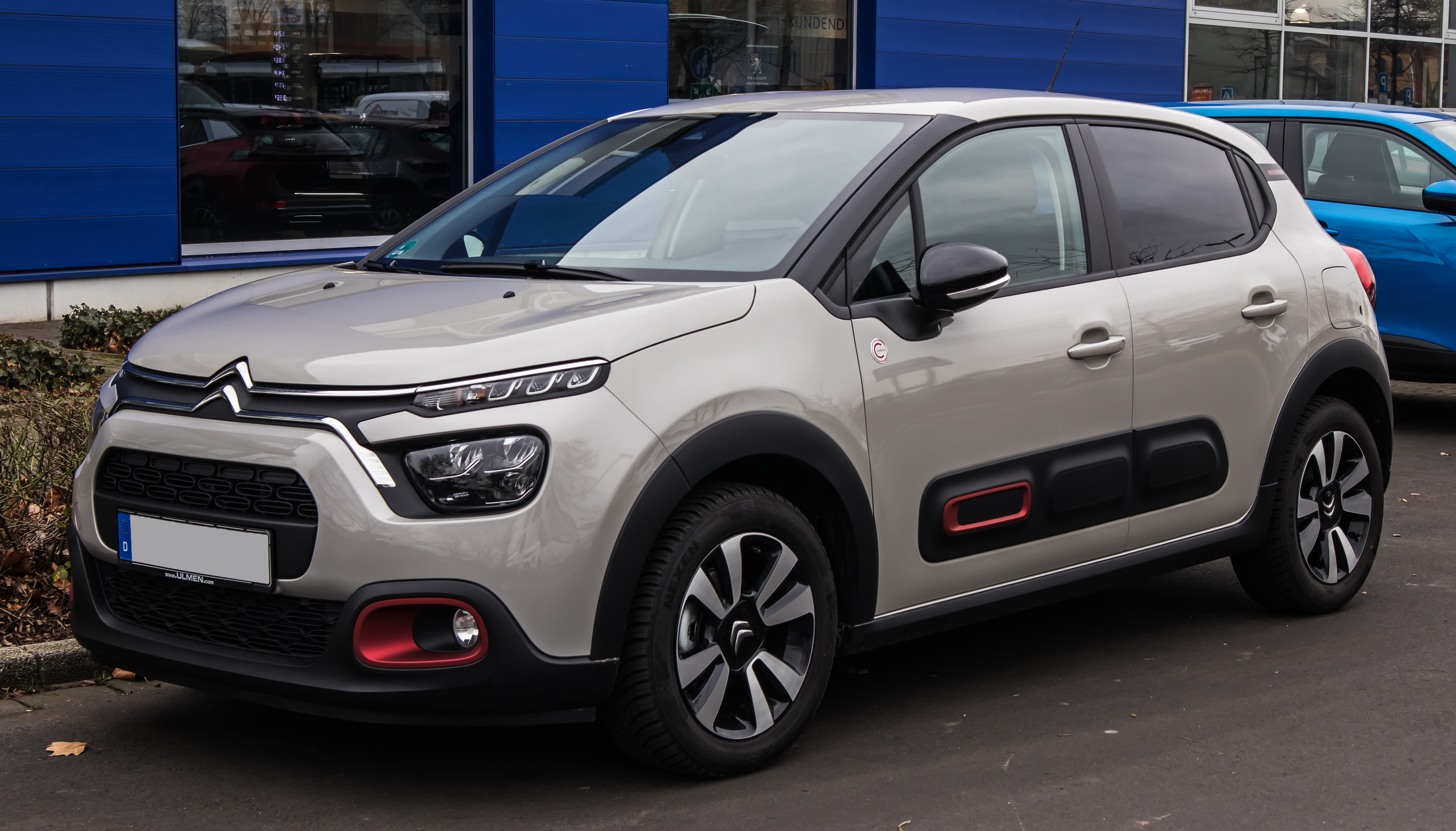
Citroën C3 III

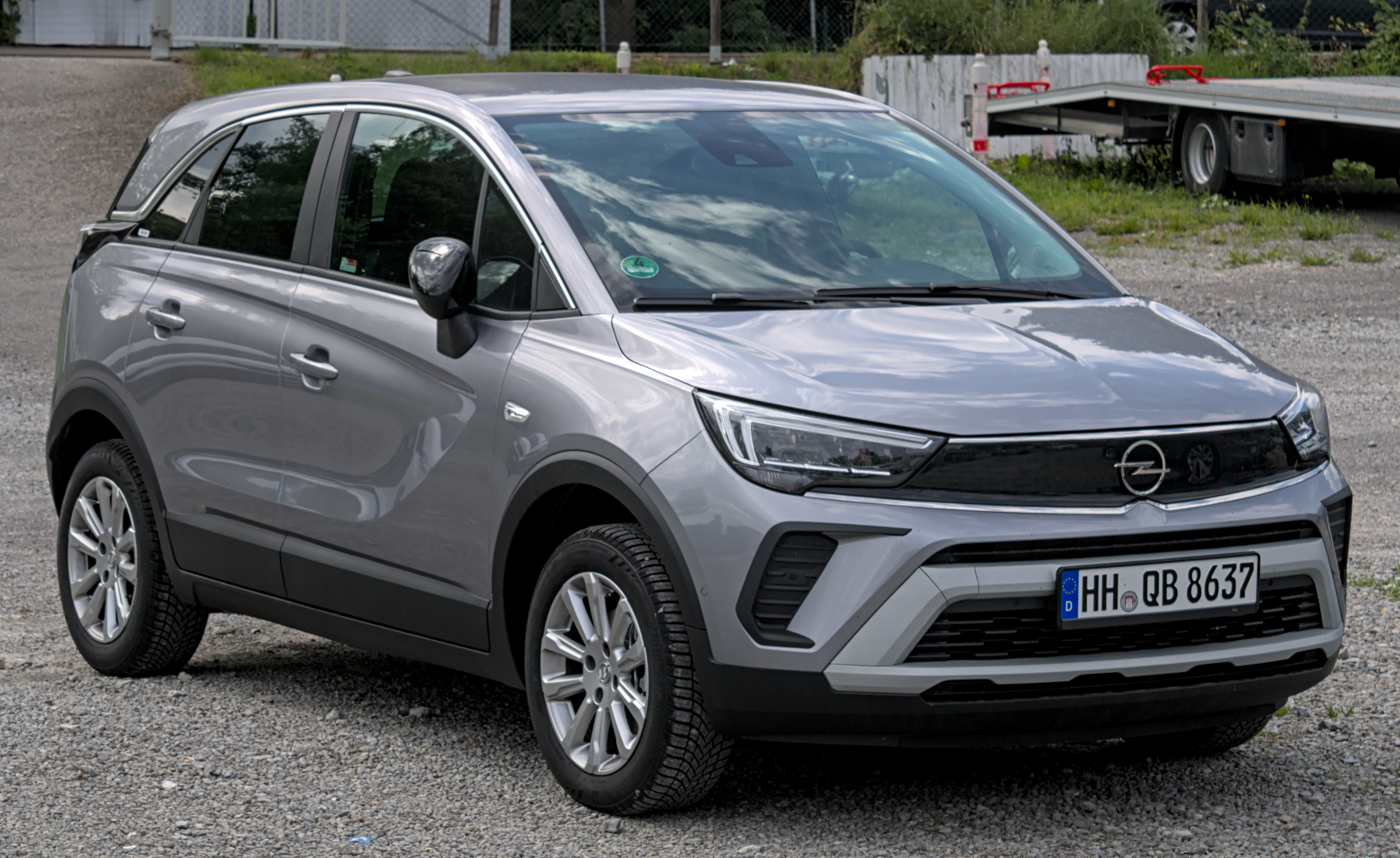
Opel/Vauxhall Crossland X/Crossland

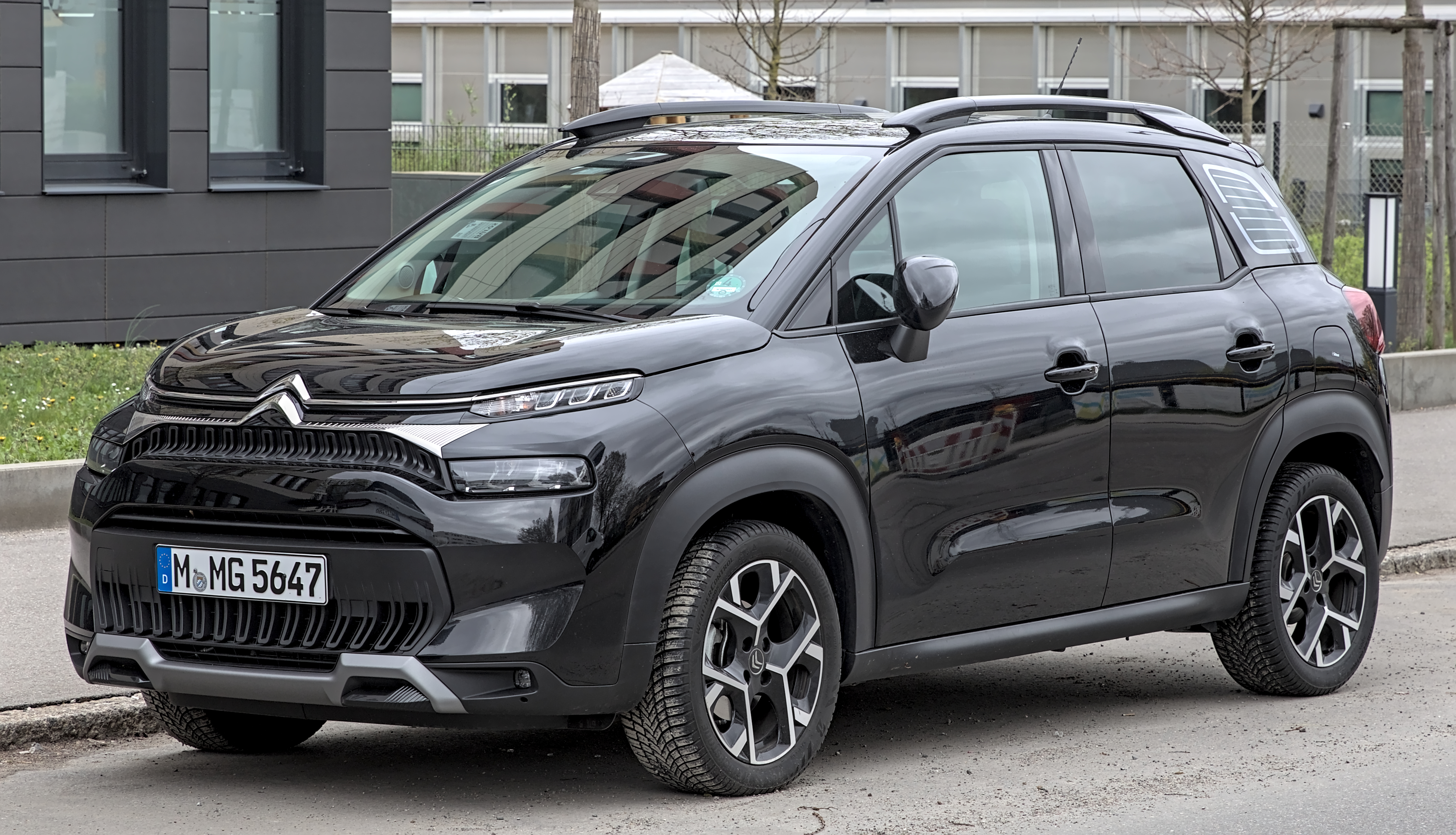
Citroën C3 Aircross

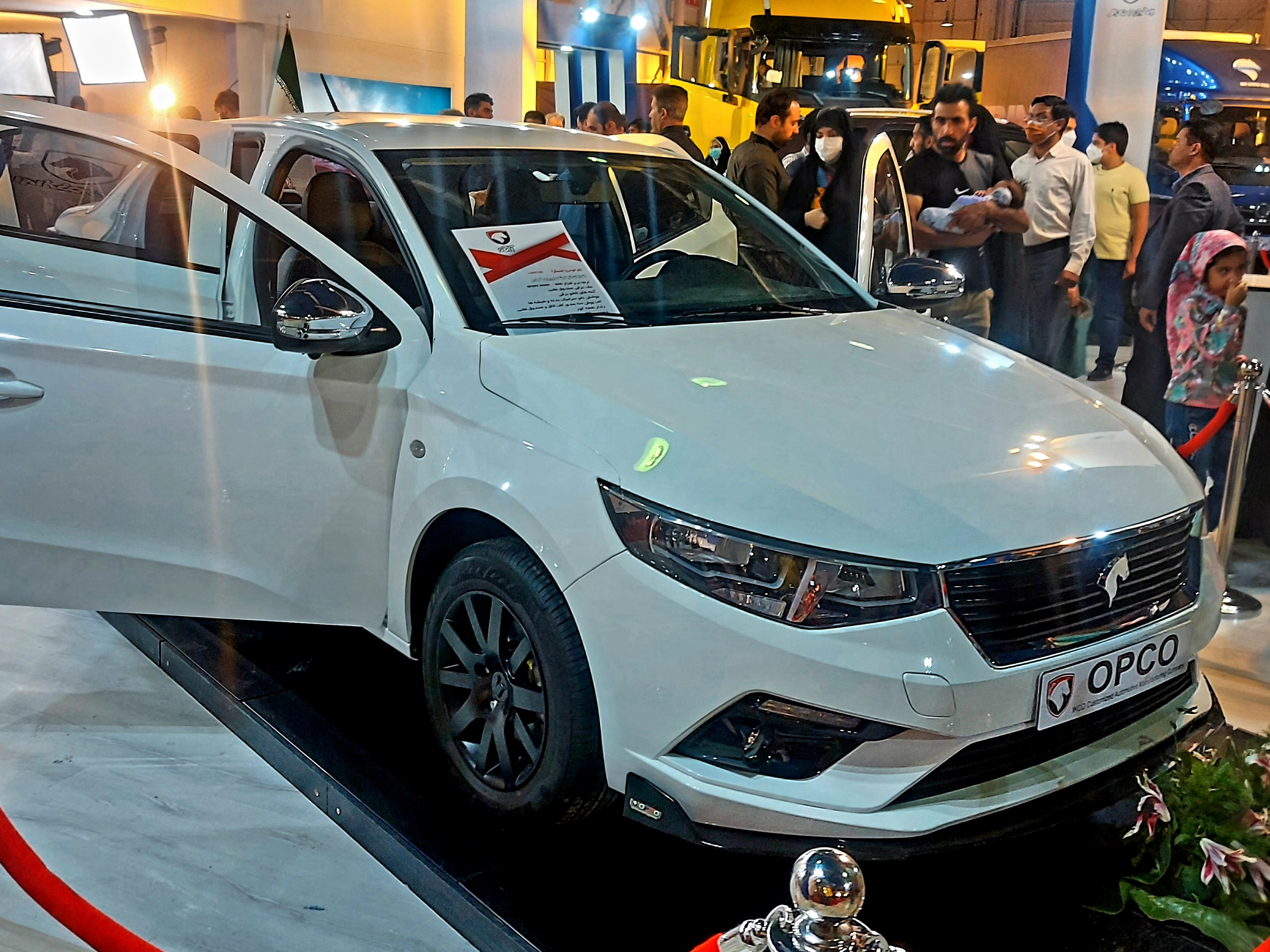
IKCO Tara
