= Geoffrey Leonard Matthews =

English car designer (1946–2015)

Geoff Matthews 1988

Geoffrey Leonard Matthews (widely known as Geoff Matthews) (September 1946 – 24 January 2015) was an English car designer who designed cars for manufacturers, including Chrysler, Talbot and Citroën.

== Early life ==
Matthews was born to Joan, who had conceived him with Charlie Mann, a Canadian serviceman based in England while awaiting return to his home country at the end of World War II. Unwilling to raise a child who would be stigmatised as illegitimate, and with Mann now gone, Joan arranged for Matthews to be adopted; he grew up in a family of farm labourers that picked hops for a living. He won a place at grammar school, then went on to study car design at the Royal College of Art.

== Notable achievements ==
Matthews worked on the exterior design of numerous vehicles, including: the Chrysler Alpine of 1976 (aka Simca 1308), Chrysler Sunbeam, Talbot Tagora, Matra Rancho and the car that would become the Renault Espace.

During the 1980s Matthews moved to France where he was promoted to Chief Exterior Designer at Citroën, where he oversaw the development of the exterior designs for production cars, refreshes and concepts. This involved working on the Citroën AX, BX, series 2 CX as well as XM.

During his time at Citroën, Matthews also spearheaded the EOLE project, which was displayed at the 1986 Geneva Motor Show, and pioneered developments in aerodynamics and design.

== Views on car design ==
In an interview in 1990 by Gavin Green for Car magazine, Matthews was quoted as saying, "There is less room for visionary individuals than there used to be: less room for the very people who gave us the car industry in the first place. The great old men of the car industry – the ones with the vision and power to get things done – have gone. The Ferdinand Porsches, Enzo Ferraris, William Lyonses, Henry Royces. Those men stamped their personalities on their cars."

== Later career ==
Following his time at Citroën, Matthews took up key positions in a number of companies including; Styling International (a subsidiary of Hawtal Whiting Design), MGA Developments, Geoff Matthews Design, Facel Vega Motors, Connaught Motor Company. Matthews also took up roles within the Automotive Design Courses at Coventry and Swansea University.

He was the subject of a BBC documentary, This Was My Dad - The Rise & Fall of Geoffrey Matthews.
