= Citroën CX =

Car model made by Citroën

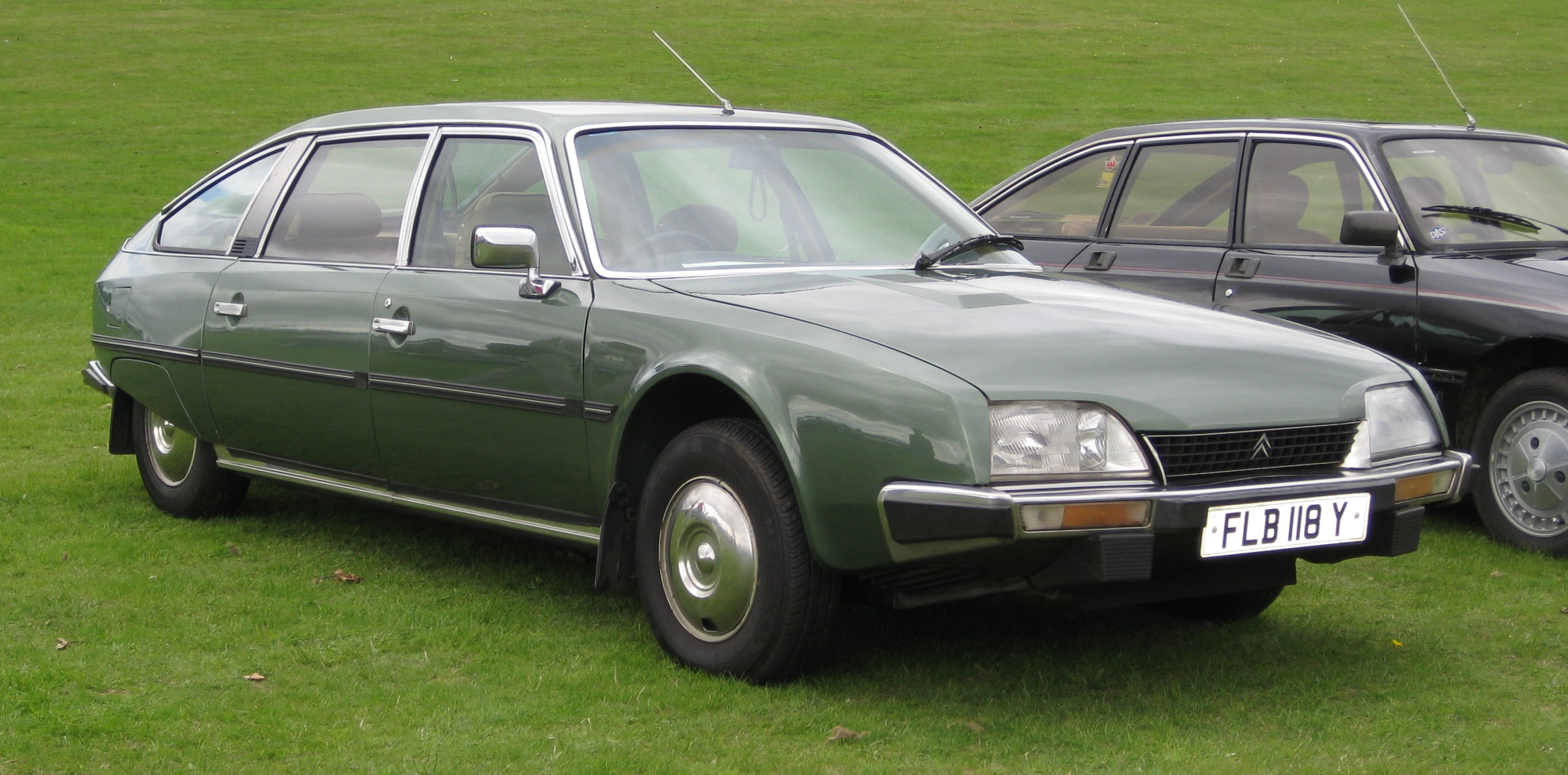
- 1983 Citroën CX Prestige (longer wheelbase)

Overview
- Manufacturer: Citroën
- Production: 1974–1991
- Model years: 1975–1991 (North America)
- Assembly: France: Aulnay-sous-Bois; France: Cerizay (Heuliez: estates, 1989–1991); Chile: Arica; Spain: Vigo (Vigo Plant); Portugal: Mangualde (Mangualde Plant); Yugoslavia: Koper (Cimos); Thailand: Bangkok (Yontrakit Group, CX 20)
- Designer: Robert Opron; Geoff Matthews (Series 2 refresh)

Body and chassis
- Class: Mid-size luxury / Executive car (E)
- Body style: 4-door fastback 4-door fastback long wheelbase 5-door break (estate)
- Layout: Transverse front-engine, front-wheel drive

Powertrain
- Engine: 2.0L I4; 2.2L I4; 2.3L I4; 2.4L I4; 2.5L I4; 2.5L diesel I4
- Transmission: 5-speed manual 4-speed manual 3-speed automatic ZF 3HP22; 3-speed semi-automatic

Dimensions
- Wheelbase: 2,845 mm (112.0 in)
- Length: 4,666 mm (183.7 in)
- Width: 1,730 mm (68.1 in)
- Height: 1,360 mm (53.5 in)
- Curb weight: 1,265–1,520 kg (2,789–3,351 lb)

Chronology
- Predecessor: Citroën DS
- Successor: Citroën XM

The Citroën CX is a large, front-engined, front-wheel-drive executive car/luxury car manufactured and marketed by Citroën from 1974 to 1991. Production models were either a standard wheelbase or a stretched, more luxurious, four-door fastback saloon, as well as a station wagon (estate), on the longer wheelbase. The CX is known for its hydropneumatic self-leveling suspension system (continued and improved from its DS predecessor), and its (at the time) low 0.36 drag coefficient, normally noted as a vehicle's $c_x$ in French. Restyled as 'CX', the model name underscored this.

Voted the 1975 European Car of the Year, the CX has been described by some enthusiasts as the last "real Citroën" before Peugeot took control of the company in 1976. The CX was also the final successful model of the "big Citroën" era, dating back to 1934.

== History ==
The CX was launched at the 1974 Paris Motor Show. Citroën was unable to schedule right-hand drive production of the car until well into 1975. The CX was initially a huge success in Europe, with more than 132,000 being produced in 1978. It found customers beyond the loyal DS customer base and used the technology of Citroën's advanced grand touring personal luxury car, the SM. Unlike its principal competitors, the CX did not have worldwide distribution—the cost of development and improvements had to be met from a geographically small sales base. According to Driving & Motoring Month the CX "provides a startlingly intelligent set of solutions to modern motoring problems".

=== Design ===
The CX's flowing lines and sharp Kammback rear were designed by auto stylist Robert Opron, resembling its precursor the GS. Citroën had been using a wind tunnel for many years, and the CX was designed to perform well in aerodynamic drag, with a coefficient of drag of 0.36. Indeed, the car's name of CX refers to the French term for drag coefficient, or coefficient ('C') along the X-axis ('x', being the longitudinal). A notable feature was the concave rear window, designed to clear rain from the rear window without the need for a rear window wiper.

Mechanically, the car was one of the most advanced of its time, combining Citroën's hydro-pneumatic integral self-leveling suspension, speed-sensitive DIRAVI fully-powered steering (first introduced on the Citroën SM), and a uniquely effective interior design that did away with steering column stalks, allowing the driver to reach all controls while both hands remained on the steering wheel. A Citroën design principle was that turning signals should not cancel themselves—this should be a conscious decision of the driver. The CX perpetuated this feature, which is not shared by virtually any other contemporary automobile, limiting the CX's potential use as a rental car.

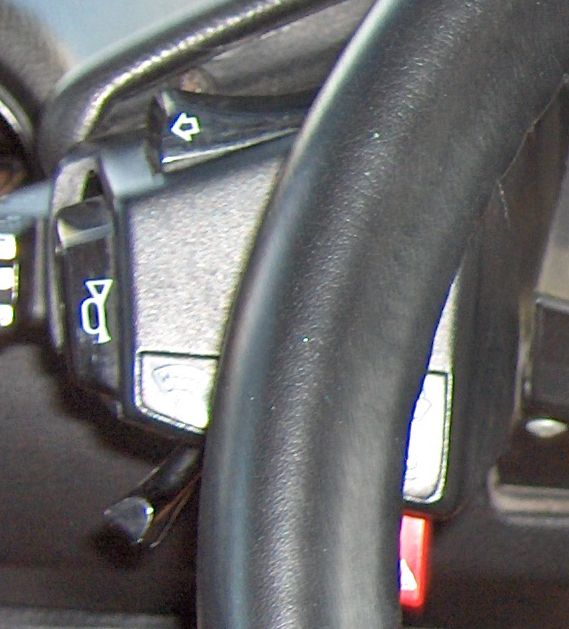
No stalks - control buttons reached by hands on steering wheel

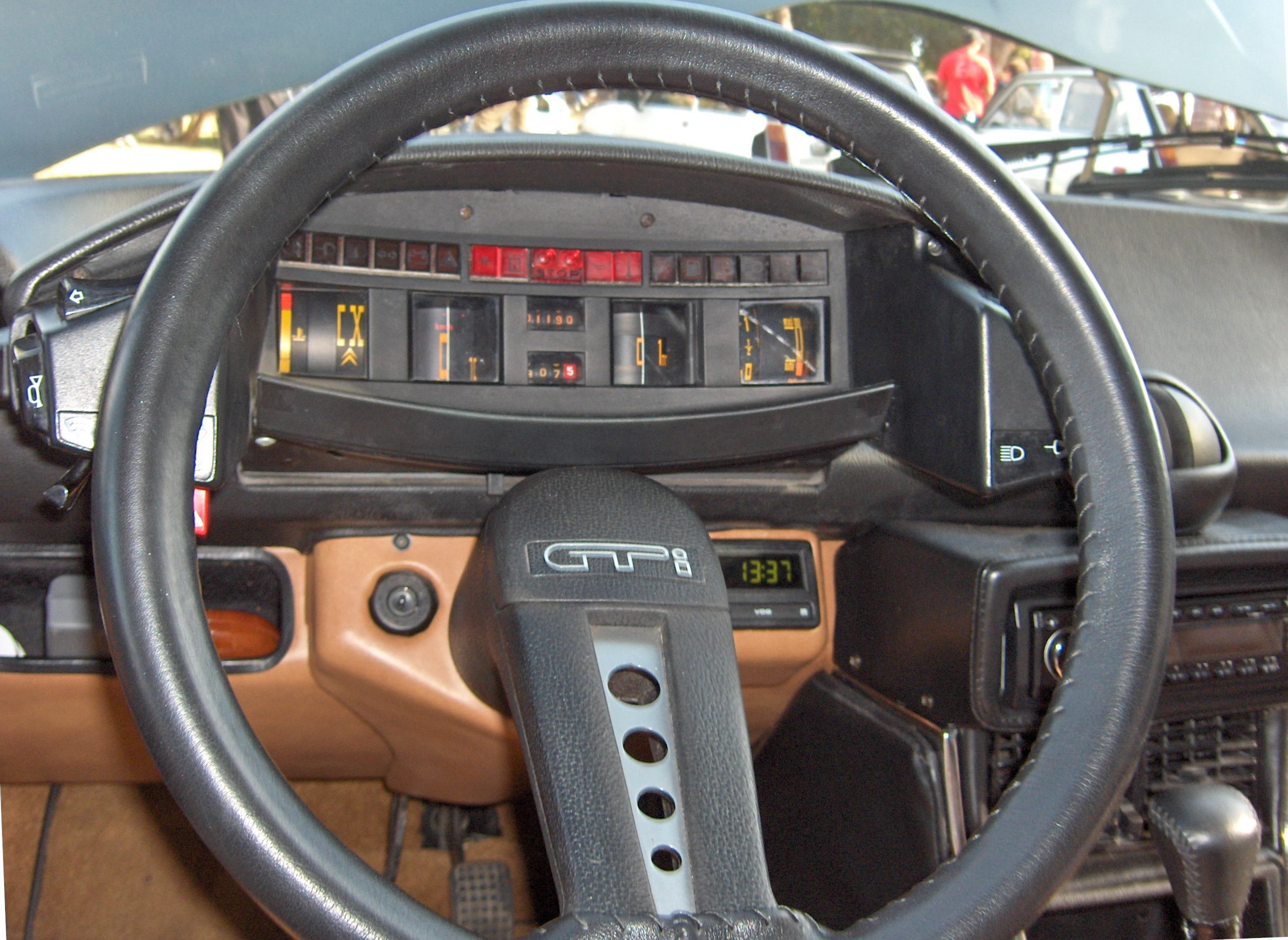
"Spaceship" dashboard with rotating drum speedometer in Series 1 CX models (1974–85)

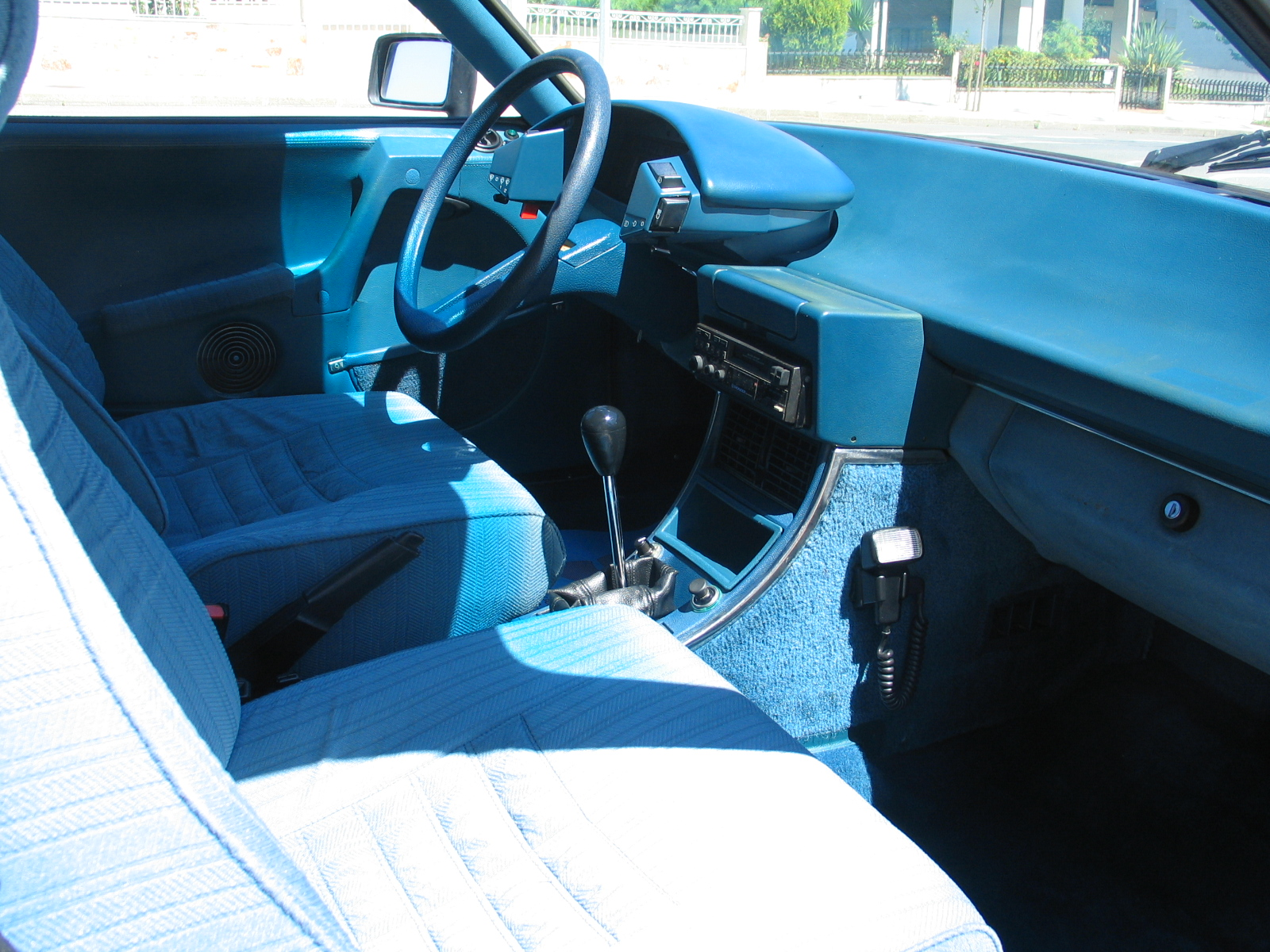
Series 1 dashboard

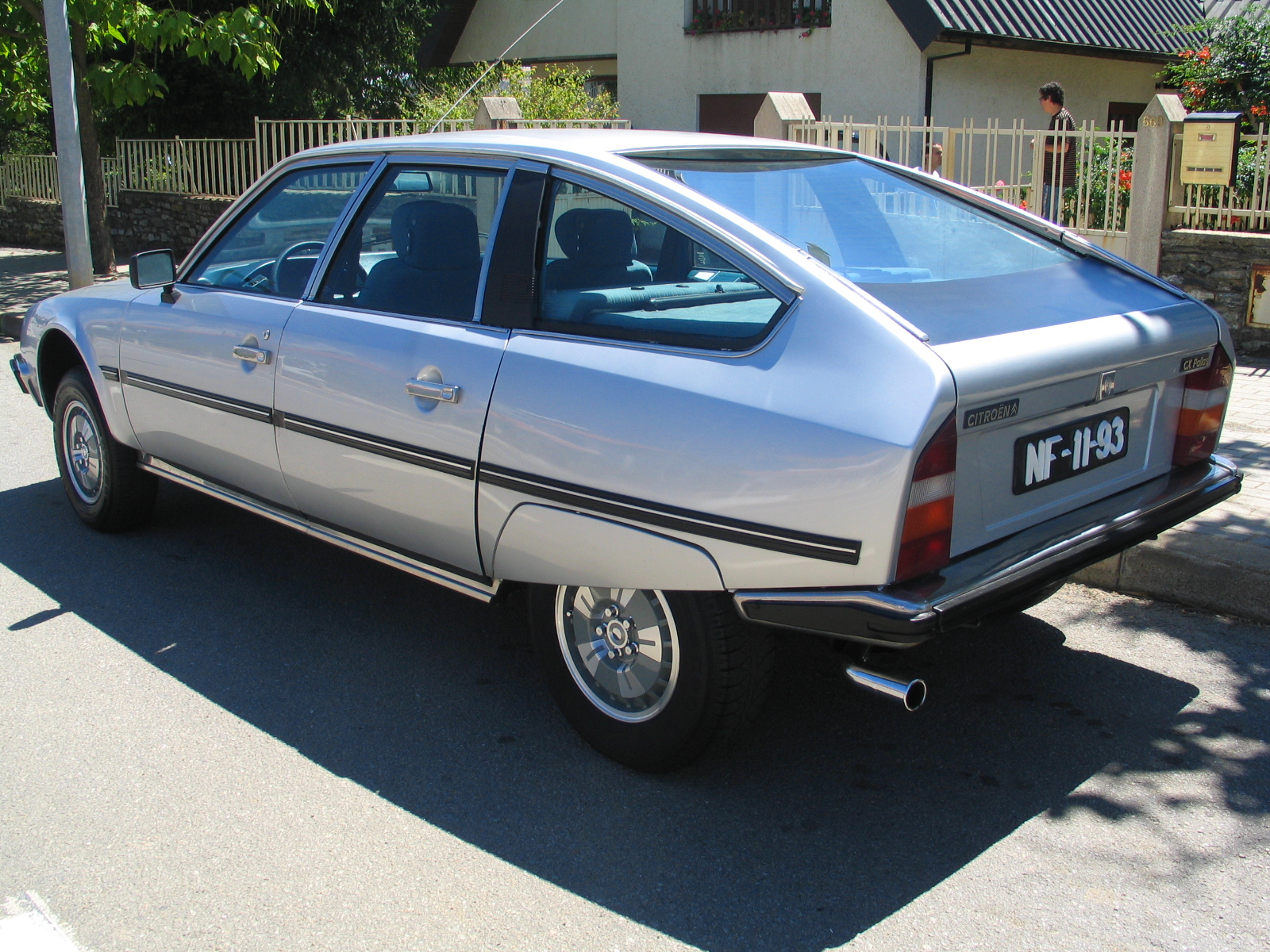
Series 1 with suspension in "high" position

The ability of the CX suspension to soak up large undulations and yet damp out rough surfaces resulted in a consistent ride quality when empty or fully laden. The suspension was attached to sub-frames that were fitted to the body through flexible mountings, to improve the ride quality and reduce road noise. The British Car magazine described driving a CX as hovering over road irregularities, much like a ship traversing above the ocean floor. The constant ground clearance component of this suspension was used under license by Rolls-Royce on the Silver Shadow, and the Bentley T series. The Mercedes-Benz 450SEL 6.9 was not built under license, but copied the Hydropneumatic suspension principles after the less effective Mercedes-Benz 600 Air suspension installation.

The CX has a transverse engine arrangement, in contrast to the longitudinal mid-engine layout of the Traction Avant and DS. This brings multiple benefits: significant mechanical packaging space savings (the CX is 20 cm (8 in) shorter than the DS); dramatically less engine noise in the cabin (Traction Avant and DS engines are partially in the cabins of those cars); and, improved access for maintenance of many under-bonnet items.

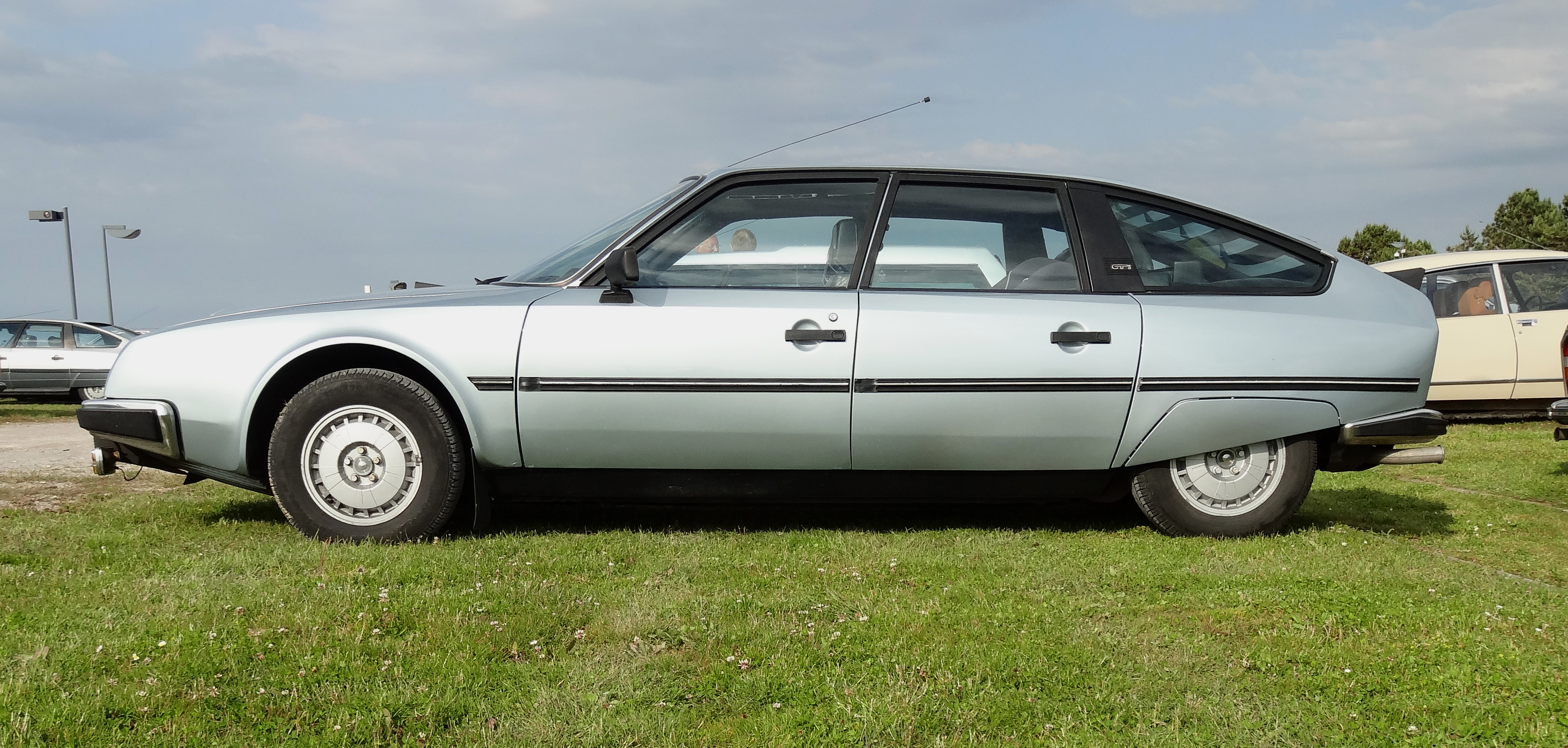
Citroën CX standard WB; profile view

The CX saloon was always of a fastback design, with a trunk lid hinged beneath the rear window, like many prior fastbacks from the late 1940s until the CX's era – but unlike almost every other 1970s sedan, which either offered a hatchback body, like the successful Volkswagen Passat and Saab 900, or exclusively hatchbacked contemporaries as the Rover SD1 and Renault 20/30.

Aftermarket hatchback conversions to the CX were offered by Caruna and Beutler. Citroën's own 1970 compact GS, and the small Alfa Romeo Alfasud were also initially released as fastback sedans, but both received hatchbacks in the late 1970s.

=== Launch ===
At launch in 1974, the CX was rushed to market, with some teething troubles. Some very early models did not have power steering and proved difficult to drive as the CX carries 70% of its weight over the front wheels.

Originally, the CX was developed as a rotary-engined car—with several negative consequences. The CX engine bay is small because rotary engines are compact, but the Comotor three-rotor rotary engine was not economical and the entire rotary project was scrapped the year the CX was introduced. Citroën went bankrupt in 1974, partly due to a series of investments like Comotor that didn't result in profitable products. Production versions of the CX were powered by a range of inline four cylinder engines - only the very rare 168 PS (124 kW) GTi Turbo (1985–89) ever had the engine power to match the capabilities of the chassis. At launch, the carburetor CX was positioned below the 142 PS (104 kW) DS 23 Pallas Injection Electronique and the 180 PS (132 kW) SM Injection Electronique.

There was a choice between three differently powered versions. The "Normale" CX car came with a 1985 cc version of the four cylinder engine from the predecessor model with a claimed maximum output of 102 PS (75 kW), which was slightly more than had been available from the engine when fitted in the DS. The "Economique" version of the car (reflecting the continuing impact of the 1973 oil price shock) came with the same engine as the "Normale", but the 4th gear ratio was changed, along with the final drive ratio, giving rise to a 7 km/h (4 mph) reduction in top speed in return for usefully improved fuel economy. More performance came from the "CX 2200", fitted with a 2175 cc version of the engine and a twin carburetor, resulting in a claimed maximum output of 112 PS (82 kW).

Contemporary reports also indicated that the cost of setting up a new production facility for the CX, on the northern edge of Paris, at Aulnay-sous-Bois, also played a role in undermining the company's finances to the point where it was obliged to surrender its independence to the more financially cautious Peugeot company. On 12 July 2012, PSA announced the permanent closure of the Aulnay-sous-Bois plant.

=== Development ===
Despite its early success in the European market, the CX development did not keep pace with its competitors in the luxury and executive market.

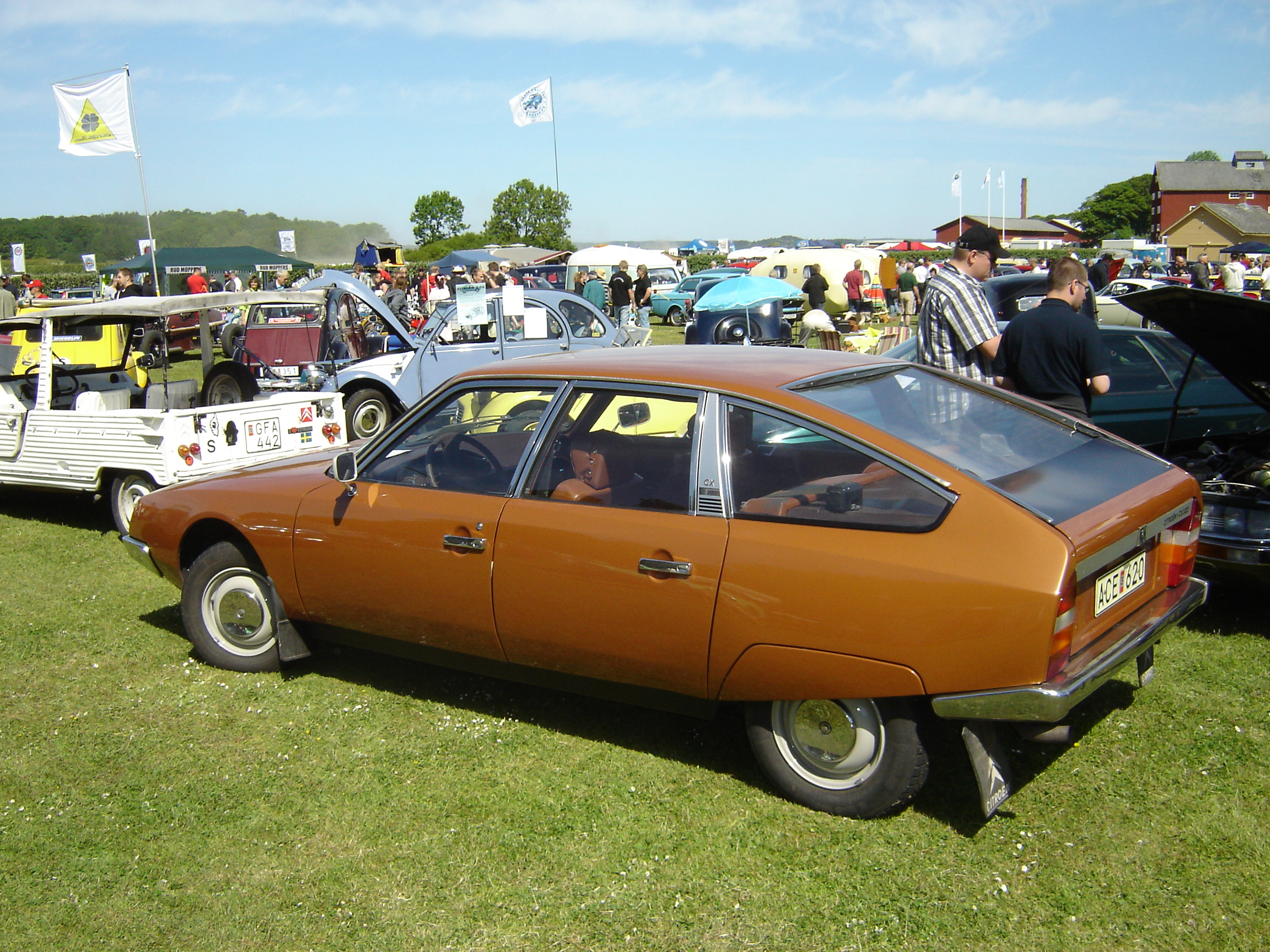
1975 Citroën CX 2000

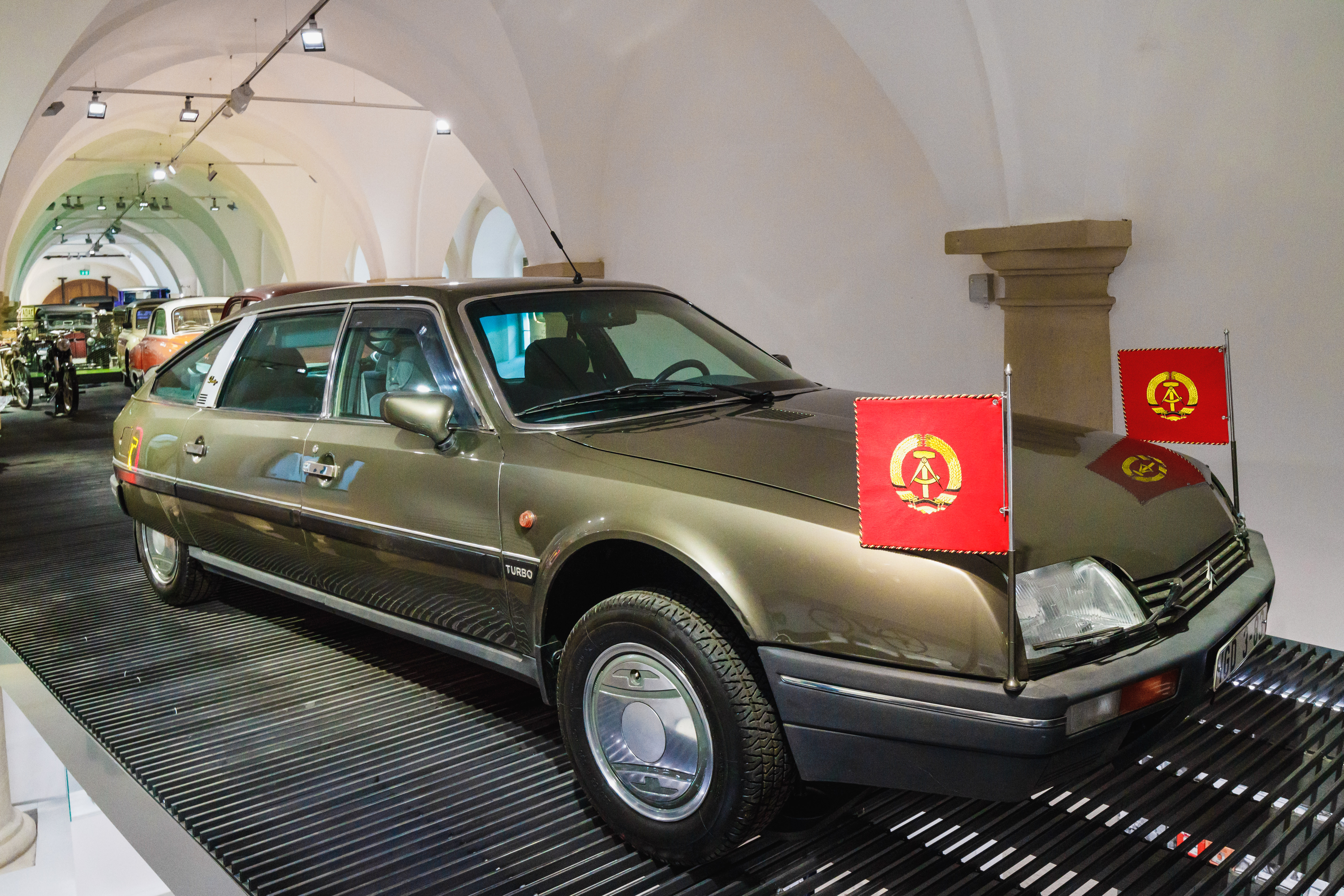
1989 CX Prestige Turbo 2 at Dresden Transport Museum

The parent company, PSA Peugeot Citroën, was fielding three cars in the executive car segment, the Peugeot 604, the Talbot Tagora and the CX, all competing for PSA's scarce financial resources. PSA's retreat from this segment was influenced by these diffused efforts.

In 1974, the DS featured a 130 PS (96 kW) fuel-injected 2.3-litre engine, while the new CX 2000 generated 102 PS (75 kW), giving it acceleration from 0–60 mph (97 km/h) of 12 seconds. The CX 2200 improved on this, and eventually the 2400 engine (the 2347 cc unit as used in the DS) arrived; originally only in the Prestige. A regular CX 2400 arrived at the 1976 Paris Salon, subsequent to the discontinuation of the CX 2200.

In 1977, the CX GTi received a modern Bosch L-Jetronic injection system, with 128 PS (94 kW).

In late 1979, the venerable, pushrod 2-litre engine was replaced by the new Douvrin engine, developed together with Renault. The engine, coded Type 829, was mounted at a 15-degree forward angle and revolved in the opposite direction of the Renault type. The dipstick was relocated to be at the front of the engine, along with a host of other, minor differences. The new CX 2000 was available in Reflex and Athena trims, replacing the earlier Confort and Super. The new engine was quieter, smoother running, more economical, had slightly more power at 106 PS (78 kW), while costing less than the old DS engine. The new CX 2000 was the first French petrol car which was able to drive from Paris to Marseille on a single tank of fuel. At the same time, the CX Limousine was introduced: this combined the Prestige's longer bodyshell with the new diesel engine, with equipment equivalent to that of the mid-level Athena.

In 1981, factory rustproofing and a fully automatic transmission were added.

In 1984, a new, turbo-powered 2.5 L diesel engine did make the CX Turbo-D 2.5 the fastest diesel sedan in the world, able to reach speeds up to 195 km/h (121 mph). Diesels have accounted for more than half the market for executive cars in France.

In 1985, the GTi Turbo petrol model, with a top speed of over 220 km/h (137 mph), gave the CX the powerful engine that finally used the full capabilities of the chassis.

The CX eventually acquired a reputation for high running costs, which over time cut sales. The components standard to any automobile (steel, door hinges, starter motors, electrical connections, etc) proved troublesome in service, not the advanced components. The quality of construction improved too slowly to eliminate this perception.

Although the minor 1985 Series 2 changes did create initial interest from press and public alike, they did little to revive sales, with 35,000 units being produced in 1986 and 1987.

While the DS achieved its greatest sales success at age 15 (1970) the CX design was subject to more intense competitive pressures, sales peaking at age 4 (1978). Other automakers succeeded in using the CX design as a template for improvement. In particular, the Audi 100 introduced an aerodynamically restyled variant in 1983.

1,170,645 CXs were sold from 1974 to 1991.

== Racing ==
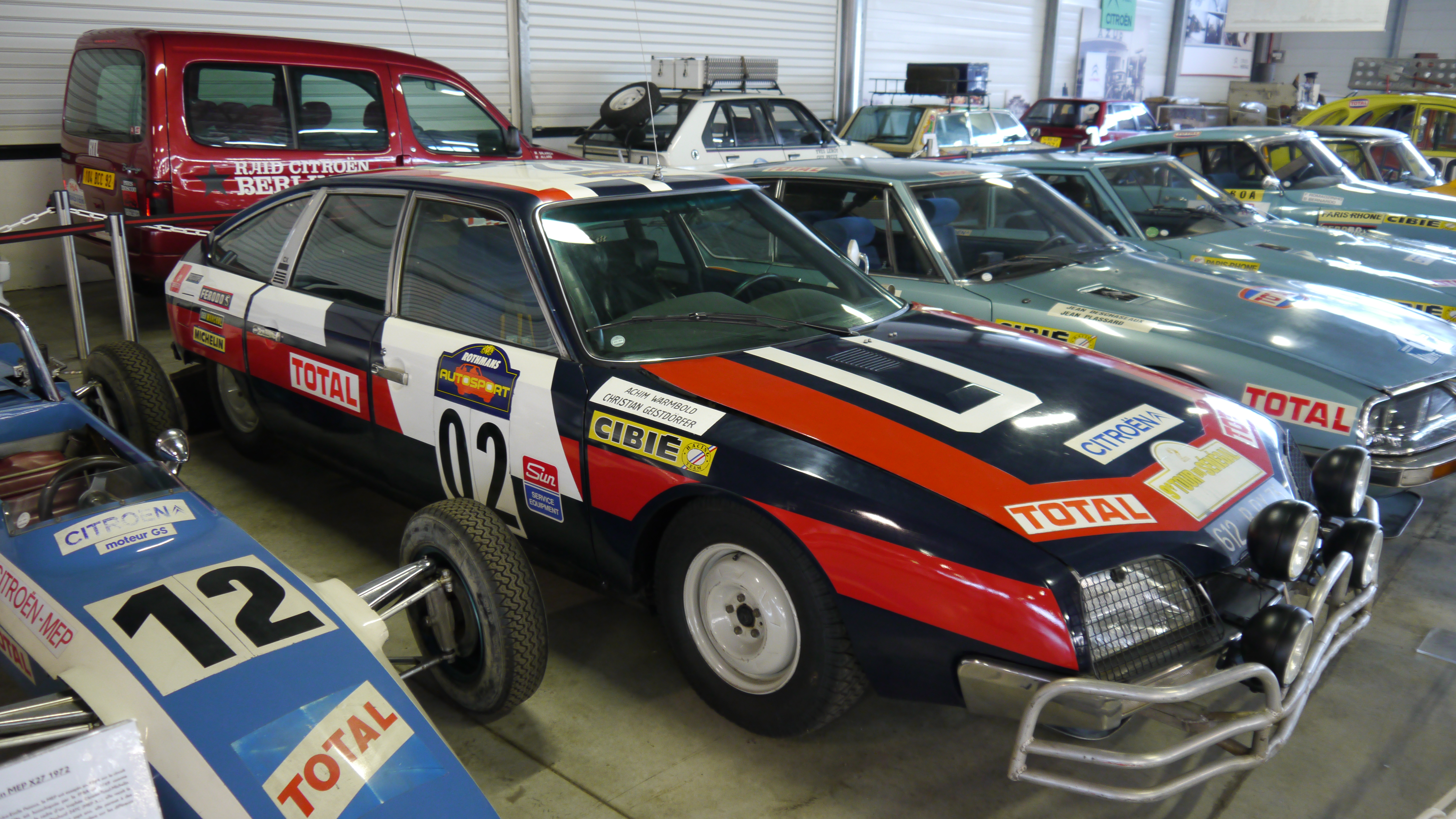
1977 CX GTi rally car from Citroën Conservatoire

Despite the challenging finances of Citroën at the time of launch, the CX was entered in numerous rally driving events, like Tour du Senegal and Paris-Dakar, winning five events outright.

One notable achievement was in the 28,200 km (17,500 mi) 1977 London–Sydney Marathon road race, where driver Paddy Hopkirk, driving a CX 2400 sponsored by Citroën's Australian concessionaire, staged a come-from-behind sprint to obtain third place.

The CX competed and finished the 2022 Dakar Rally and 2023 Dakar Rally.

== Replacements ==
Successful competitors in this market segment have adopted a cycle of redesign and substantial improvement every seven years. Despite the success of the CX design (and the company's unbroken legacy of dominance in this segment stretching back to 1934) there was no new and improved "big Citroën" model on the horizon by 1981. CX sales began to slide and, apart from a slight revival after the 1985 facelift, never recovered.

Citroën tried to operate independently and design a CX replacement that updated the flowing CX design (in 1980 and again in 1986). Each time, the parent company PSA Peugeot Citroën killed the project and fired the Citroën designers responsible.

Citroën did incur the expense of designing an entirely new petrol four-cylinder engine in 1984 for the top-of-the-range cars, but the market demanded either inline-six or V6 engines.

The CX saloon was finally replaced by the XM in May 1989. This vehicle was based on the same chassis as the Peugeot 605. It was styled in a distinctive, angular fashion, and fitted with self-levelling hydropneumatic suspension, and featured new electronic controls and branded Hydractive suspension. It also featured a hatchback and a conventional interior rather than the "spaceship" instrument panel of the CX. The XM was clearly related to the BX in layout and construction, but incorporated little design and technology from the CX. The estate remained in production until July 1991, when an estate version of the XM was finally launched.

The XM at first achieved annual sales similar to the modest totals of the CX in the last decade of its life, before a total collapse in demand set in during the mid 1990s. It was retired without an immediate replacement in 2000. Total sales were 333,000 units, less than a third of CX sales, but twice those of the earlier Peugeot 604.

The 2006 Citroën C6, first announced as the C6 Lignage concept car in 1999, appeared to be the direct descendant of the CX. The design of the Citroën flagship was directly inspired by the personality of the CX. It remained in production until the end of 2012 but barely 20,000 examples were sold; the lack of an estate version also hampered sales.

In 2016, Dongfeng Peugeot-Citroën introduced a new large sedan - the Citroën C6 (no relation to earlier models) - a car based on the Dongfeng A9. The CX, which had briefly been sold in China, was referenced in the promotional materials.

== Design variations ==
CX was available from the factory in three body styles, with 13 different straight-four engines.

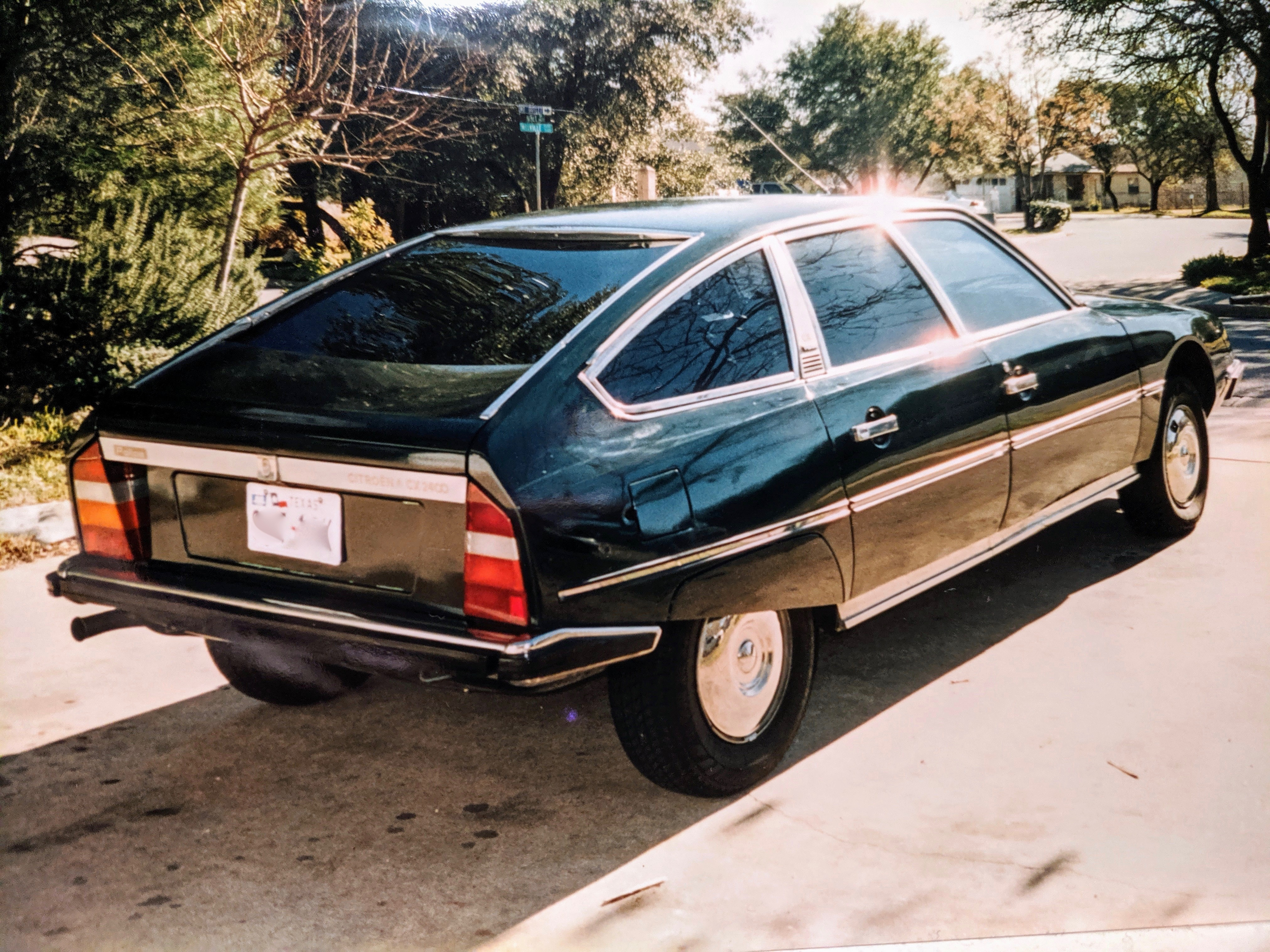
1977 Citroën CX 2400 Pallas (saloon)

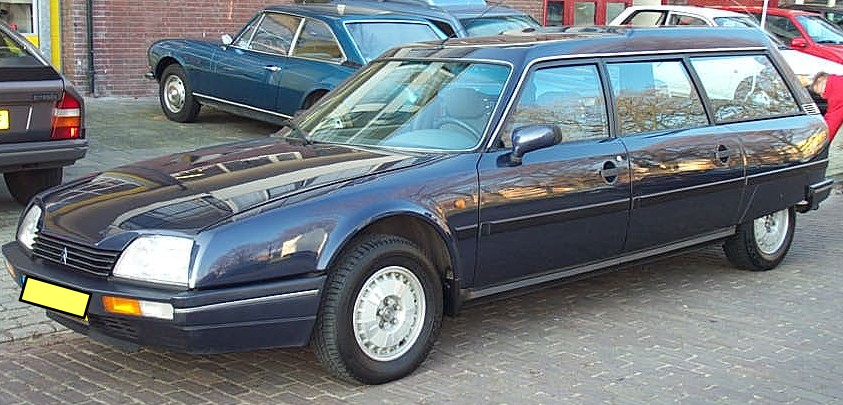

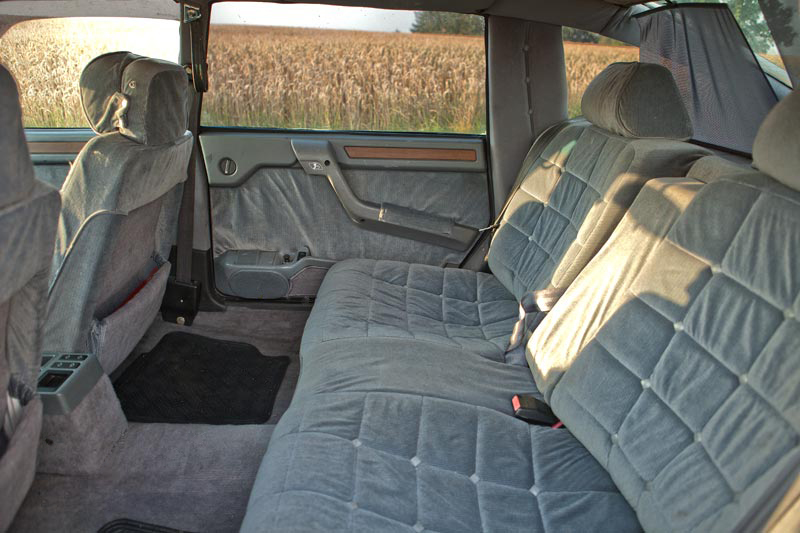
Spacious rear seat of Prestige long wheelbase fastback

=== Saloon ===
The original CX design was a four-door fastback saloon, with a shorter wheelbase. It was sold in a variety of trim and engine options, the highest designated Pallas. The factory never offered a conventional, three-box notchback, nor a hatchback.

=== Estate/Wagon/Break ===
The Estate (Safari in the United Kingdom; Break in France), produced from 1975 until 1991, was a 10 in (25 cm) longer car. The same body style was also offered as the Familiale with three rows of seats, seating seven people. These models had increased load capacity (baggage; equipment; passengers), taking full advantage of the CX's self-levelling suspension.

The Estate was the last CX to be replaced. It was one of the largest, and because of its suspension, most practical, family cars available in Europe. The Safari was a success with speedway riders and other motorcycle racers, as the capacious design meant a bike could easily fit in the back.

=== Prestige ===
The CX saloon had insufficient rear legroom to function as a chauffeur driven limousine (a common use for the spacious DS model), so in 1976, Citroën introduced another 25 cm (10 in) longer version, the Prestige variant. The Prestige offered more rear legroom than any other standard-sized sedan in the world. In 1977, it also gained a raised roofline to improve headroom. Prestiges often came equipped with a vinyl roof. Contemporary reviews of the Prestige were favourable. In 1976 the UK's Driver and Motorist praised its comfort and interior fitments. In 1980, a diesel engine variant was introduced, the Limousine.

=== Series 1 and Series 2 ===
The Series 1 vehicles (1974–85) were characterised by stainless steel front and rear bumpers, hydropneumatic suspension as compliant and soft as the DS, a "spaceship" style dashboard featuring a revolving drum speedometer and similar tachometer.

The Series 2 vehicles (1985–91) can be distinguished by the use of plastic bumpers. The cars lost some of their earlier distinctiveness, but maintained the "stalk-free" layout, where turn signals, wiper controls, horn and headlights could be operated by the driver's fingertips while their hands remained on the steering wheel. The suspension became stiffer in most models, with arguably a more aggressive look, as opposed to the more elegant Series 1 design. Although the dashboard retained the "pod" housing for the instrumentation, it lost the revolving-drum instruments and received a sloping centre dash area, and the radio moved to a position sideways and between the front seats, with the height corrector and heating controls moving to the centre console.

=== Custom models ===
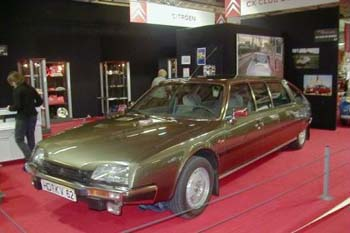
1984 Nilsson-stretched limousine originally used as an official state car by East German head of state Erich Honecker

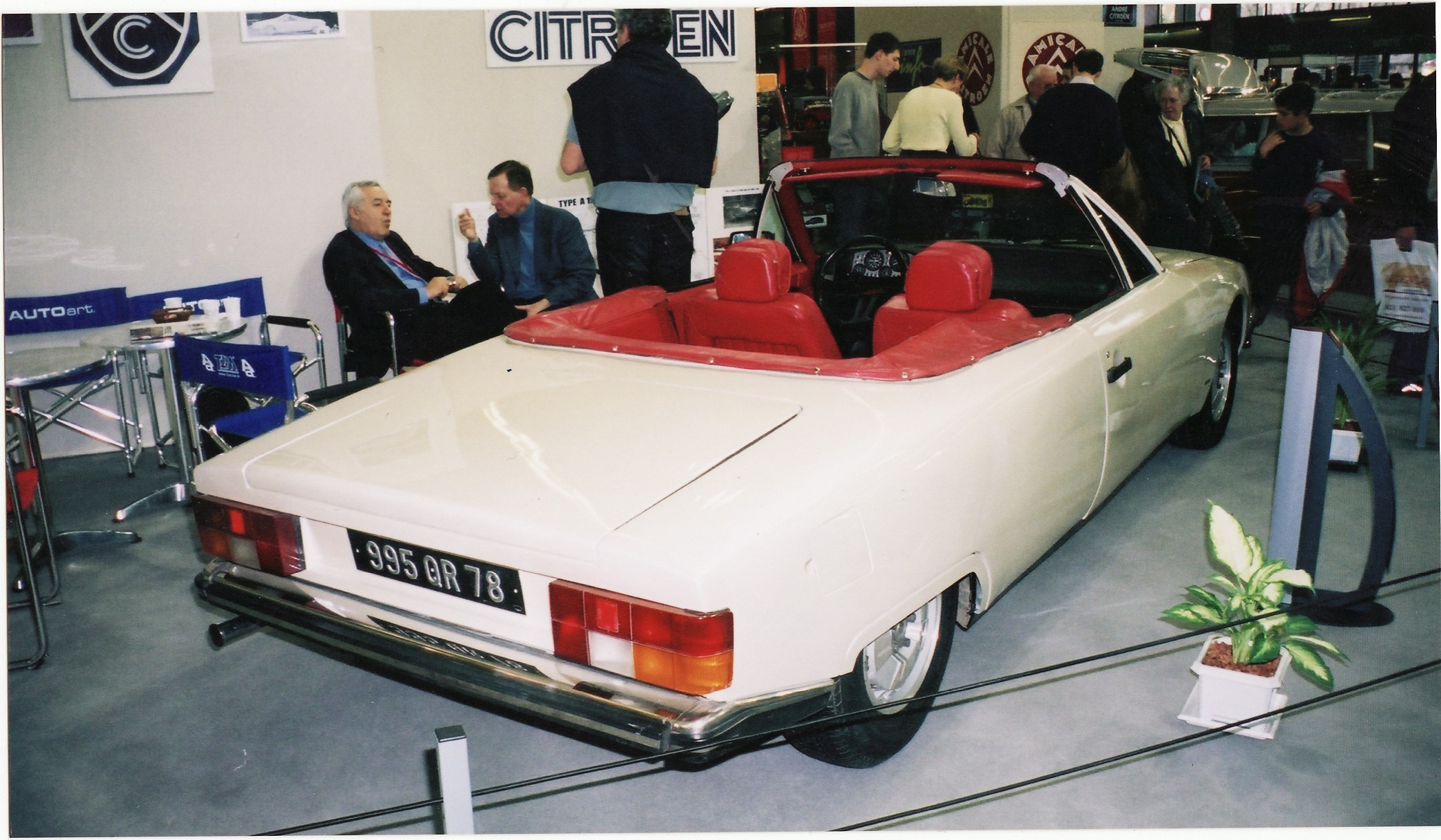
1984 Citroën CX Cabriolet Orphée by Deslandes

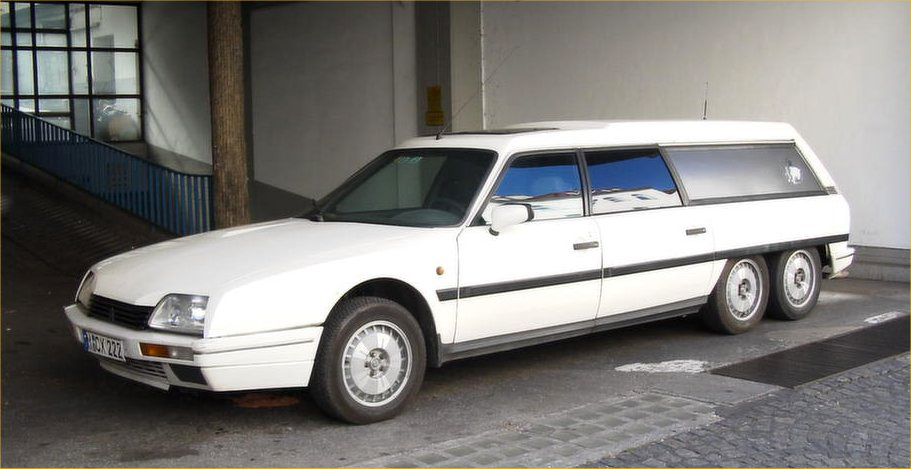
Six-wheeled Citroën CX Series 2 Loadrunner by Mike's Garage

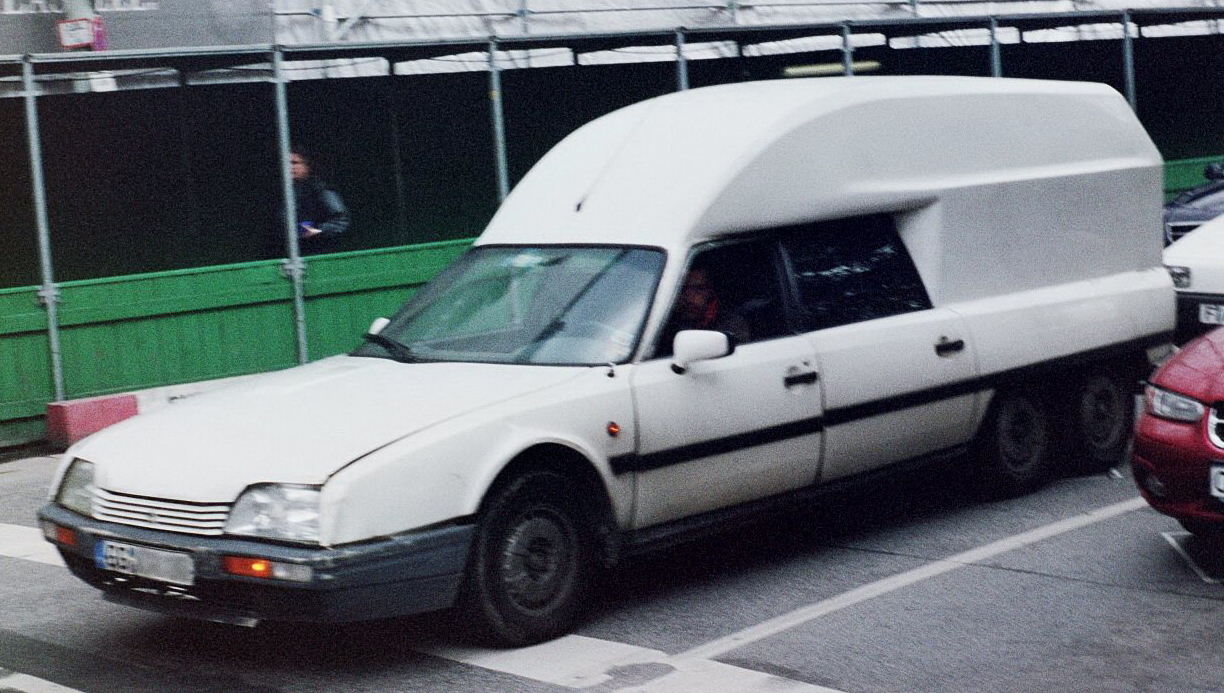
Six-wheeled Citroën CX Series 2 Loadrunner Bagagère (cargo version with raised roof)

The CX was frequently used as an ambulance and camera car, applications where the cosseting suspension was especially valuable.

A number of CX estates were elongated and retrofitted with a second rear axle, mostly used for high speed bulk transport such as carrying newspapers across Europe. They are known as the "Loadrunner" variant. Most of them were prepared by the French company Tissier.

In 1984, Guy Deslandes Design constructed four CX Orphée two-door convertibles.

The Swedish coachbuilder Nilsson produced 15 stretched limousines based on the Prestige from 1978 to 1989 for use as the official state car of the dictator of the German Democratic Republic, Erich Honecker. Three 1985 models were converted during 1989 ahead of a planned state visit by President of France François Mitterrand, however only two of these arrived in East Berlin prior to the fall of the Berlin Wall and German reunification, with the third example remaining undelivered at a Berlin Citroën dealership and the two that were delivered sold by the East German government through the Treuhandanstalt.

=== Transmissions ===
Manual, semi-automatic ("C-Matic") and, ultimately, fully automatic transmissions were fitted, the fully automatic ZF 3HP22 transmission replacing the C-Matic in 1980. Luxury trim-level models were badged as Pallas, and sports variants as GTi. The long-wheelbase models were badged as Prestige (petrol engine) or Limousine (diesel). The factory never produced the CX with both the powerful turbocharged petrol engine and automatic transmission in one car.

=== Engine types ===
Both petrol and diesel-powered models were available in various engine sizes including turbocharged versions. The top-end sports model, alongside the CX Prestige luxury model, was the CX 25 GTi Turbo, launched in autumn 1984, rated at 168 PS (124 kW) and a top speed of 220 km/h (137 mph).

- 2.0 L (1985 cc) I4
- 2.0 L (1995 cc) Douvrin I4
- 2.2 L (2165 cc) Douvrin I4
- 2.2 L (2175 cc) I4
- 2.4 L (2347 cc) carburetted I4
- 2.4 L (2347 cc) fuel-injected I4
- 2.5 L (2499 cc) fuel-injected I4
- 2.5 L (2499 cc) fuel-injected I4 with turbocharger
- 2.5 L (2499 cc) fuel-injected I4 with turbocharger and intercooler
- 2.2 L (2175 cc) diesel I4
- 2.5 L (2499 cc) diesel I4 75 PS (55 kW)
- 2.5 L (2499 cc) diesel I4 with turbocharger 95 PS (70 kW)
- 2.5 L (2499 cc) diesel I4 with turbocharger and intercooler 120 PS (88 kW)

== International sales and production ==
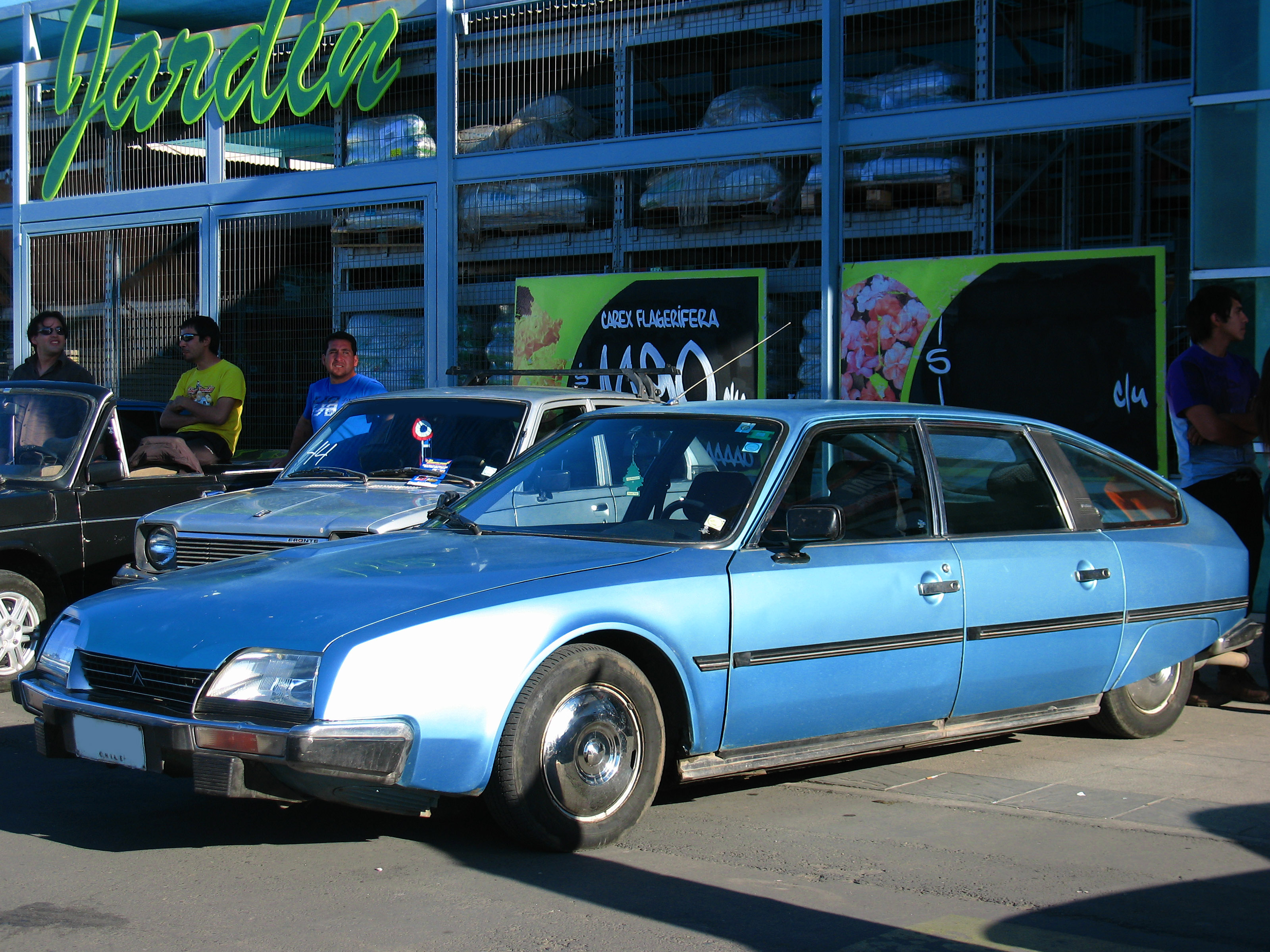
1983 Citroën CX built in Chile

The CX was popular in most European nations, and also sold in some Asian and Latin American countries.

In 1984, Citroën sold 2,500 CXs to China and nearly succeeded in getting the "large car" contract that would have made the CX the most common vehicle in the People's Republic, which only had 20,000 private vehicles at the time. The Chinese government decided to award this contract to the Shanghai Volkswagen joint venture, and instead gave Citroën the rights to the "compact car" segment. This joint venture, located in Wuhan, is today known as the Dongfeng Peugeot-Citroën Automobile factory, producing over 700,000 cars a year. Ironically, Dongfeng Motor rescued the ailing PSA Peugeot Citroën in 2014, with a cash injection in exchange for an interest in the control of PSA.

The CX was assembled in South America from 1978–1984 starting with the CX 2000 Super in Citroën's facility of Arica, Chile. The car achieved good sales numbers despite being one of the most complex cars built in the Americas.

In Australia and South Africa, the CX was imported, unlike the DS, which was assembled locally.

== CX in North America ==
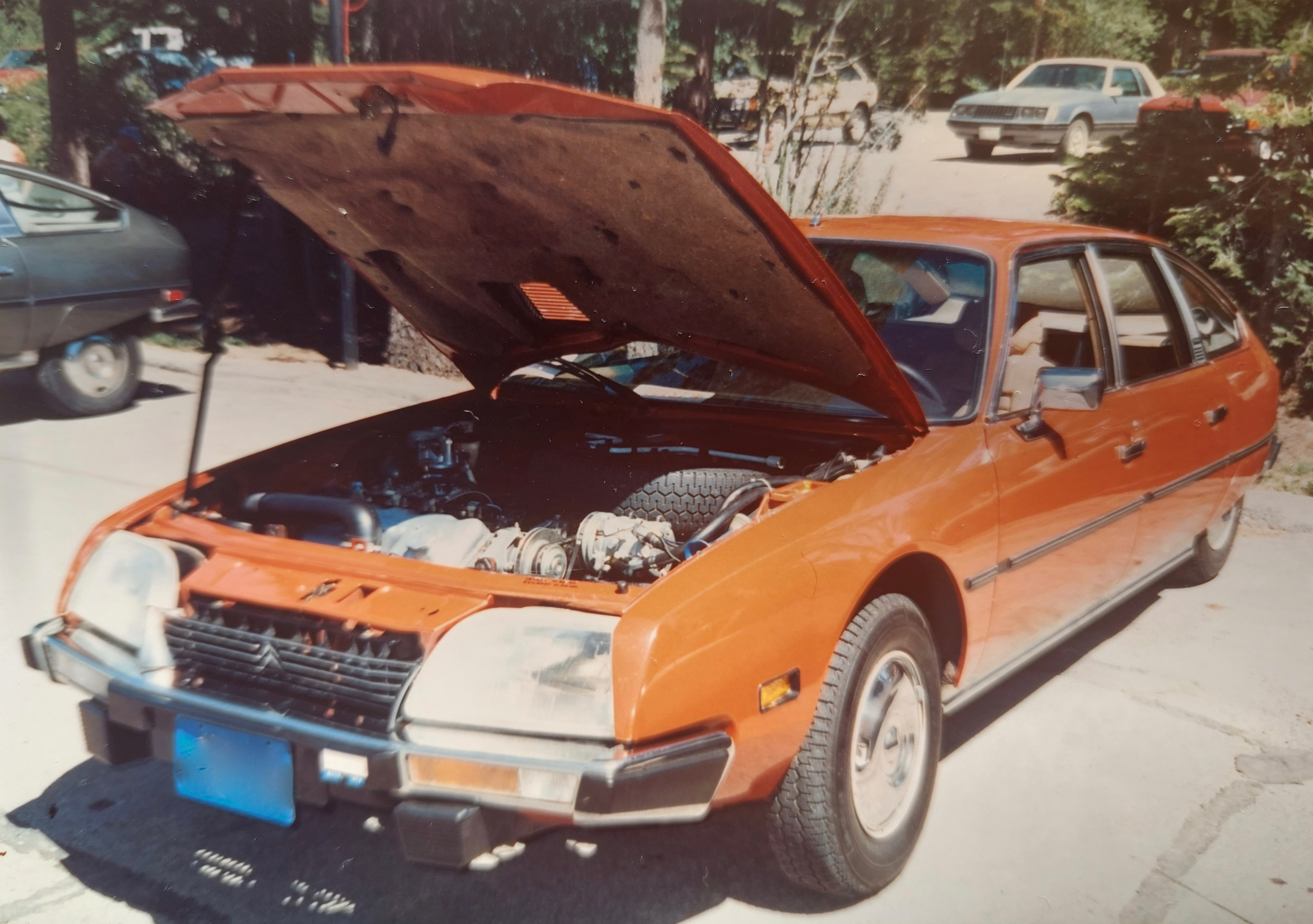
1980 Citroën CX 2500 Diesel Pallas from Trend Imports

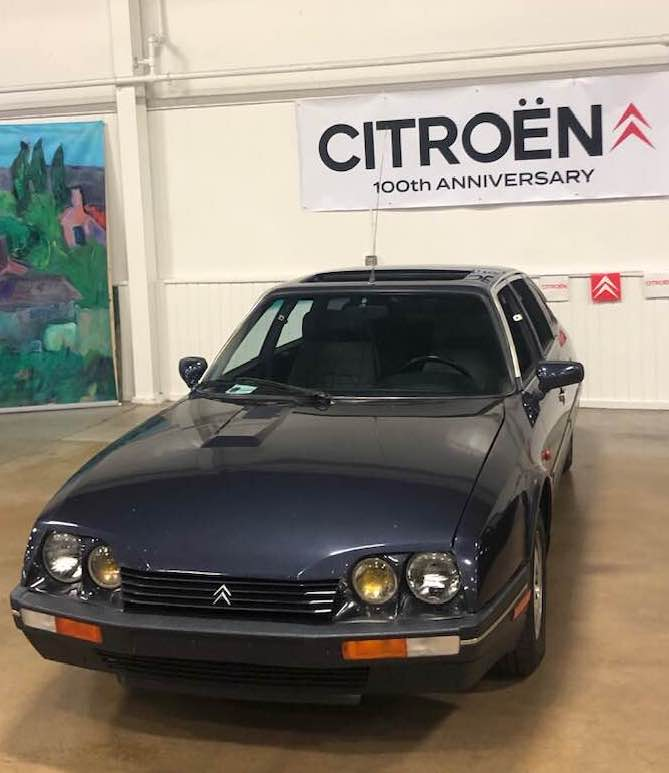
1988 CXA GTi sold new in the United States

PSA Peugeot Citroën had initially engineered the CX models to meet then current US regulations. One specific circumstance led to Citroën’s permanent withdrawal from the US market at the end of 1973, the January 1, 1974 US regulation wording related to 5 mph (8 km/h) bumpers being drafted in such a way that height adjustable suspension was de facto illegal for passenger vehicles. The 1974 Citroëns actually built for the U.S. market could not be supplied to Americans due to the effective date of the bumper regulation.

More specifically, the newly updated US regulations (FMVSS No. 215) mandated 5 mph (8 km/h) bumpers at both ends of passenger vehicles, with the bumper height to be standardized and maintained at a constant height for the 1974 model years - with no distinction for operating ride height, as there was in later EU legislation, since Citroëns are common automobiles in Europe. The height-adjustable suspension was integral to the CX design. Even the Mercedes-Benz Congressional lobby had no impact on this mandate, and they had to disable the height adjustment feature for the US-bound W116 S-Class sedans and S123 estates. In 1981, the standardised bumper height and 5 mph (8 km/h) bumper requirements failed Cost–benefit analysis and were rescinded.

In addition, the situation for Citroën in the North American market was worsened by Citroën’s corporate financial situation and the cost of U.S. and Canadian design legislation. People with Diplomatic immunity are not subject to lawsuit or prosecution under the host country's laws, so diplomats in the U.S. still had access to the CX. So did foreign tourists under the personal use exemption, bringing in the CX for temporary use.

From 1979 on, Americans obtained the CX through grey import specialists, including the firm Trend Imports, who modified them to comply with US regulations.

Beginning in 1983, CxAuto (CXA), based in Lebanon, New Jersey, remanufactured the CX in the Netherlands before exporting them to the United States with full US compliance. The cars were crash tested as required by NHTSA. The bumpers were fitted with shock absorbing elements, the passenger doors were fitted with side impact bars, the form-fitting headlamps were replaced with four round capsule headlamps and fog lamps, the exhaust system was fitted with oxygen sensor and catalyst, and so forth. They offered a 5-year/50,000 mi (80,000 km) warranty and sold the CX cars in 49 states except California (due to stricter emission regulations). CxAuto removed the Citroën and CX badges and double chevron logos and marketed them as the CXA.

The CXA retail price was $39,900 for CX 25 GTi and was $49,800 for CX 25 Prestige, at a time when the similar 1988 Peugeot 505 GLS sedan had an MSRP of $17,775. The higher price was due to the unwillingness of PSA Peugeot Citroën to sell CX at wholesale price and the high cost of engineering and modification work to meet US regulations.

Another specialist, Citroen Importers of North America (CINA), based in Atlanta, Georgia, also imported CX and modified them for US regulations. They received cease-and-desist letters from PSA Peugeot Citroën to stop selling CX cars to Americans. CINA was allowed to sell the remaining CX in stock before terminating the sales permanently.

Despite lack of advertisement, minimal service network, and higher retail price, Trend Imports, individuals on the grey market, CxAuto, and CINA managed to supply Americans with about 1,000 CX units during the 1980s.

== Prominent owners ==
In France, the CX Prestige model was used by the French government, including former president Jacques Chirac, who kept using the CX officially many years after it had left production.

In addition to the 15 converted CX limousines used as state cars between 1978 and 1989 by Erich Honecker, the Citroën CX found use by many other senior SED party officials and government departments of East Germany, with 13 CX Prestige Turbos found to be in the Stasi vehicle fleet.

Elena Ceaușescu, Deputy Prime Minister of Romania (and wife of Romania's Communist dictator Nicolae Ceaușescu), was given a CX Prestige by King Juan Carlos I of Spain, which she used until her execution in 1989.

Rainier III, Prince of Monaco and his wife Grace Kelly owned two CXs, a 1981 CX Reflex D Break and a 1980 CX 2400 Pallas, which were both auctioned in July 2012.

Mário Soares the Prime Minister of Portugal used a CX with the license plate POR, while the CX of Henrik, Prince Consort of Denmark sported the license plate Crown 101.

Henri, Grand Duke of Luxembourg, had a special Landaulet created by Henri Chapron for his 1981 wedding.

Other royal and government figures who drove CXs include Harald V, King of Norway, Panamanian dictator Manuel Noriega, Chilean dictator Augusto Pinochet, Prince Bernhard of The Netherlands, and Prince Alphonse, Duke of Anjou and Cádiz.

Italian investigative journalist Carmine Pecorelli was investigating former prime minister Aldo Moro's 1978 kidnapping and murder, when he himself was shot and killed by an unknown assailant, while driving his CX in Rome, in March 1979.

Prominent owners also include Carlos Santana and Johan Cruyff.

British car journalist Jeremy Clarkson used a white CX Safari converted into a motorhome as part of a challenge on Episode 4 of Series 15 of Top Gear. Clarkson would also use a CX Safari, albeit unmodified, in The Grand Tour special "Carnage à Trois".

== Parts used in other vehicles ==
Common parts from the CX were used in other more exclusive cars. For instance, the rear view mirrors of the "Series 2" CX were found on many—mostly British—sports cars, like the Lotus Esprit, the Jaguar XJ220, the TVR Chimaera and the (French) MVS Venturi. The gearbox of the Citroën CX was used in the Matra Murena.

In 1982, Robert Cumberford built the Cumberford Martinique, an open two seater with engine and transmission from a BMW 733i, and steering and suspension from the CX. Pricing was 60% higher than its closest competitor, from Clénet Coachworks, and only two cars were built. Both still exist, one in France and one in San Diego.

== Timeline ==
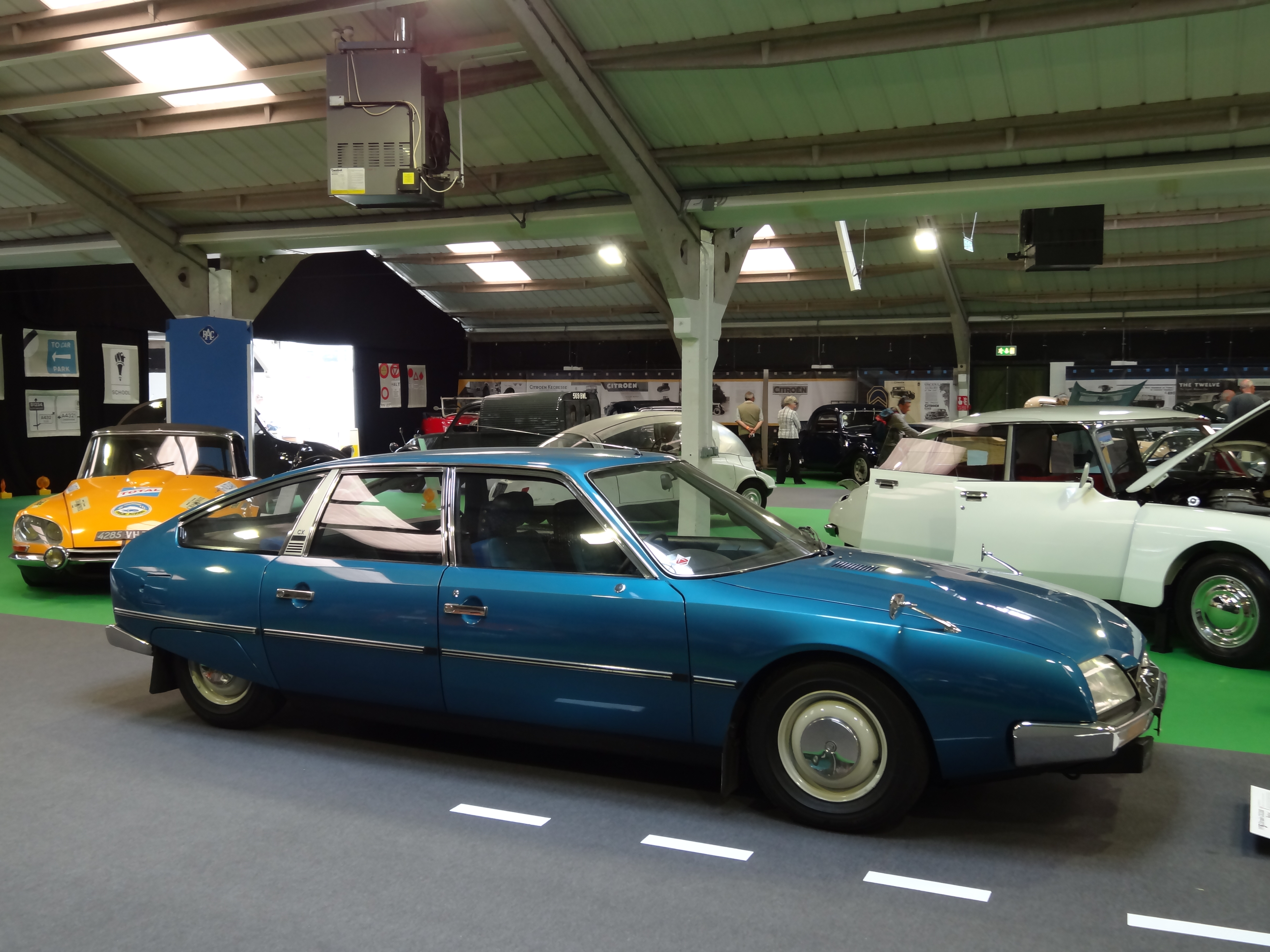
1975 CX 2200 - The oldest continuously registered CX in Britain

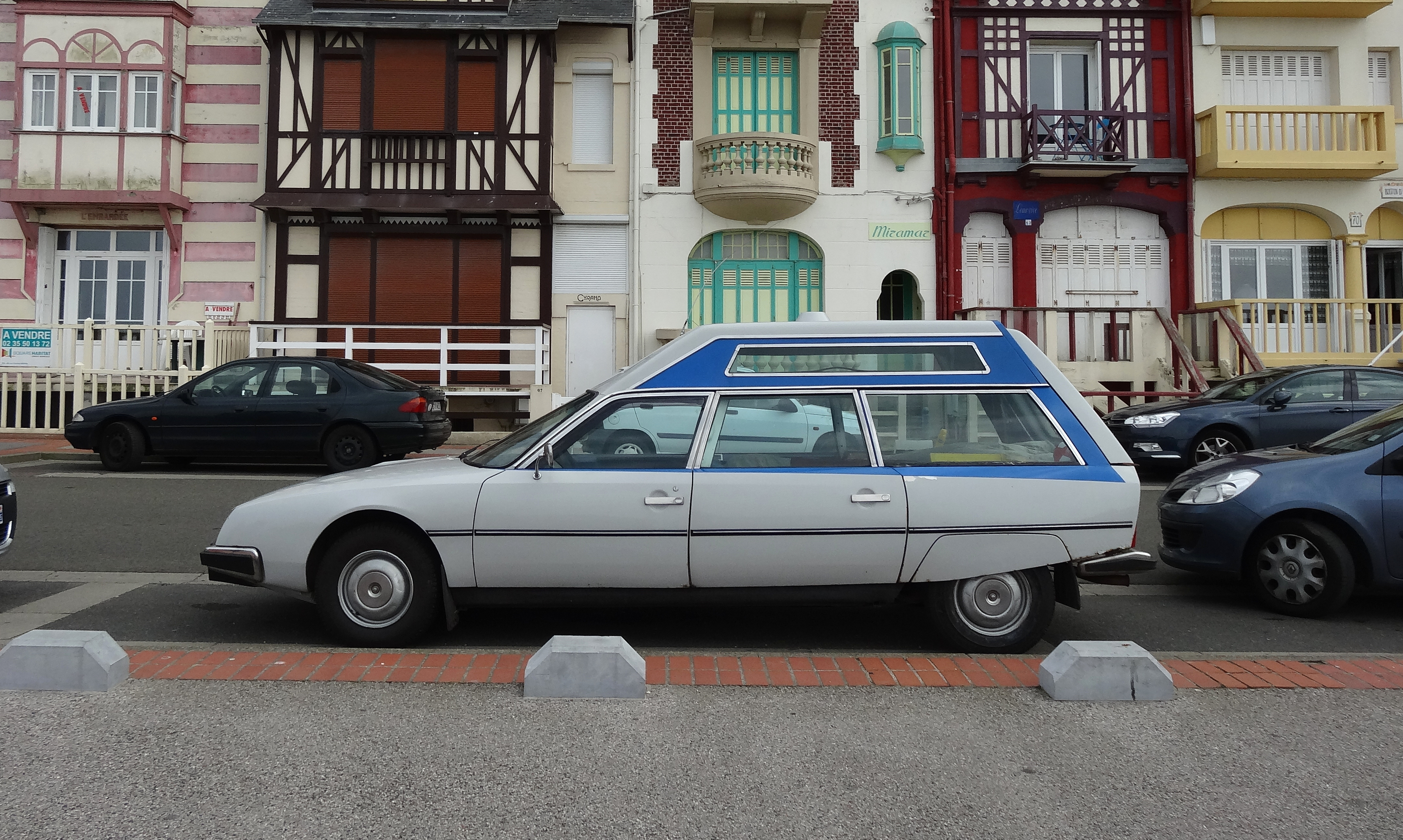
1970's S1 CX Ambulance - Station wagon body shell

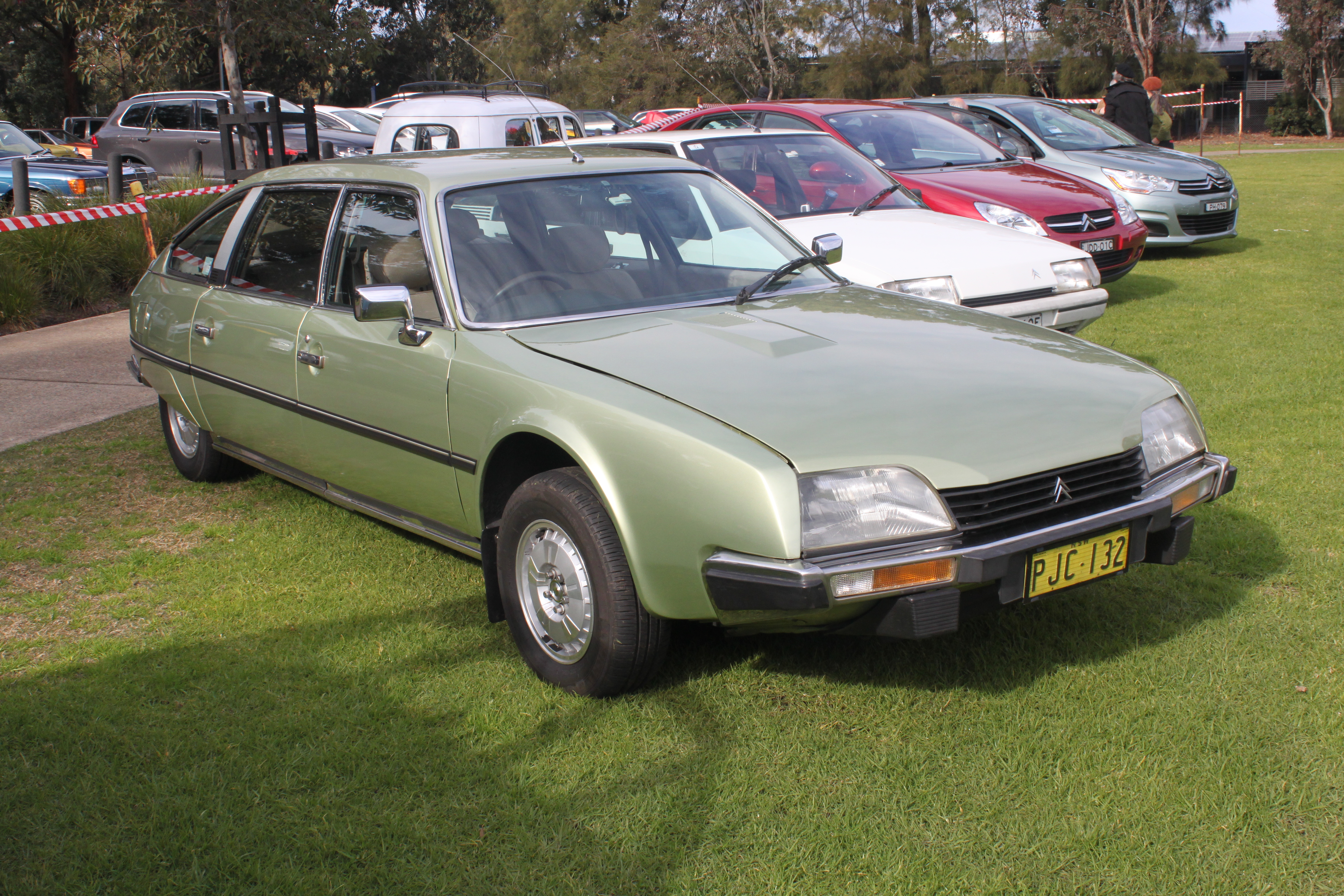
1982 Citroën CX Prestige

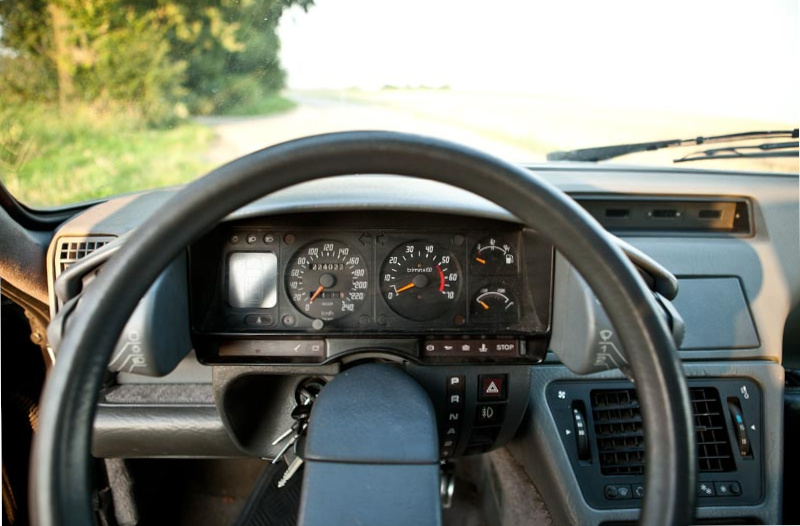
Series 2 dashboard (1986–1991)

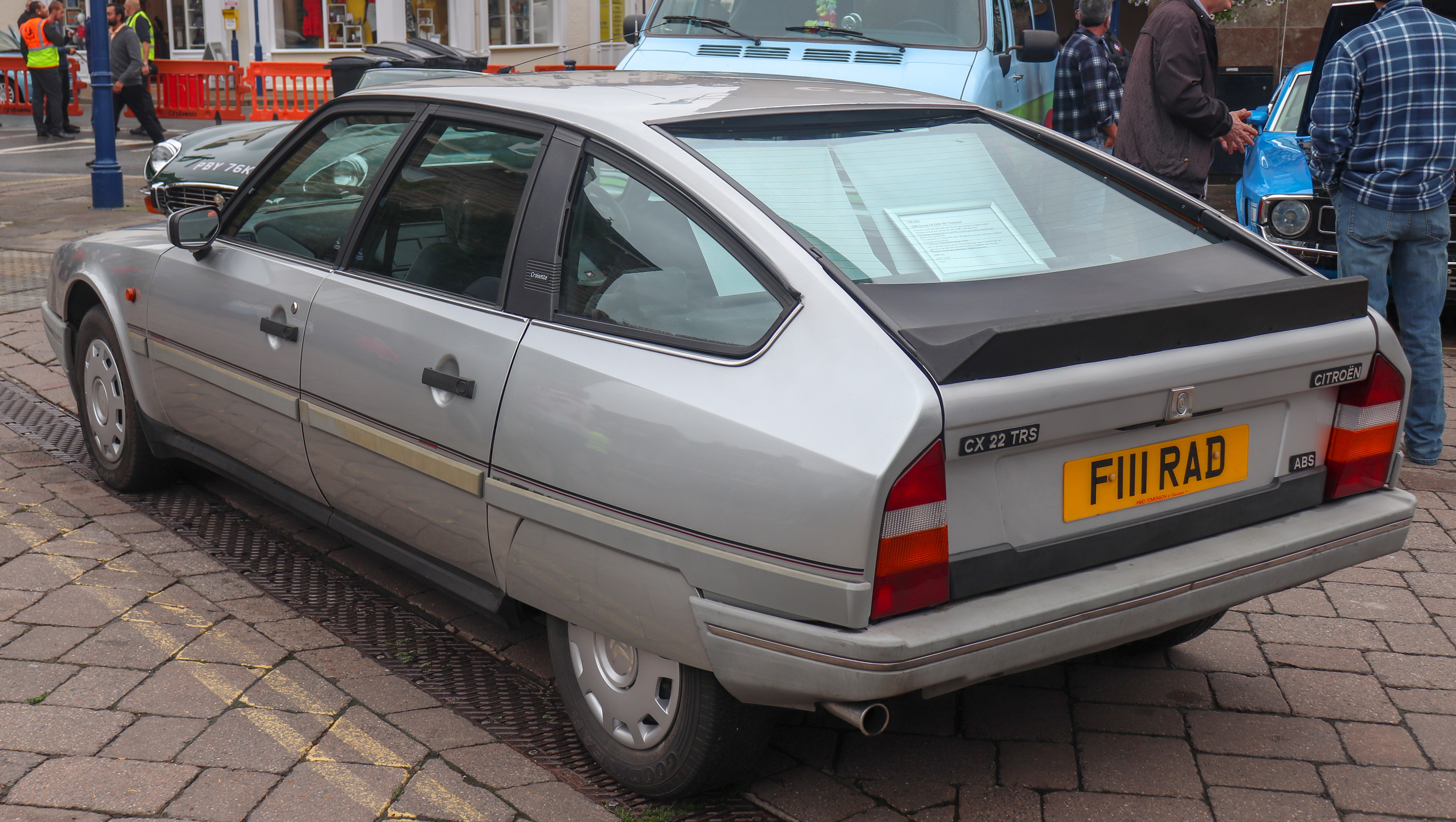
1988 Citroën CX 22 TRS

- 1974: 28 August: Introduction of the 2000 and 2200 fastbacks, with engines inherited from the Citroën DS—positioned between the bottom of range DSuper and the exclusive DS 23 Pallas
- 1975: CX voted 'Car of the Year' by 49 journalists from 14 European countries. July: Introduction of the long-wheelbase saloon, the CX Prestige October: Introduction of the Estate version .
- 1976: January: Introduction of the 2200 Diesel saloon and estate. Semi-automatic "C-Matic" transmission introduced as an option. July: Introduction of CX 2400 Carburettor model. September: Introduction of the CX Ambulance. October: Introduction of the CX Familiale Estate, a 7-seater version. December: The President of France receives a CX with electronic fuel injection, 5-speed gearbox and a raised roof.
- 1977: May: Introduction of the 2400 GTi with fuel injection and the larger motor from the DS 23. July: The CX Prestige receives a raised roofline and fuel injection as well as a 5-speed gearbox. All CX 2400 models are given the optional extra of a 5-speed gearbox. December: Introduction of the CX 2400 Pallas Injection with semi-automatic, C-Matic transmission and vari-power steering as standard.
- 1978: January: Introduction of the CX 2500 Diesel model. July: CX 2500 Diesel saloons and estates have the option of a 5-speed gearbox.
- 1979: July: Introduction of the bottom of range 2000 Reflex and 2000 Athena Saloons, as replacements for the previous 2000 Super and 2000 Confort Saloons. Reflex and Athena have the new 1995 cc Douvrin engine shared with the Renault 20 TS, with a 4-speed gearbox on Reflex and a 5-speed on the Athena. November: Introduction of the CX 2500 Diesel Limousine, which combines the CX Prestige bodywork and the engine and transmission of the CX 2500 Diesels.
- 1980: July: The CX 2400 engine receives power and torque performance increase. 5-speed gearboxes are standard fitting on the Athena, CX Diesel, Super, and Pallas. New gearbox ratios for the CX Break, GTi and Prestige. Rear aerodynamic spoiler fitted to the CX GTi.
- 1981: Automatic transmission made by ZF Friedrichshafen AG replaces C-Matic as an option - available on CX Pallas and Prestige models (both carburettor and injection). Wider front track introduced throughout the range to accommodate the ZF automatic. Introduction of the 2000 Reflex Safari, 2000 Reflex Familiale, 2400 Reflex Safari and 2400 Reflex Familiale Estates. July: Cruise control offered as option on the CX Pallas (5-speed manual and automatic), CX Prestige automatic and CX GTi.
- 1982: New enlarged front wheel arches are introduced throughout the range to match the wider front track introduced 6 months earlier and allow for the fitment of wider Michelin TRX tyres. Michelin TRX tyres are standard on the CX GTi and optional on the fuel injected Pallas and Prestige models.
- 1983: CX Reflex becomes CX20, CX Reflex D becomes CX 25D, CX Reflex IE becomes CX IE, CX Athena became CX 20 Pallas.
- 1983: July gasoline 2400 (2347ccm) engine replaced with 2500 (2499ccm) engine.
- 1984: March: Introduction of the CX Entreprise models, the CX 20 Entreprise and the CX 25D Entreprise, having only front seats fitted and the rear lined for carrying loads and targeted towards businesses. April: The limited edition CX 20 Leader is launched. 700 examples are produced and the model has the same technical characteristics to the 5-speed CX 20. October: The CX 25 GTi Turbo is introduced—the first genuinely fast CX model.
- 1985: March: ABS braking becomes optional on the CX 25 GTi Turbo. July: Introduction of the model year 1986 S2 (Series 2) CX, restyled in appearance. Plastic bumpers, a completely revised interior, new mirrors, and protective body strips are among the most obvious changes. The new Series 2 model CX 22 TRS (2,165 ccm aluminum Douvrin engine) in addition to entry level CX 20 sedan.
- 1986: Introduction of the gasoline models 25 GTi Turbo 2 and Prestige Turbo 2, with new Intercooler and improved performance. All Turbo models are 5 speed manual.
- 1989: CX production at the Aulnay-sous-Bois factory ceased. All saloon models discontinued. Heuliez, famous French coachbuilders, were given the contract for continuing to produce CX estate models. Introduction of the rebadged 25 TGI Familiale estate, formerly the TRI.
- 1990: Introduction of the 22 TGE Safari, 25 TGI Safari, and 25 TGD Safari Turbo Diesel estates.
- 1991: Last estate models discontinued.

== Legacy ==
Citroën CX values strongly reflect condition, as befits a high volume car with complex components. Value was bolstered in 2015, when one of the Erich Honecker CX's, a 1984 CX 2500 Injection Prestige, was sold for EUR €95,360 (US$108,621) at Artcurial. In 2018, another CX, Landaulet by Chapron, sold for EUR 95,360 as well.

The most collectible CX models are the very rare Series 1 GTi Turbo, and the Series 2 Prestige Turbo.
