= Mark Lloyd (car designer) =

British car designer

Mark Lloyd is a British car designer, employed at Citroën's Centre de Creation as Programme Director. He was awarded the Sturmey award for innovation by Autocar magazine in 2015.

== Education ==
Lloyd graduated from University of Cambridge, and then went to Royal College of Art for Transport Design then and Imperial College for Industrial Design Engineering.

== Career ==
Lloyds started his career at Jaguar where he worked for three years including on the XJ220, and then joined PSA Group in 1989 as an exterior designer. He then moved to Head of concept cars in 1999 and designed C6 Lignage, Osmose, C-Crosser, C-Airdream, C-Airlounge, C-Airplay and the C-Sportlounge.

He became head of the design team in 2005 and was appointed Range Manager for future programmes of the Citroën marque in 2009 and more recently became programme director of Citroën's Centre de Creation in Paris and was responsible for the DS 3.

=== Production designs ===
- Citroën Xsara Picasso (exterior)
- Citroën C4 Cactus
- DS 3
