= Madrid Motor Show =

Biennial motor show held at Feria de Madrid, Spain

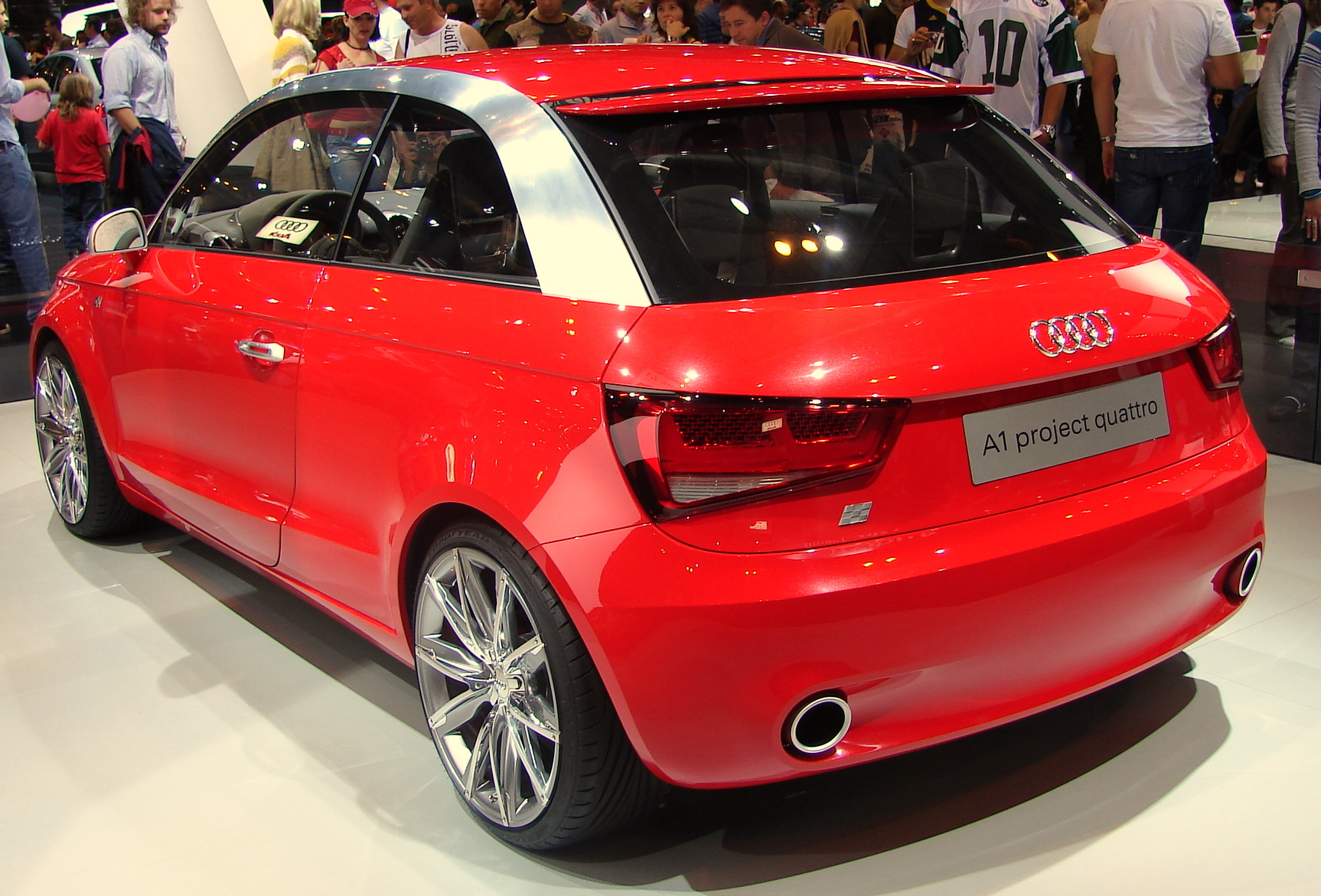
Audi A1 at the Madrid Motor Show

The Madrid International Auto Show (Salón Internacional del Automóvil de Madrid in Spanish) is a motor show held biennially (on even years) in May at Feria de Madrid, Spain, which alternates with the Barcelona Motor Show. It is not recognized as a major international show by the Organisation Internationale des Constructeurs d'Automobiles.

== 2012 ==
Running from 25 May to 3 June, the 2012 show only attracted eight marques to formally display their models.

== 2010 ==
The 2010 show opened 20 May. It included the display of the new Tesla Model S. SEAT displayed their IBE concept car, which had been previously shown at the Geneva Motor Show.

== 2006 ==
The 2006 show ran from 26 May to 4 June.

Introductions:

- Citroën C-Buggy concept
- Citroën Jumper minivan
- Citroën C-Triomphe (2008 C4 sedan preview)
- Kia Carens
- Toyota Avensis facelift

== 2008 ==
Alternative propulsion prototypes:

- Citroën C-Cactus
- Nissan Denki Cube
- Volvo C30 ReCharge
