= Citroën C-Airplay =

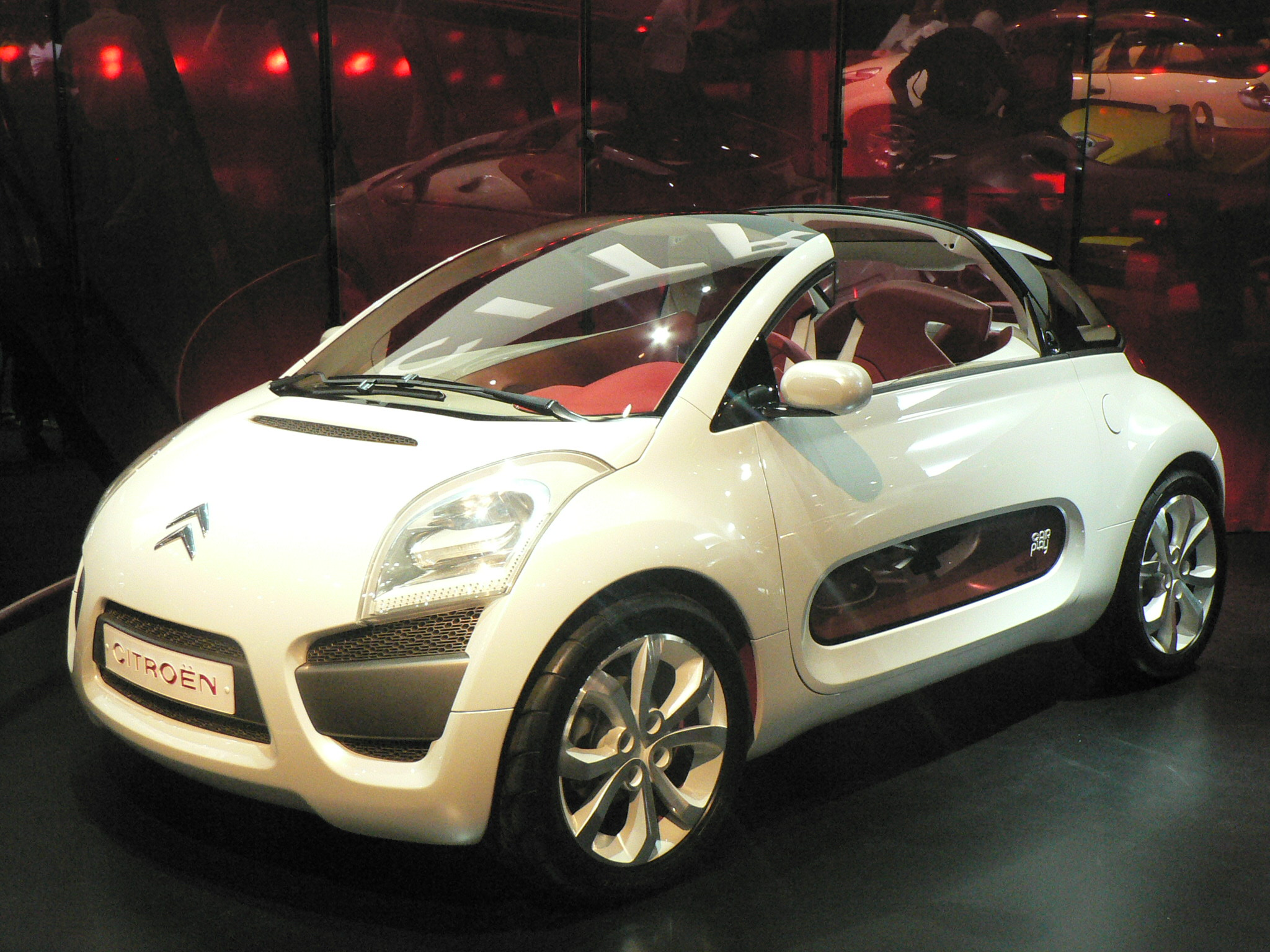
- C Airplay (2006 Paris Motor Show)

Overview
- Manufacturer: Citroën
- Production: Concept car only
- Designer: Cyril Pietton (exterior); Christophe Cayrol (interior)

Body and chassis
- Class: City car
- Body style: 3-door hatchback
- Layout: Front Engine front wheel drive
- Related: Citroën C-Buggy

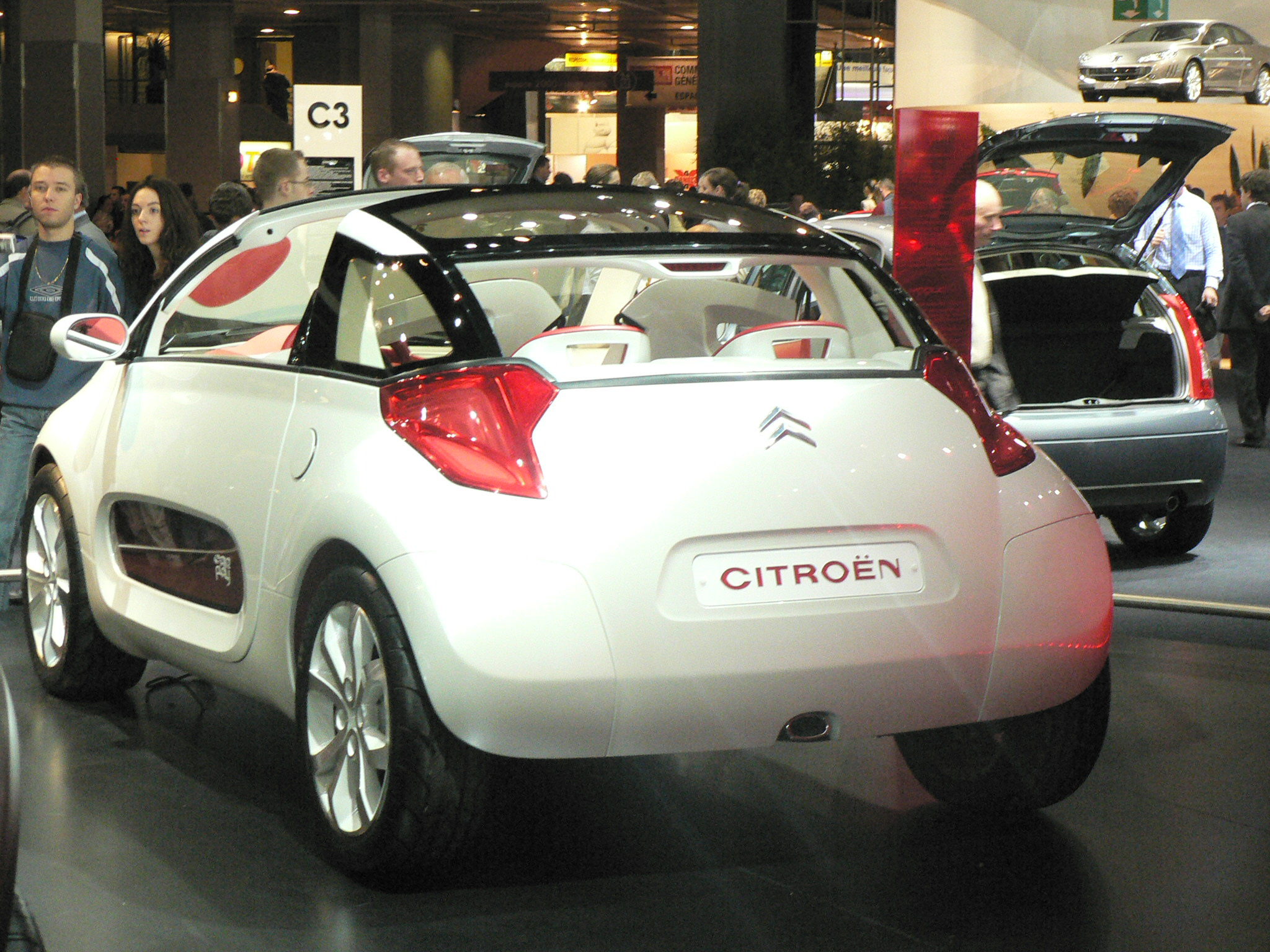
Rear view

The Citroën C-Airplay is a concept car designed by Citroën and unveiled at the 2005 Bologna Motor Show. The car was also shown at the 2006 British International Motor Show.

== Overview ==
The vehicle is a three-door, four-seater city car with a slightly rounded body shape similar to that of the Fiat 500. A feature of the design was the tinted glass inserted in the lower half of the doors. The car was similar to the Citroën C-Buggy.
