= Citroën C-Buggy =

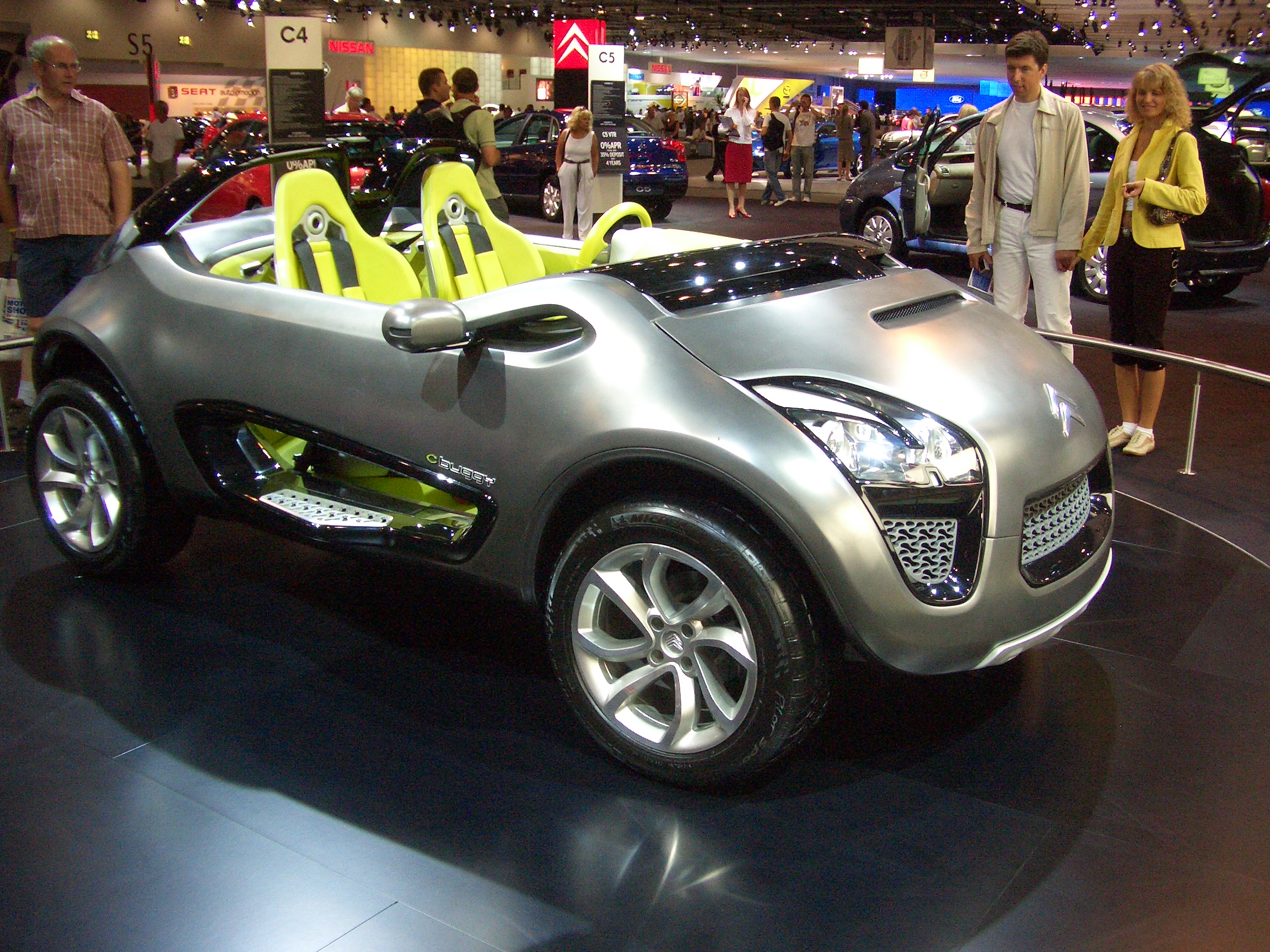
- Citroën C-Buggy at the 2006 British International Motor Show

Overview
- Manufacturer: Citroën
- Production: 2006

Body and chassis
- Class: Concept car
- Body style: City car

The Citroën C-Buggy was a concept car initially presented by Citroën at the 2006 editions of the Madrid Motor Show and the British International Motor Show.

It was a two-seater city car with styling influences from both dune buggy and sport utility vehicle. It was made with some protection against off-road grievances, such as having a slightly raised suspension and also including sump guards. It had tinted glass inserts in the lower body side panels and no doors.
