= Citroën C4 Cactus =

Subcompact crossover SUV

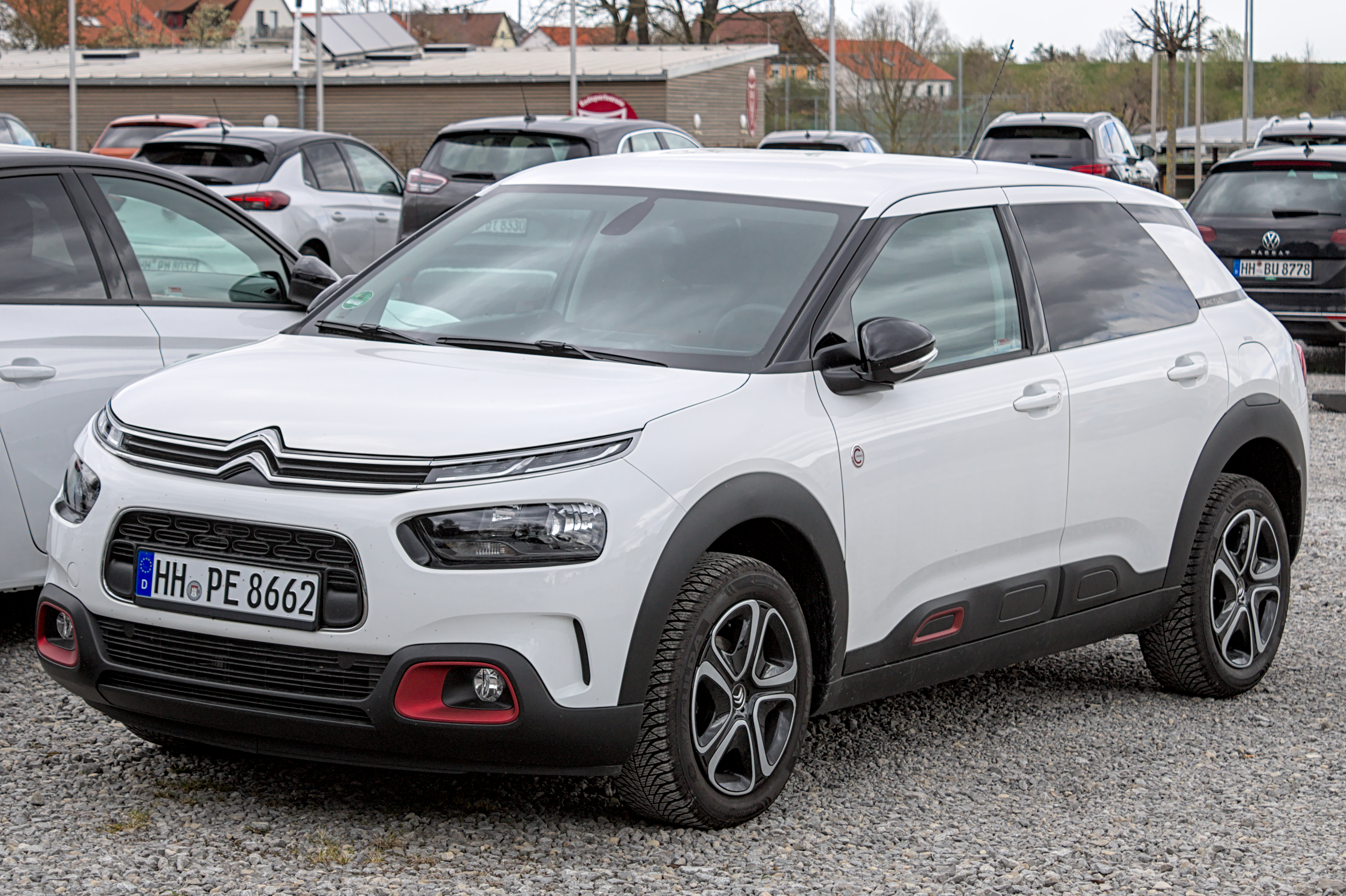

Overview
- Manufacturer: Citroën (Note: PSA Group (2014–2021); Stellantis (2021–2024))
- Production: April 2014 – May 2020 (Spain); 2018–2024 (Brazil)
- Assembly: Spain: Villaverde, Madrid; Brazil: Porto Real

Body and chassis
- Class: Subcompact crossover SUV
- Body style: 5-door SUV
- Layout: Front-engine, front-wheel-drive
- Platform: PSA PF1 platform
- Related: Citroën C3; DS 3 Peugeot 208; Opel Crossland

Powertrain
- Engine: 1.2 L PSA EB2 Puretech I3 (petrol); 1.6 L HDi 16V I4 (diesel) 1.6 Prince EP6 I4 (Flex Fuel) 1.6 Prince EP6 I4 (Flex Fuel)

Dimensions
- Wheelbase: 2,595 mm (102.2 in)
- Length: 4,157 mm (163.7 in)
- Width: 1,729 mm (68.1 in)
- Height: 1,481 mm (58.3 in) (International); 1,563 mm (61.5 in) (Latin American model)
- Curb weight: 965 kg (2,127 lb) - 1,070 kg (2,360 lb)

Chronology
- Predecessor: Citroën C4 (2010); Citroën C4 Aircross (2012)
- Successor: Citroën C3 Aircross; Citroën C4 (2020)

The Citroën C4 Cactus is a subcompact crossover SUV, produced by French automaker Citroën in Spain between April 2014 and December 2017, with production of the second generation commencing in October 2017 (until May 2020 in Villaverde), with the final months of production being disrupted by the COVID-19 pandemic. The C4 Cactus is considered a compact SUV, although it is based on the PSA PF1 platform that underpins the smaller Citroën C3 and DS3.

A distinctive design feature is the "AirBump" panels on the car's sides, designed to protect the vehicle from damage in car parks. The Citroën Cactus Concept, presented at the 2013 Frankfurt Motor Show, previewed the production version. The C4 Cactus was presented at the 2014 Geneva Motor Show.

== Overview ==
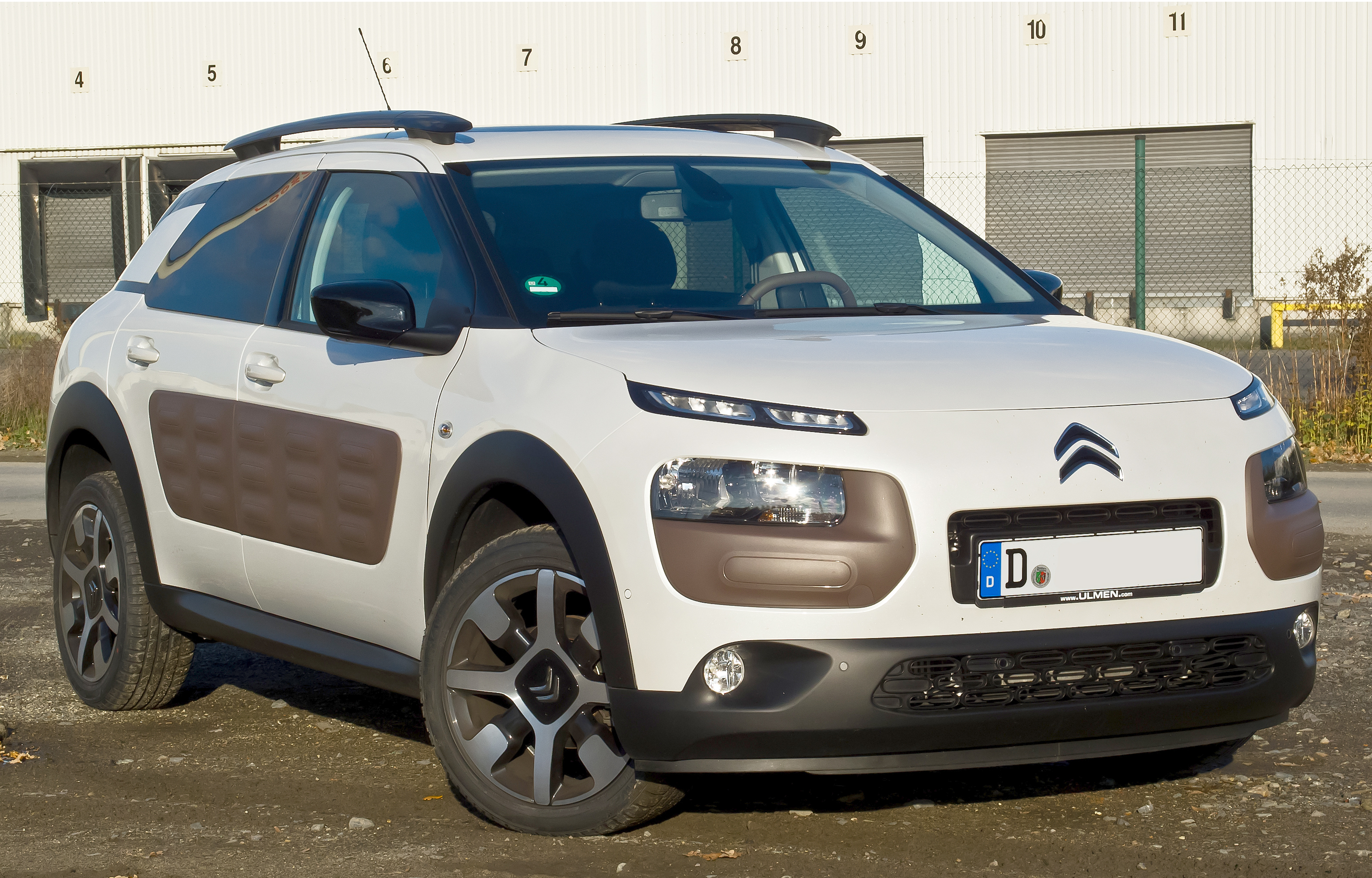

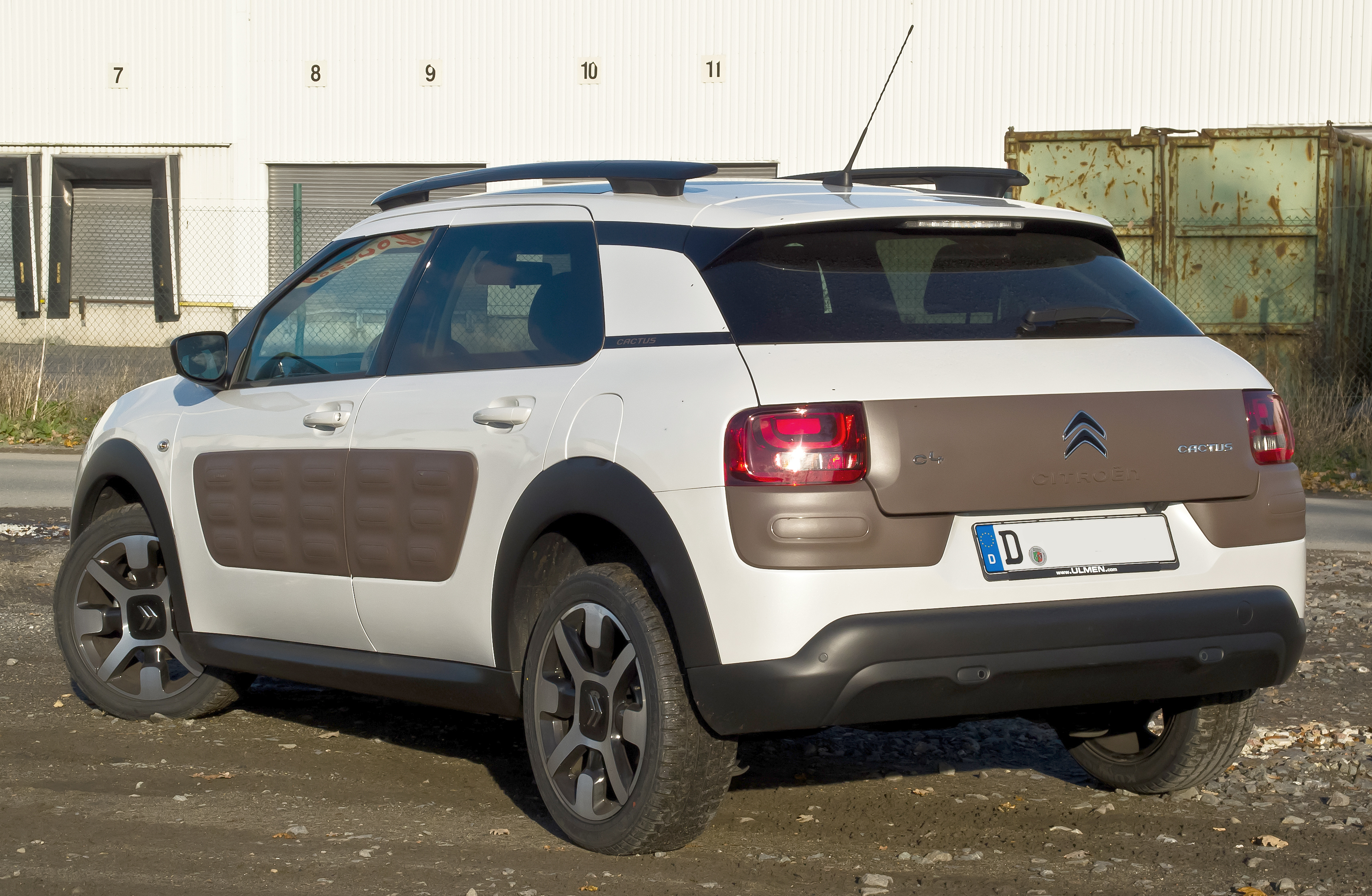
Pre-facelift

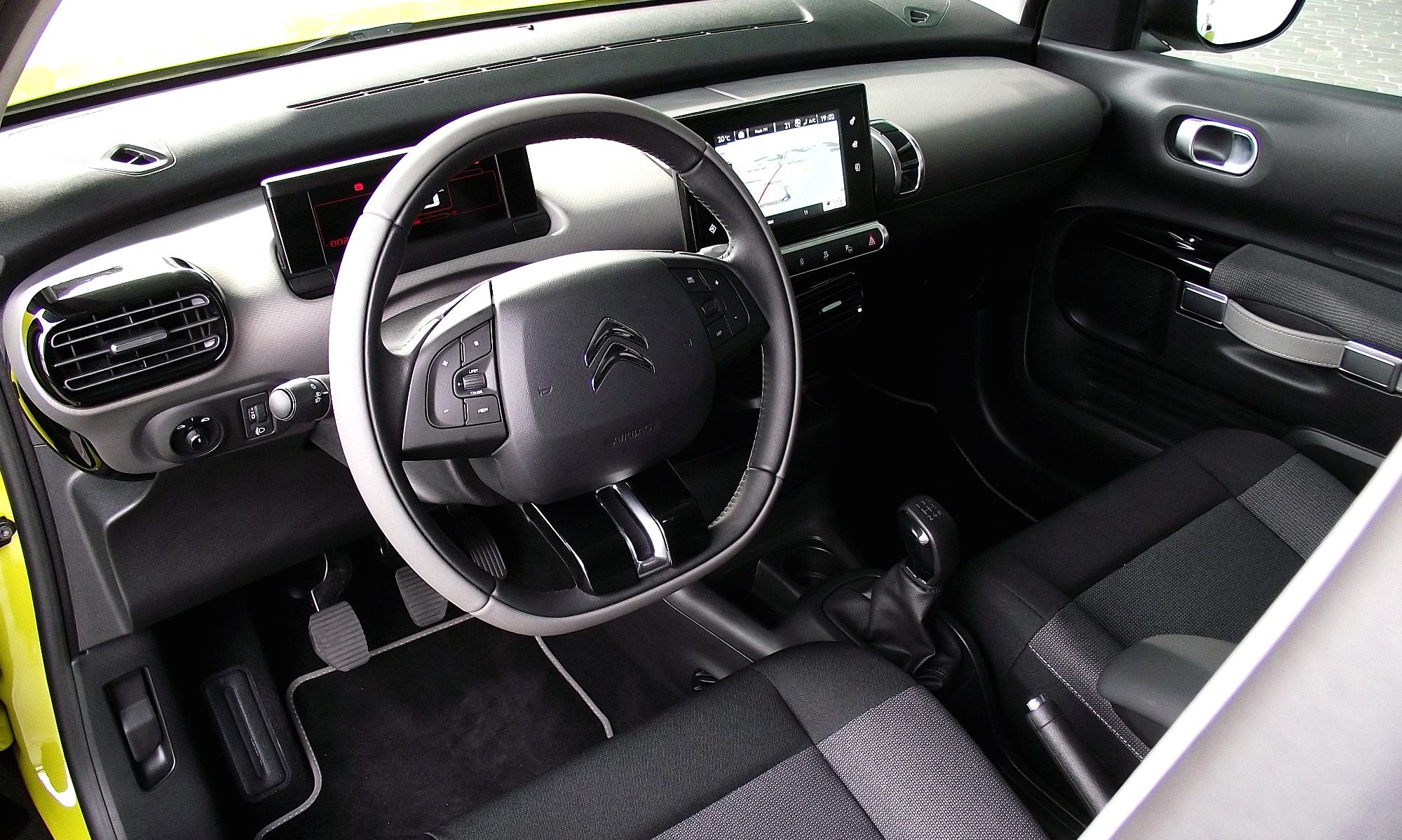
Interior

Production started in April 2014 at PSA's factory in Villaverde, Madrid. Sales commenced in France in June 2014. It is a five-door SUV in Touch, Feel and Flair trim levels, and is powered by 1.2 L inline-three petrol engines and 1.6 L inline-four diesel engines.

An estate C4 Cactus was programmed (codename: E32), but Citroën eventually abandoned the project.

In 2016, three more trim levels were added to the C4 Cactus range: Flair Edition, Rip Curl and W. Slow sales of the W led to the model being dropped from the line up.

In October 2016, production of the vivid paint colour Lagoon Blue ceased, and was replaced by a new colour Baltic Blue, which is more subtle. A rich, dark red called Jelly Red, was added to the range of colours available. In May 2017, the popular Shark Grey ceased in favour of Platinum Grey, which is slightly darker and used on the DS4 and the 2016 Dispatch van. In Italy, the W is called the Total White edition; there is also a Total Black edition and these models are called OneTone in some markets. Although 30% of Cactus sales in the United Kingdom were black cars with black Airbumps, the Total Black model was not offered in the United Kingdom; it could be configured but black gloss wheels would be needed to conform to the standard.

The Cactus is sold in Australia, New Zealand, Hong Kong, South Africa and South America, and so it is a 'world car' in that respect. The Cactus was tested by Euro NCAP, and scored highly in the pedestrian safety test, the best in its class, due to the car's curved shape at the front. This achievement is matched by few other cars tested. Cactus was the first passenger car to have the front passenger's front facing air bag mounted in the roof lining, which also allowed the glove-box to be larger than most competitors.

The Rip Curl is a collaboration with the surfing brand of the same name and is marketed as a more adventure based vehicle, with its 'Grip Control' feature meaning the driver can adjust the car to driving on either tarmac, snow, mud or ice.

This works by the ECU adjusting the power delivery to each of the front wheels independently, based on whichever wheel has more grip at any one moment. Aside from four-season Goodyear tyres, all other changes are purely aesthetic, with 'Rip Curl' graphics and orange seat belts amongst the differences.

The W trim is an all white model, with a Pearl White body colour, plus white door mirrors, door handles, roof bars and alloy wheels.

=== Facelift (2018) ===
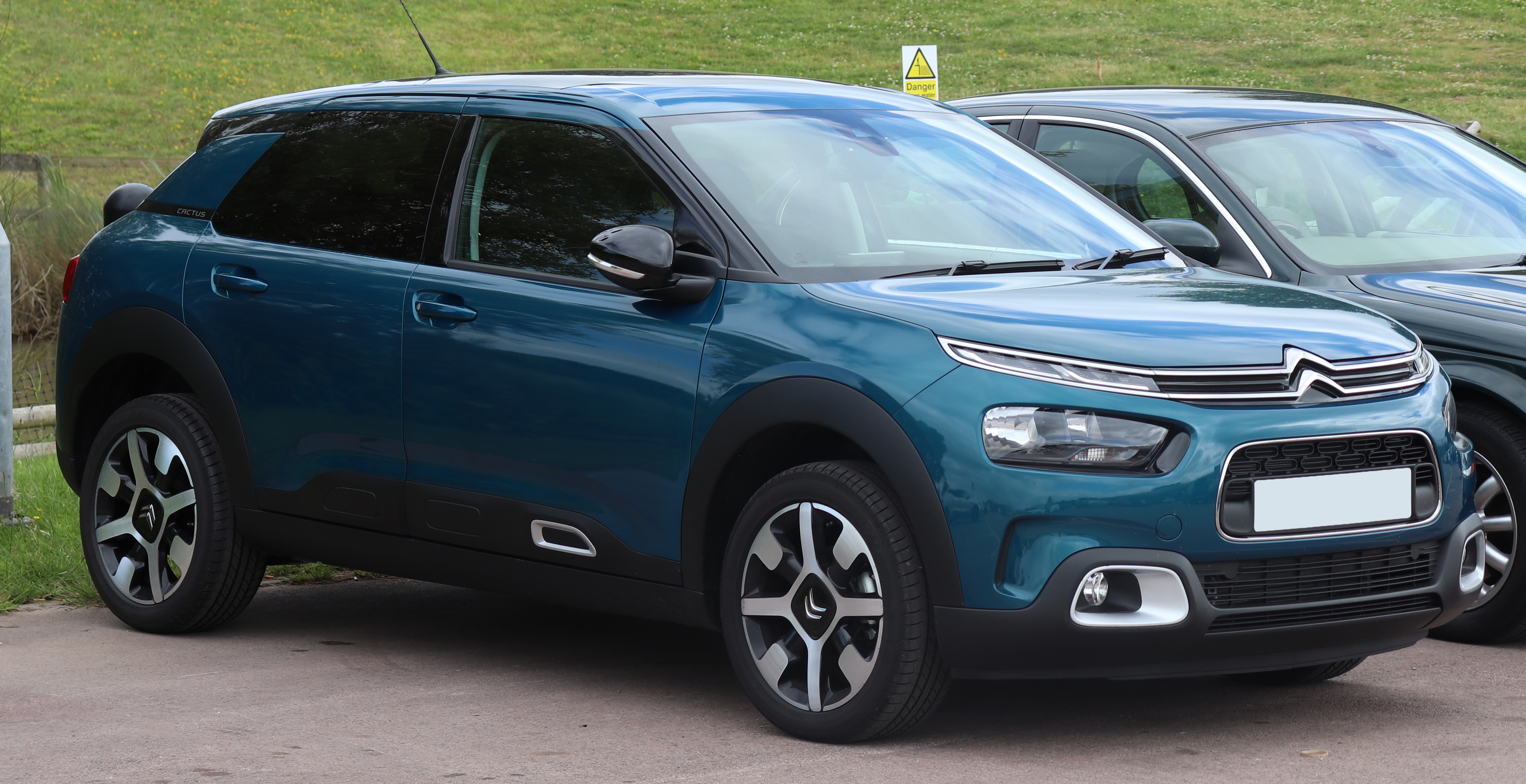

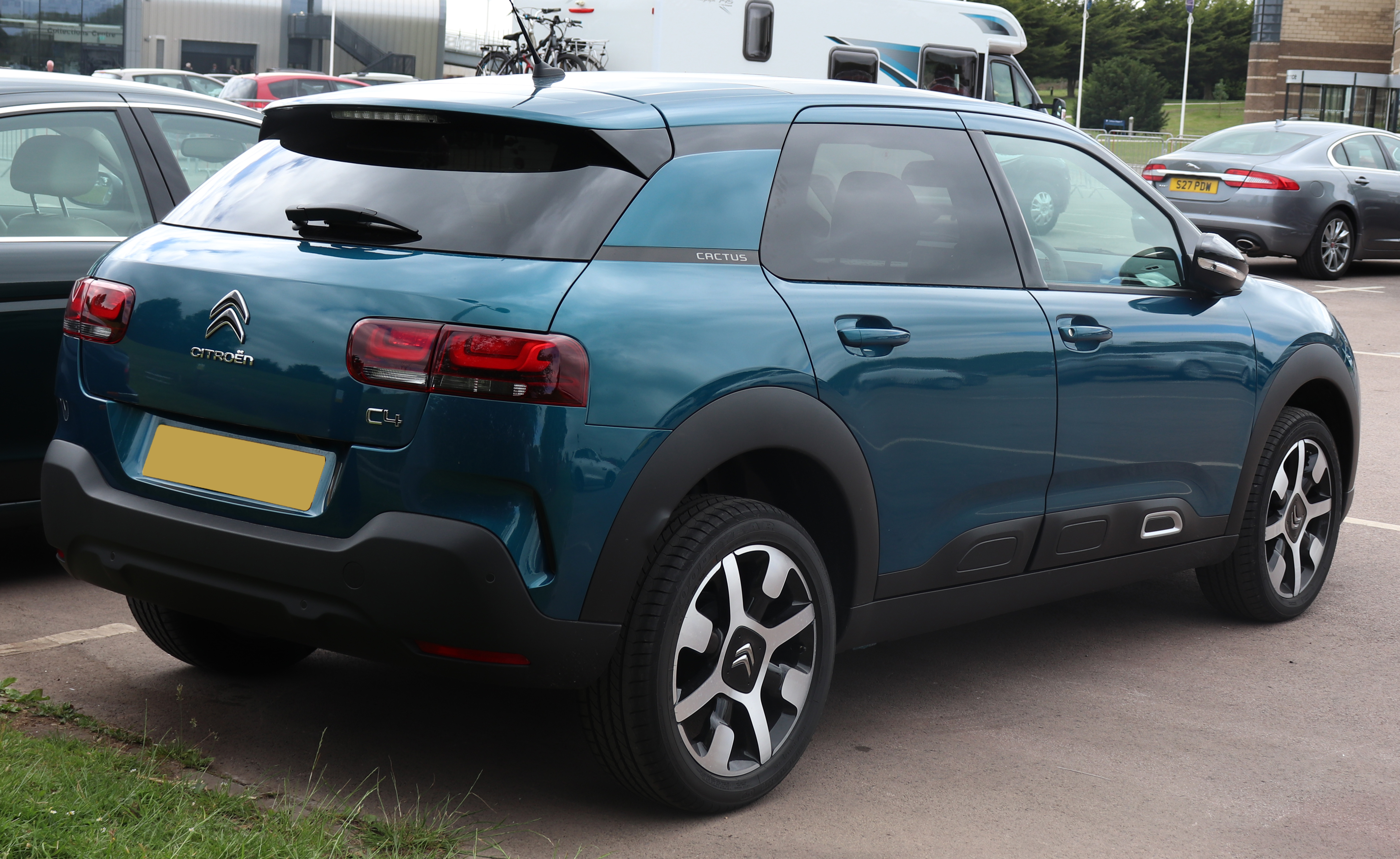
2018 facelift (European model)

Citroën presented a revised C4 Cactus for the model year of 2018. The facelifted Cactus has had a major technological upgrade, including emergency brake assist, lane departure warning system, traffic signage recognition, blindspot monitoring, and automated parking. With the C4 Cactus is being marketed as a hatchback (and no longer as a SUV), while the signature "Airbumps" were retained but made less obtrusive.

== Brazilian model ==
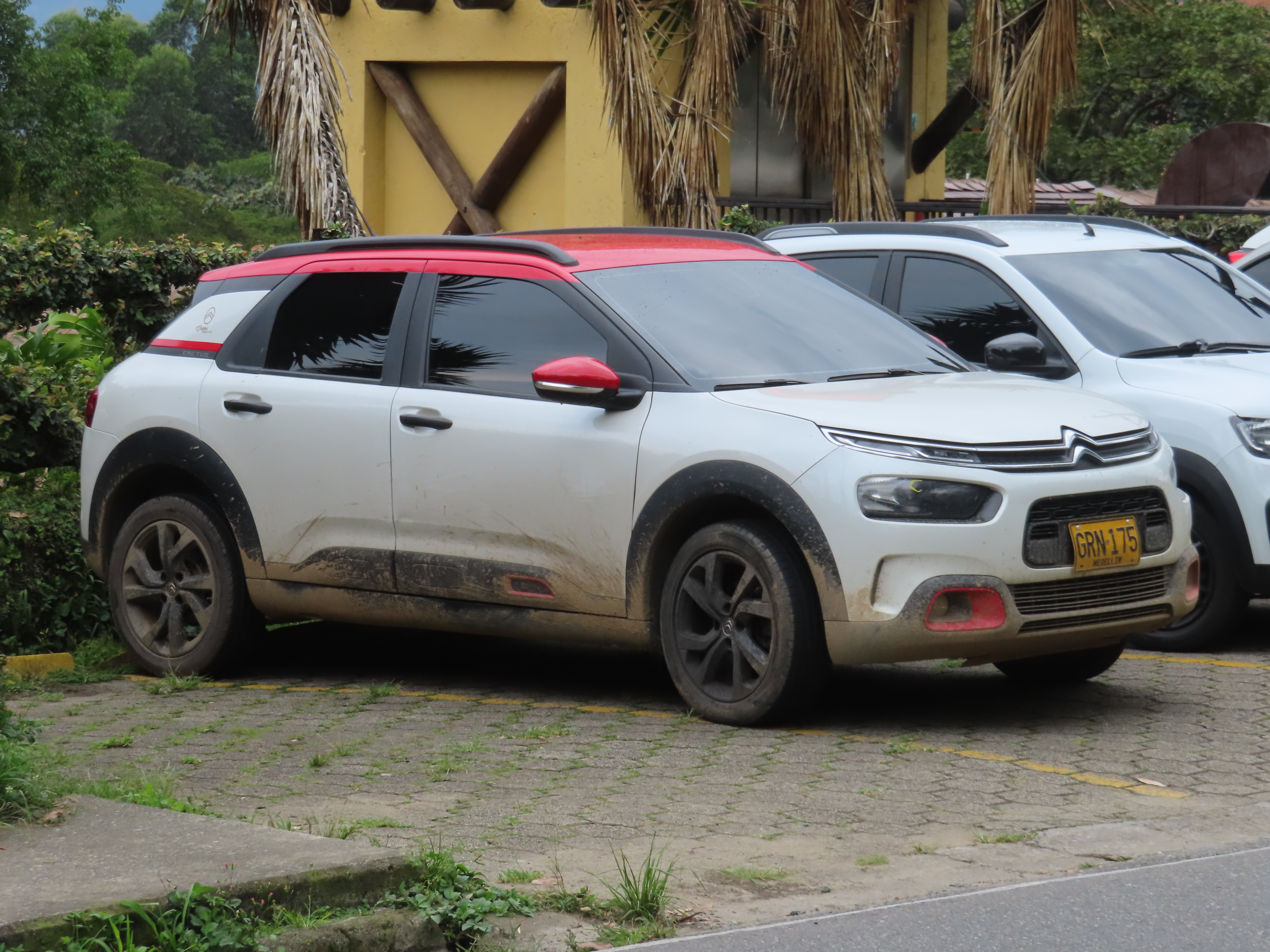
Brazilian model

The European C4 Cactus was exported to selected countries in South America before its facelift.

Until mid-2018, the C4 Cactus sold in Latin America were exported from Villaverde, Spain. In 2018, Citroën launches a local version of the facelifted C4 Cactus, produced in Porto Real, Brazil. It differs from the one produced in Madrid in many ways: it kept its roof bars, has a higher ground clearance and benefits from conventional side rear windows that roll down into the doors.

Unlike the European market, it is marketed there as a small SUV. It quickly became Citroën's best-seller in Brazil and Argentina. After European model discontinuation, Citroën continued to produce the C4 Cactus in Brazil and to export it to Mercosur countries (as well as other Latin America countries such as Colombia, Costa Rica and Peru).

It has gotten a minor update in July 2023, with the main feature being the introduction of the Citroën C3 CC21 10" infotainment system.

== Concept cars ==
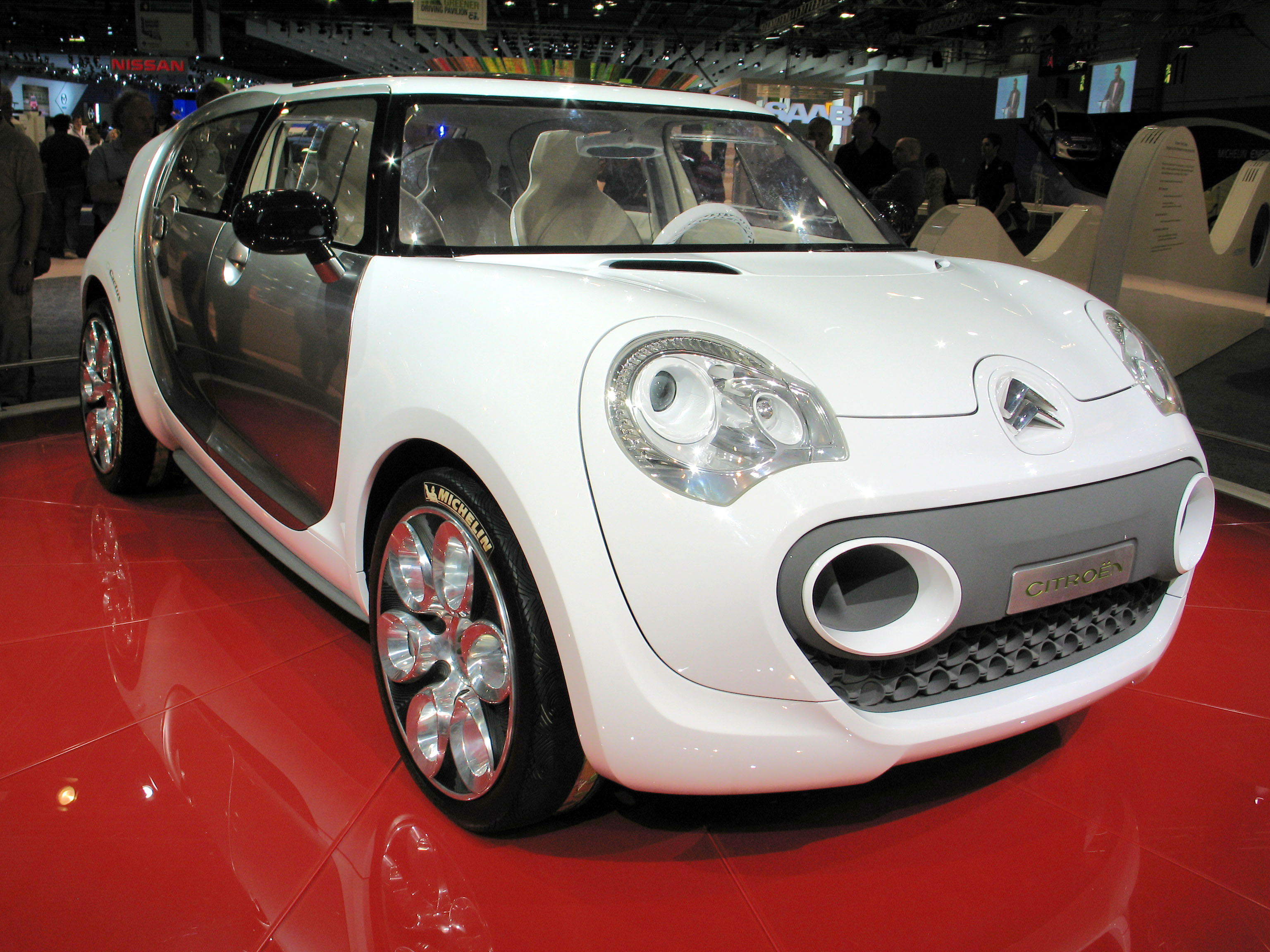
Citroën C-Cactus (2007)

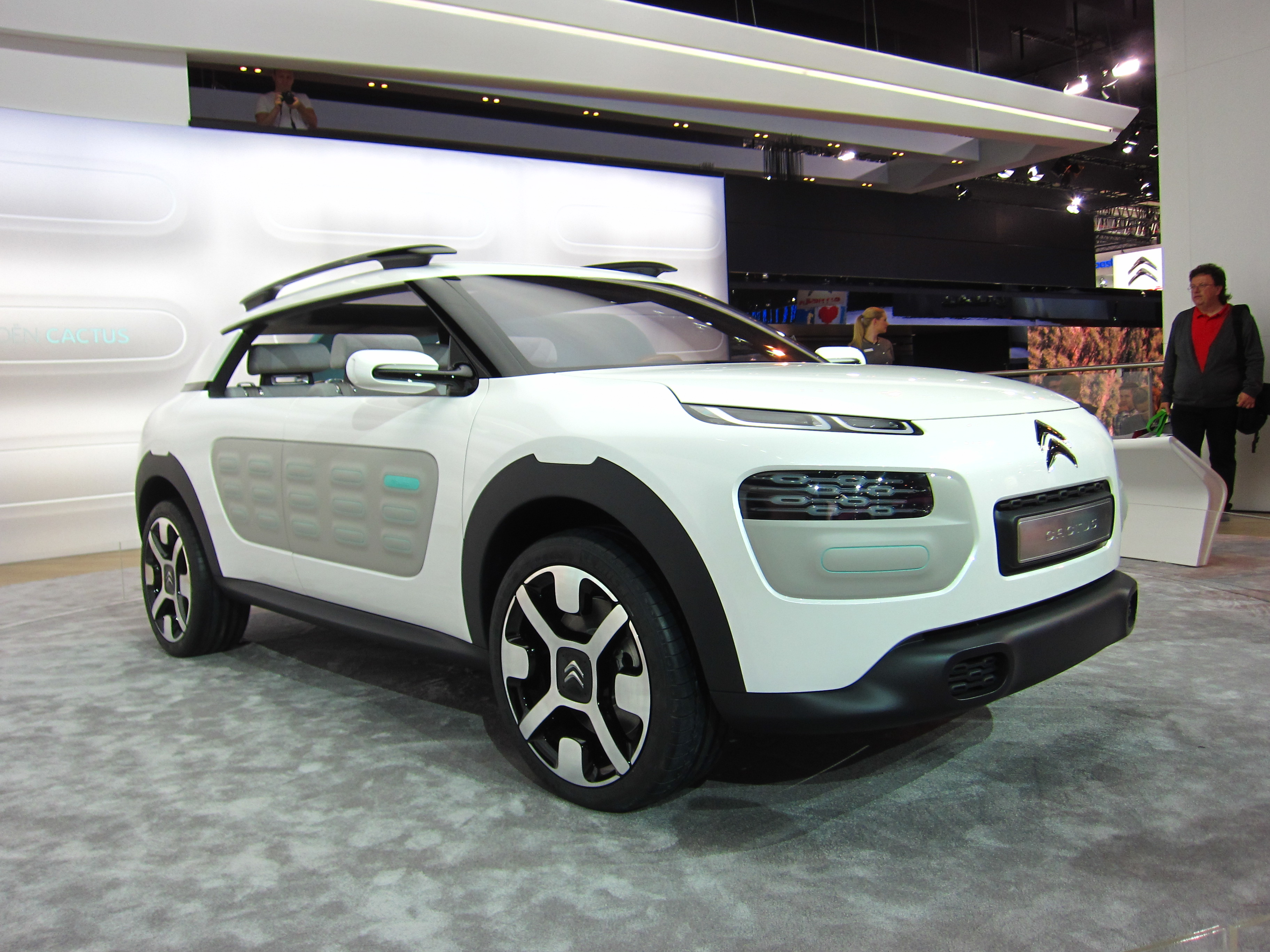
Citroën Cactus (2013)

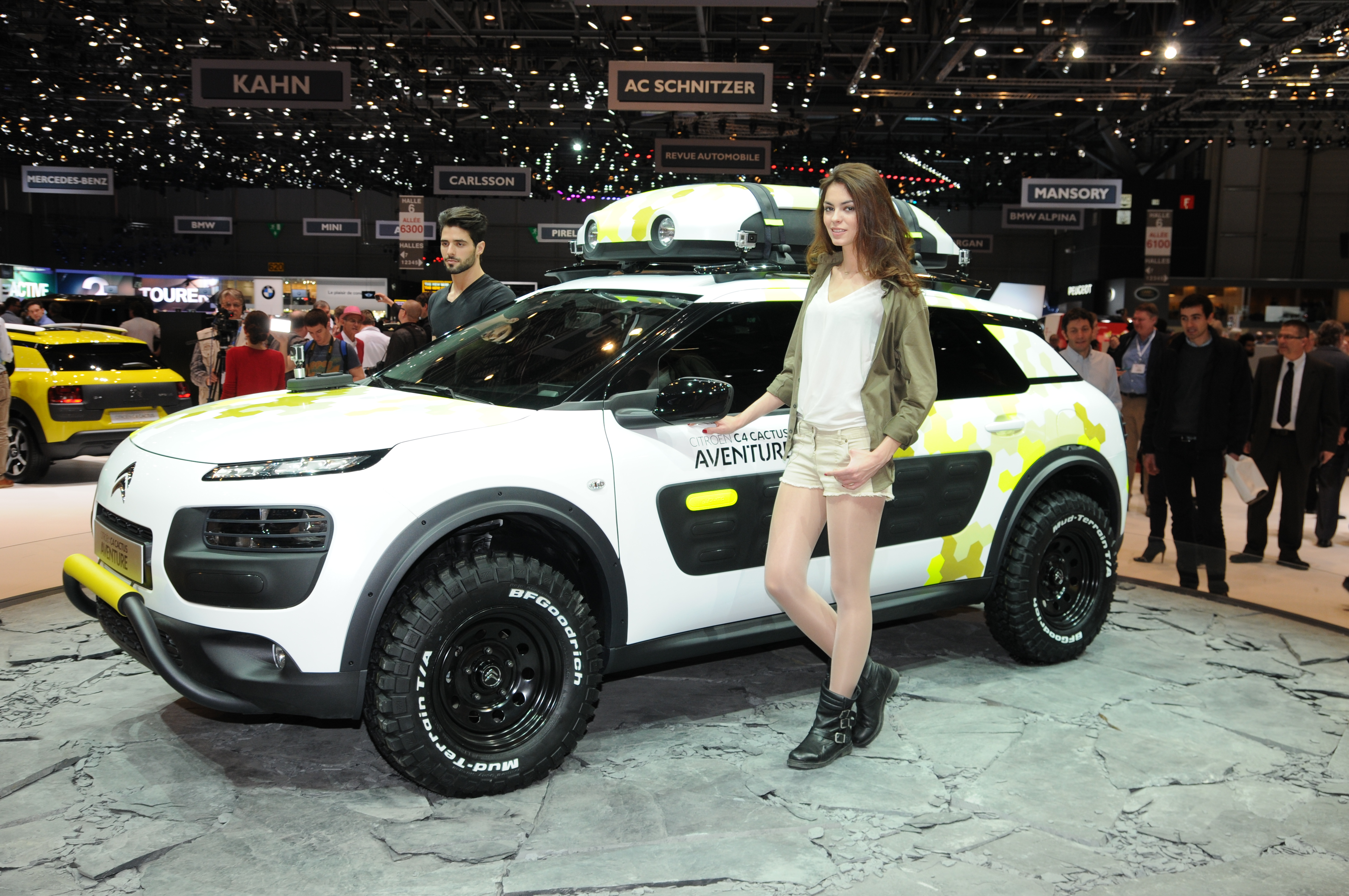
Citroën C4 Cactus Aventure (2014)

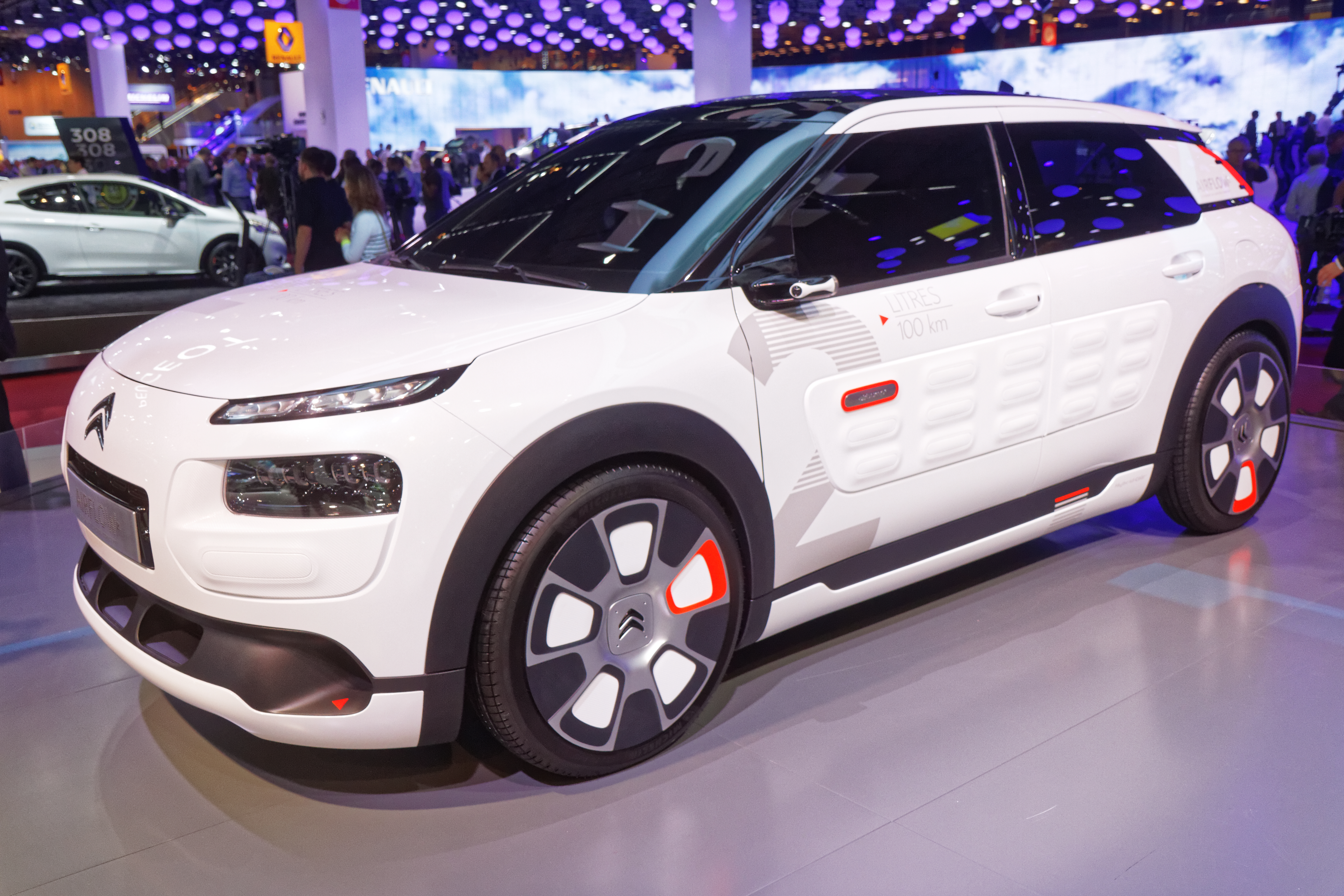
Citroën C4 Cactus Airflow 2L (2014)

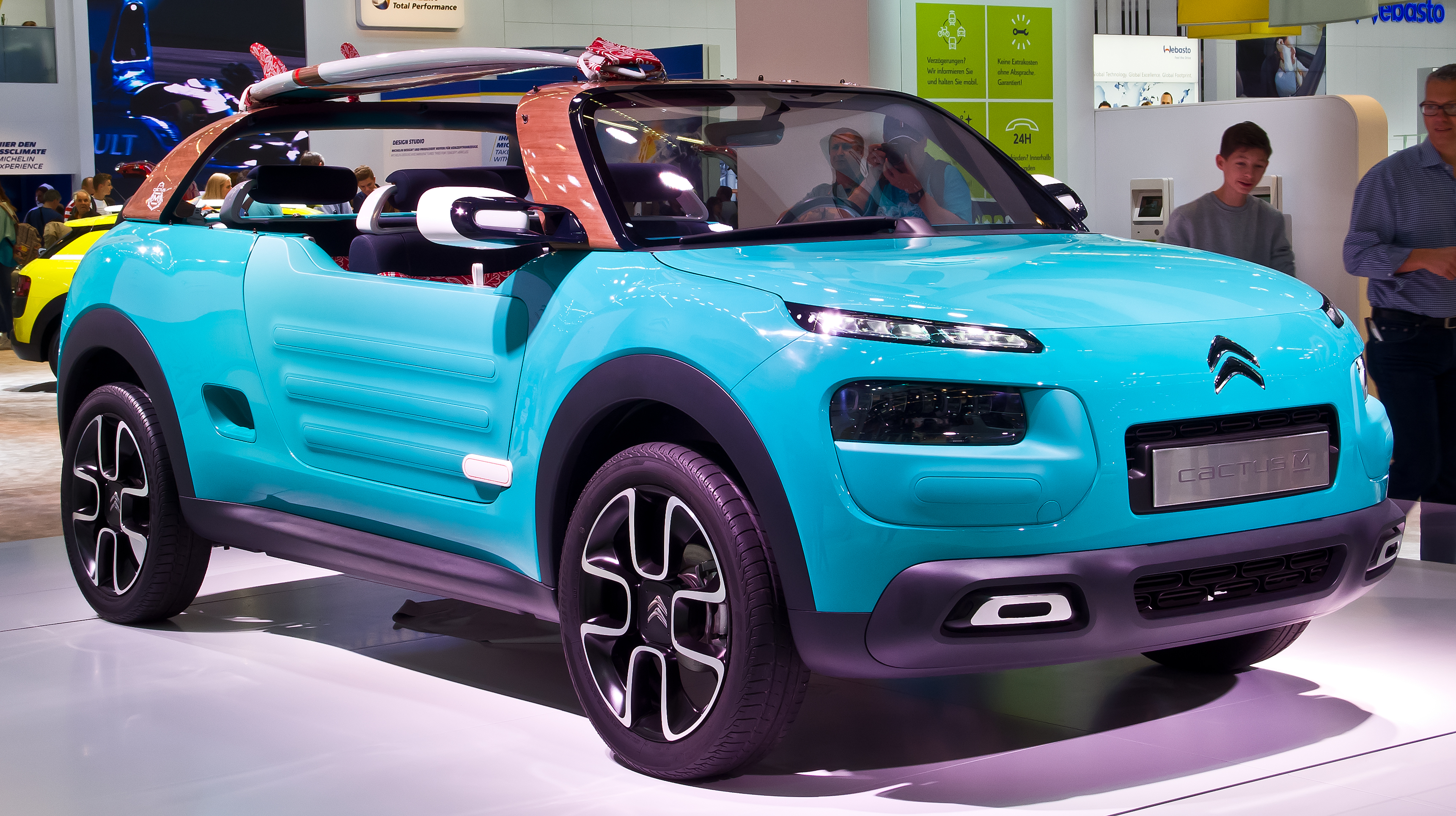
Citroën Cactus M (2015)

== Awards ==
- 2014 Top Gear Magazine "Hatchback of the Year".
- 2015 New York International Auto Show: World Car Design of the Year
- 2015 Geneva Motor Show (Car Design News): "Production Car of the Year"
- 2017 Auto Express "Small SUV of the Year".

== Sales ==
Year	Europe	Brazil	Argentina	Colombia	Uruguay
2014	28,974				
2015	78,888				
2016	71,378				
2017	56,245		652		
2018	57,637	3,300	2,424		
2019	52,600	16,439	4,260	591	
2020	26,379	9,529	4,763	535	330
2021	1,188	19,553	5,579	1,186	301
2022		18,450	7,757	1,594	502
2023		3,674	2,900	1,172	474
2024		1,035			
