= EMP2 platform =

PSA EMP2 platform

Overview
- Manufacturer: Groupe PSA (2013–2021); Stellantis (2021–present)
- Also called: Efficient Modular Platform; STLA Medium
- Production: 2013–present

Body and chassis
- Class: Compact/Mid-size car
- Layout: Transverse front-engine, front-wheel drive / four-wheel drive

Chronology
- Predecessor: PSA PF2 platform PSA PF3 platform GM Delta II

The EMP2 (Efficient Modular Platform) is a modular car platform which is jointly developed and used by French car manufacturer PSA Group (merged into Stellantis since 2021) for compact and mid-size cars with front wheel drive or four wheel drive and transverse engine. It replaces the PF2 and PF3 platforms in one combined modular platform, and cost PSA €630 million to develop.

== Specification ==
The EMP2 platform is highly modular, with a choice of short and long wheelbase, low or high riding height, and a choice of independent multi-link or twisted-beam rear suspension. Comparing to the predecessor PF2, the platform reduces the weight by 70 kg using very high strength steel, aluminum and magnesium alloys, and composite materials.

This platform was first used on the second-generation Citroën C4 Picasso and then on the second-generation Peugeot 308 and second-generation Peugeot 408.

The later iteration of the EMP2 has a degree of flexibility which allows four different track widths, five different wheelbase lengths, two different cockpit architectures, two rear axle architectures, several rear vehicle modules for various versions (short, long, five or seven-seater, single seats or rear bench, combustion engine or hybrid), and up to six different rear vehicle assemblies, which can be produced on the same assembly line.

== Production ==
PSA started production of the EMP2 platform at the Vigo plant (in Spain), under the 2013 Citroën C4 Picasso which was previewed by the Technospace concept car, and the 2013 Peugeot 308, which is produced in the Sochaux plant in France.

== Vehicles based on EMP2 platform ==
=== EMP2 V1 ===
The EMP2 V1 is the first iteration of the EMP2 platform, which debuted in 2013 with the second-generation Citroën C4 Picasso and the second-generation Peugeot 308.

- Citroën C4 Picasso/Spacetourer II (3D, 2013–2020)
- Citroën Grand C4 Picasso/Spacetourer II (3A/3E, 2013–2022)
- Citroën C6 II (X81, 2016–2023; mix of PF3 and EMP2)
- Dongfeng Fengshen/Aeolus A9 (2016–2019; mix of PF3 and EMP2)
- Peugeot 308 II (T9, 2013–2021)
- Peugeot 408 II (T9, 2014–present)
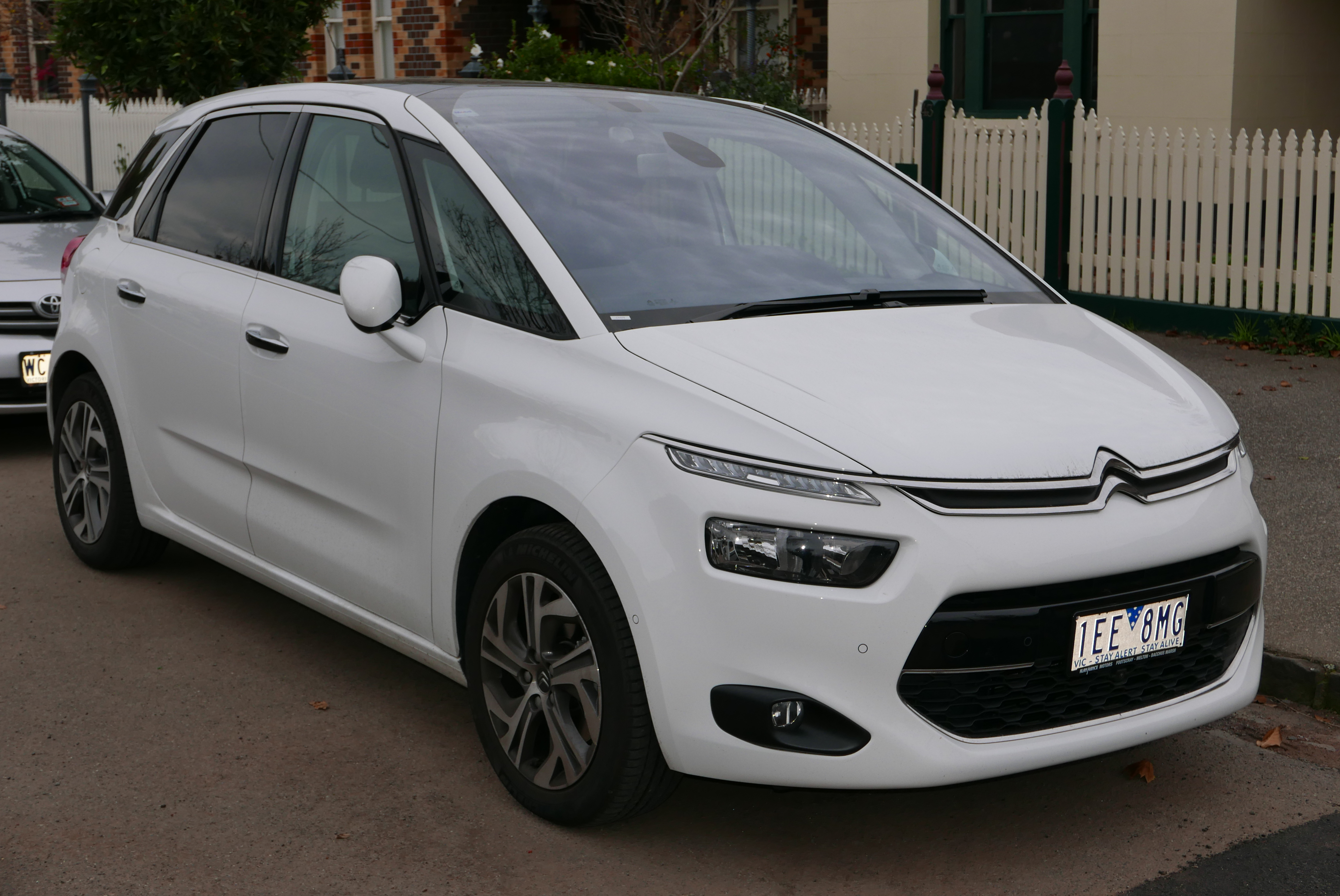
Citroën C4 Picasso/Spacetourer

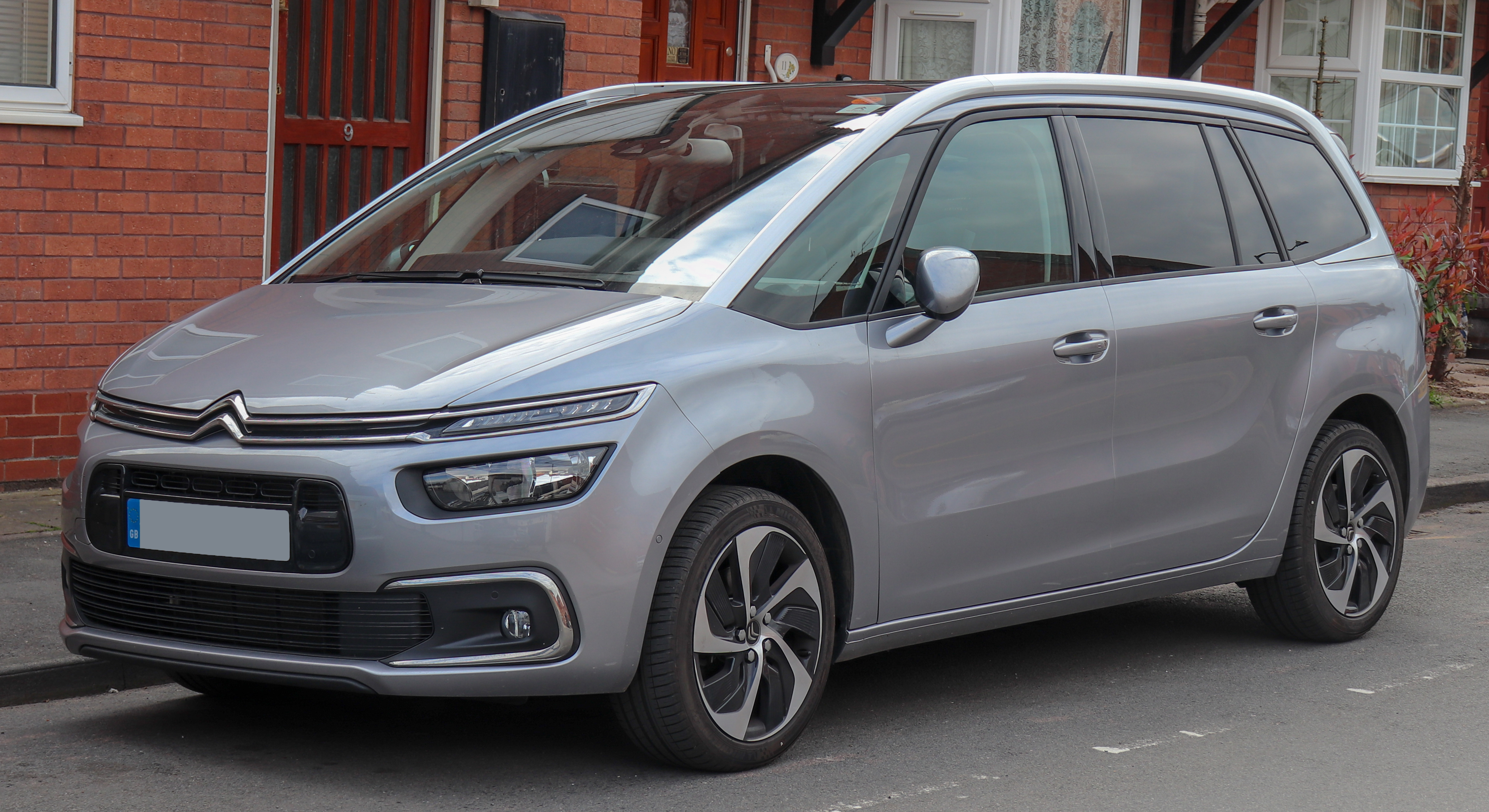
Citroën Grand C4 Picasso/Spacetourer

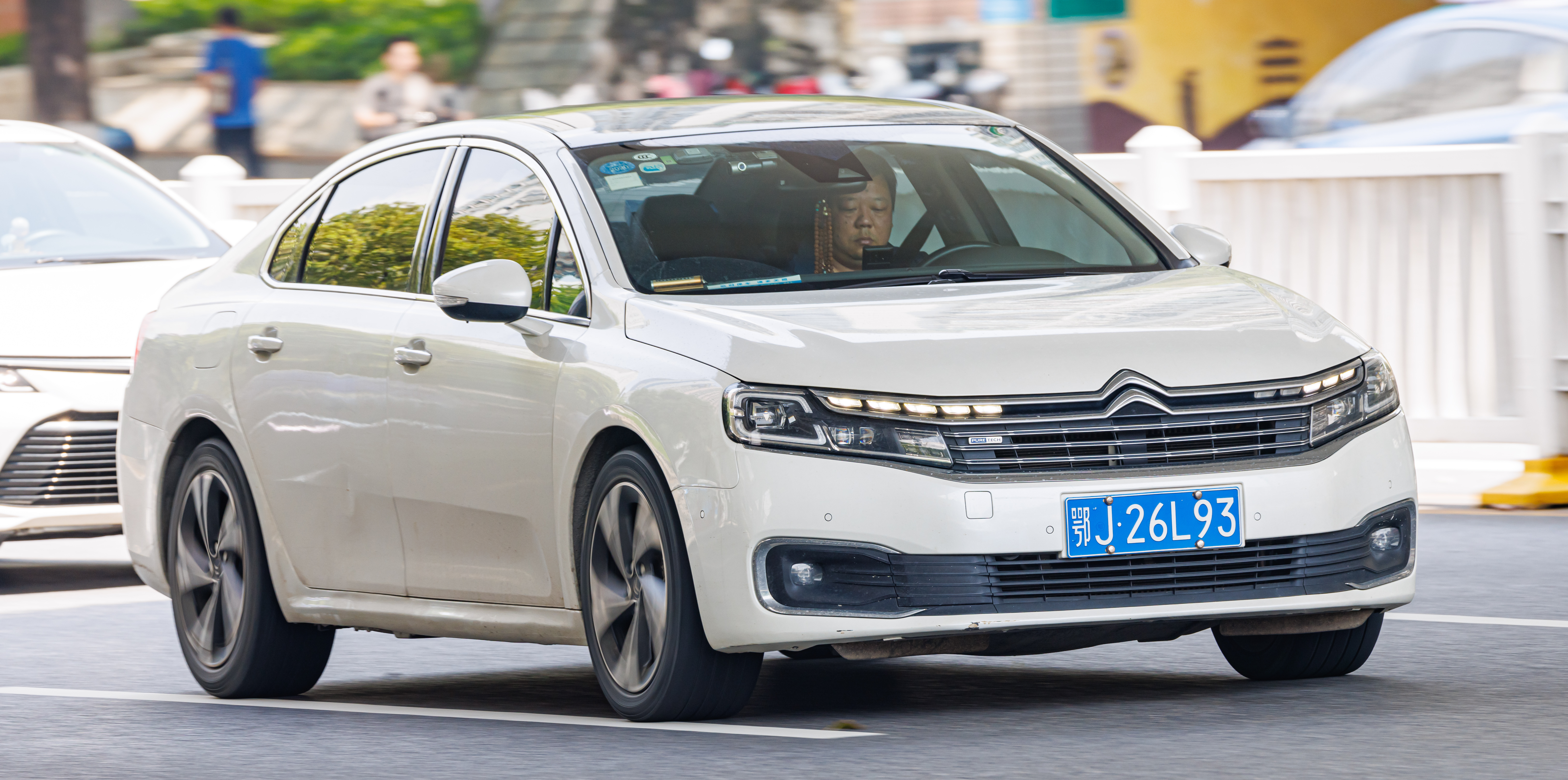
Citroën C6 II

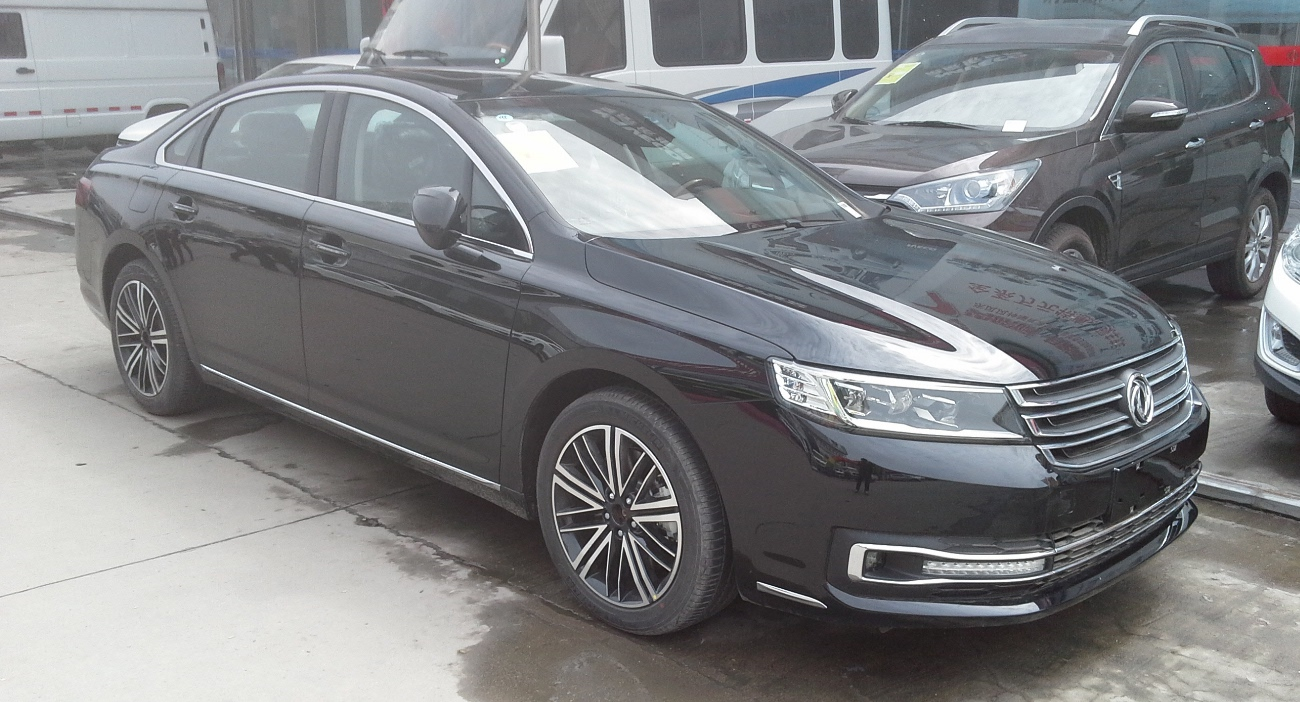
Dongfeng Fengshen/Aeolus A9

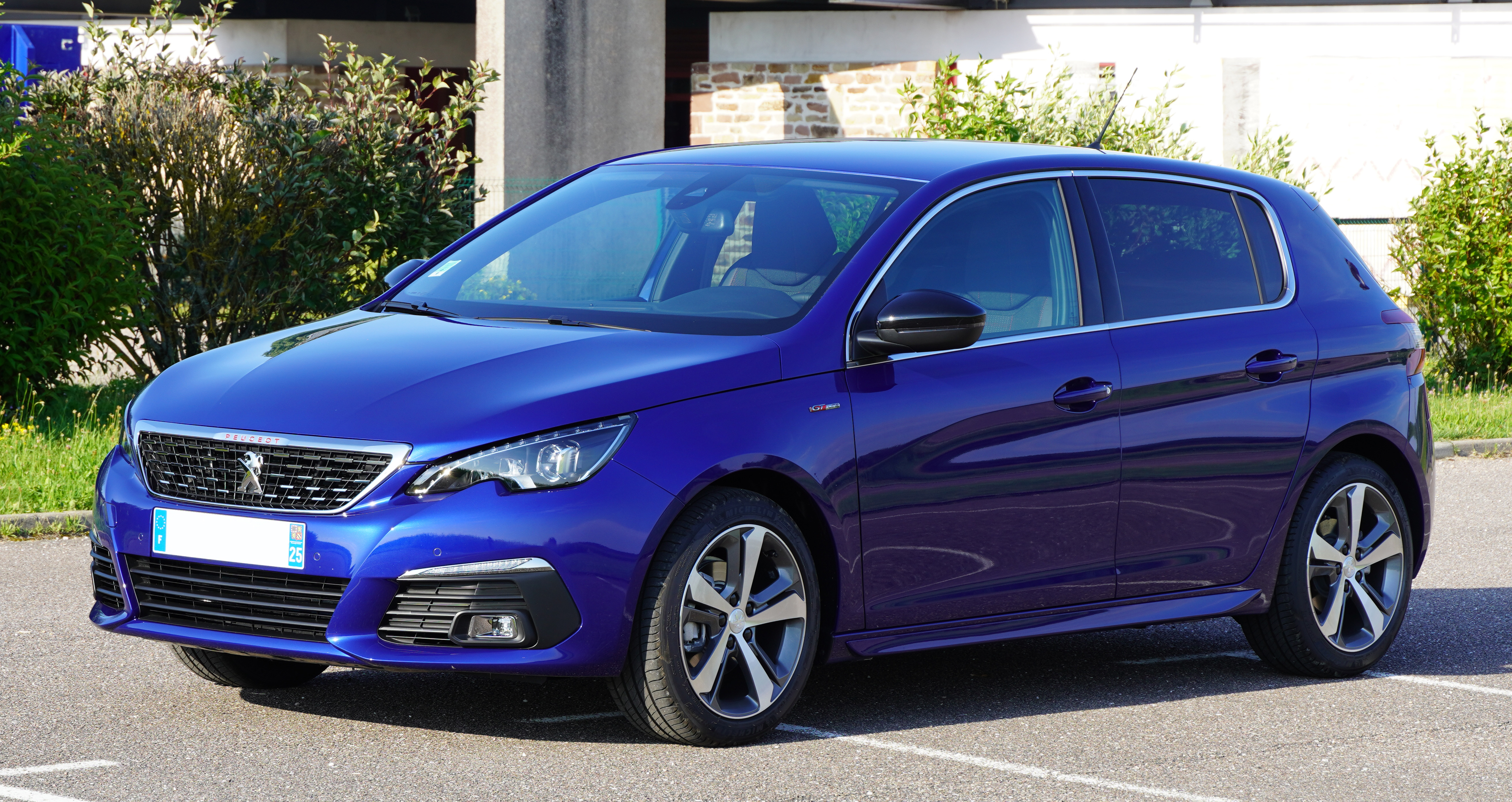
Peugeot 308 II

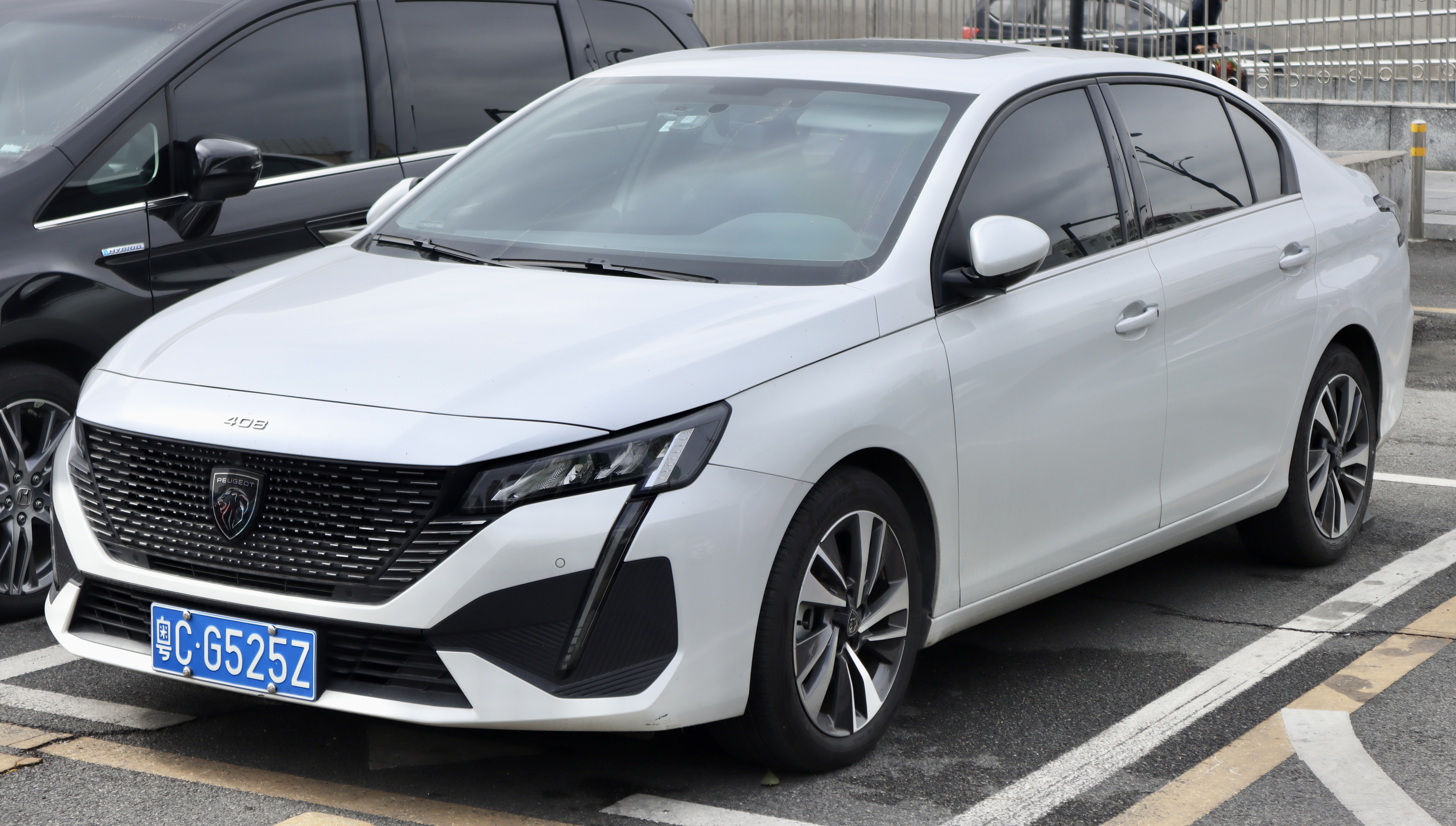
Peugeot 408 II

=== EMP2 V2 ===
The EMP2 V2 is the second iteration of the EMP2 platform, which debuted in 2016. The V2 supports mild hybrid and plug-in hybrid powertrains.

==== V2.1 ====
- Citroën C5 Aircross (C84, 2017–2025)
- DS 7 Crossback (X74, 2017–2026)
- Opel Grandland (2017–2024)
- Peugeot 3008/4008 II (P84, 2017–2024)
- Peugeot 5008 II (P87, 2017–2024)
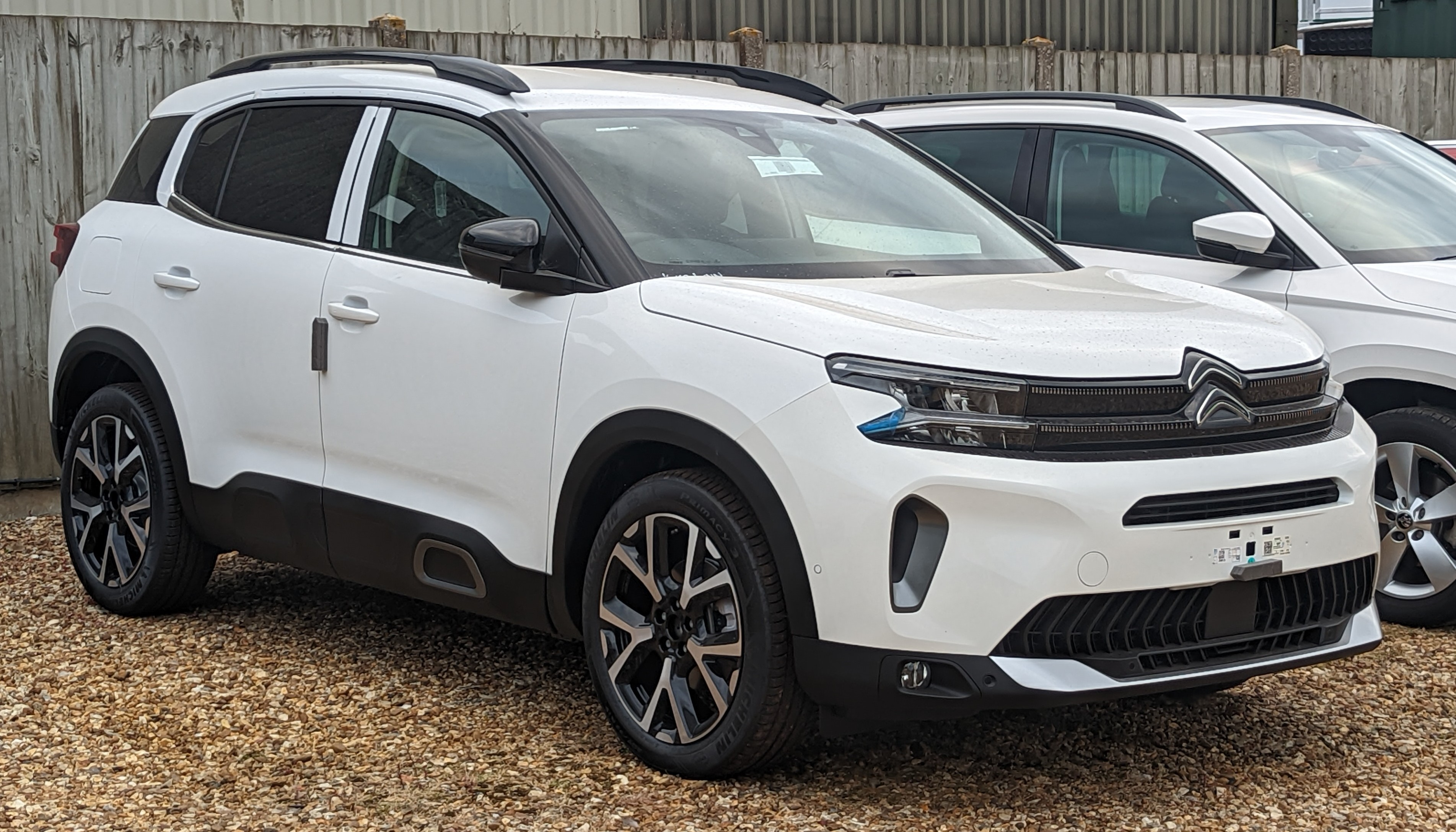
Citroën C5 Aircross

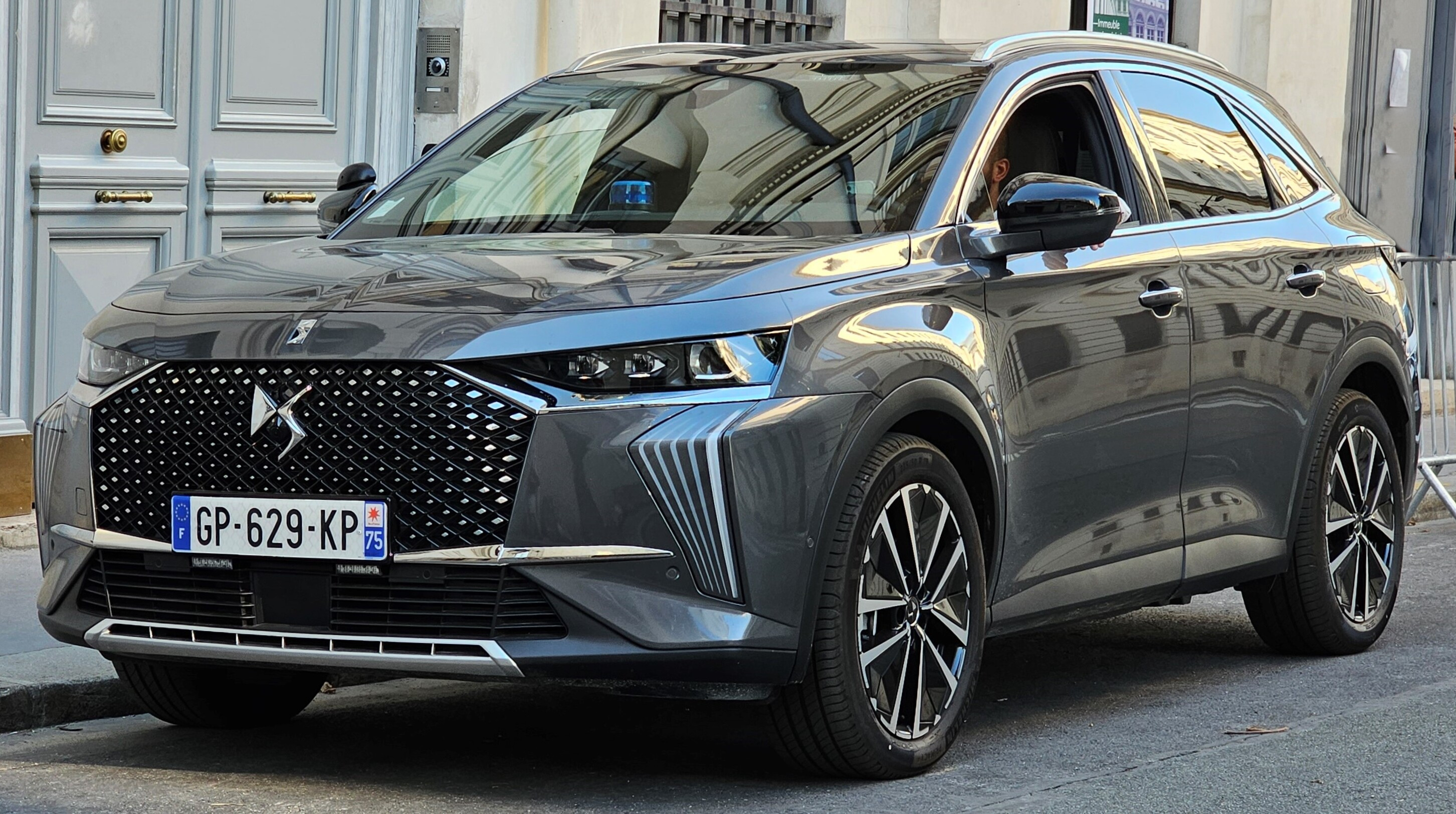
DS 7 Crossback

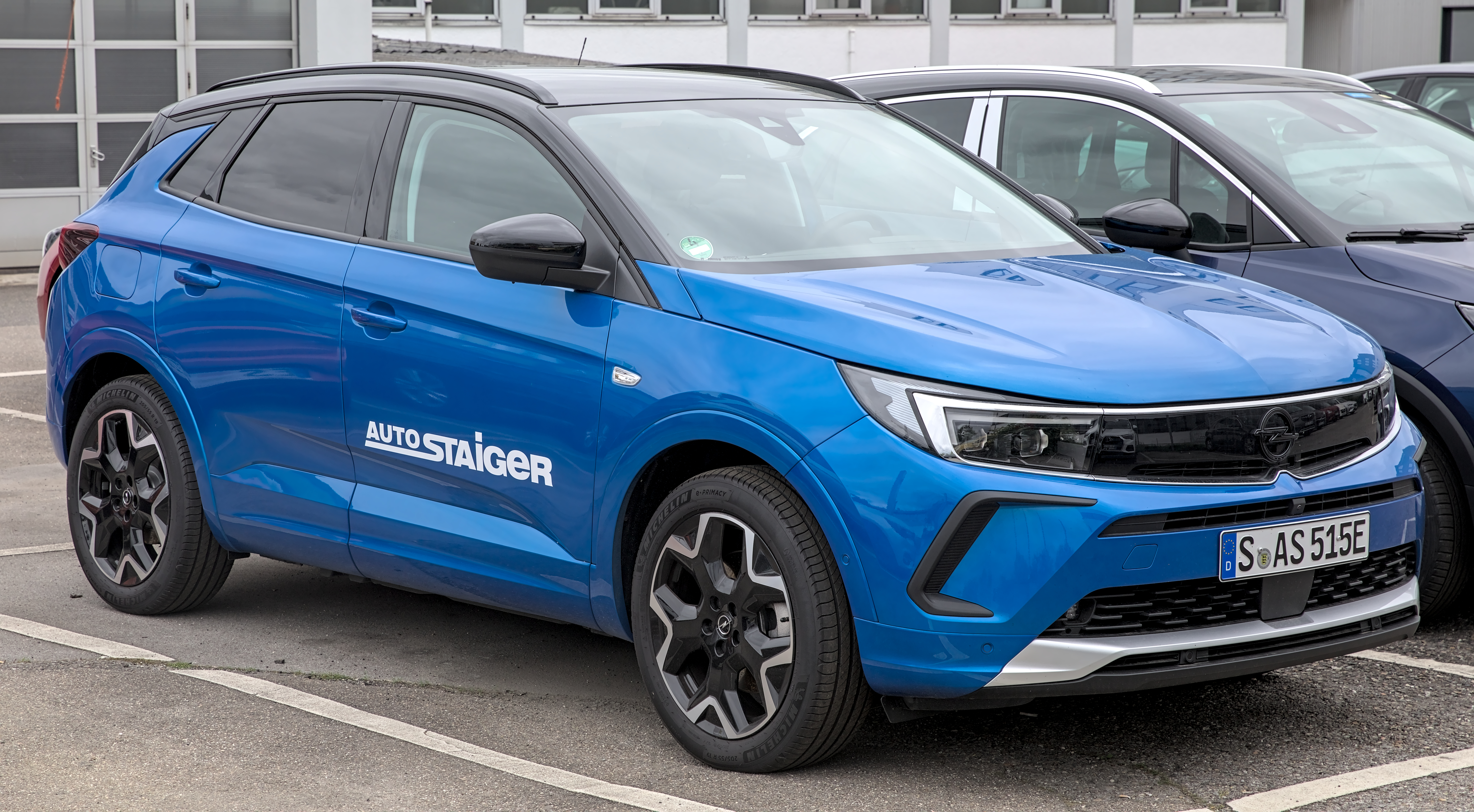
Opel Grandland

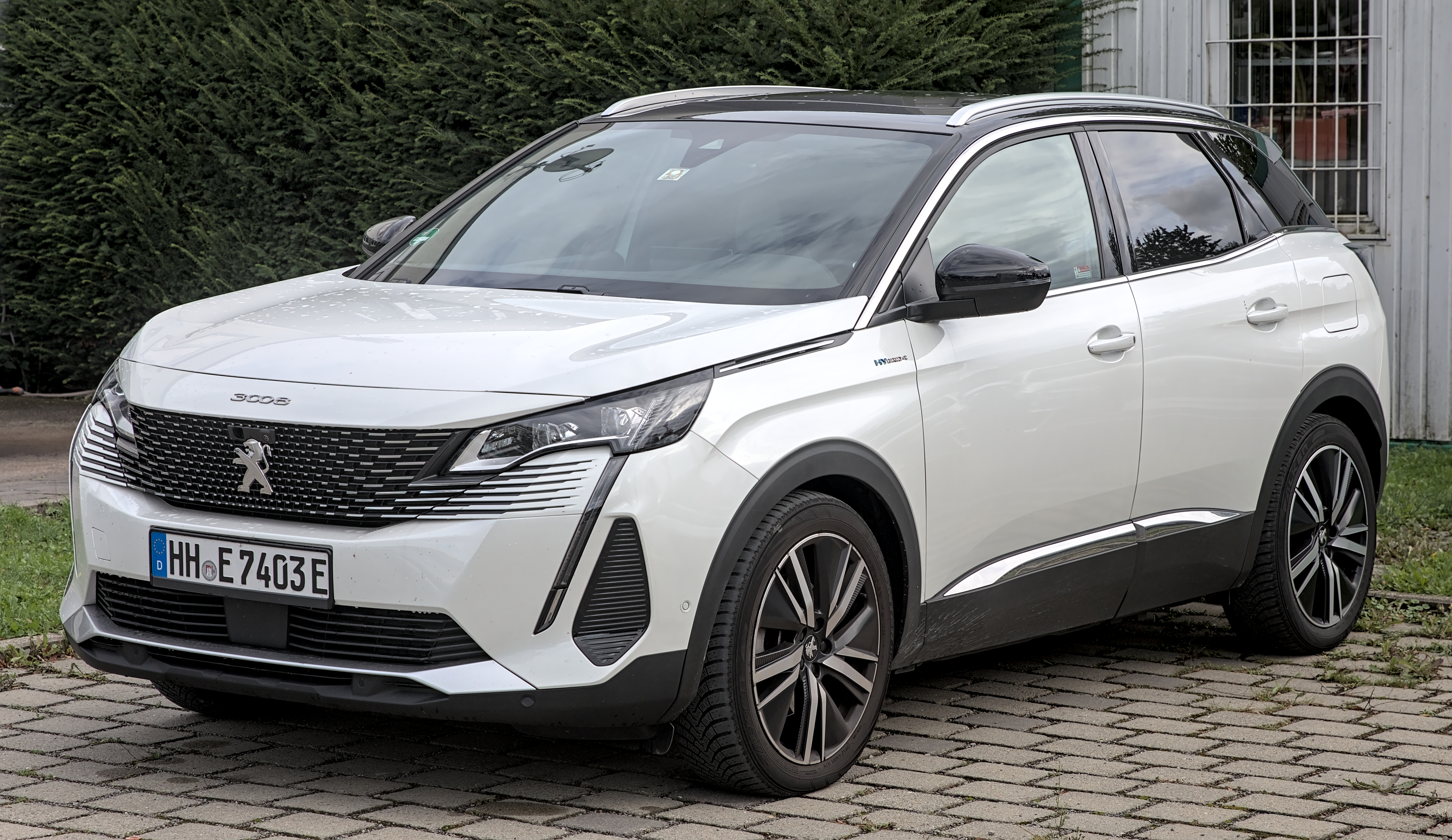
Peugeot 3008/4008 II

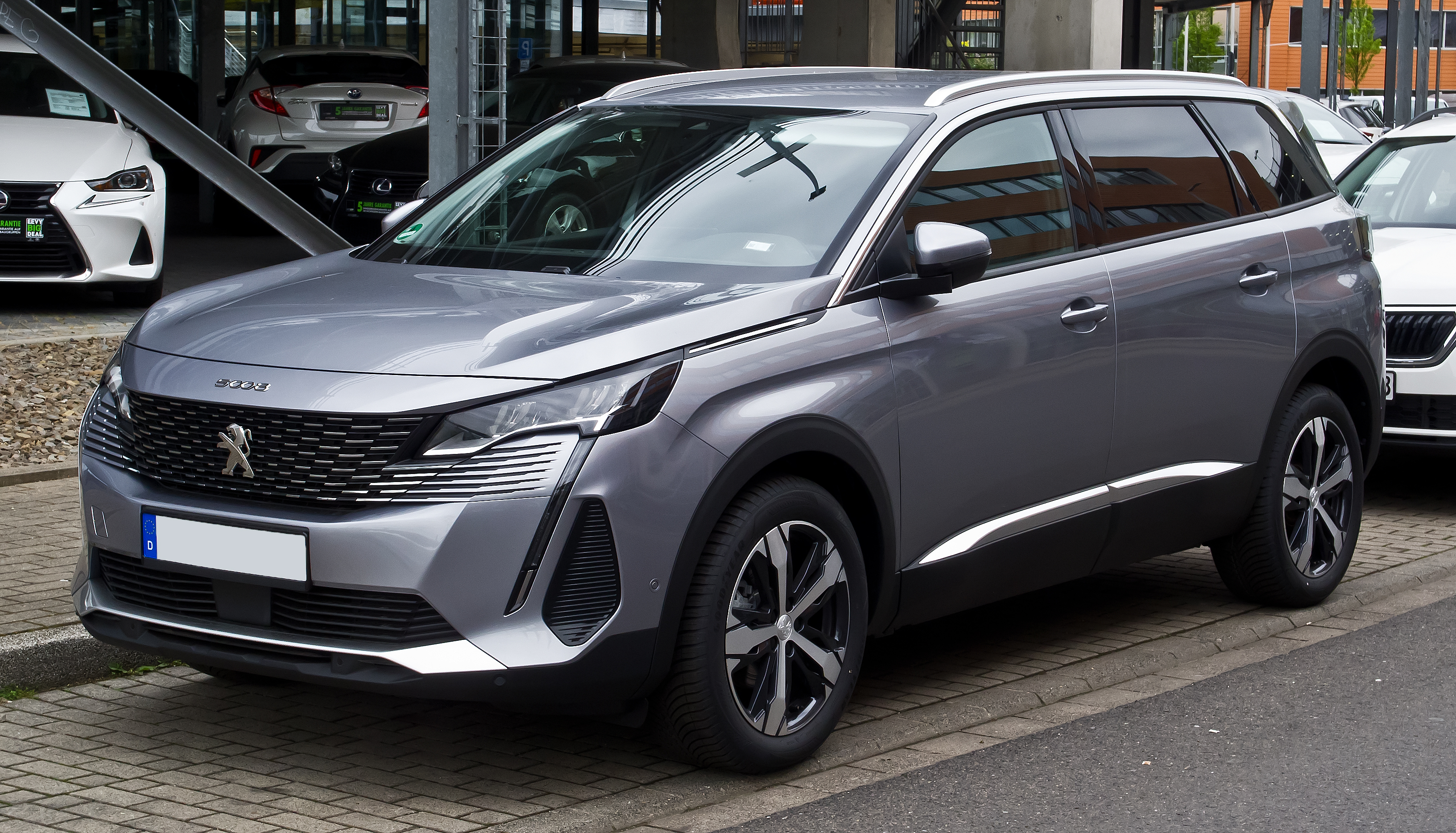
Peugeot 5008 II

==== V2.3 ====
- DS 9 (X83, 2020–2024)
- Peugeot 508 II (R82/R83, 2018–2025)
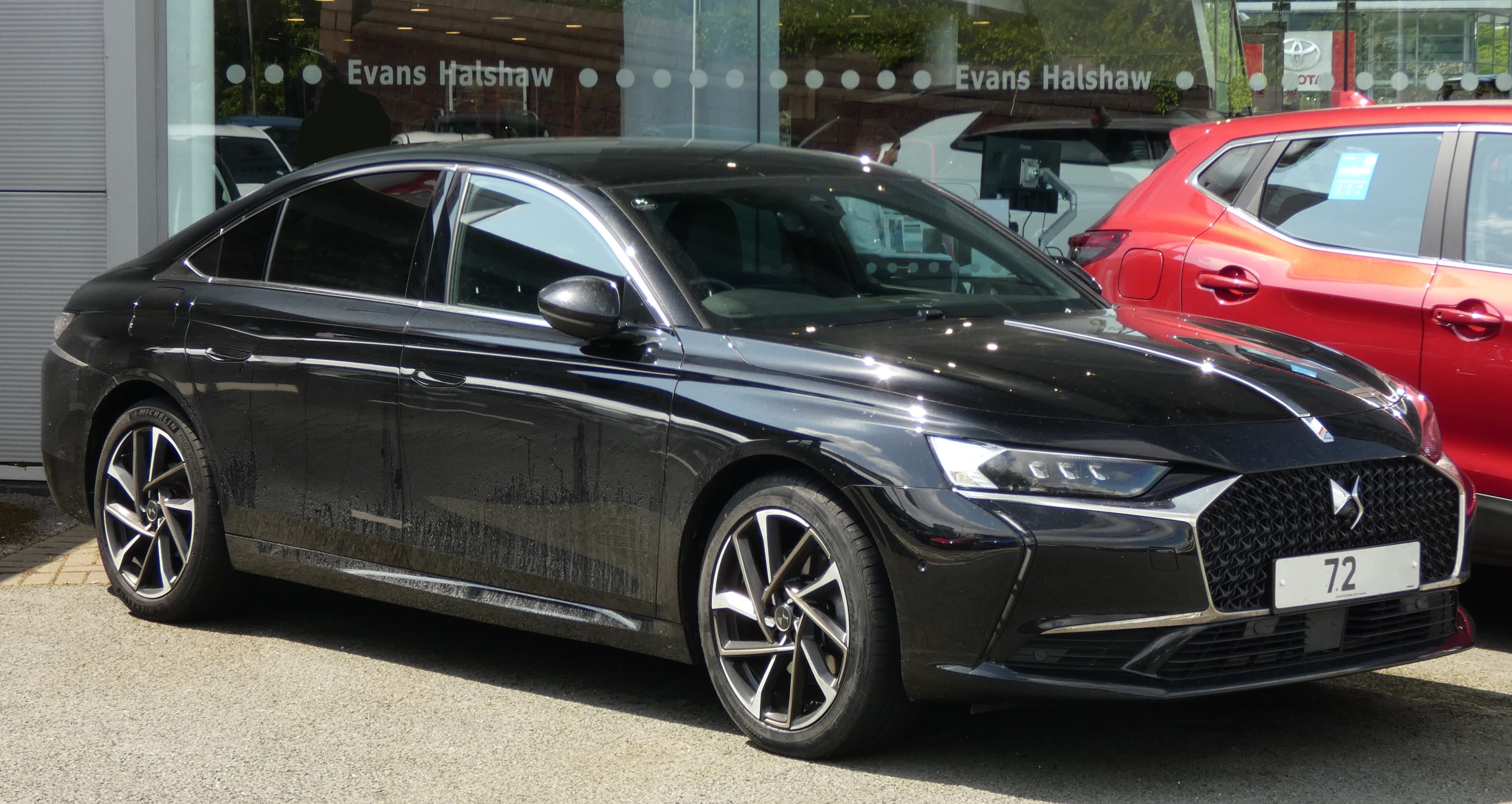
DS 9

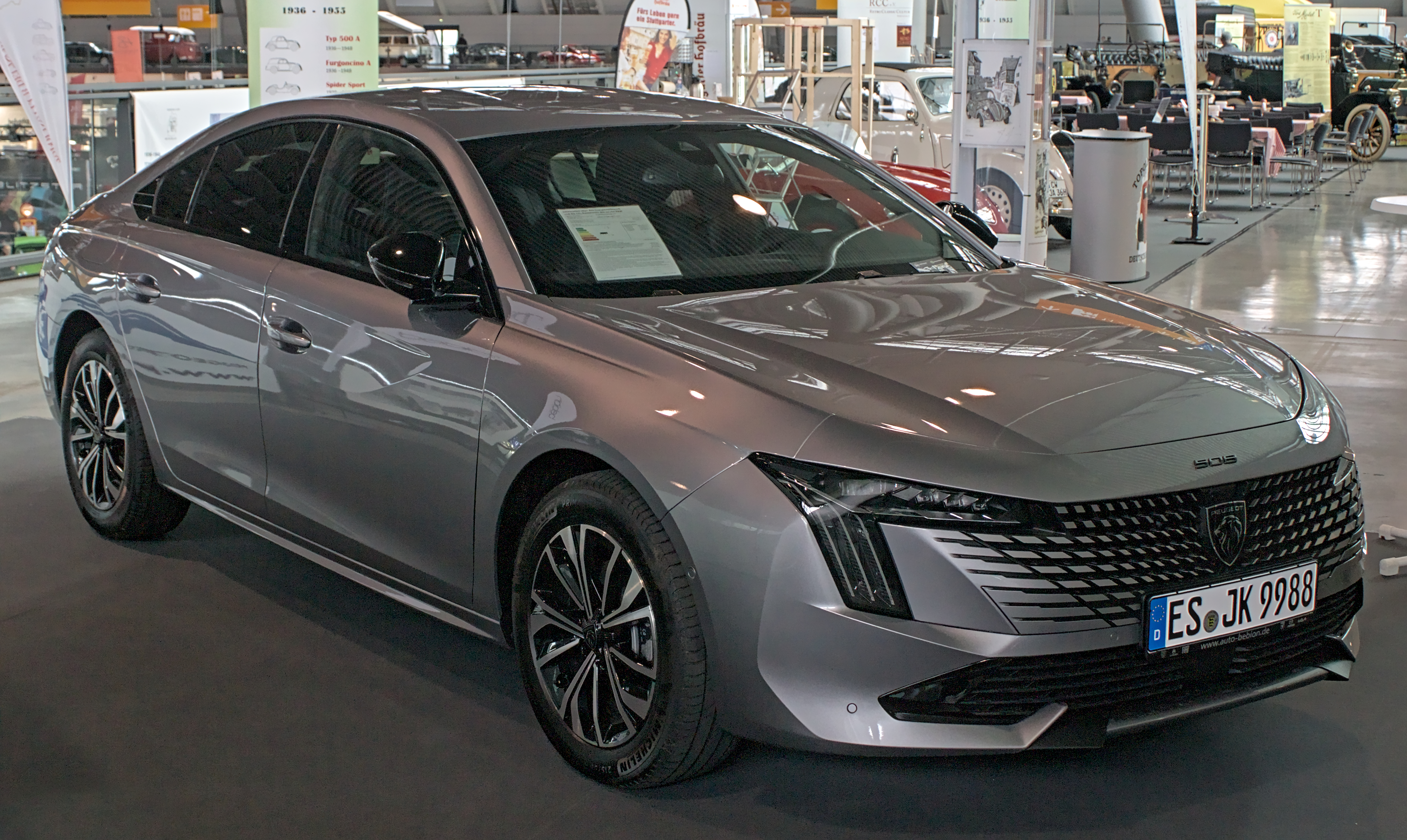
Peugeot 508 II

=== EMP2 V3 ===
The EMP2 V3 is the third iteration of the EMP2 platform, which debuted with the second-generation DS 4. The improved platform introduced 70 percent new components compared to the previous iteration. It supports mild hybrid, plug-in hybrid and battery electric powertrains.

- Citroën C5 X (E43, 2021–present)
- DS No. 4 (D41, 2021–present)
- Opel Astra L (OV51/OV52, 2021–present)
- Peugeot 308 III (P51/P52, 2021–present)
- Peugeot 408 (P54, 2022–present)
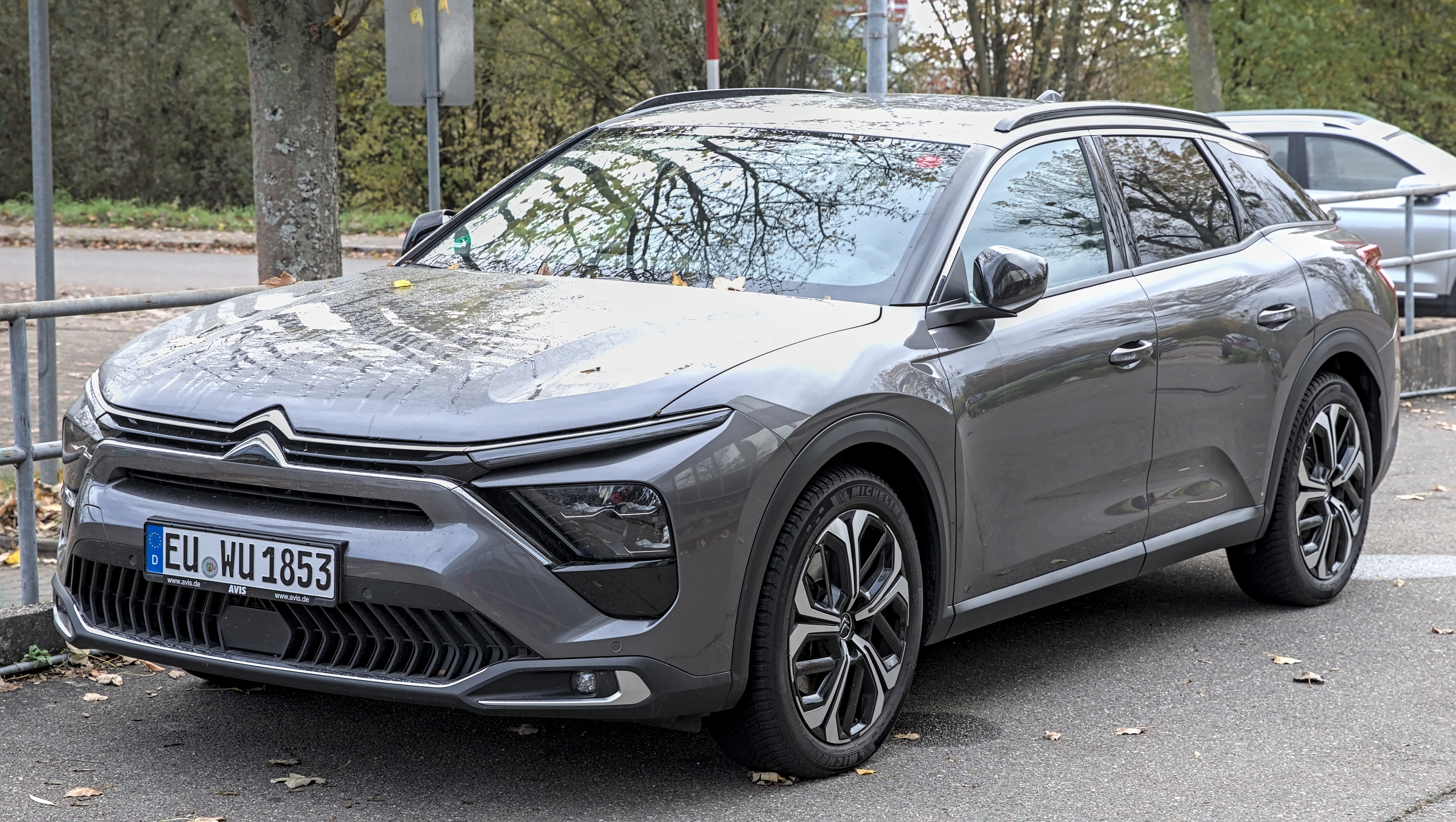
Citroën C5 X

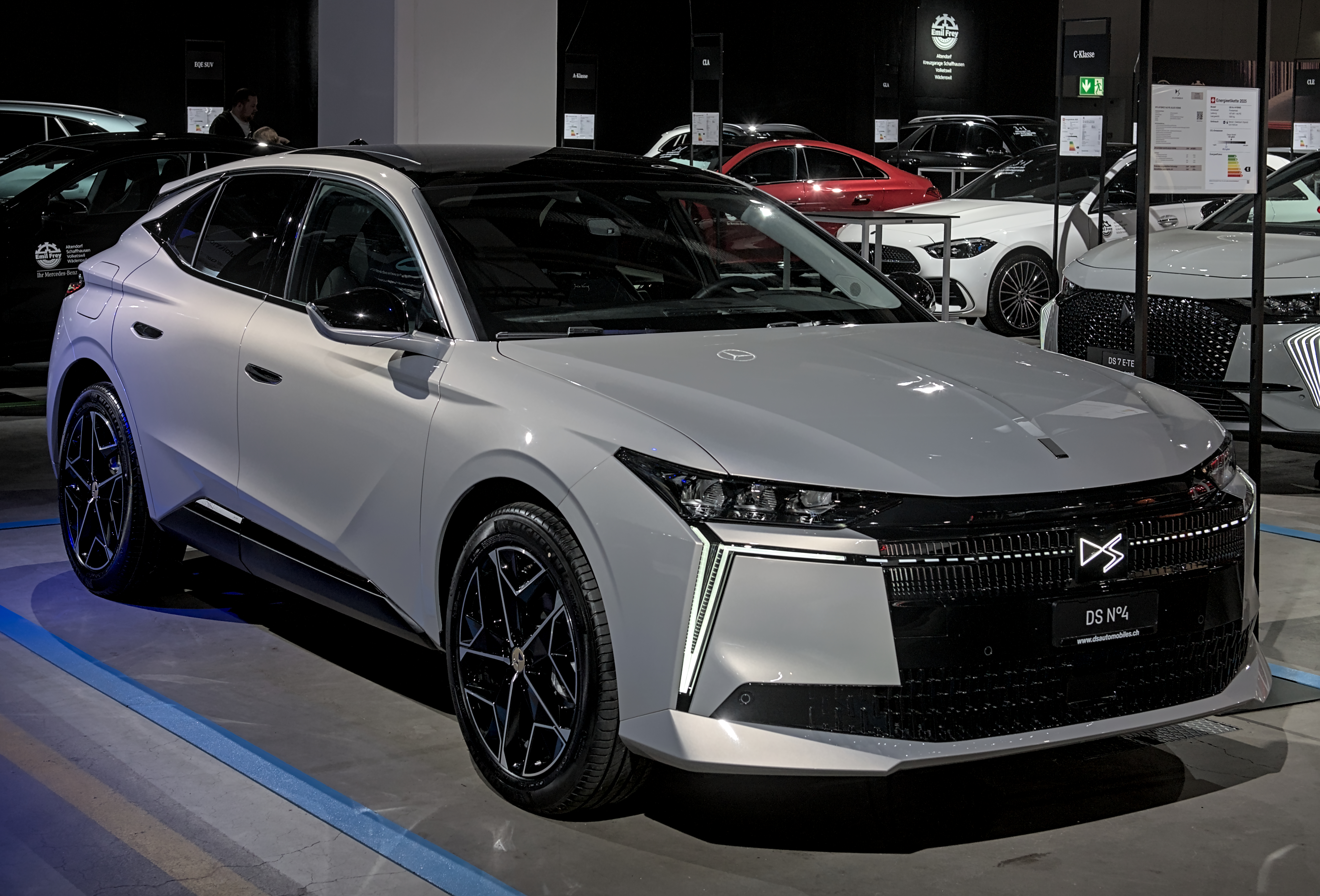
DS N°4

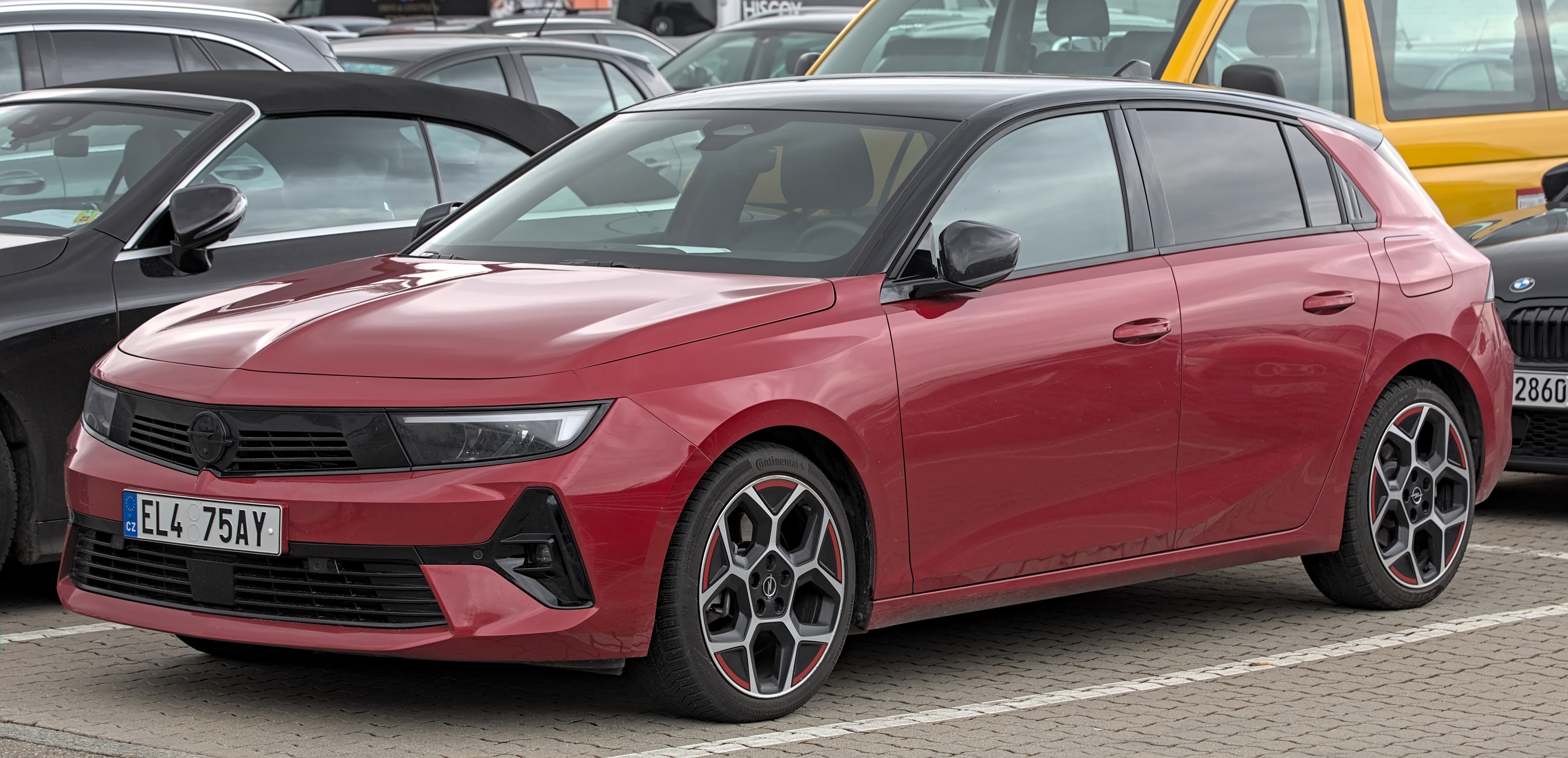
Opel Astra L

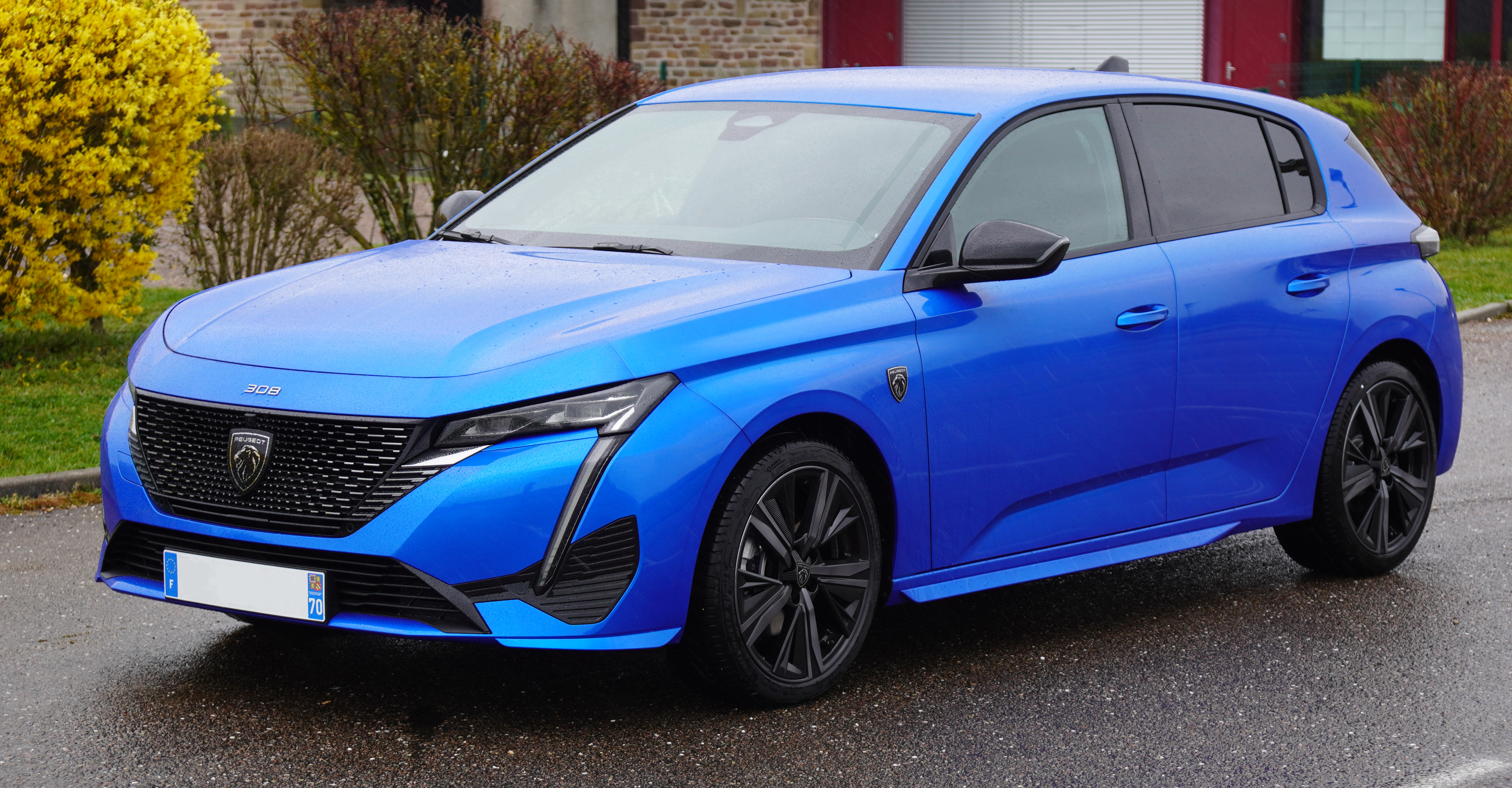
Peugeot 308 III

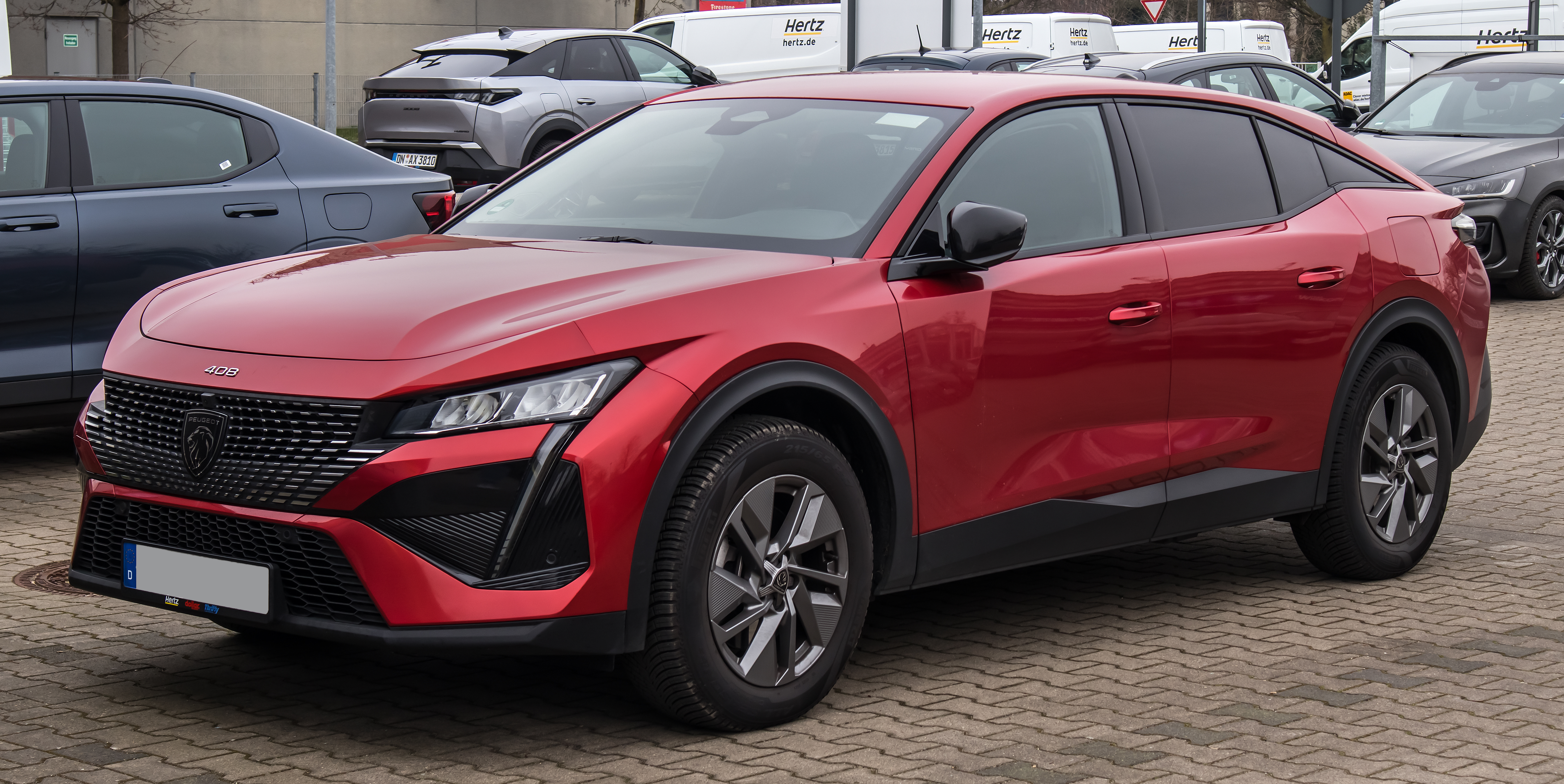
Peugeot 408

=== eVMP ===
- DS N°4 (D41, 2025–present)
- Opel Astra-e L (OV51/OV52, 2023–present)
- Peugeot e-308 III (P51/P52, 2022–present)
- Peugeot e-408 (P54, 2025–present)
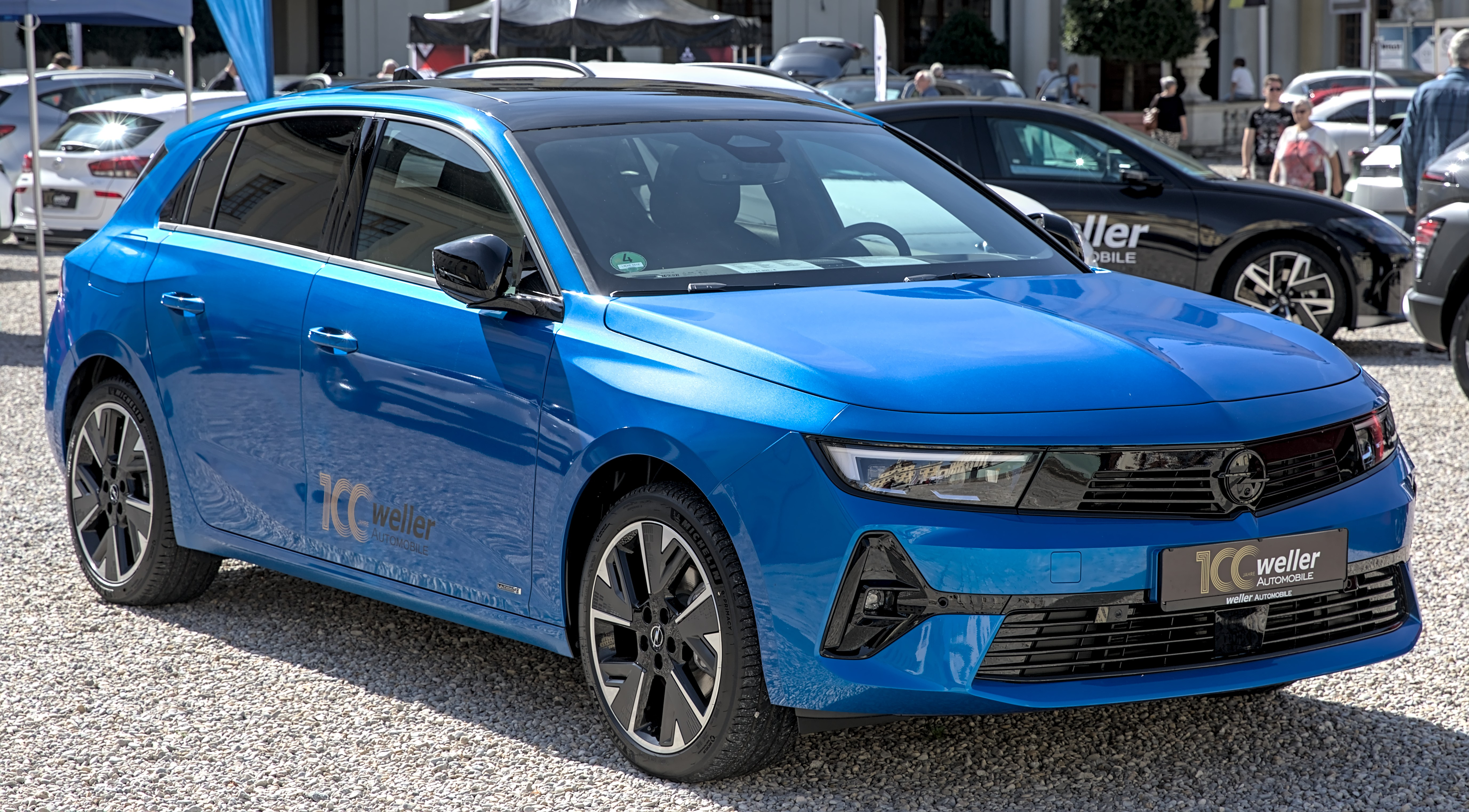
Opel Astra-e L

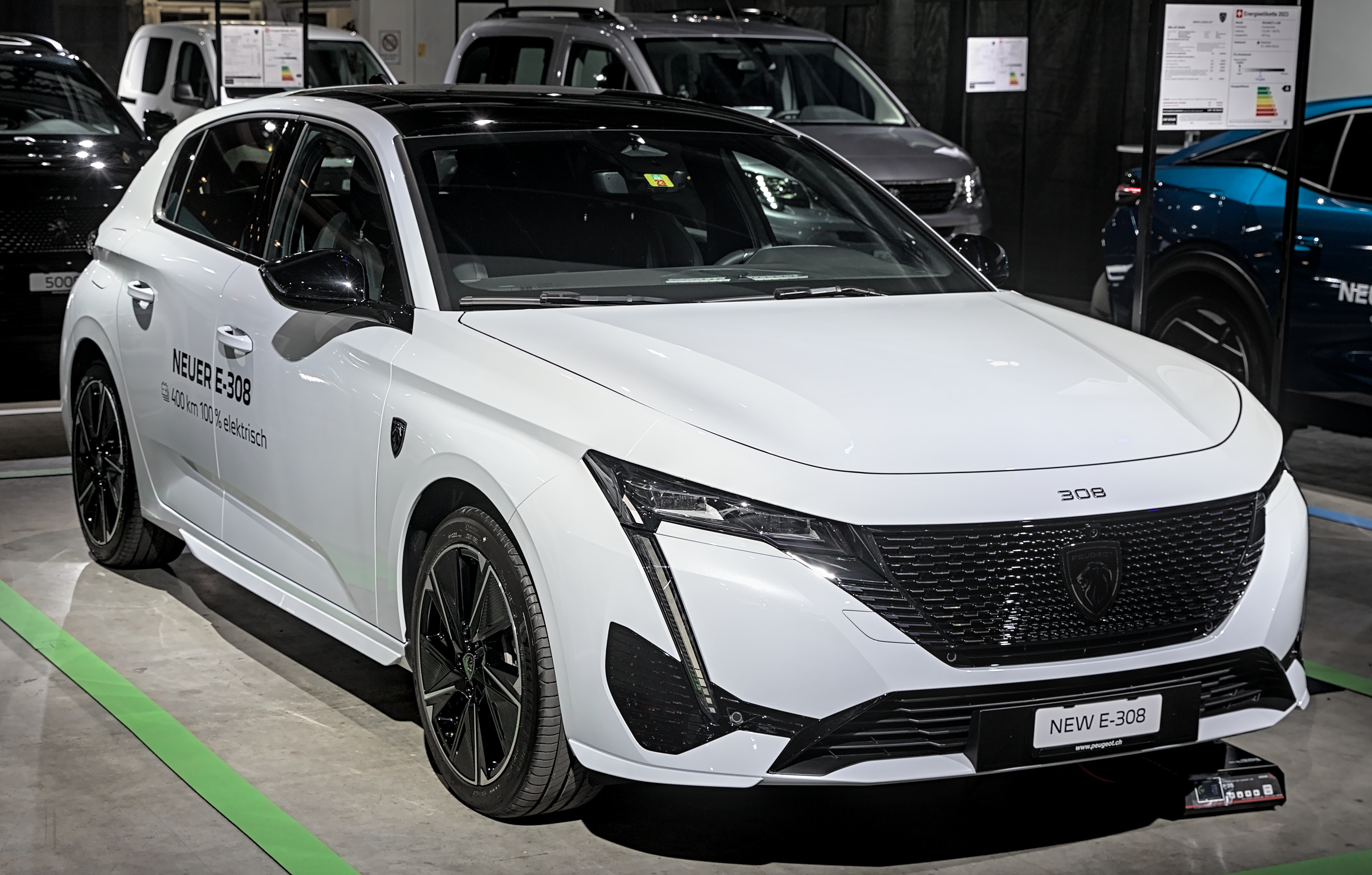
Peugeot e-308 III

=== STLA Medium ===
- Peugeot 3008 III (e-P64, 2023–present)
- Peugeot 5008 III (e-P67, 2024–present)
- Opel Grandland II (2024–present)
- Citroën C5 Aircross II (CR3, 2025–present)
- Jeep Compass III (J4U, 2025–present)
- DS No. 8 (D85, 2025–present)
- DS No. 7 (2026–present)
- Lancia Gamma (L74, 2026–present)
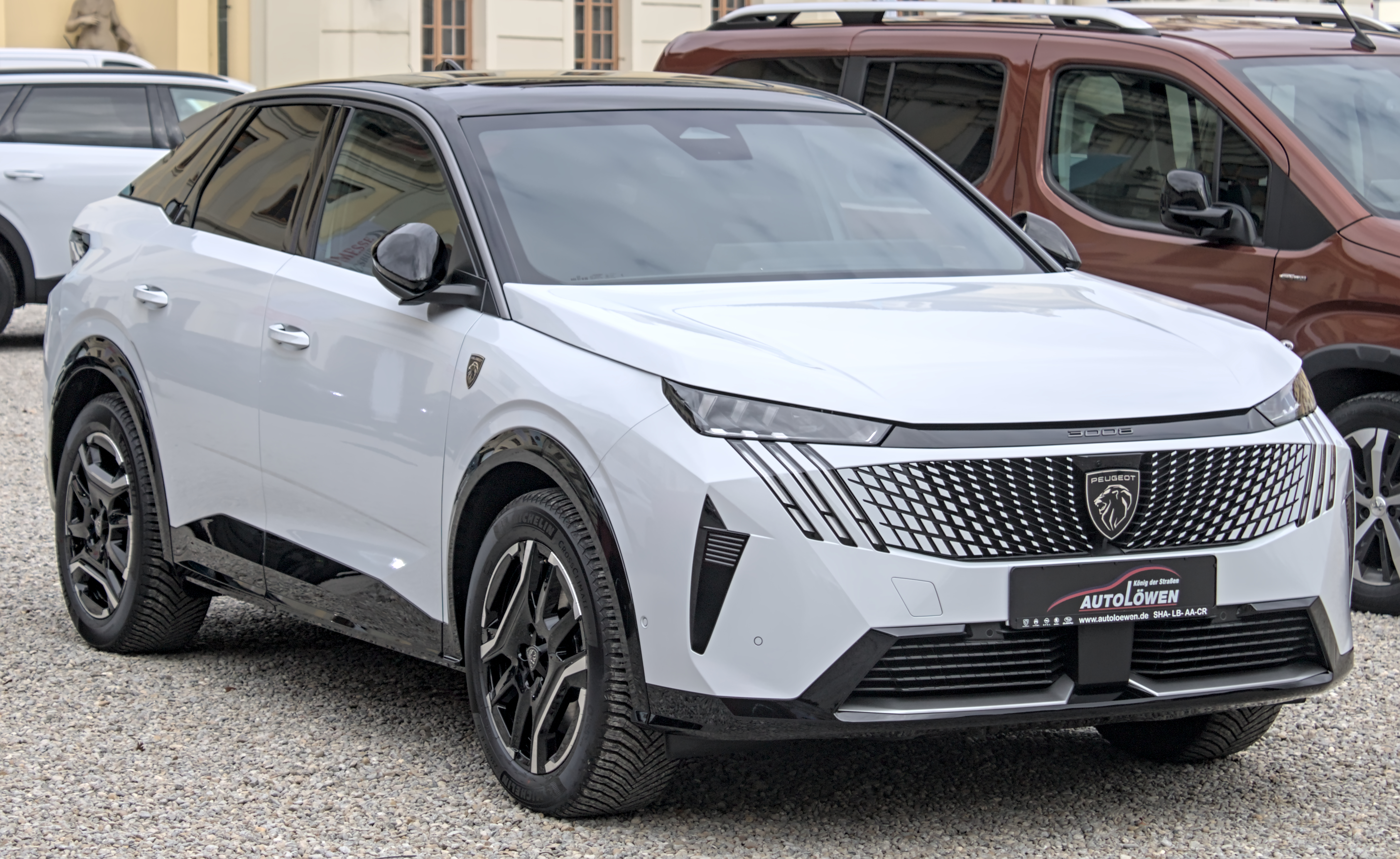
Peugeot e-3008 III

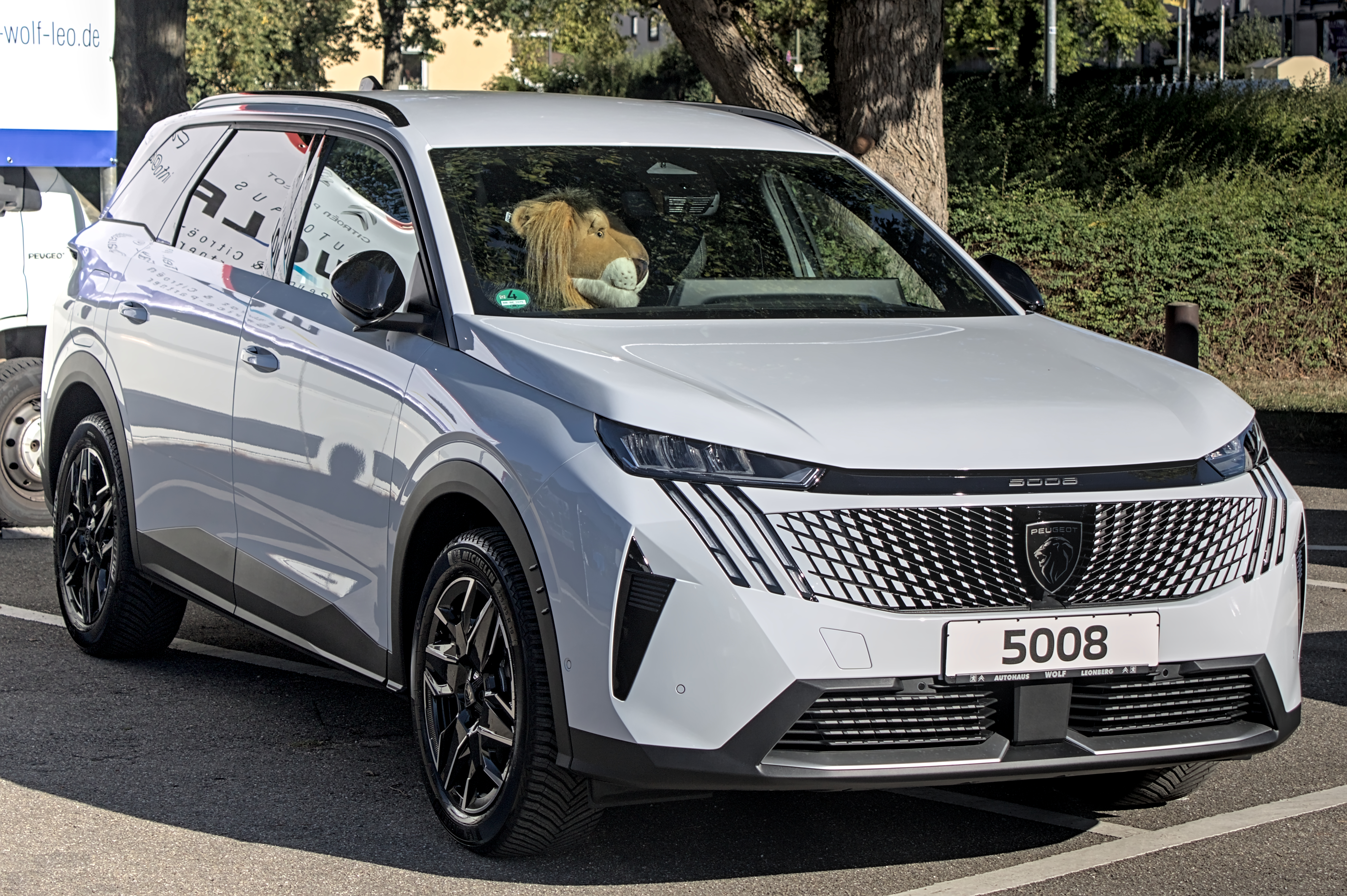
Peugeot e-5008 III

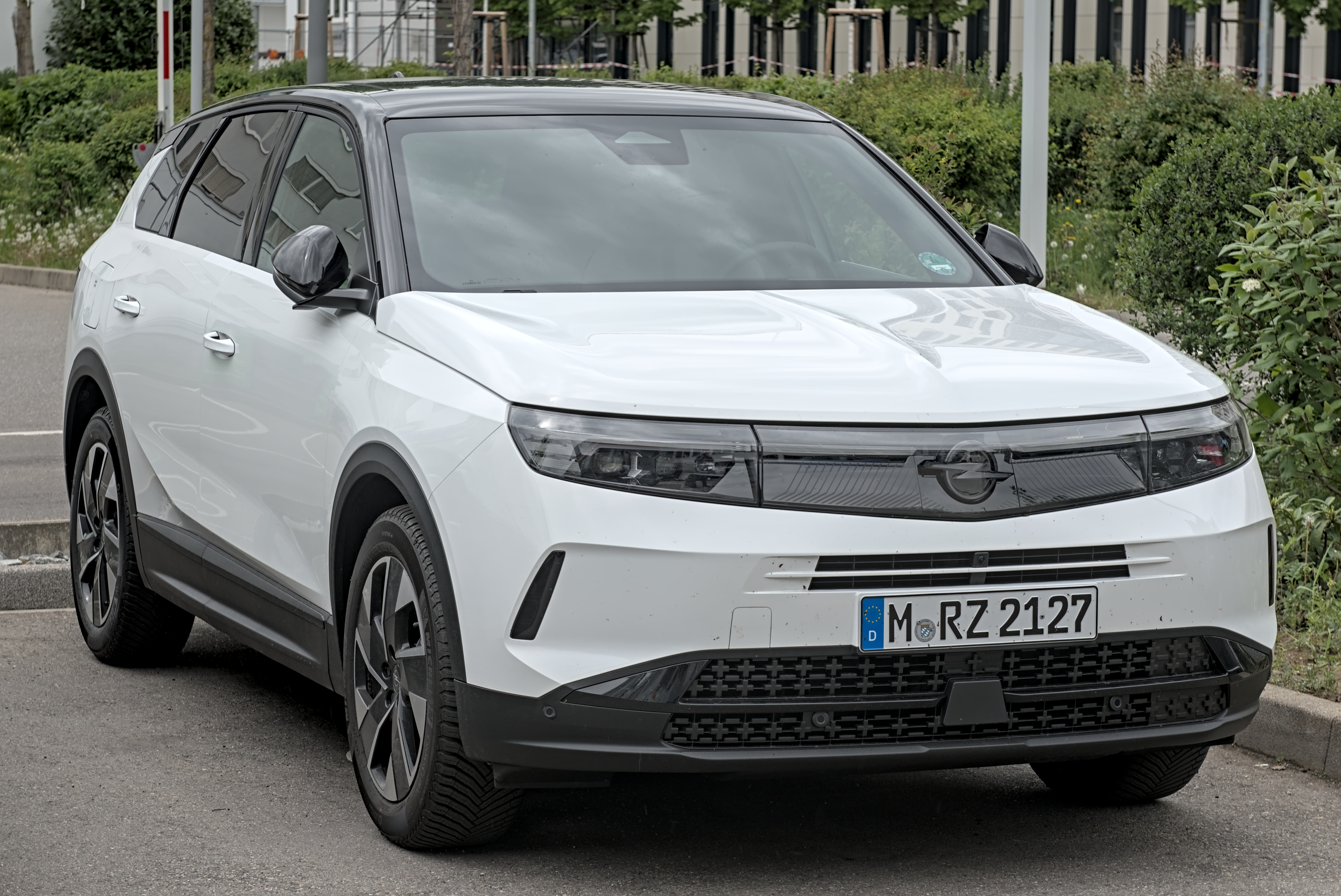
Opel Grandland II

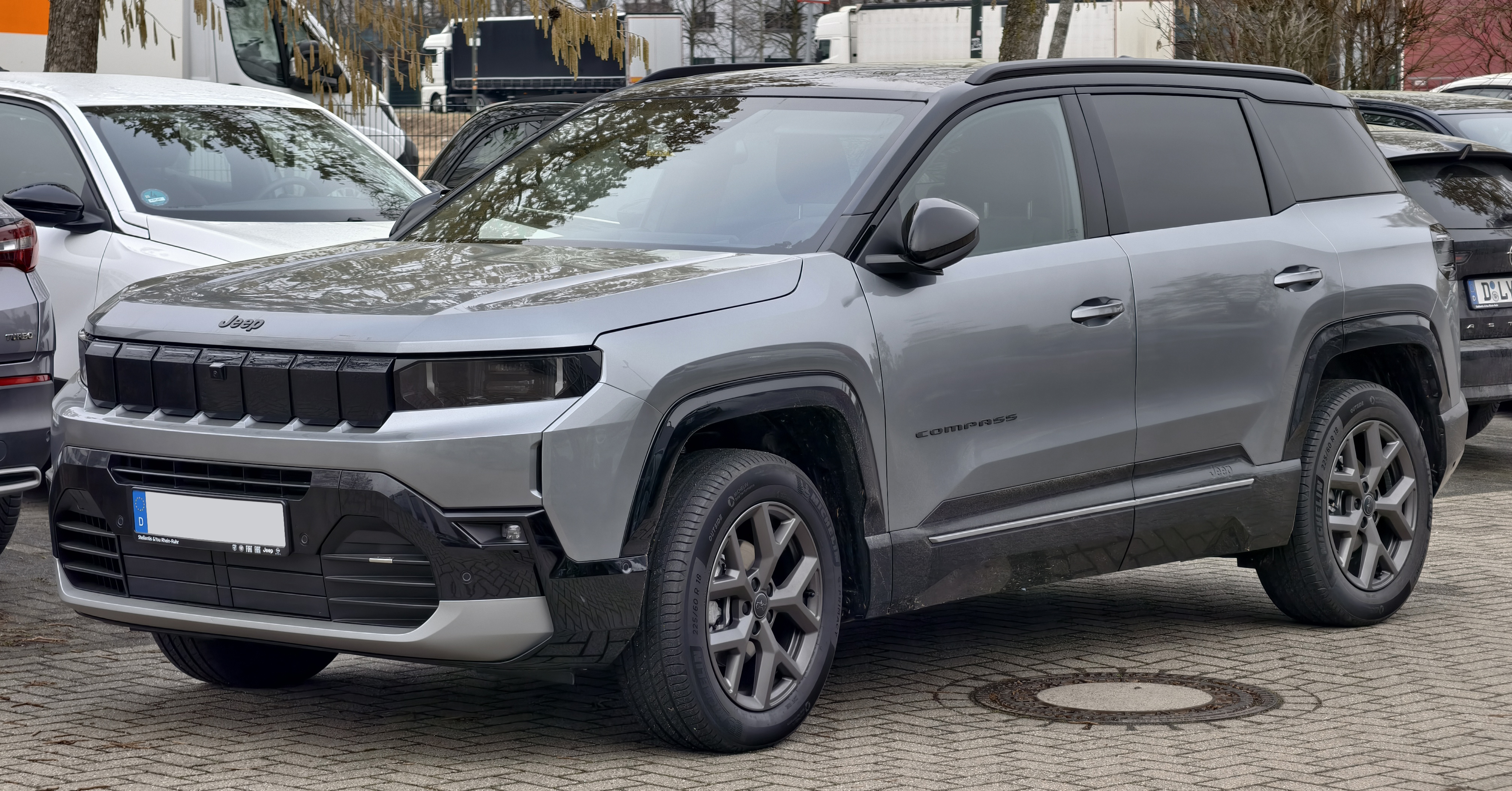
Jeep Compass III

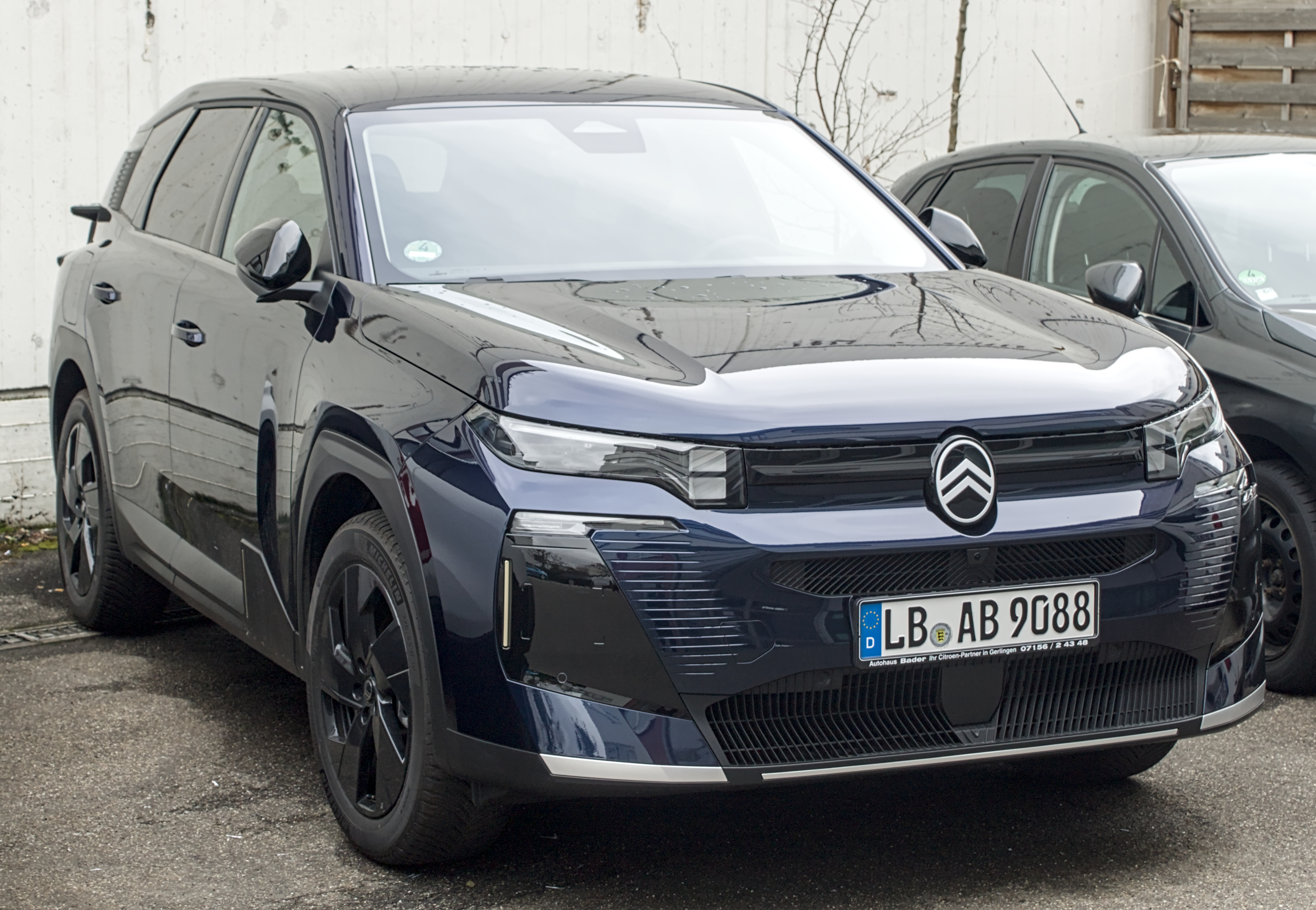
Citroën C5 Aircross II

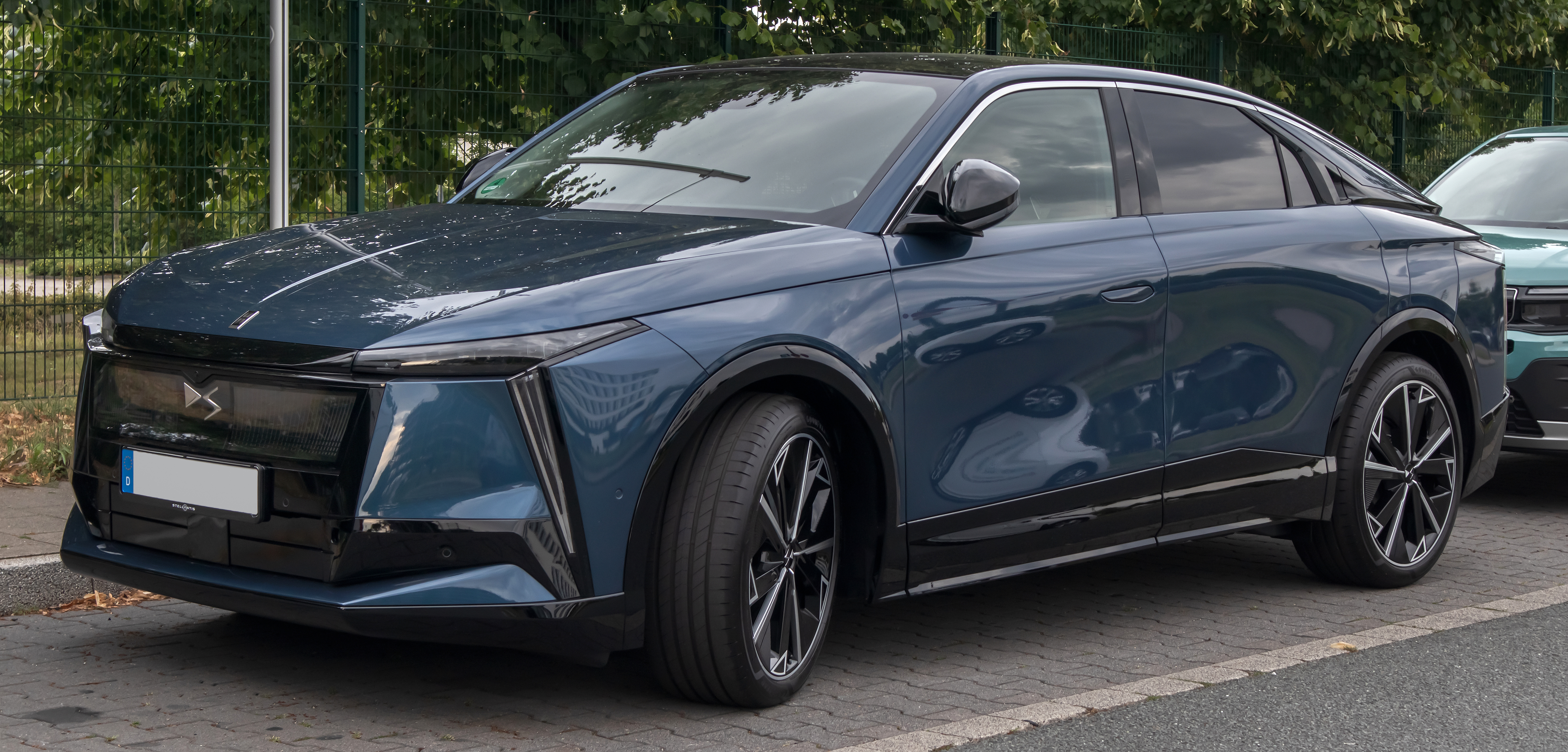
DS No. 8

DS No. 7

Lancia Gamma

=== K9 platform ===
- Citroën Berlingo III (K9, 2018–present; the front end adopted the EMP2 while the rear section is derived from the previous generation)
  - Peugeot Partner (2018–present)
  - Peugeot Rifter (2018–present)
  - Opel/Vauxhall Combo (2018–present)
  - Toyota ProAce City (2019–present)
  - Fiat Doblò (2022–present)
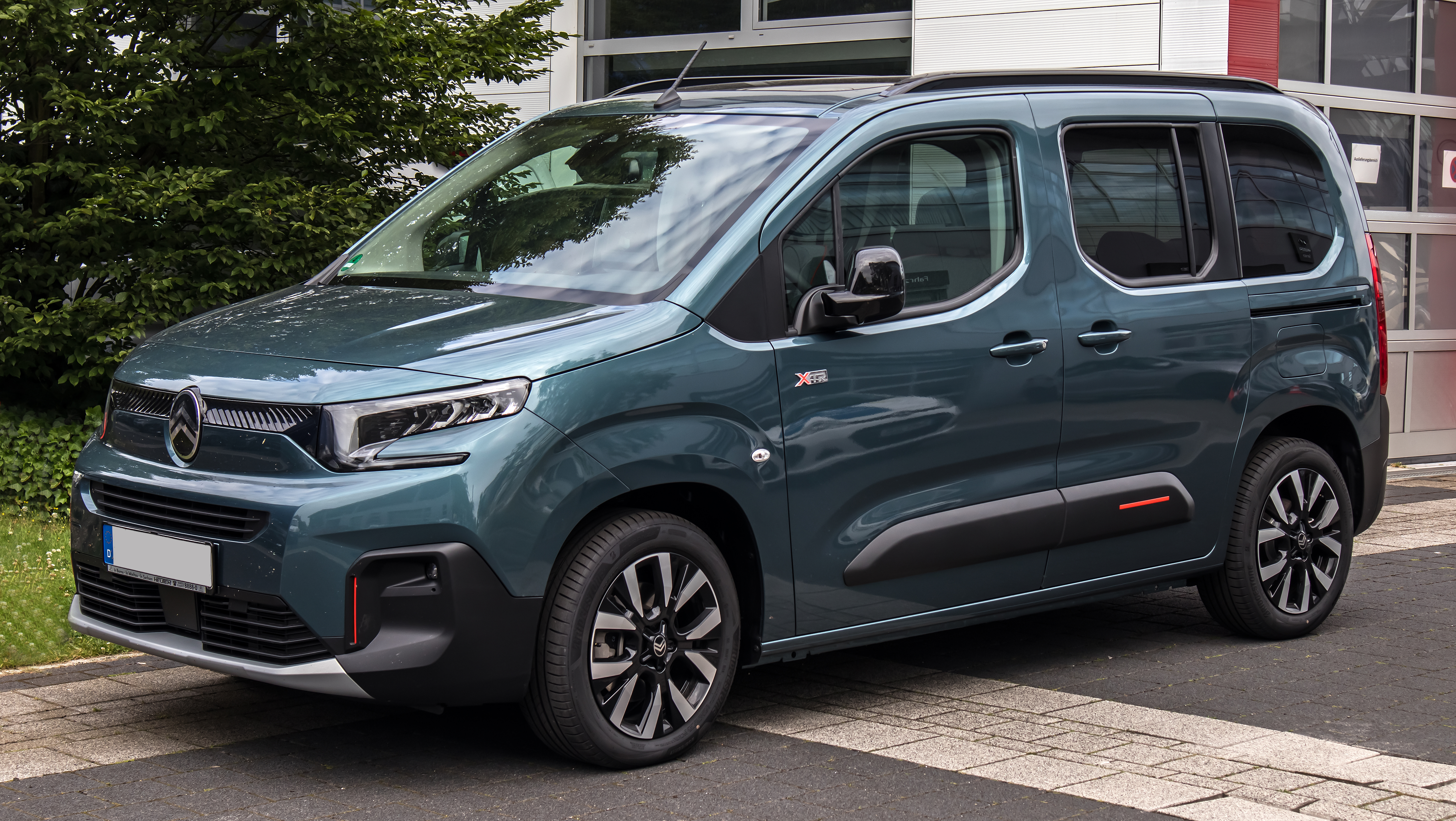
Citroën Berlingo III

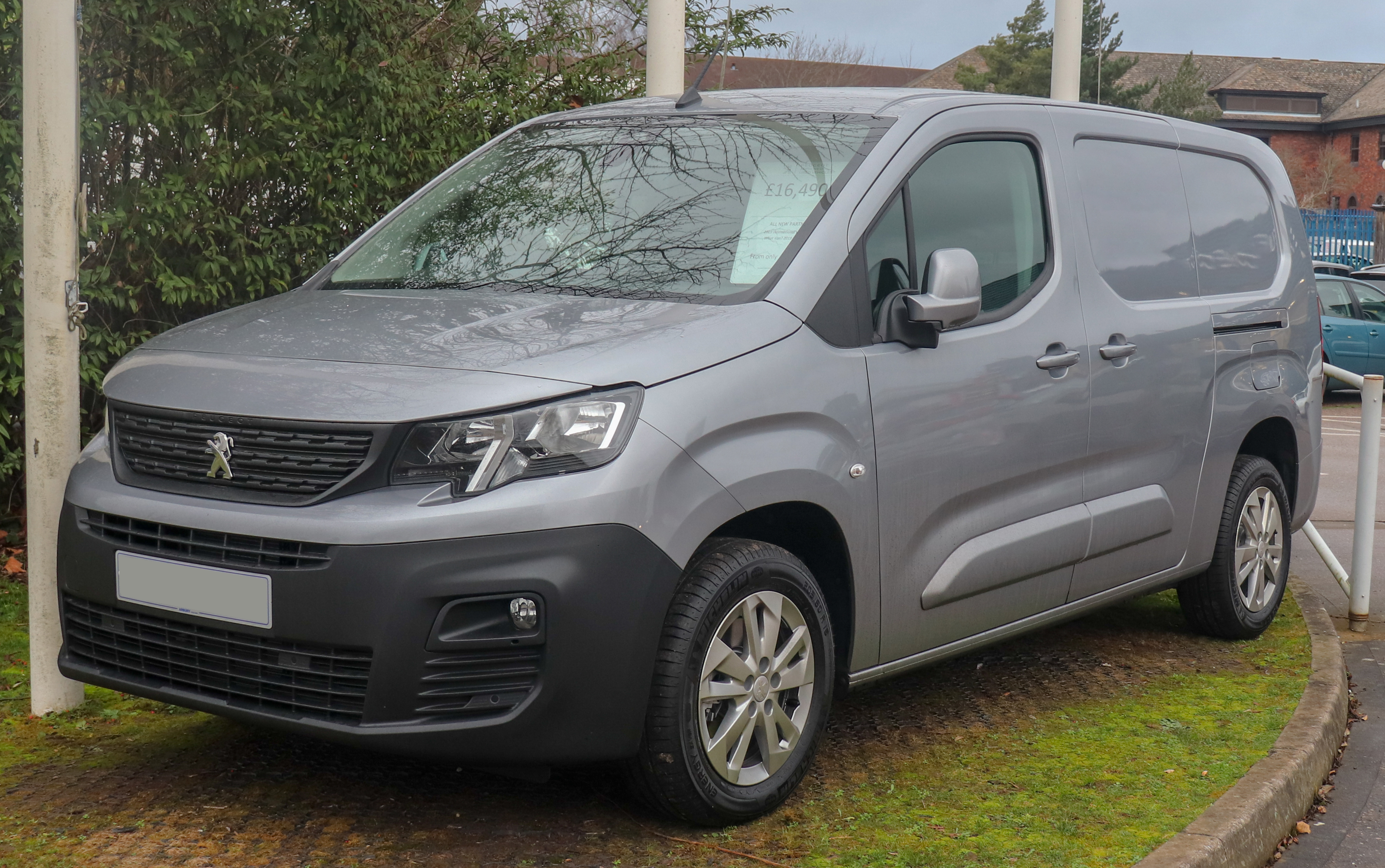
Peugeot Partner

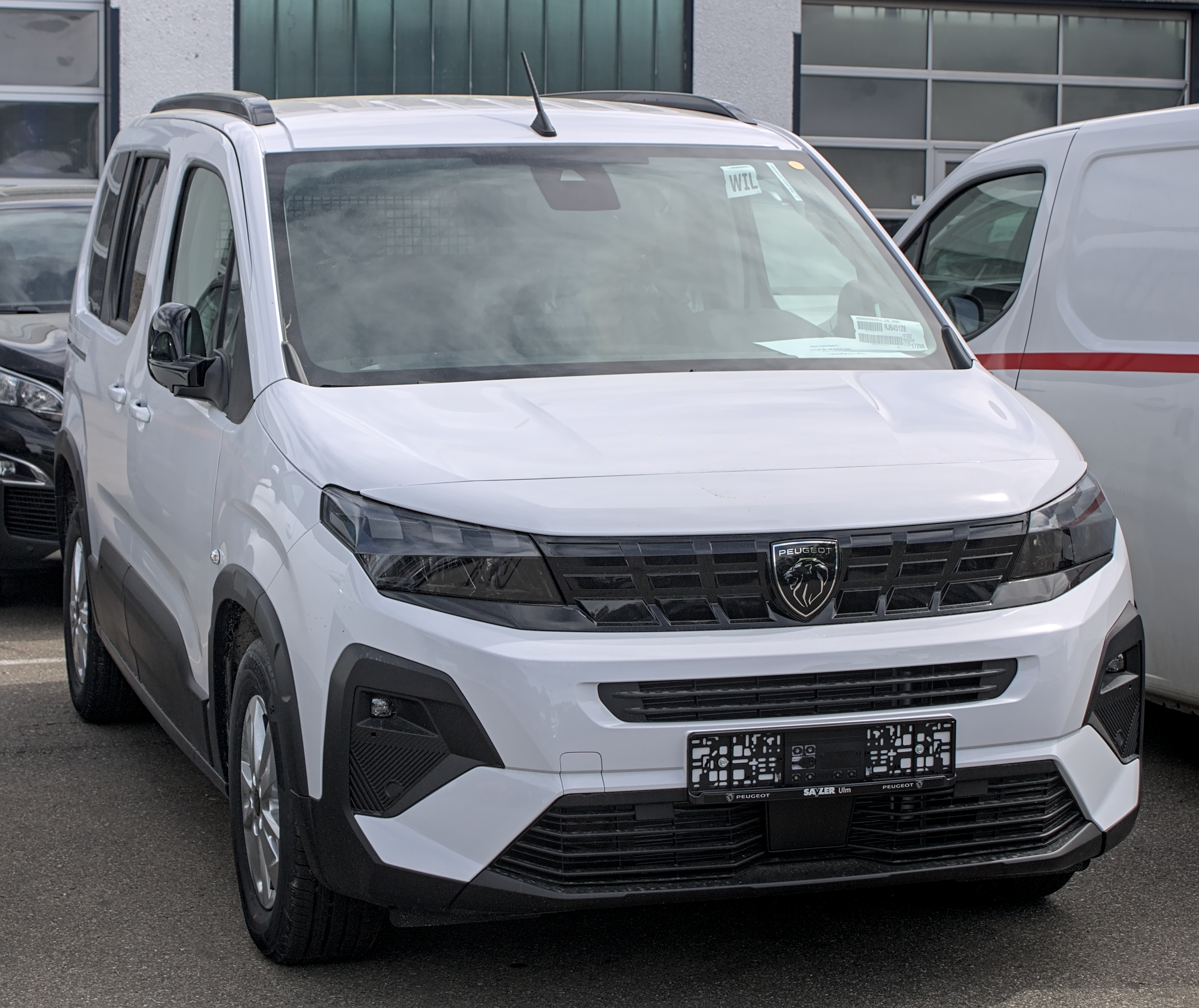
Peugeot Rifter

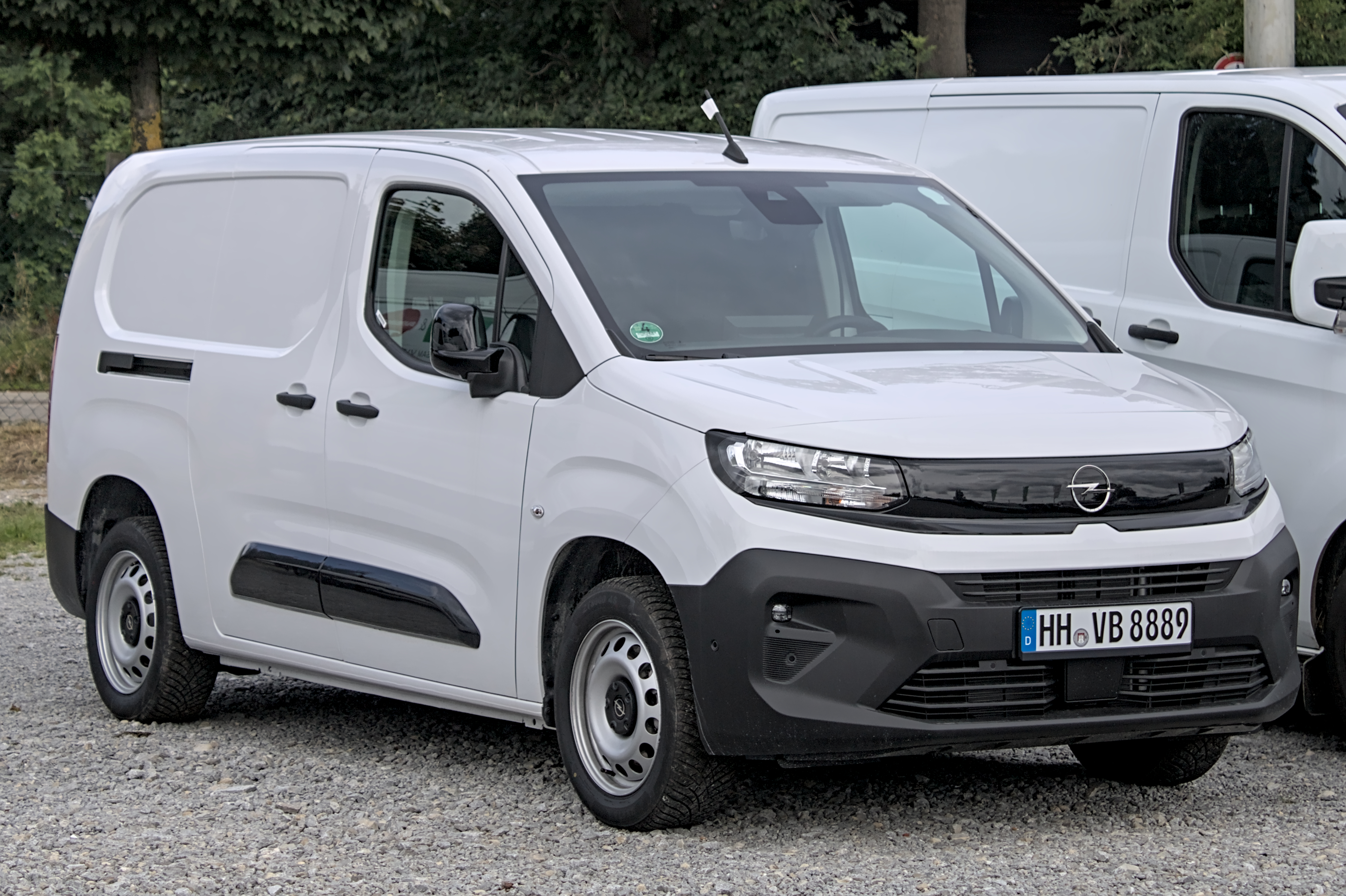
Opel/Vauxhall Combo

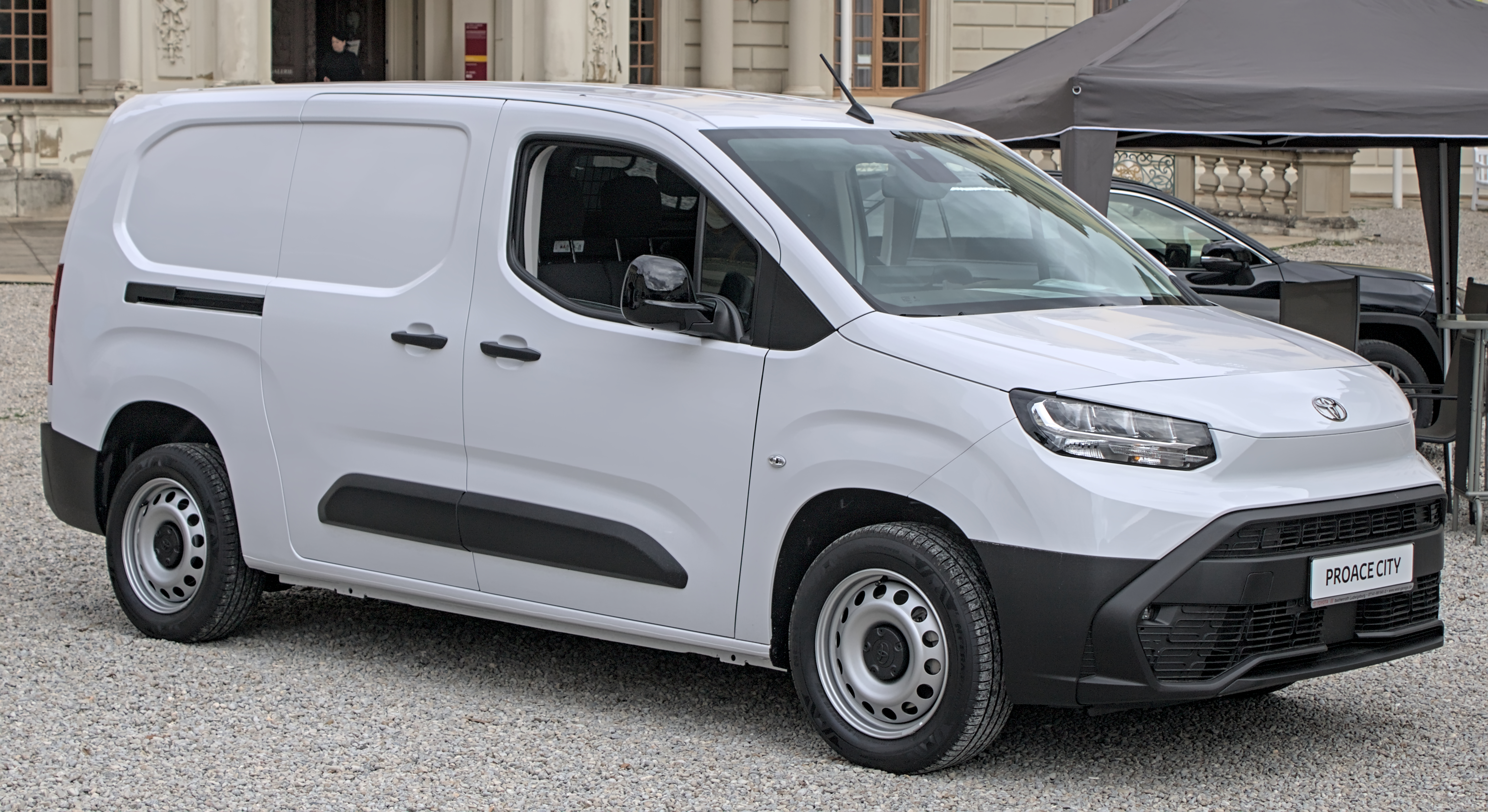
Toyota ProAce City

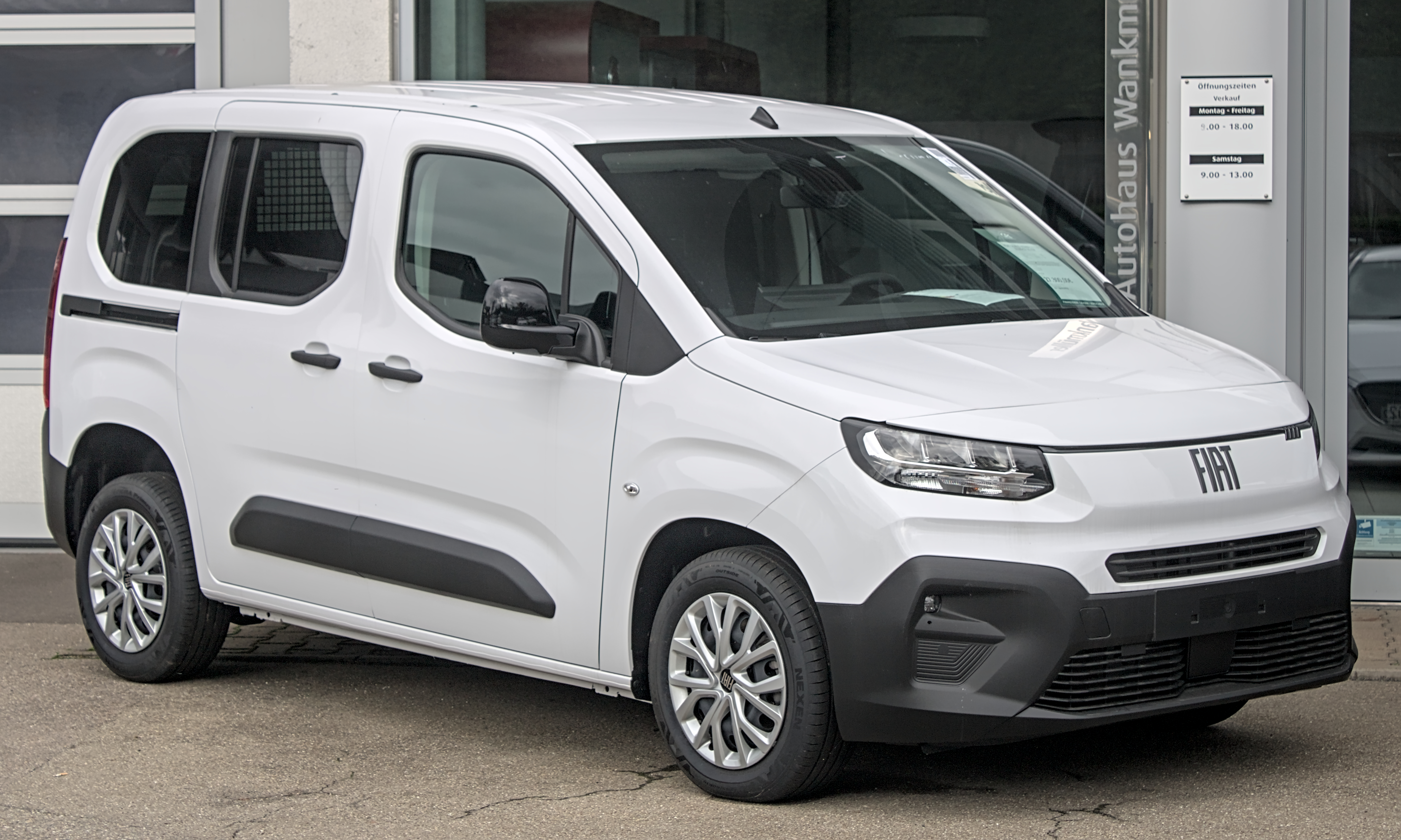
Fiat Doblò

=== K0 platform ===
- Citroën Jumpy III (2016–present)
  - Citroën Dispatch (2016–present)
  - Citroën SpaceTourer (2016–present)
  - Peugeot Expert (2016–present)
  - Peugeot Traveller (2016–present)
  - Toyota ProAce (2016–present)
  - Toyota ProAce Verso (2016–present)
  - Opel/Vauxhall Vivaro (2019–present)
  - Opel Zafira Life (2019–present)
  - Fiat Scudo (2022–present)
  - Fiat Ulysse (2022–present)
  - Iveco eJolly (2025-present)
  - Ram Promaster City (2026-present)
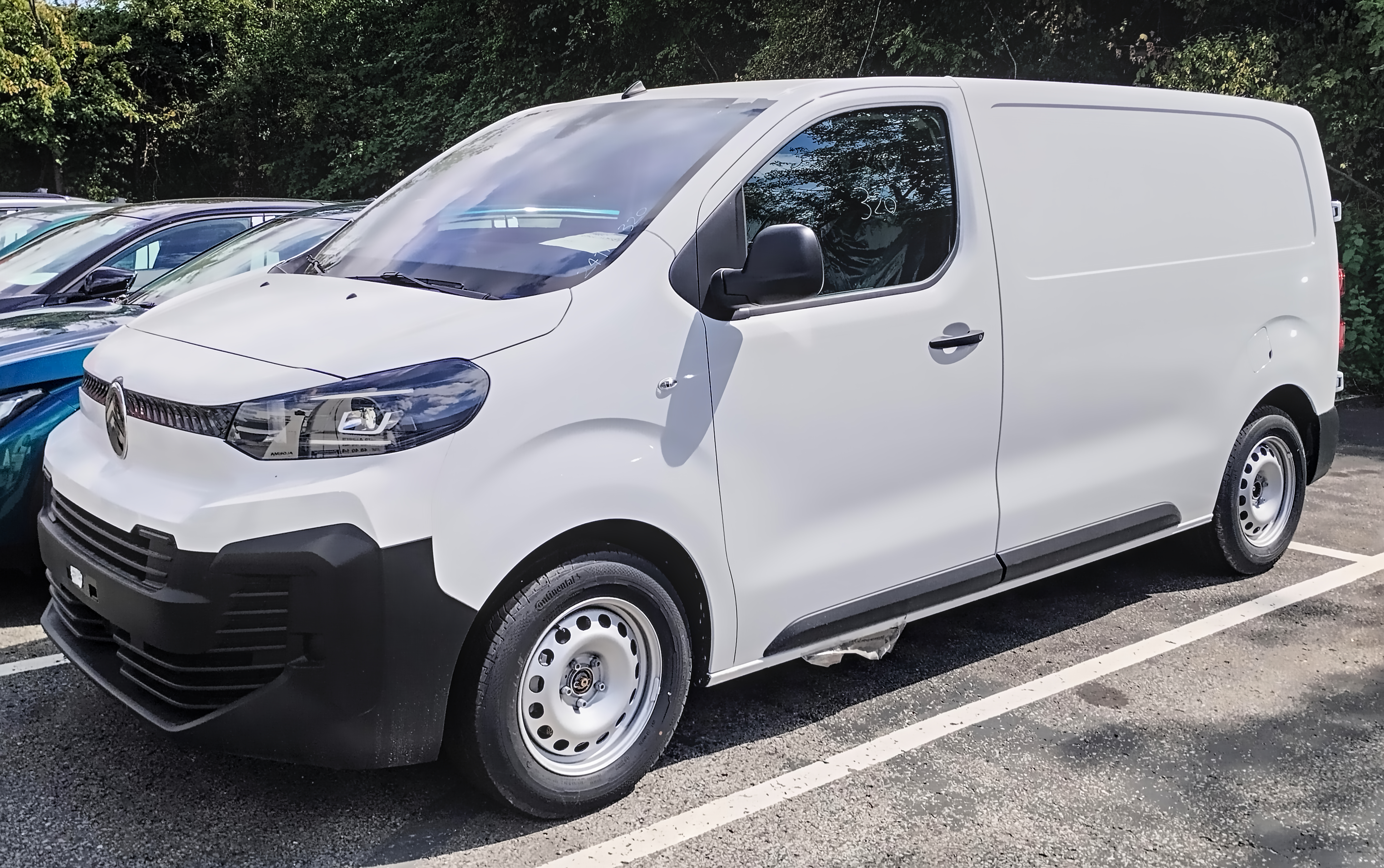
Citroën Jumpy III

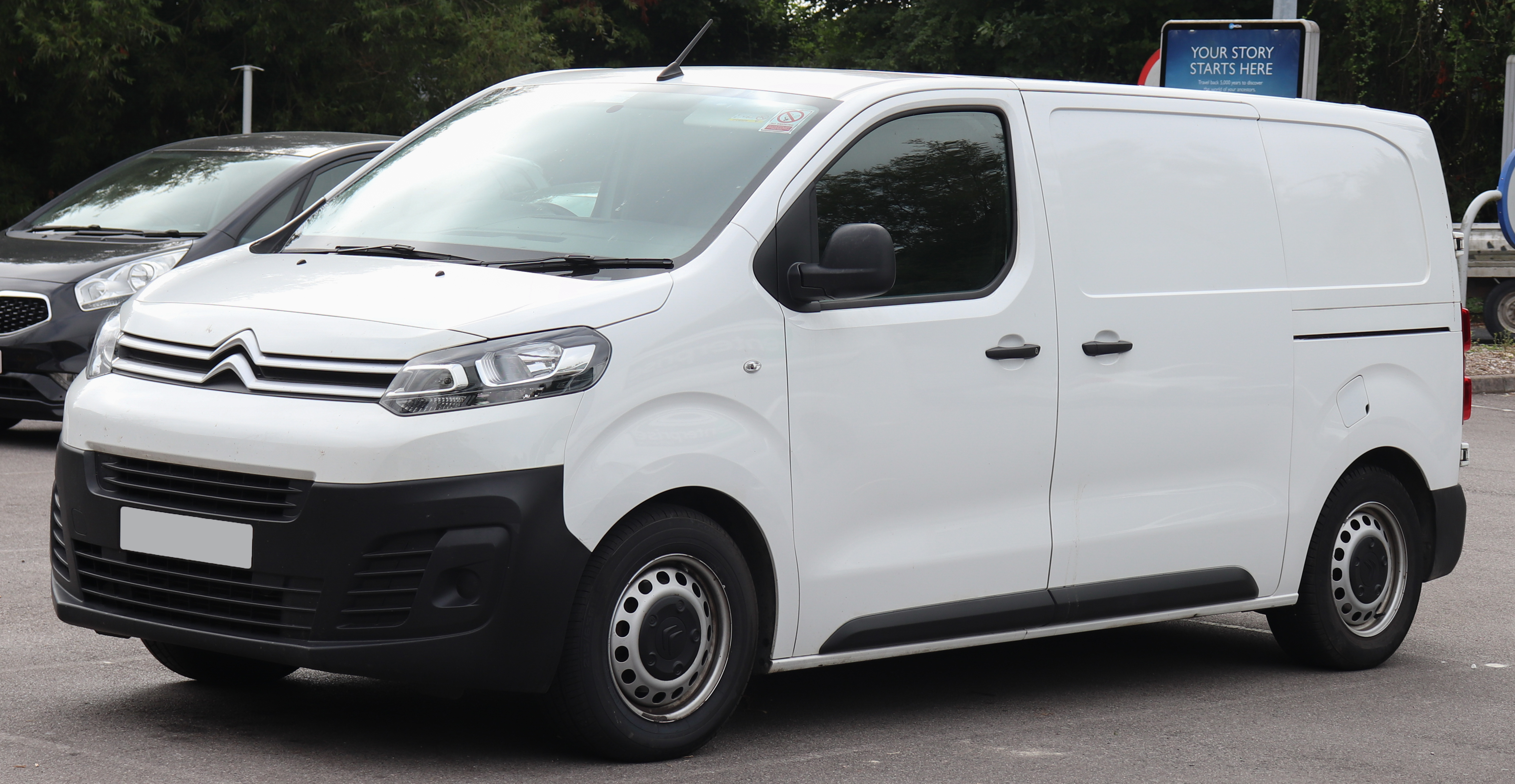
Citroën Dispatch

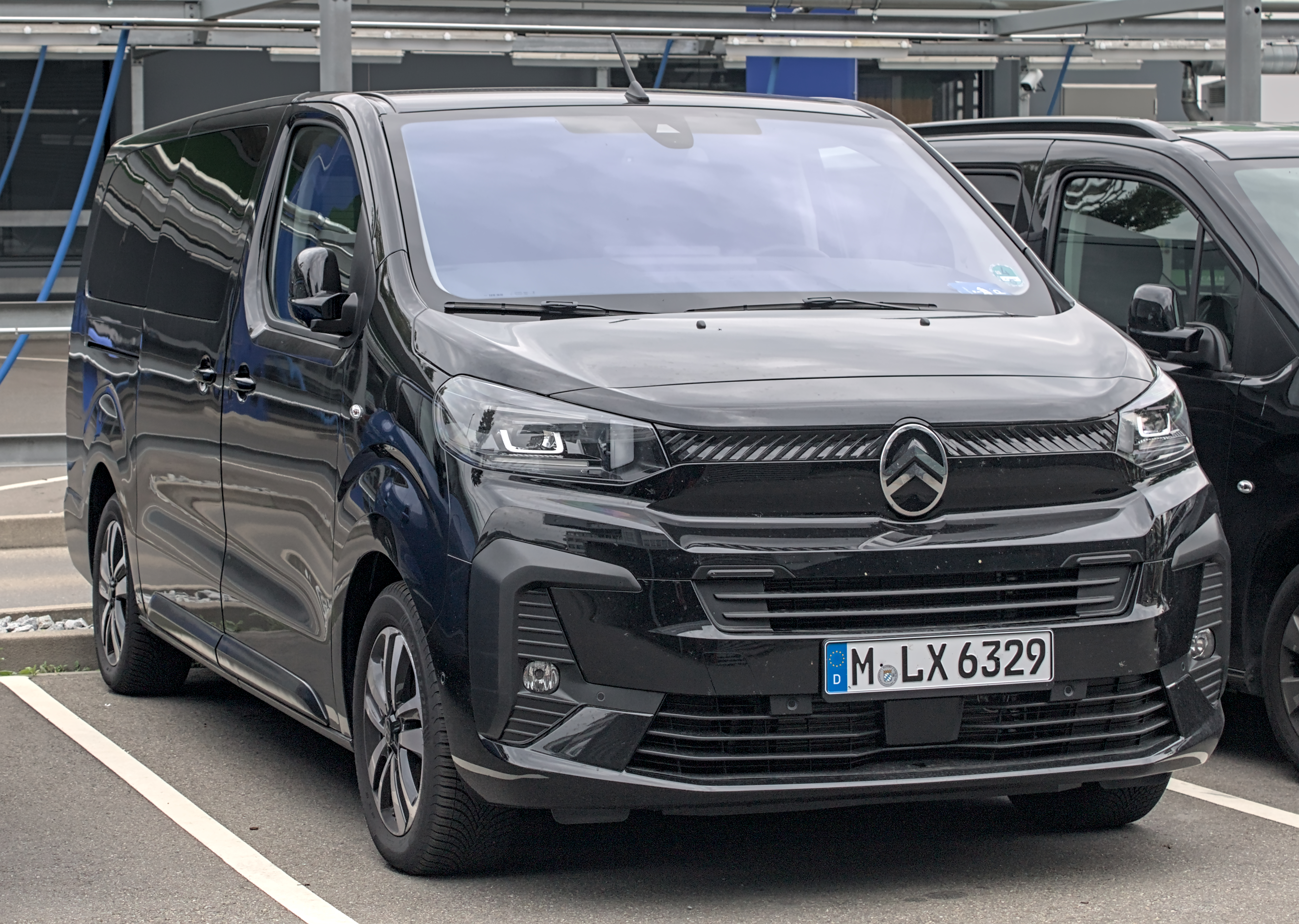
Citroën SpaceTourer

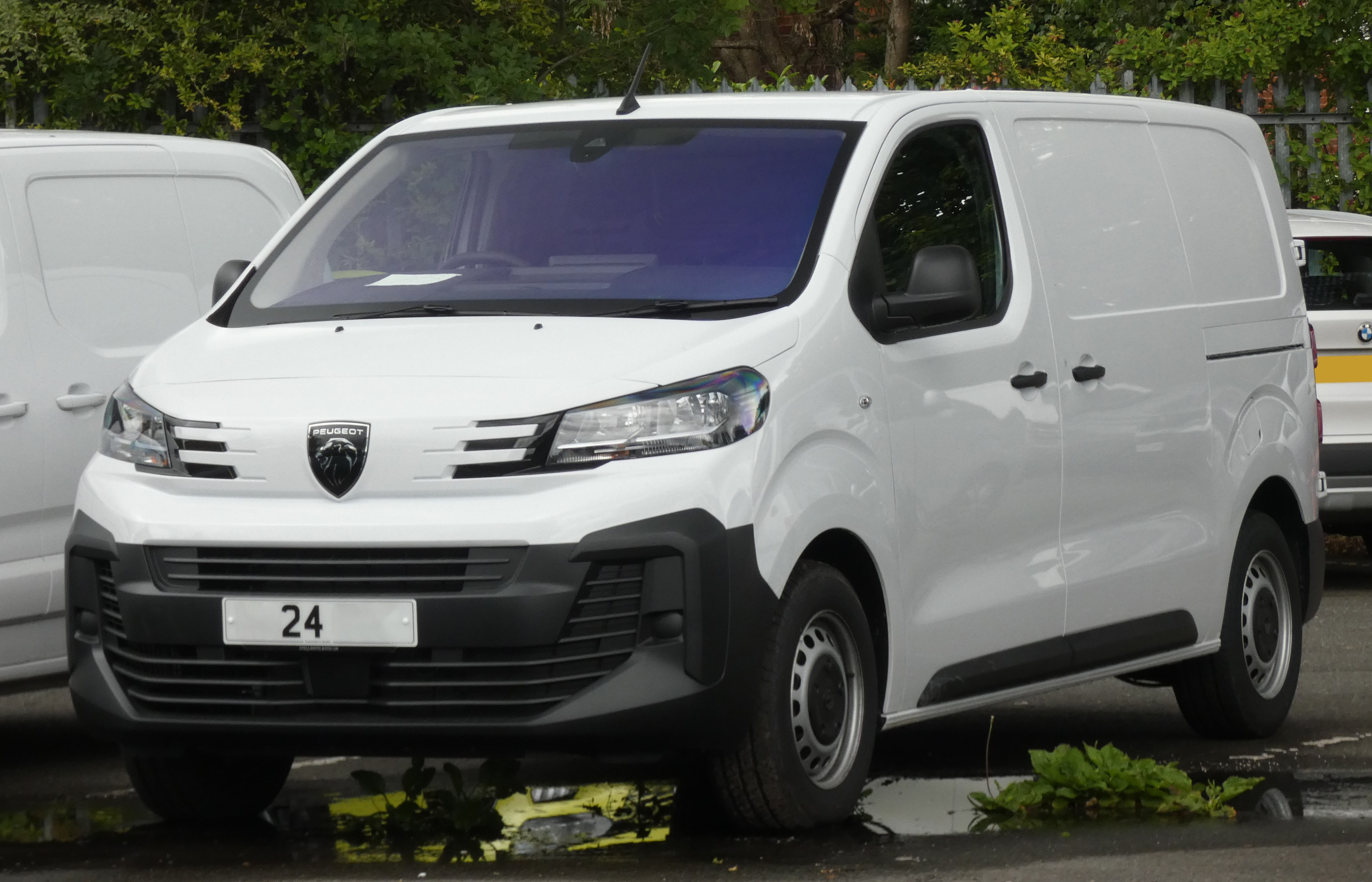
Peugeot Expert

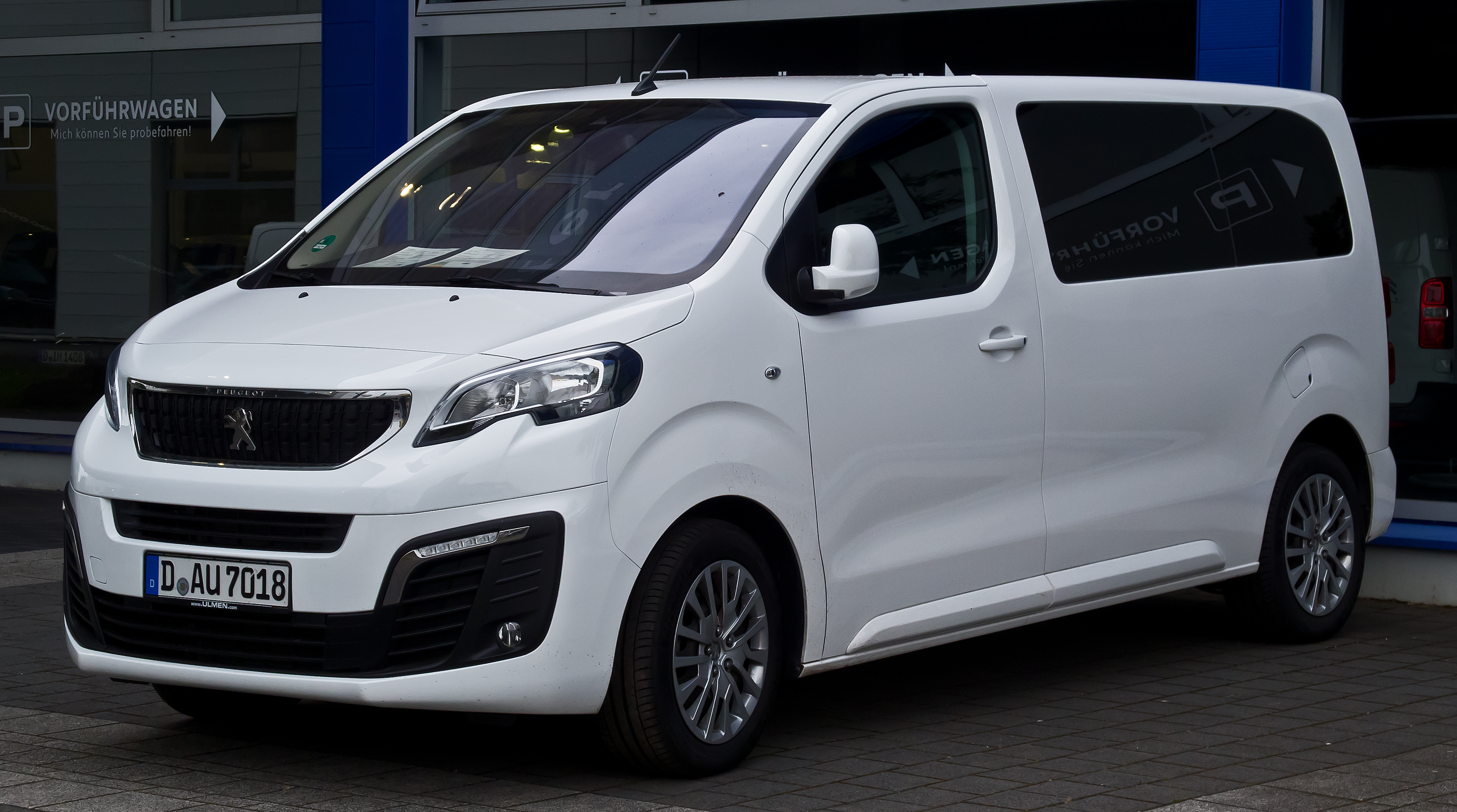
Peugeot Traveller

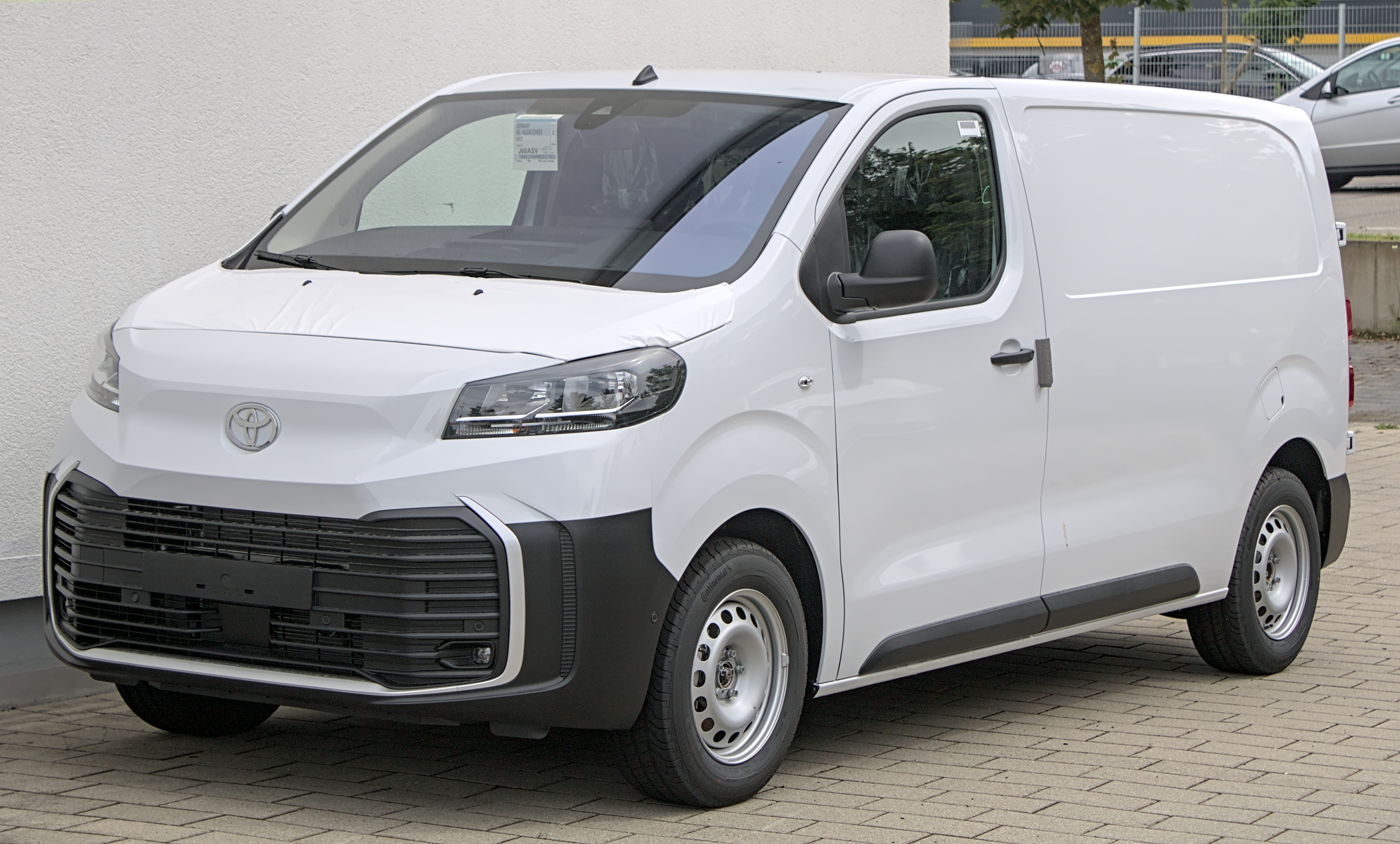
Toyota ProAce

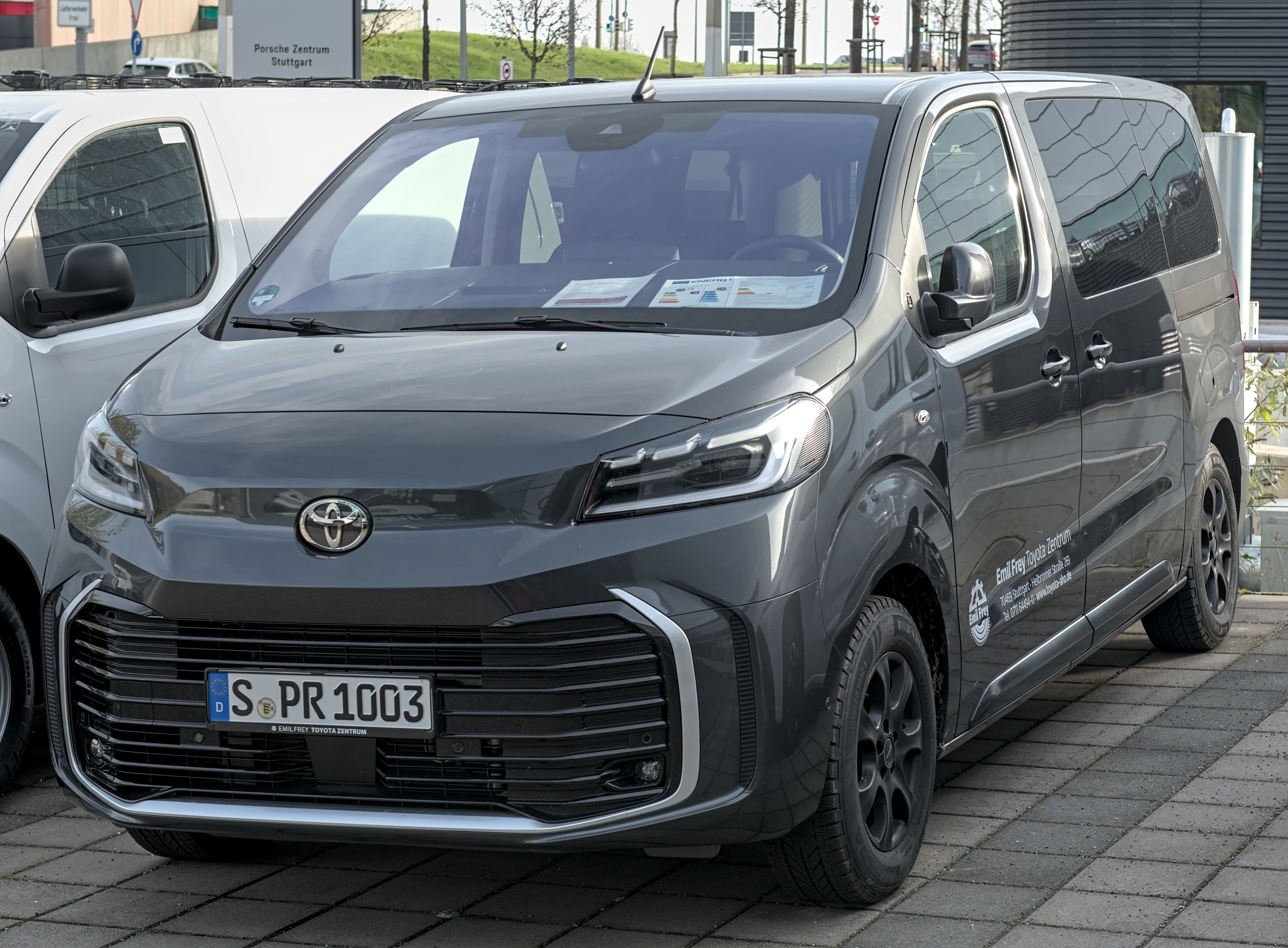
Toyota ProAce Verso

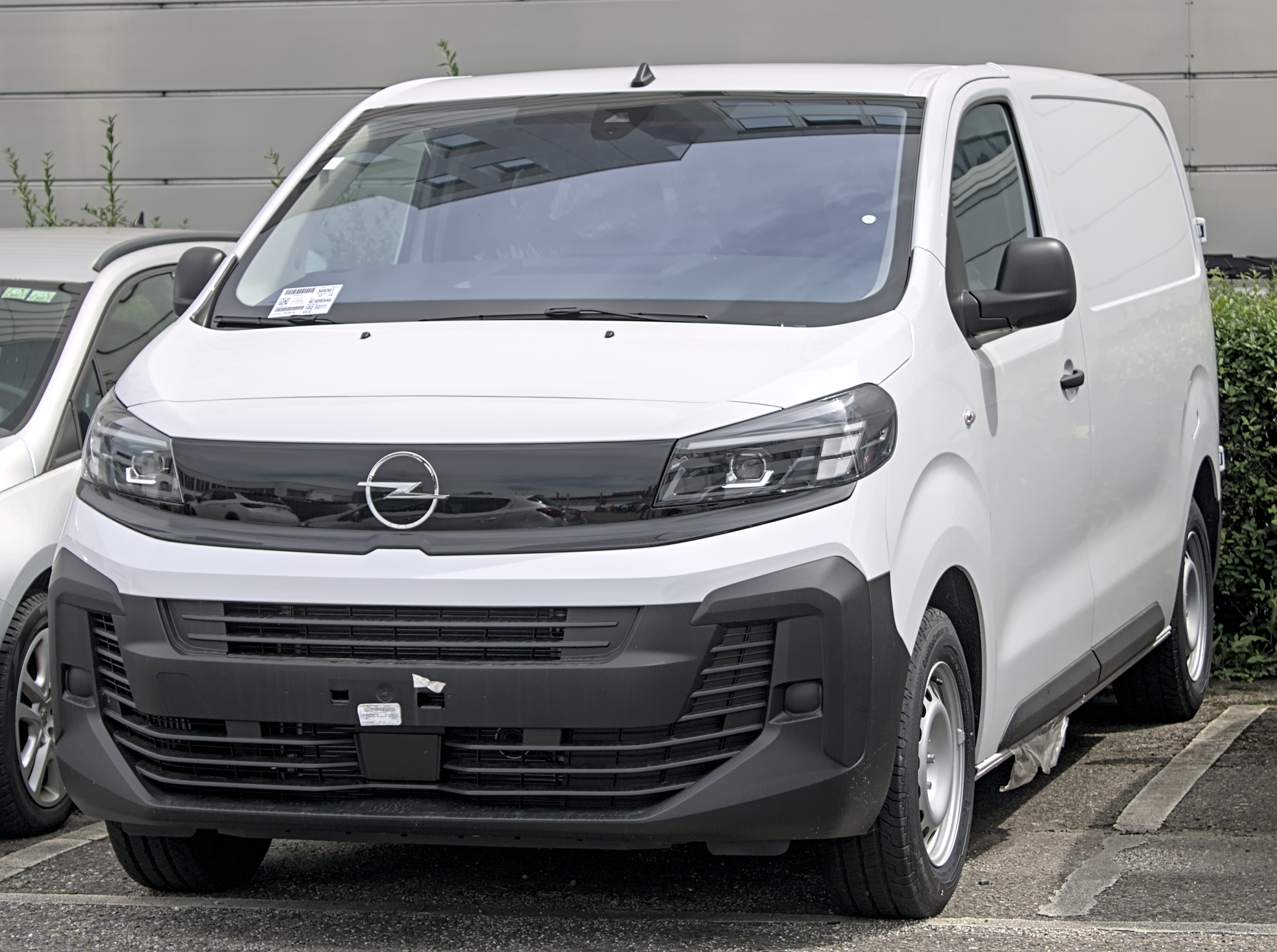
Opel/Vauxhall Vivaro

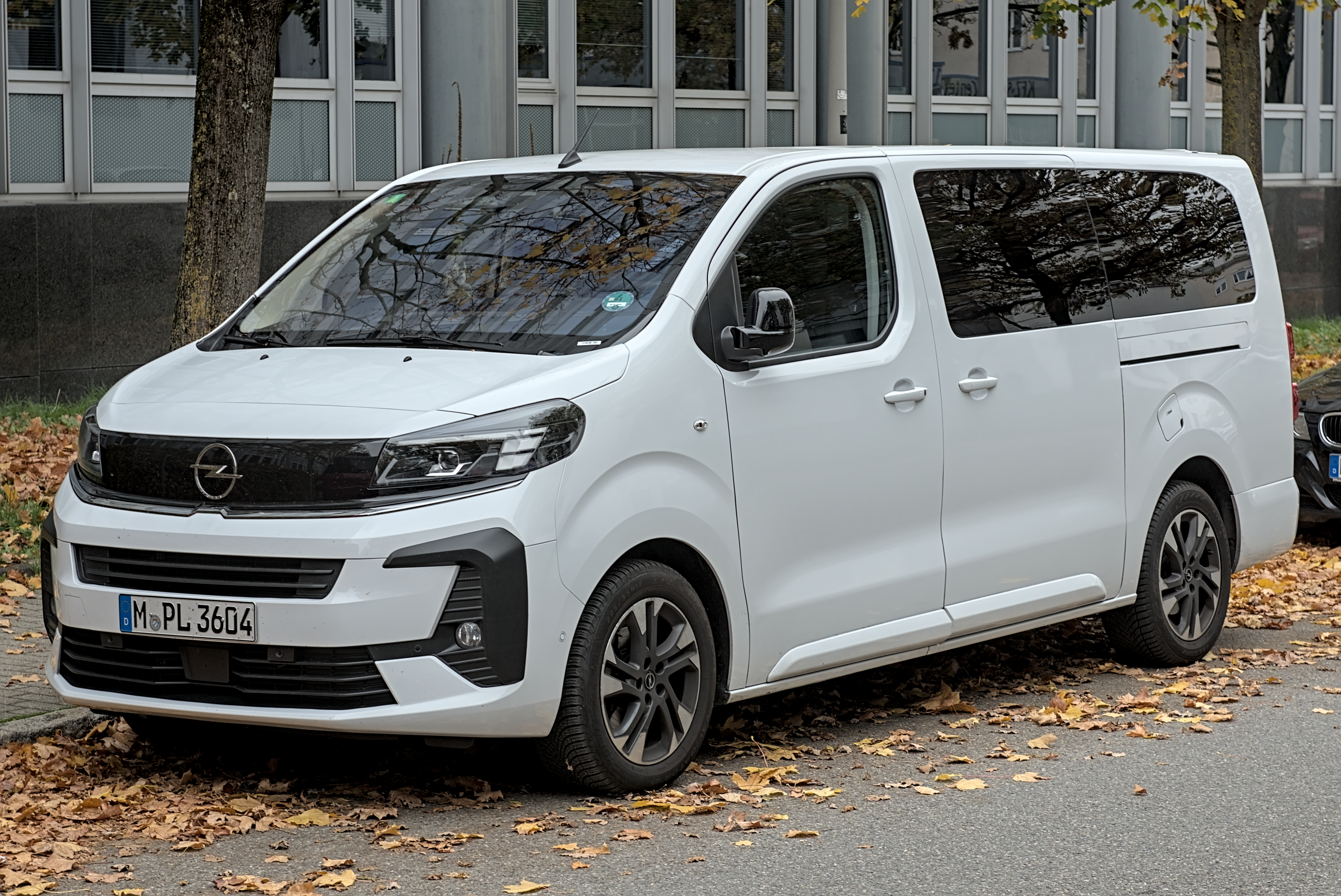
Opel Zafira Life

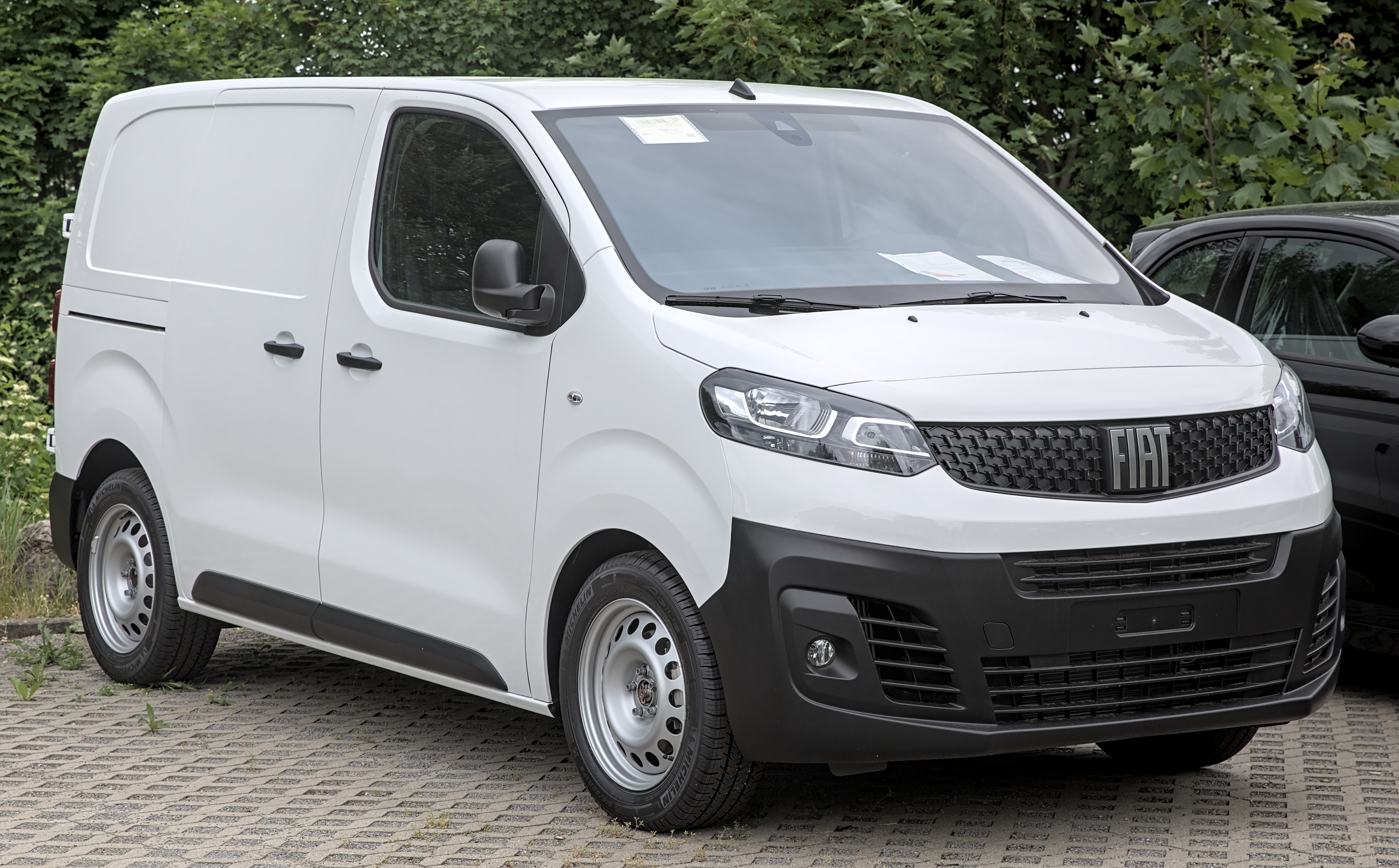
Fiat Scudo

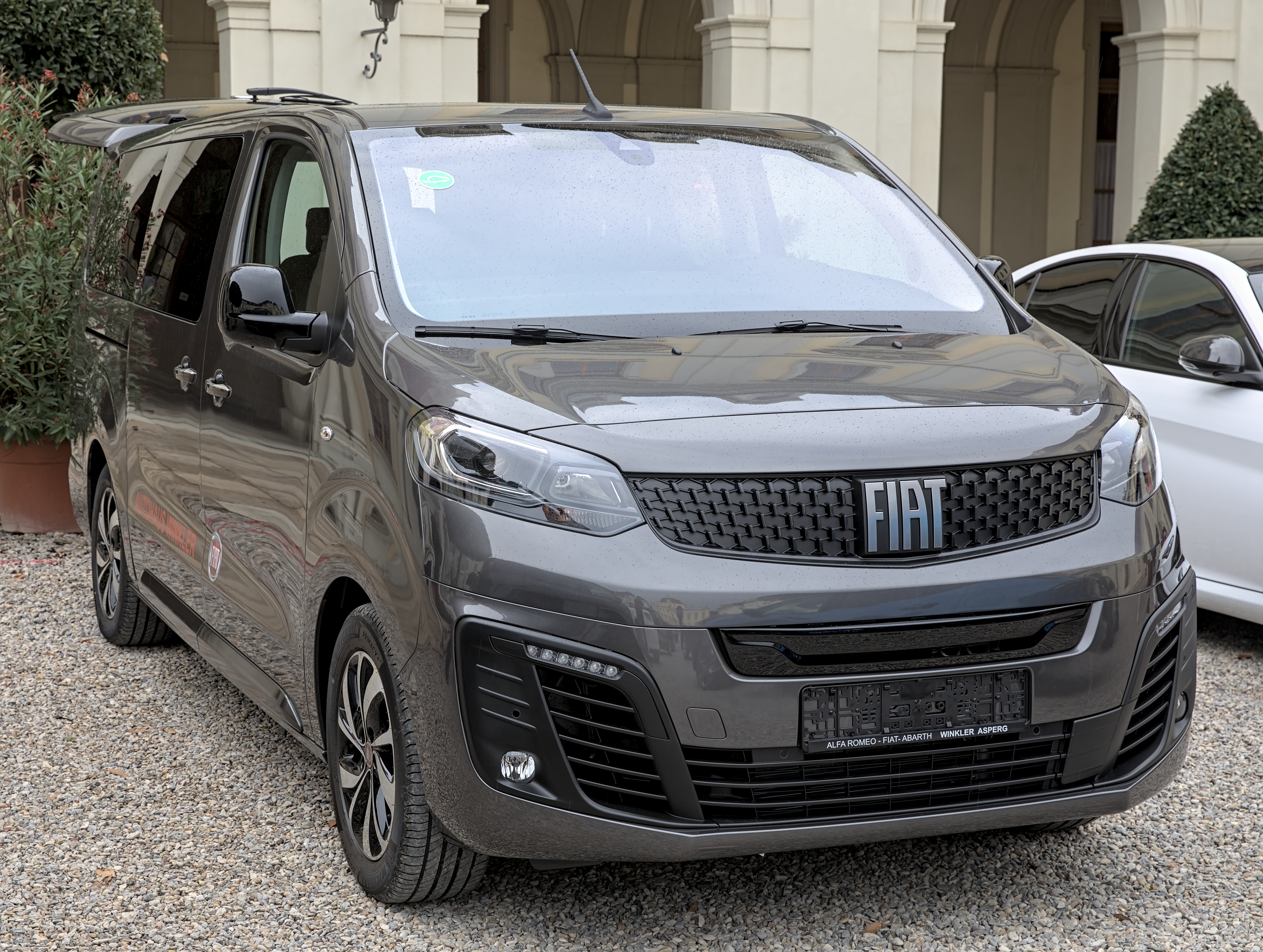
Fiat Ulysse

== See also ==
- List of Stellantis platforms
- List of PSA platforms
- List of Fiat platforms
