= Jean-Pierre Ploué =

French car designer (born 1962)

Jean-Pierre Ploué is a French car designer, known for his work for Renault, Volkswagen, Ford and notably Citroën, where he is attributed with reinvigorating the brand's reputation for innovative styling. He is currently Chief Designer with Stellantis — which includes the Abarth, Alfa Romeo, Citroen, DS, Fiat Europe, Lancia, Opel, Peugeot, and Vauxhall brands.

During his tenure with Renault, one of Ploué's initial sketches was chosen for development by Patrick le Quément as the 1994 Renault Argos. The concept was noticed by Freeman Thomas at the 1994 Geneva Motor Show, and Thomas later cited the Argos as the inspiration for his initial Audi TT sketches.

In 2008, a panel of 40 automotive journalists with Journal de l’Automobile, France's largest automotive magazine, named Ploué Man of the Year (Homme de l'Année).

== Background ==
Ploué was born 8 September, 1962 in Migennes, France — the son of Charles Ploué, a sales rep, and Michelle Grulet Ploué, a nursery school director. As a child, he was known to carry small toy cars in his pockets. He later developed an interest in cabinetmaking and design.

Ploué attended the Jules Haag high school in Besançon and graduated in 1985 from ENSAAMA, the French National School of Applied Arts and Crafts — at the top of his graduating class. Despite the school's lack of an automotive curriculum, he and his closest classmates made full scale car drawings — only to have them painted over by their professors.

Ploué married Sophie Rouxel on January 21, 1995 and they have four children. His interests include gastronomy, oenology, painting, architecture, sculpture, watchmaking, and he admires designers Philippe Starck, Giovanni Bertone and Jean Nouvel. He has pursued skiing, adventure and motor sports, golf, and mountain biking.

== Career ==
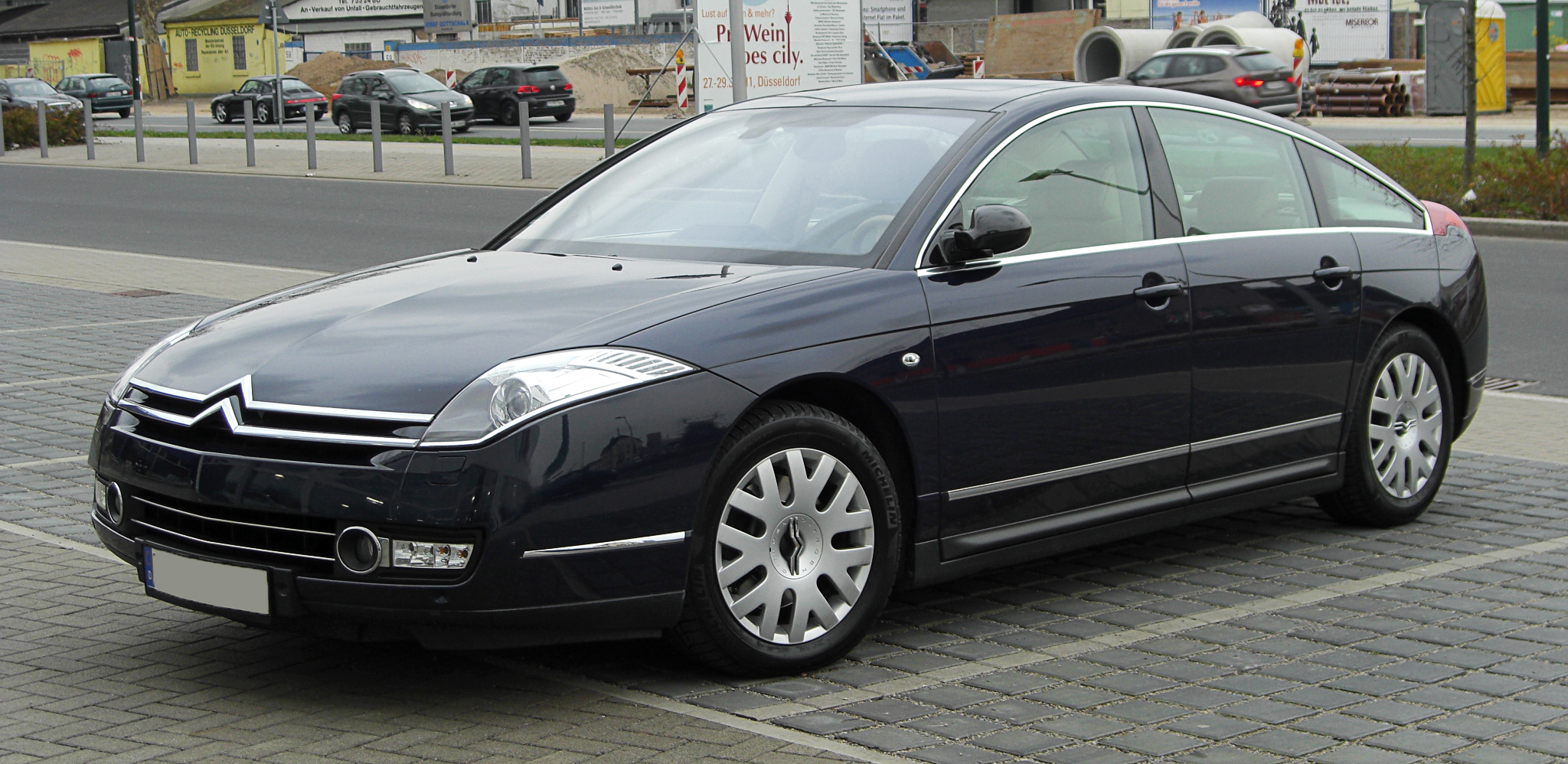
Citroën C6 Well

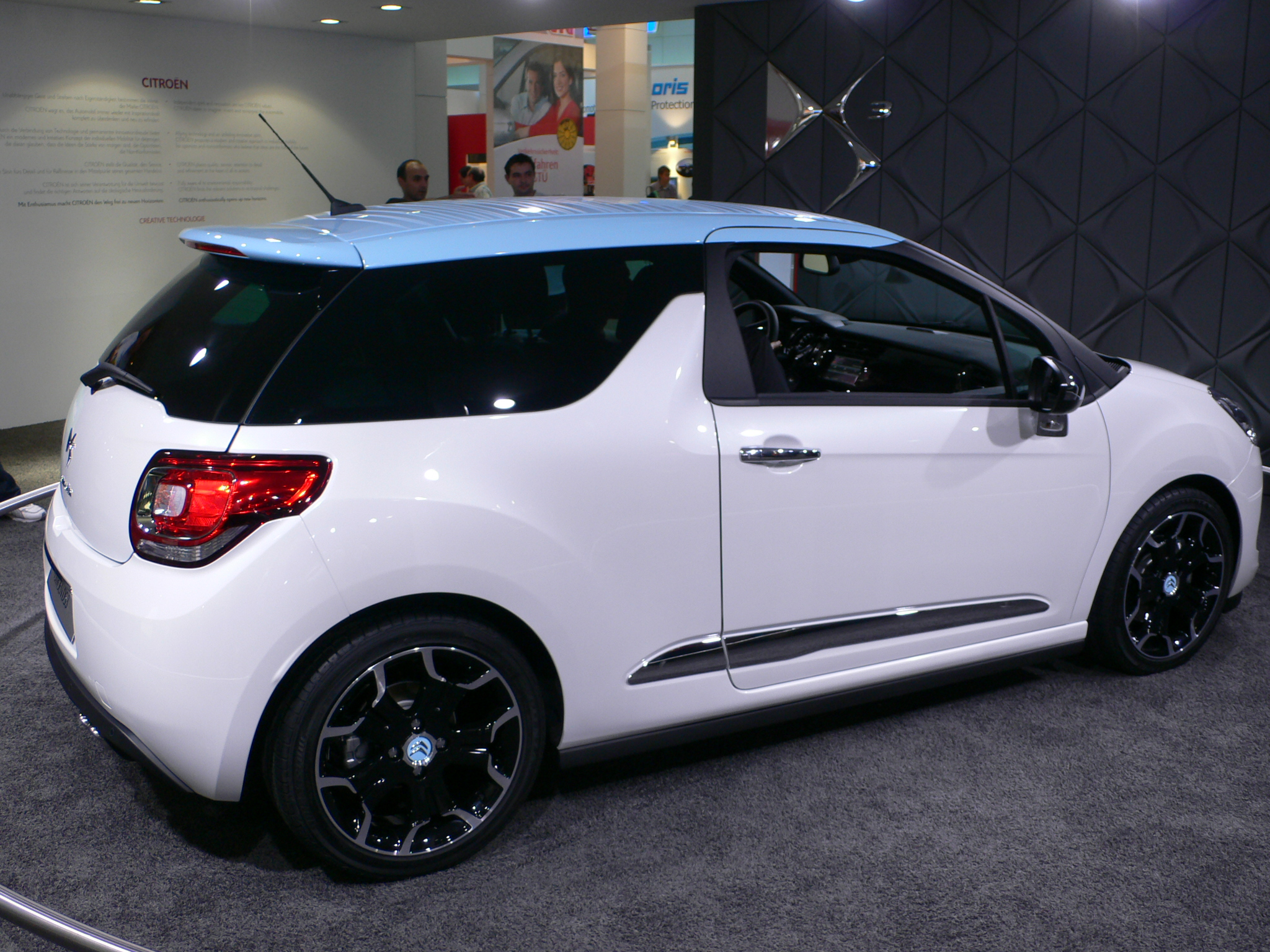
Citroën DS3 IAA 2009

Ploué started his career at Renault from 1985–1995, where he designed the Laguna concept car, the W06 concept that grew into the Twingo, and worked on the design of the Renault Clio II and Megane I.

From 1995 to 1998 he worked at the Volkswagen Design Centre in Wolfsburg, Germany. From 1998 to 1999 Ploué was Head of Exterior Design at Ford in Cologne, Germany.

In 1999 Ploué replaced Arthur Blakeslee as Head of the Citroën Design Centre, responsible for rejuvenating the brand's image. His arrival marked a new era for Citroën, resulting in the launch of successful and stylish new models such as the C4, the second generation C5, the C6, and the DS3, which played a strong role in the rebranding of the marque. Concept-cars C-Sport Lounge, C-Métisse, Citroën Metropolis and GT by Citroën designed by his team show their desire to resume their position as a leader in car design.

In 2009, he was promoted to Director of Design for the PSA group, in charge of designers Gilles Vidal from Peugeot and Thierry Métroz from Citroën since early 2010.

Following the Stellantis merger in 2021, he was appointed the group's chief designer for the European region, including for the Lancia and Alfa Romeo brands as part of their revitalisation strategies.

== Awards ==
Ploué received a Design Award for best production car for the Renault Twingo (1992), Design Award for best concept car for the Renault Argos (1993), Louis Vuitton Classic Concept Award for the Citroën C-Métisse (2006), Louis Vuitton Classic Concept Award for the GTbyCitroën.
