= PSA PF3 platform =

The PF3 Platform was developed by engineers at PSA Peugeot Citroën for large- and medium-sized cars with front wheel drive and transverse engine.

The first car to use the PF3 platform was the 2001 Citroën C5. PSA PF3 was a global mid-size platform used by various models produced by Citroën and Peugeot.

PSA began to use the new EMP2 platform (instead of the PF3 platform) for all future models in 2013, starting with the new Peugeot 308, except for collaborations with its partner Dongfeng for models specifically designed for the Chinese market.

It was phased out in 2023 when production of the second-generation Citroën C6 ended.

== Models ==
Vehicles based on the PF3 Platform:

- 2001–2008 Citroën C5 I
- 2004–2010 Peugeot 407
- 2008–2021 Citroën C5 II
- 2005–2012 Citroën C6 I
- 2010–2018 Peugeot 508 I
- 2016–2019 Dongfeng A9 (mix of PF3 and EMP2)
- 2016–2023 Citroën C6 II (mix of PF3 and EMP2)
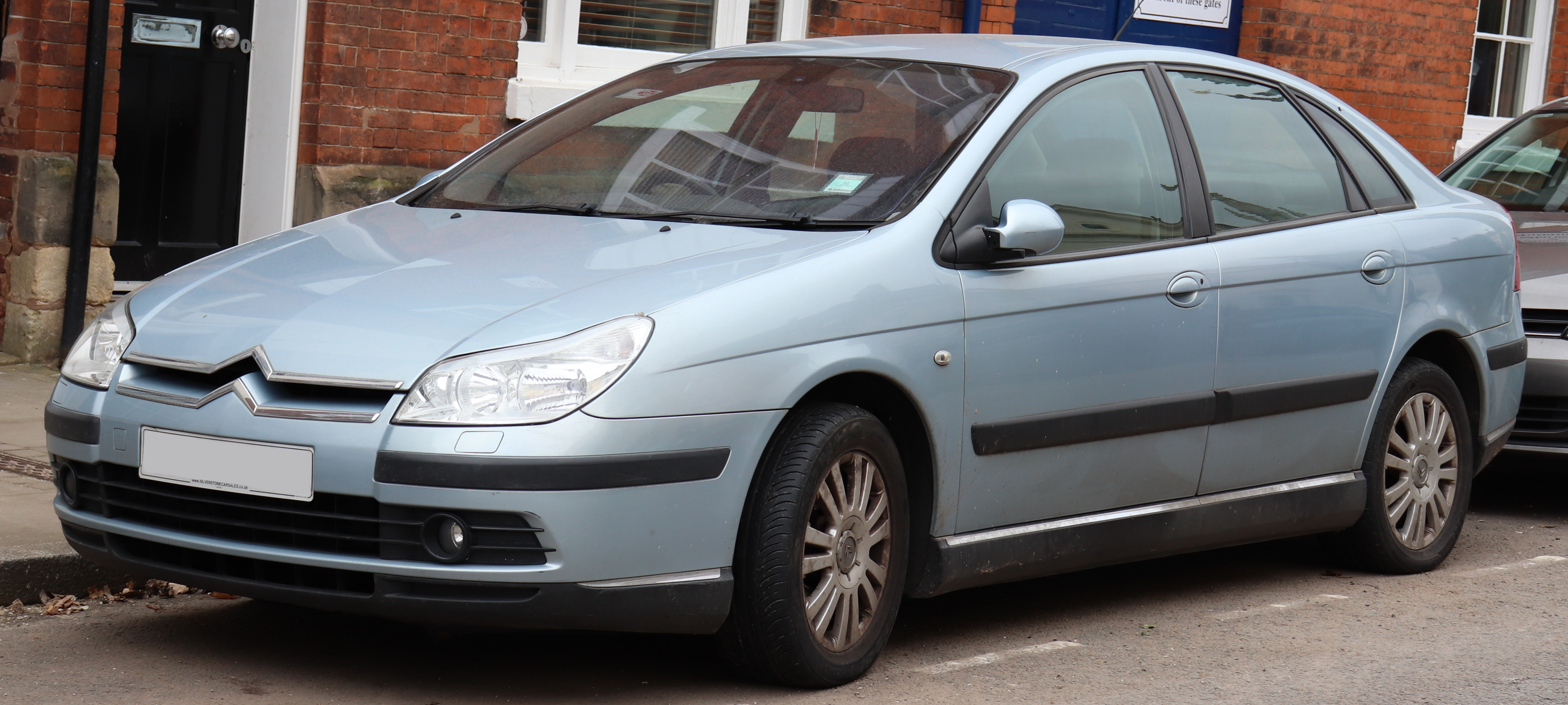
Citroën C5 I

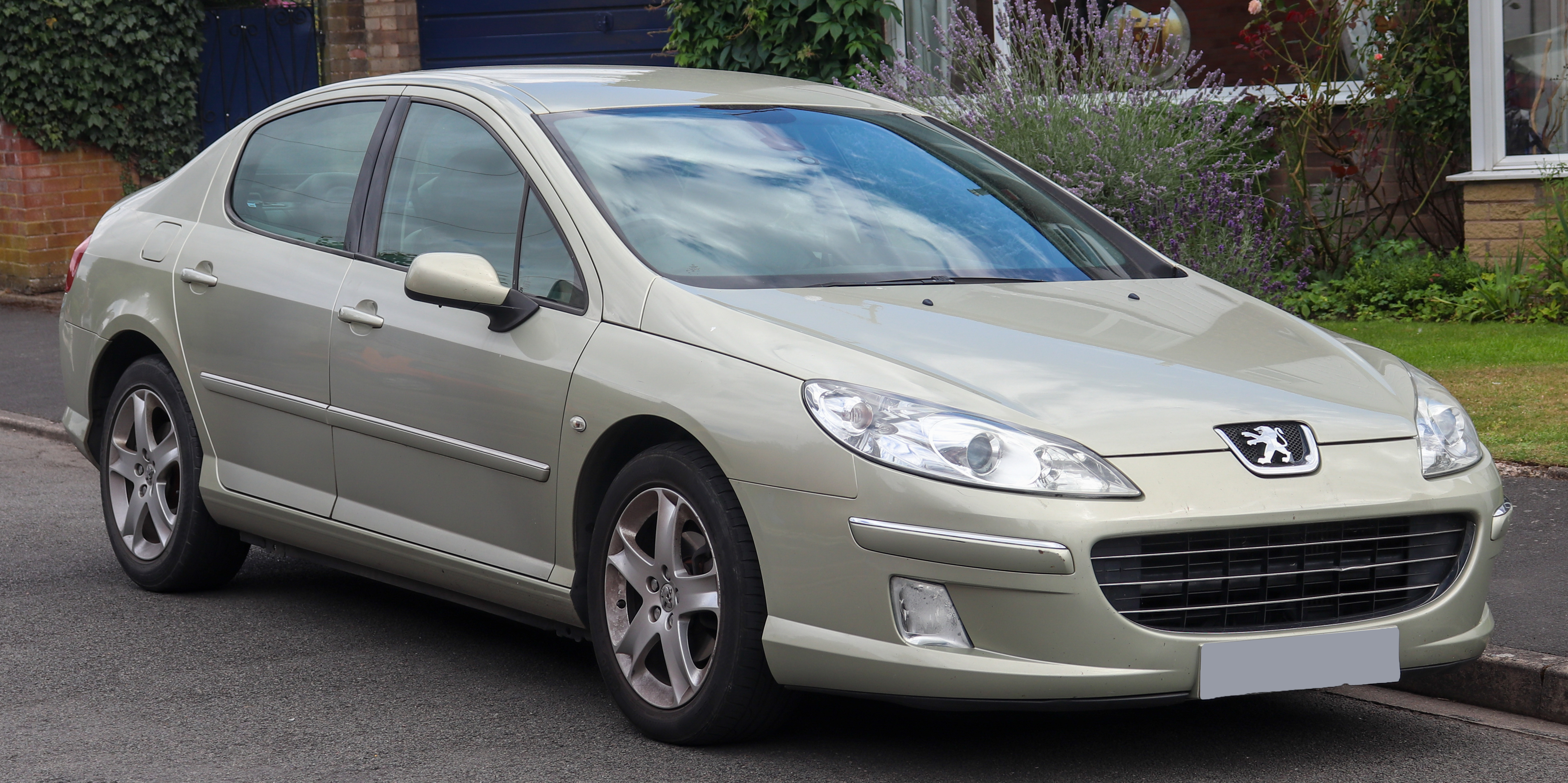
Peugeot 407

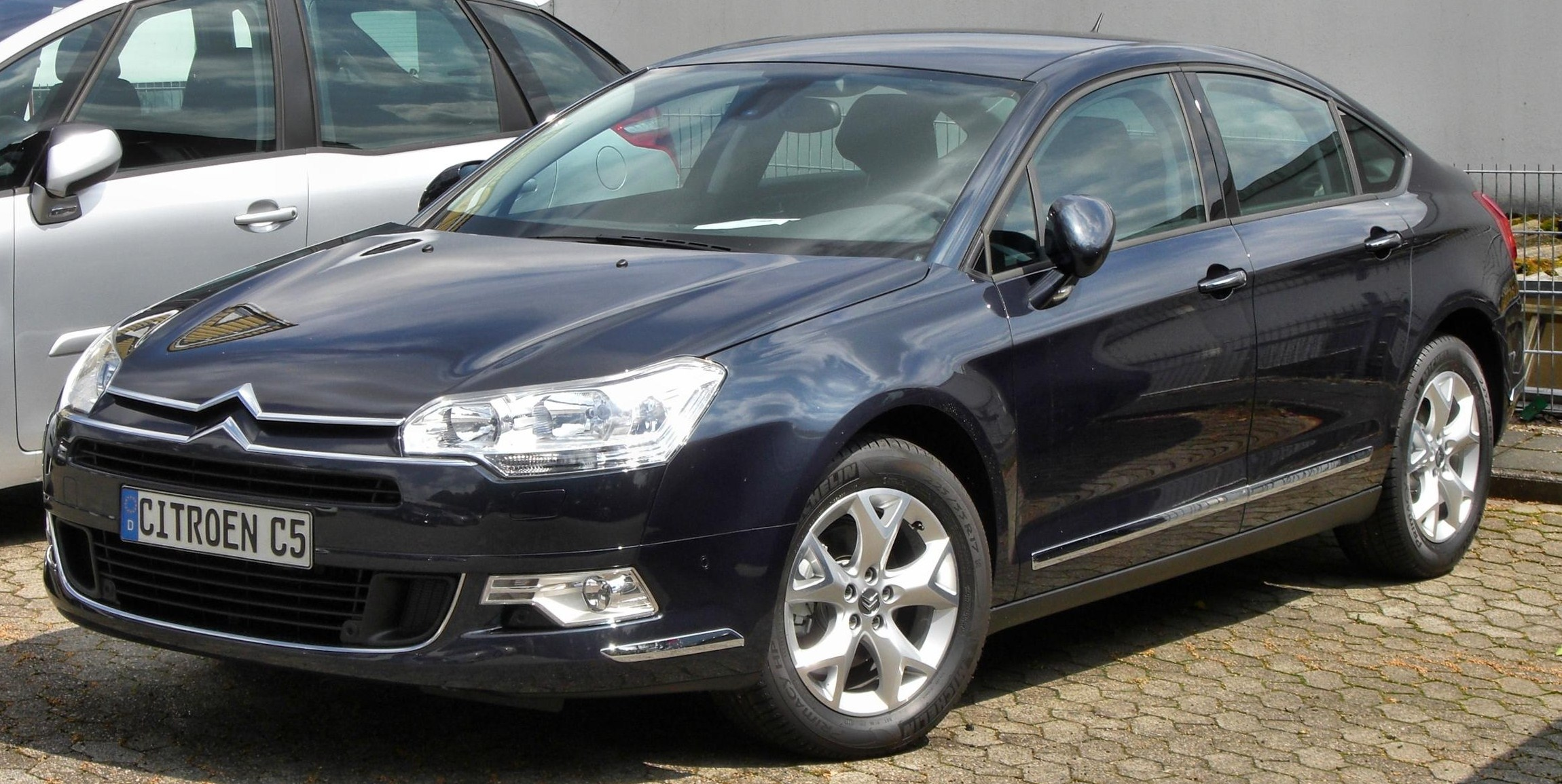
Citroën C5 II

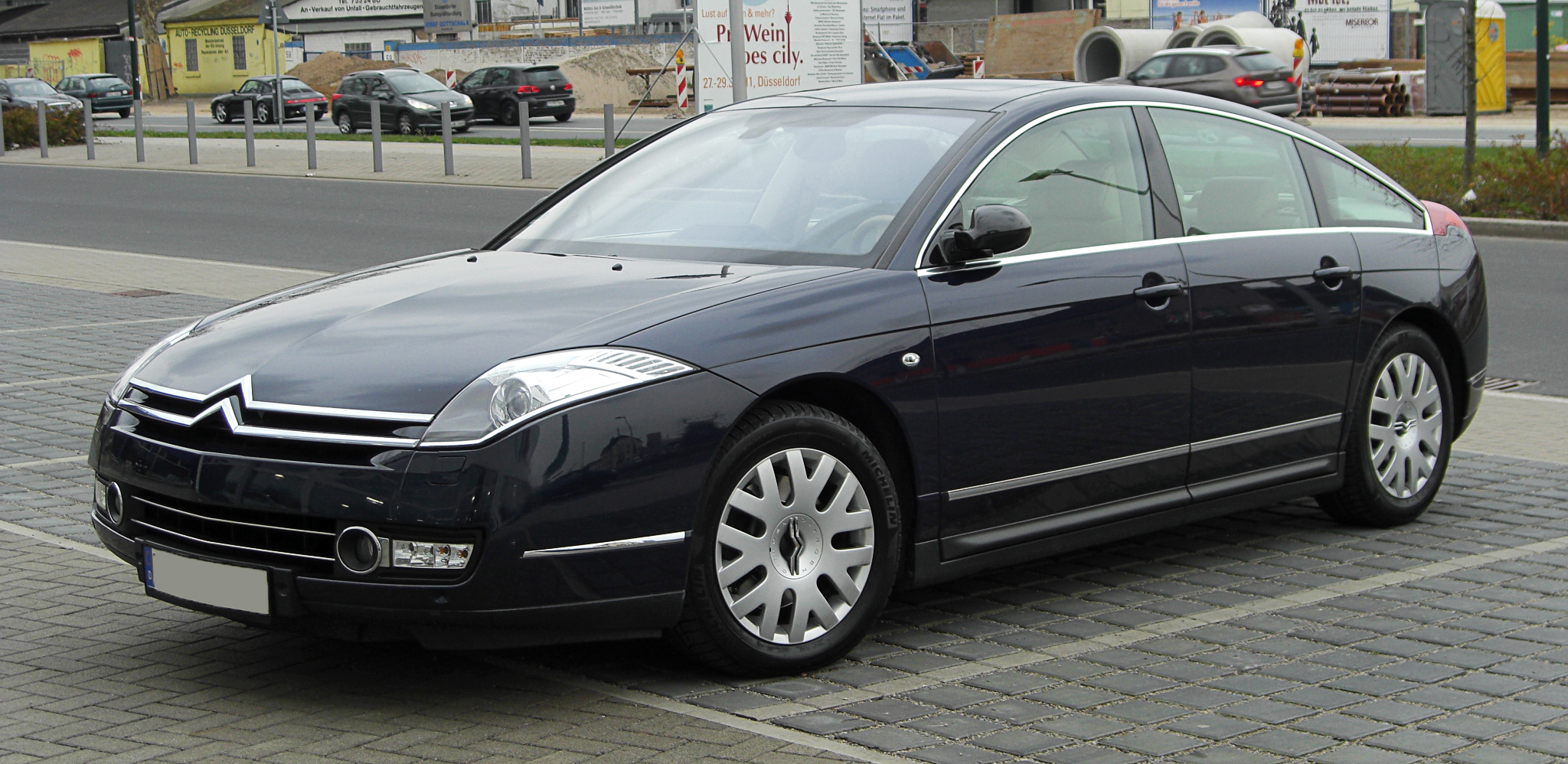
Citroën C6 I

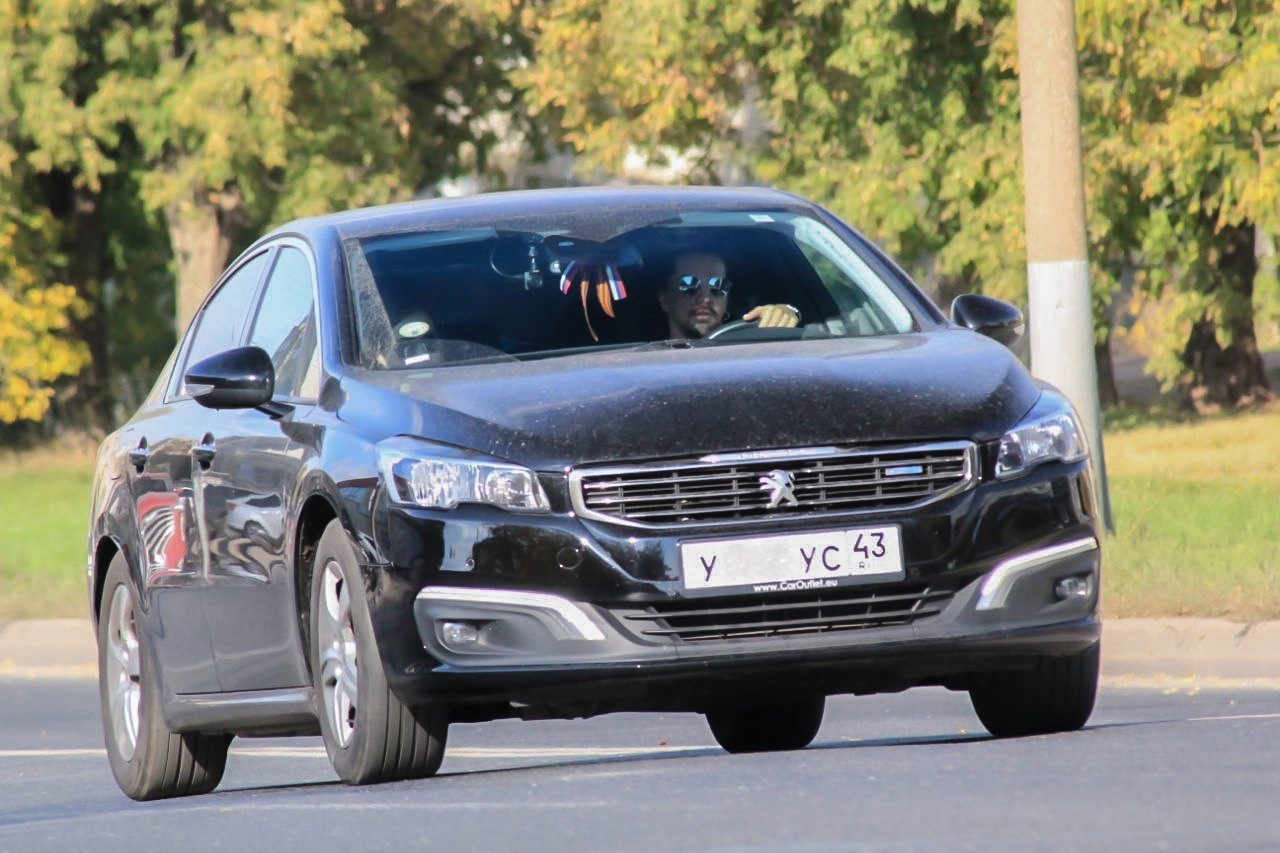
Peugeot 508 I

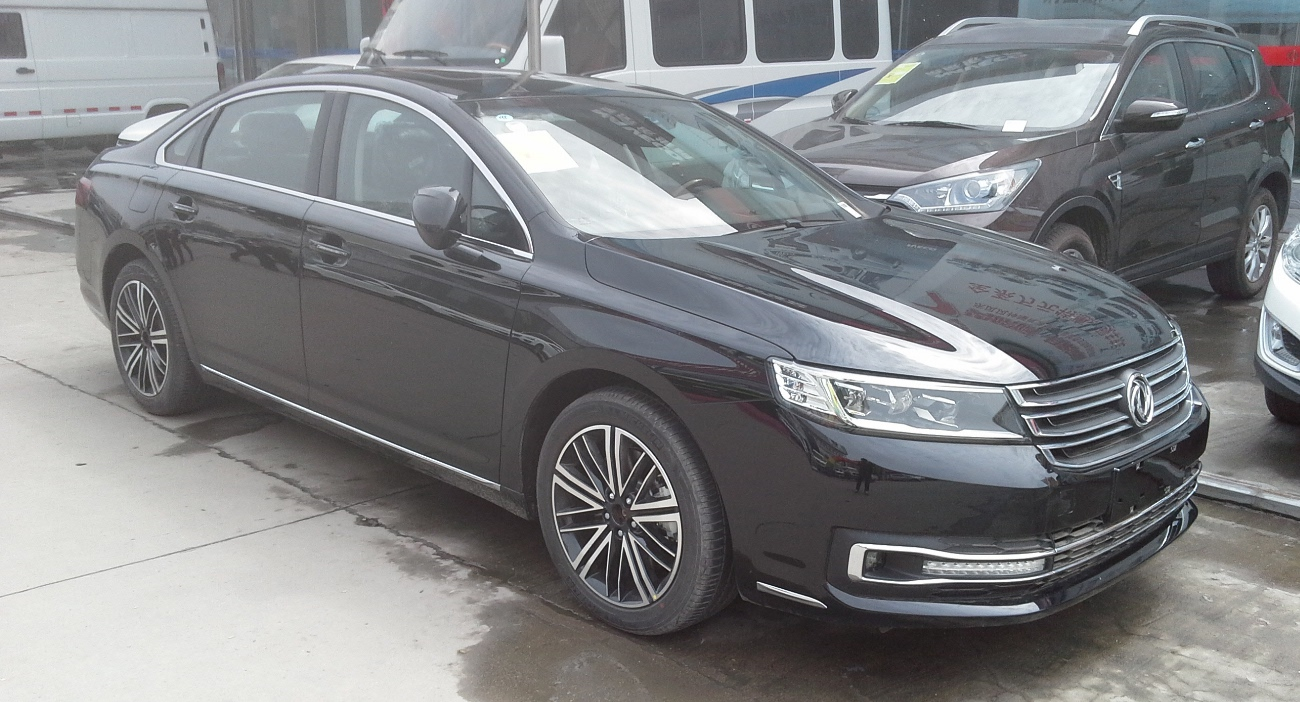
Dongfeng A9

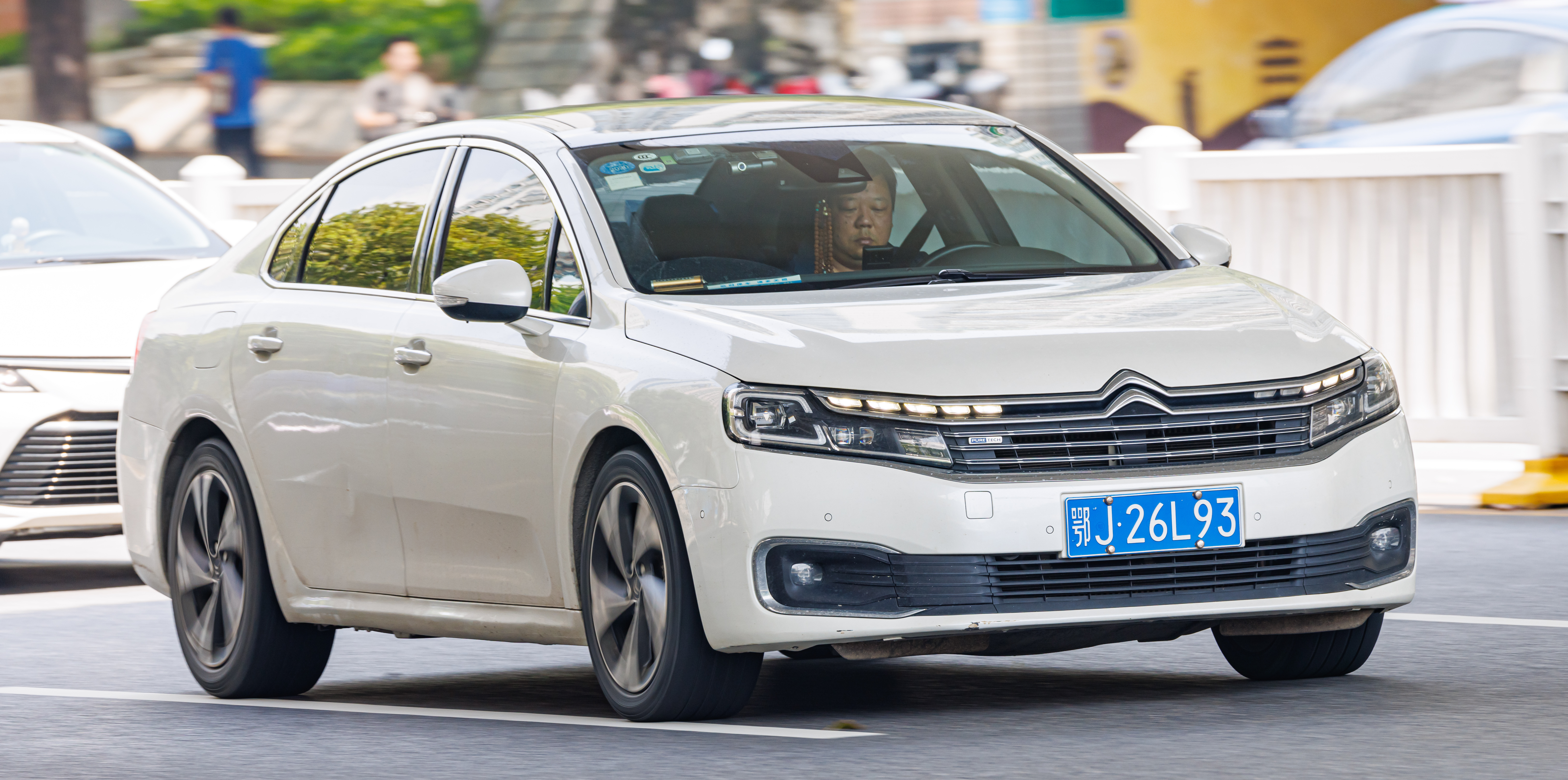
Citroën C6 II
