= Citroën Metropolis =

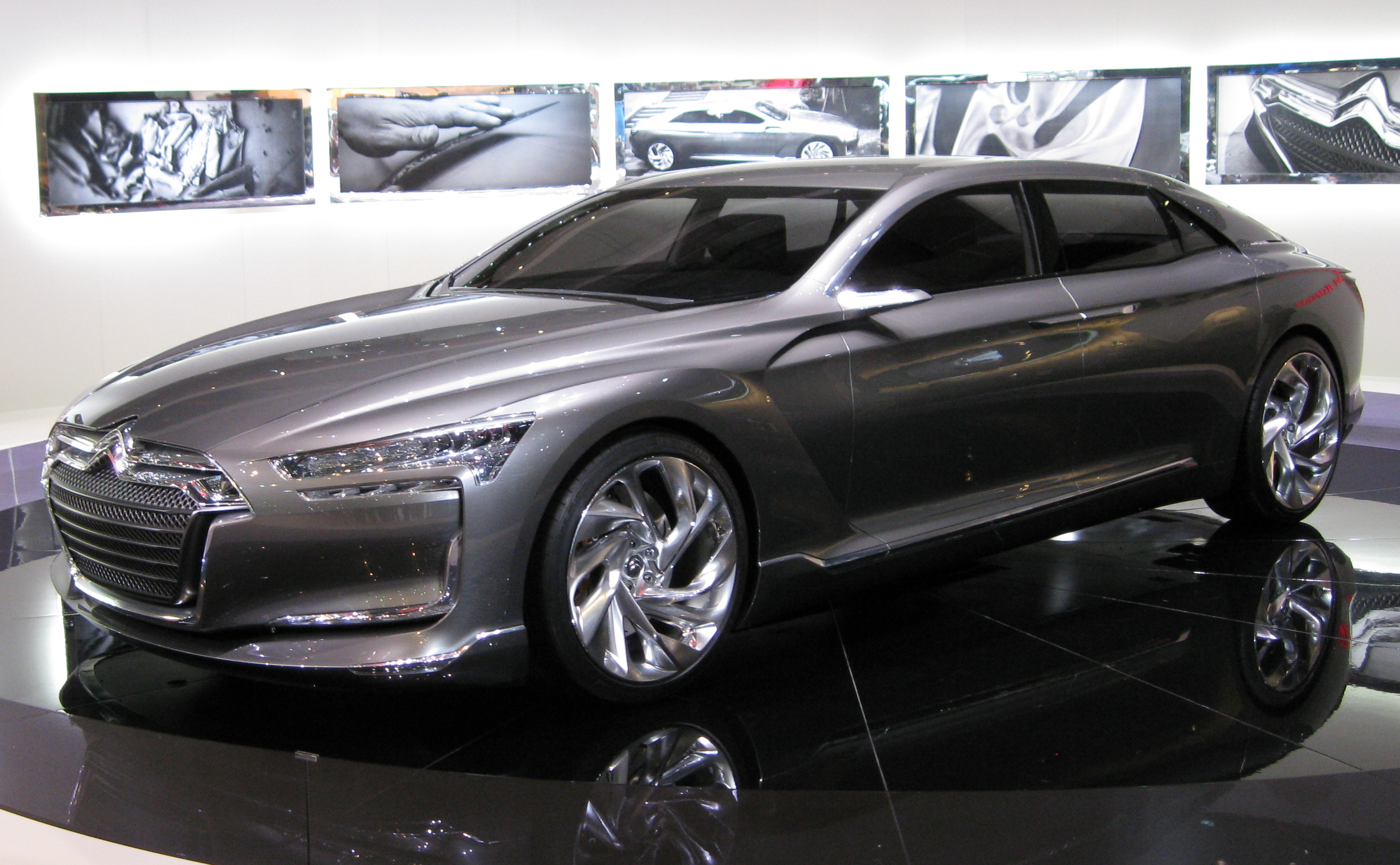

Overview
- Manufacturer: Citroën
- Production: 2010 (concept car)

Body and chassis
- Class: Executive car (E)
- Body style: 4-door saloon
- Layout: Front-engine, four-wheel-drive
- Related: Peugeot 607; Citroën C6

Powertrain
- Engine: 2.0 L direct injection V6 electric motor (hybrid)
- Transmission: 7-speed (dual-clutch electronic) semi-automatic

Chronology
- Predecessor: Citroën C6
- Successor: Citroën CXperience (2016; concept car); DS 9 (2021)

The Citroën Metropolis is a concept car, designed in China by Citroën and presented on the French pavilion of the Expo 2010 in Shanghai. The concept was unveiled in May 2010, though the first pictures were revealed a month earlier.

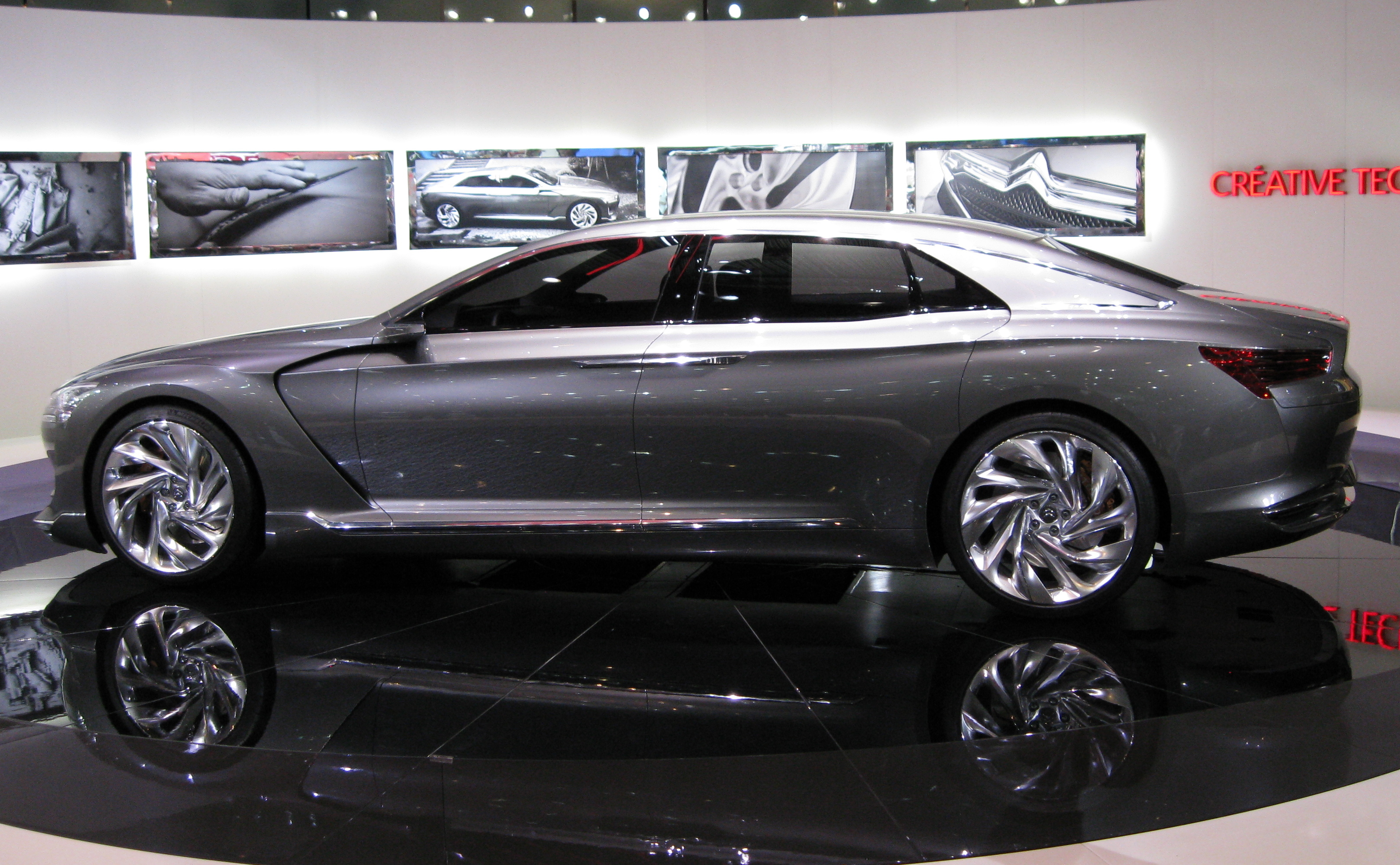
Side view

The Citroën Metropolis is a long, four-door saloon featuring four seats, rear-hinged doors, an LCD navigator, long and low headlights, silver door handles and revised grille with Citroën's new logo. The vehicle was confirmed for production in October 2010, but was a further ten years before the DS 9 was revealed, for launch in 2021.
