= NaviDrive =

The NaviDrive system is a voice-activated radio, CD player, telephone, and GPS automotive head unit, assembled in some models of the Citroën C8, Citroën C6, Citroën C5, Citroën C4, Citroën C3, and Peugeot vehicles.

== Functions ==
NaviDrive's main functions and characteristics are:

- 7-inch (18 cm) monochrome or color screen
- Complete GPS navigation system
- Radio, CD player with MP3 format and CD changer for 6 CDs
- Integrated GSM dual band handsfree telephone
- Text-to-speech during the reading of SMS messages
- Voice recognition
- Real-time traffic information (RDS-TMC)

== Incident response ==
In certain countries such as France, Germany, Spain, Italy, Belgium, Netherlands and Luxembourg, in the case of an accident, NaviDrive sends a text message containing the exact GPS position of the vehicle by pressing a button or when an airbag deploys, followed by a voice call to a special telephonic assistance platform which receives the position and the voice call. The platform determines the kind of urgency (e.g. medical, accident, fire), by asking a few questions and sends the appropriate emergency services to the exact location of the vehicle.

== See also ==
- OnStar
