= Renault Argos =

Overview
- Manufacturer: Renault
- Production: 1994
- Designer: Jean-Pierre Ploué; Patrick Le Quément

Body and chassis
- Body style: Sport coupe

Powertrain
- Engine: 1.2 litre

Dimensions
- Curb weight: 750 kg (1,650 lb)

The Renault Argos was an open-top two-seater concept car created by Renault and was first shown at the 1994 Paris Motor Show. It was designed by Jean-Pierre Ploué under the direction of Patrick Le Quément and was displayed purely as a design study with no performance figures issued.

== Technical details ==
The Argos was powered by a Renault Twingo 1.2 L (1,239cc) 4-cylinder engine mated to an electronically controlled automatic transmission. The Argos had a weight of only 750 kg (1,653 lb), which is very light for an automobile.

The structure and design of the car was quite innovative with such features as doors that opened by sliding aft to nestle in the rear fenders, no superstructure, roof or even windscreen to interrupt the lines and wing mirrors retract into front wings, and only deploy when engine is started.
