= Lancia Gamma (2026) =

Compact luxury crossover SUV

- Lancia Gamma EV at the 2026 Turin Auto Show

Overview
- Manufacturer: Lancia (Stellantis)
- Model code: Type L74
- Production: 2026 (to commence)
- Assembly: Italy: Melfi

Body and chassis
- Class: Compact luxury crossover SUV (D)
- Body style: 5-door coupe SUV
- Layout: Front-engine, front-wheel-drive (mild hybrid); Front-motor, front-wheel-drive (EV); Dual-motor, all-wheel-drive (EV)
- Platform: STLA Medium
- Related: DS No. 7 DS No. 8

Powertrain
- Engine: Petrol: 1.2 L EB2LTEDH2 I3 turbo (mild hybrid)
- Electric motor: 1x permanently excited synchronous motor (PMSM) with 230 hp (standard range EV) or 245 hp (long range EV); 2x permanently excited synchronous motors (PMSM) combined 375 hp (dual-motor)
- Transmission: 8-speed automatic (mild hybrid)
- Hybrid drivetrain: Mild hybrid
- Battery: 0.43 kWh 48V (mild hybrid); 73.7 kWh 400V liquid-cooled lithium-nickel-manganese-cobalt (li-ion NMC) (EV standard range); 97.2 kWh 400V liquid-cooled lithium-nickel-manganese-cpbalt (Li-ion NMC) (EV long range / AWD models)
- Electric range: 540 km WLTP (standard range); 740 km WLTP (long range); ~675 km WLTP (dual-motor)

Dimensions
- Wheelbase: 2,790 mm (109.8 in)
- Length: 4,660 mm (183.5 in)
- Width: 1,900 mm (74.8 in)
- Height: 1,630 mm (64.2 in)
- Curb weight: 1,558 kg (3,430 lb)

The Lancia Gamma (Type L74) is a compact luxury crossover SUV to be produced by Lancia.

The model will be presented on the occasion of the brand's 120th anniversary celebrations. In 2026, in addition to the 120th anniversary of the Lancia brand, the 50th anniversary of the 1976 Gamma model is also being celebrated.

== Overview ==
Rear view

The Lancia Gamma was unveiled on 26 May 2026, and is scheduled to go on sale in November the same year. The Lancia Gamma is built together with the DS No. 7 and DS No. 8 in Melfi, Italy.

== Specifications ==
The Lancia Gamma is based on the STLA Medium platform of Stellantis supporting BEV, PHEV, and mild hybrid powertrains.

=== HF Integrale ===
On 6 July 2026, the Lancia Gamma HF Integrale was unveiled ahead of its official presentation at the 2026 Paris Motor Show. On 11 September 2026, the Lancia Gamma HF Integrale was unveiled at the 2026 Turin Auto Show during the celebrations marking Lancia's 120th anniversary.
