= GT by Citroën =

Concept car manufactured by Citroën in partnership with Polyphony Digital

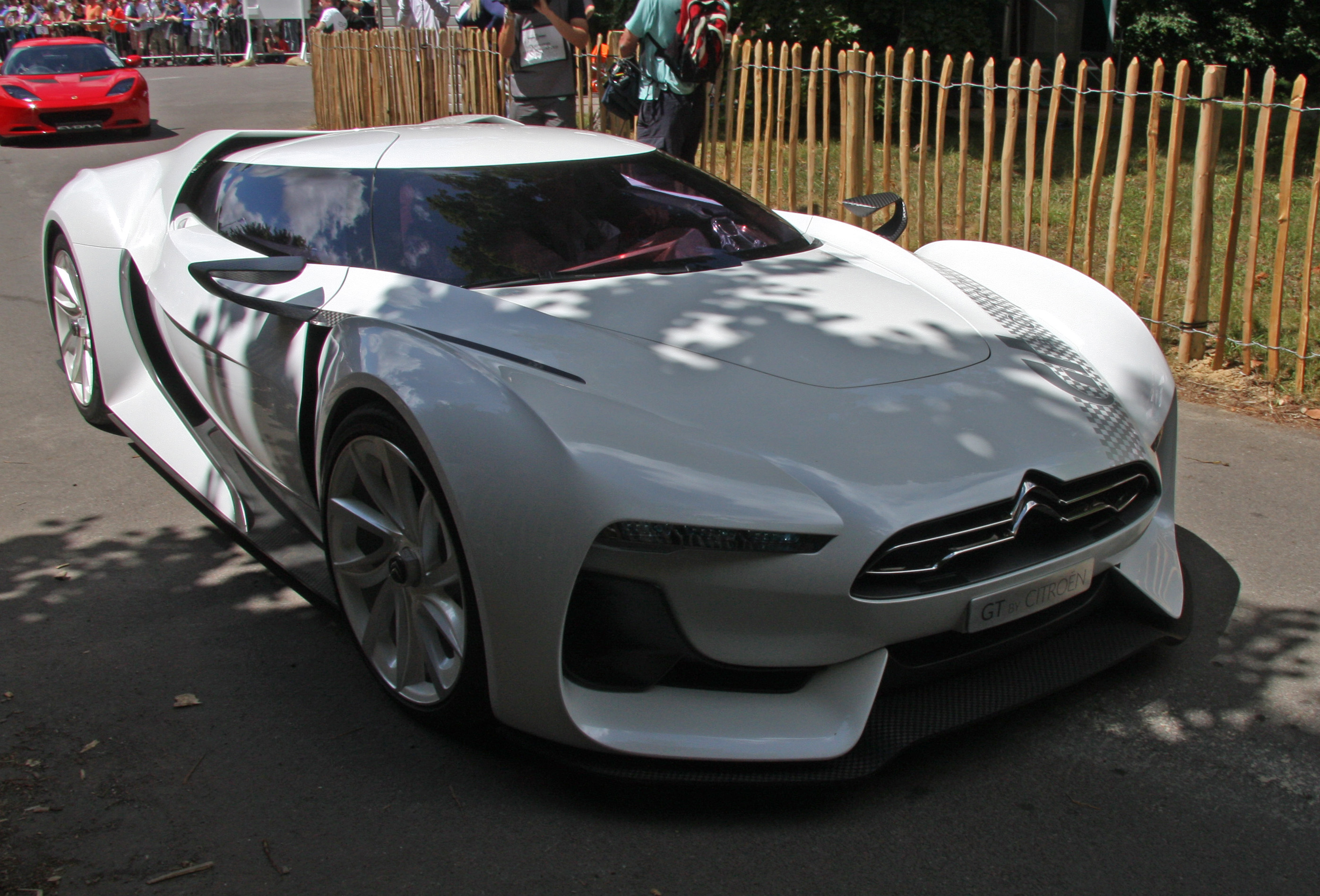

Overview
- Manufacturer: Citroën
- Designer: Takumi Yamamoto

Body and chassis
- Class: Sports car prototype
- Body style: Two seater, mid-engined coupé
- Layout: Four-wheel drive
- Doors: Butterfly

Powertrain
- Engine: In the game: 778 bhp (580 kW) x4 hydrogen fuel cell; In real life: 646 hp (482 kW) 5.4L Ford V8
- Transmission: 7-speed "circle" sequential gearbox

Dimensions
- Wheelbase: 2,810 mm (110.6 in)
- Length: 4,960 mm (195.3 in)
- Width: 2,080 mm (81.9 in)
- Height: 1,090 mm (42.9 in)
- Curb weight: 1,400 kg (3,086 lb)

GT by Citroën at Goodwood Festival of Speed 2010

The GT by Citroën (sometimes spelled GTbyCitroën) is a sports car that debuted as a concept car on October 2 at the 2008 Paris Motor Show. The car is a collaboration between the French automaker Citroën and the Japanese racing simulation developer Polyphony Digital. Six cars were expected to be built, with an expected MSRP of $2,100,000; however, the production run was allegedly cancelled in 2010 due to high costs.

== Design ==
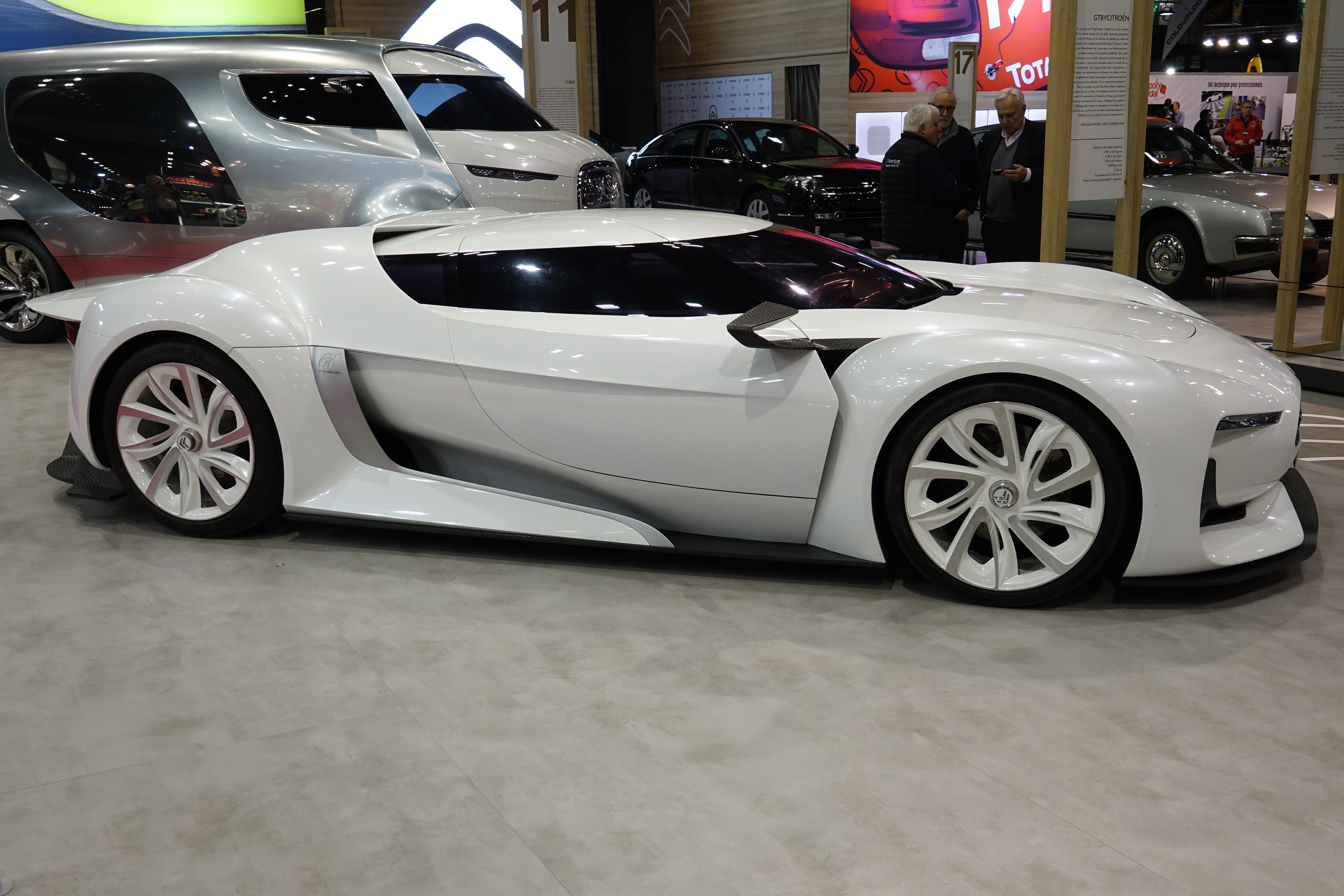
Side view

=== Joint venture ===
The GT by Citroën concept car was created, designed and produced for the video game Gran Turismo 5 and was included through download in its initial version Gran Turismo 5 Prologue. Its designer came up with the project and sold it to both Polyphony Digital and Citroën. Polyphony Digital had previously collaborated with a number of Japanese performance parts manufacturers and tuners, mainly related to Nissan, since January 2002. Most of these cars had their virtual counterpart featured in the Gran Turismo games as "Concept by Gran Turismo".

=== Citroën ===
The car's exterior design was made by Takumi Yamamoto, a Japanese designer from Jean-Pierre Ploué's Style Citroën design team. Takumi Yamamoto was a childhood friend of Kazunori Yamauchi, director of Polyphony Digital and creator of the popular Gran Turismo franchise, also known as "Gegge". According to a Yamauchi interview at the Paris Motor Show 2008, he and Yamamoto started collaborating on this project back in 2003. A press release published on the North American Gran Turismo official website describes the Citroën and Polyphony Digital collaboration as "a joint effort first talked about at the Geneva Motor Show past March" [2008]. Yamamoto convinced Jean-Pierre Ploué to submit his concept to Citroën's head office in Paris who agreed to start the production process and manufacture the real car. The concept car's rear was carefully designed to fit what the gamers will actually see in the game since it is the more powerful featured vehicle, argues Yamamoto.

== Specifications ==
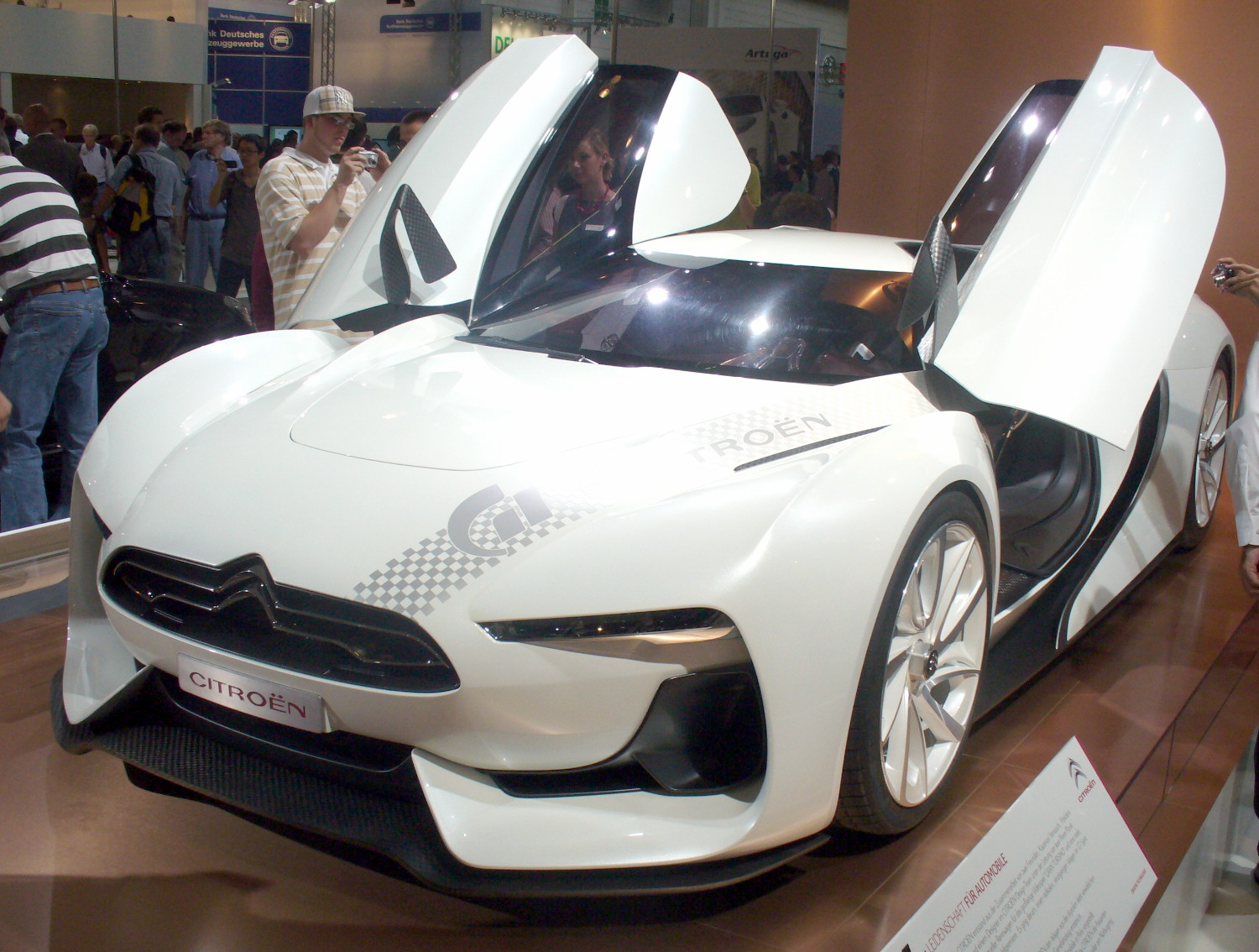
GT with the butterfly doors up

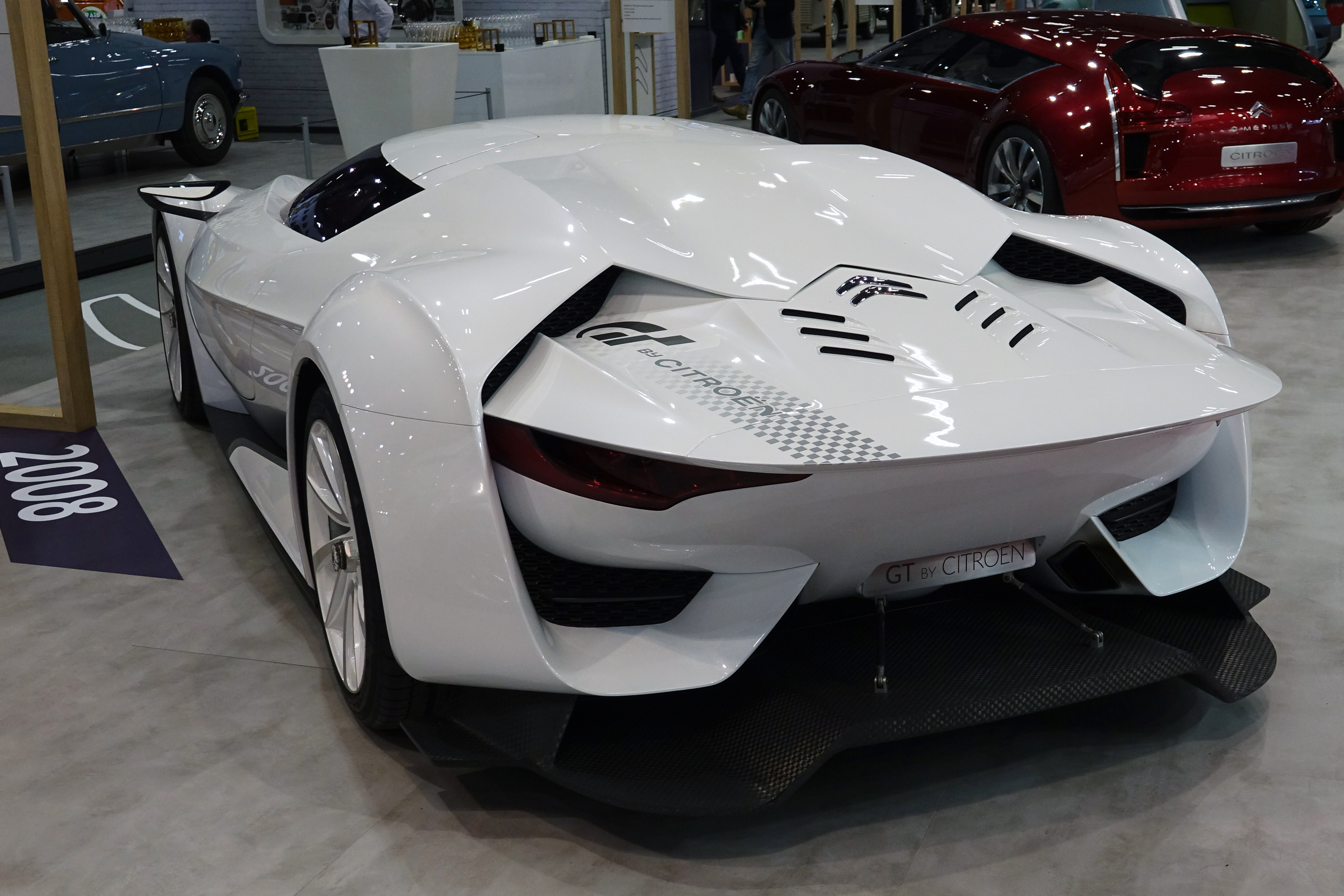
Rear view

=== In game ===
Since Gran Turismo 5 Prologue, there have been three versions of the GT by Citroën. All specifications of each version are from Polyphony Digital's Gran Turismo franchise, Gran Turismo Sport.

- Road version - 500 hp (373 kW; 507 PS), 384 lb⋅ft (521 N⋅m)
- Gr.4 version - 394 hp (294 kW; 399 PS), 283 lb⋅ft (384 N⋅m)
- Race/Gr.3 version - 599 hp (447 kW; 607 PS), 431 lb⋅ft (584 N⋅m)
- Concept version - 778 hp (580 kW; 789 PS), 1,840 lb⋅ft (2,495 N⋅m)

The concept version in the game features a battery powering four electric motors delivering 778 hp (580 kW; 789 PS). In Gran Turismo Sport, only the road and race version (christened as a "Gr.3" class race car, equivalent to Group GT3 class race car) is featured, in addition to a lightly modified "Gr.4" racing version (equivalent to GT4 class race car).

=== In real life ===
The real car uses a modified version of the Ford Modular V8 petrol/gasoline engine, producing 646 hp (482 kW; 655 PS) The car's weight is 1,400 kg (3,086 lb).

== Production ==
In June 2009, Citroën confirmed plans to produce an extremely limited number of GTs for sale to the public. Only 6 were planned to be built, each costing $2.1 million. In July 2010, rumours that production was suspended began to surface, citing excessive engineering and development costs relative to the size of the production run as the reason.

== Appearances ==
The car made its debut appearance in the Gran Turismo series, and has continued on ever since, and it also had a non-Sony appearance in the discontinued Facebook game Car Town. Its Car Town appearance marked its only non-GT appearance until its announcement in Asphalt 8: Airborne on September 30, 2016. It was added in the 2016 Autumn Update for the game released on October 13, 2016. It also was added in Asphalt Legends, specifically, the Full Throttle Update, released on December 10, 2020, for iOS and Android, and on December 15 of the same year for Windows.

The GT was added to The Crew 2 as part of the free "Blazing Shots" update in November 2019, however the Gran Turismo logo has been removed from its livery and only the checkerboard pattern remains. The car also appeared in The Crew Motorfest that released in 2023.
