= DS No. 7 =

Compact luxury crossover SUV

Overview
- Manufacturer: DS Automobiles
- Production: 2026 (to commence)
- Assembly: Italy: Melfi

Body and chassis
- Class: Compact luxury crossover SUV
- Body style: 5-door SUV
- Layout: Front-engine, front-wheel-drive; Front-motor, front-wheel drive; Dual-motor, all-wheel drive
- Platform: STLA Medium
- Related: Lancia Gamma; DS No. 8 Peugeot 3008 III; Peugeot 5008 III

Powertrain
- Engine: Petrol mild hybrid: 1.2 L turbo I3
- Electric motor: 21 kW (MHEV); PMSM (EV)
- Transmission: 6-speed e-DSC6 DCT
- Battery: 73.7 kWh NMC ACC; 97.2 kWh NMC ACC
- Electric range: 504–740 km (313–460 mi) (WLTP)
- Plug-in charging: DC: 160 kW (97.2 kWh)

Dimensions
- Wheelbase: 2,790 mm (109.8 in)
- Length: 4,660 mm (183.5 in)
- Width: 1,900 mm (74.8 in)
- Height: 1,630 mm (64.2 in)
- Curb weight: 1,556–2,252 kg (3,430–4,960 lb)

Chronology
- Predecessor: DS 7

The DS No. 7 (styled DS N°7) is a compact luxury crossover SUV to be produced by the French automaker DS Automobiles.

== Overview ==
Rear

Interior

The No. 7 was unveiled in March 2026 as the successor to the DS 7. It was scheduled to go on sale in October 2026. The No. 7 is built alongside the larger DS No. 8 in Melfi, Italy.

== Specifications ==
The No. 7 is based on the STLA Medium platform of Stellantis. Sister models include the Jeep Compass, the Opel Grandland, and the Peugeot 3008. At 4.66 meters long, the No. 7 is slightly larger than its predecessor, while its width and height are similar. The wheelbase is 2.79 meters, and the drag coefficient is 0.26 C_{d} (C_{x}) and 0.69 C_{d}·A (SC_{x}). The trunk capacity is 560 litres (19.8 cu ft) with the rear seats unfolded.

In addition to the all-electric E-Tense versions familiar from the DS No. 8, with up to 276 kW (375 hp), This engine is a mild hybrid. A plug-in hybrid, and a diesel engine are no longer available. All electric versions reach a top speed of 190 km/h, while the mild hybrid has a top speed of 201 km/h.

The No. 7 is available with either petrol mild-hybrid or battery electric powertrains.

The petrol mild-hybrid uses a 1.2-liter turbocharged inline-3 paired to an 6-speed dual-clutch transmission with an integrated 21 kW (28 hp; 29 PS) motor for a total system output of 143 hp (107 kW; 145 PS) at 5,500 rpm and 230 N⋅m (170 lb⋅ft) of torque at 1,750 rpm. It is capable of a 0–100 km/h (62 mph) acceleration time of 10.4 seconds and a top speed of 200 km/h (124 mph).

The No. 7 is available in three battery electric powertrain variants. The base variant uses a 73.7 kWh NMC battery pack delivering 504–543 km (313–337 mi) of WLTP range and is capable of recharging from 20–80% in 31 minutes. It is equipped with a 227 hp (169 kW; 230 PS) front motor with a 256 hp (191 kW; 260 PS) boost mode for a 0–100 km/h (62 mph) acceleration time of 7.7 seconds.

The FWD Long Range variants use a 97.2 kWh NMC battery pack delivering 740 km (460 mi) of WLTP range and up to 540 km (336 mi) at a constant speed of 120 km/h (75 mph) according to DS. DS says it can maintain its 160 kW peak charge rate between 20–55%, allowing it to recharge from 20–80% in 27 minutes or 190 km (118 mi) in 10 minutes. It is equipped with a 242 hp (180 kW; 245 PS) front motor with a 276 hp (206 kW; 280 PS) boost mode for a 0–100 km/h (62 mph) acceleration time of 7.8 seconds. AWD Long Range variants use the same battery pack and achieve a 679 km (422 mi) WLTP range rating, and adds a second permanent magnet synchronous motor to the rear axle to achieve a dual-motor all-wheel drive layout which outputs 345 hp (257 kW; 350 PS) and 370 hp (276 kW; 375 PS) in boost mode, for a 0–100 km/h (62 mph) acceleration time of 5.4 seconds.

Specifications
| Model | Battery | Power | | Torque | Range | 0–100 km/h (62 mph) time | Top speed | Kerb weight |
| Model | Battery | Sustained | Boost | Torque | WLTP | 0–100 km/h (62 mph) time | Top speed | Kerb weight |
|---|---|---|---|---|---|---|---|---|
| e-DSC Hybrid | 48-volt Li-ion | 143 hp (107 kW; 145 PS) | — | 230 N⋅m (170 lb⋅ft) | 756 km (470 mi) | 10.4 s | 198 km/h (123 mph) | 1,556 kg (3,430 lb) |
| E-TENSE FWD | 73.7 kWh NMC | 227 hp (169 kW; 230 PS) | 256 hp (191 kW; 260 PS) | 343 N⋅m (253 lb⋅ft) | 543 km (337 mi) | 7.7 s | 190 km/h (118 mph) | 2,091 kg (4,610 lb) |
| E-TENSE FWD Long Range | 97.2 kWh NMC | 242 hp (180 kW; 245 PS) | 276 hp (206 kW; 280 PS) | 343 N⋅m (253 lb⋅ft) | 740 km (460 mi) | 7.8 s | 190 km/h (118 mph) | 2,138 kg (4,713 lb) |
| E-TENSE AWD Long Range | 97.2 kWh NMC | 345 hp (257 kW; 350 PS) | 370 hp (276 kW; 375 PS) | 509 N⋅m (375 lb⋅ft) | 679 km (422 mi) | 5.4 s | 190 km/h (118 mph) | 2,252 kg (4,965 lb) |

== Safety ==
Euro NCAP test results DS N°8 Long Range, FWD, 'Pallas', LHD (2025)
| Test | Points | % |
|---|---|---|
| Overall: | 4 /5 stars | |
| Adult occupant: | 30.5 | 76% |
| Child occupant: | 42 | 85% |
| Pedestrian: | 50.7 | 80% |
| Safety assist: | 11.9 | 65% |
