= DS No. 8 =

Battery electric luxury crossover SUV

DS N°8
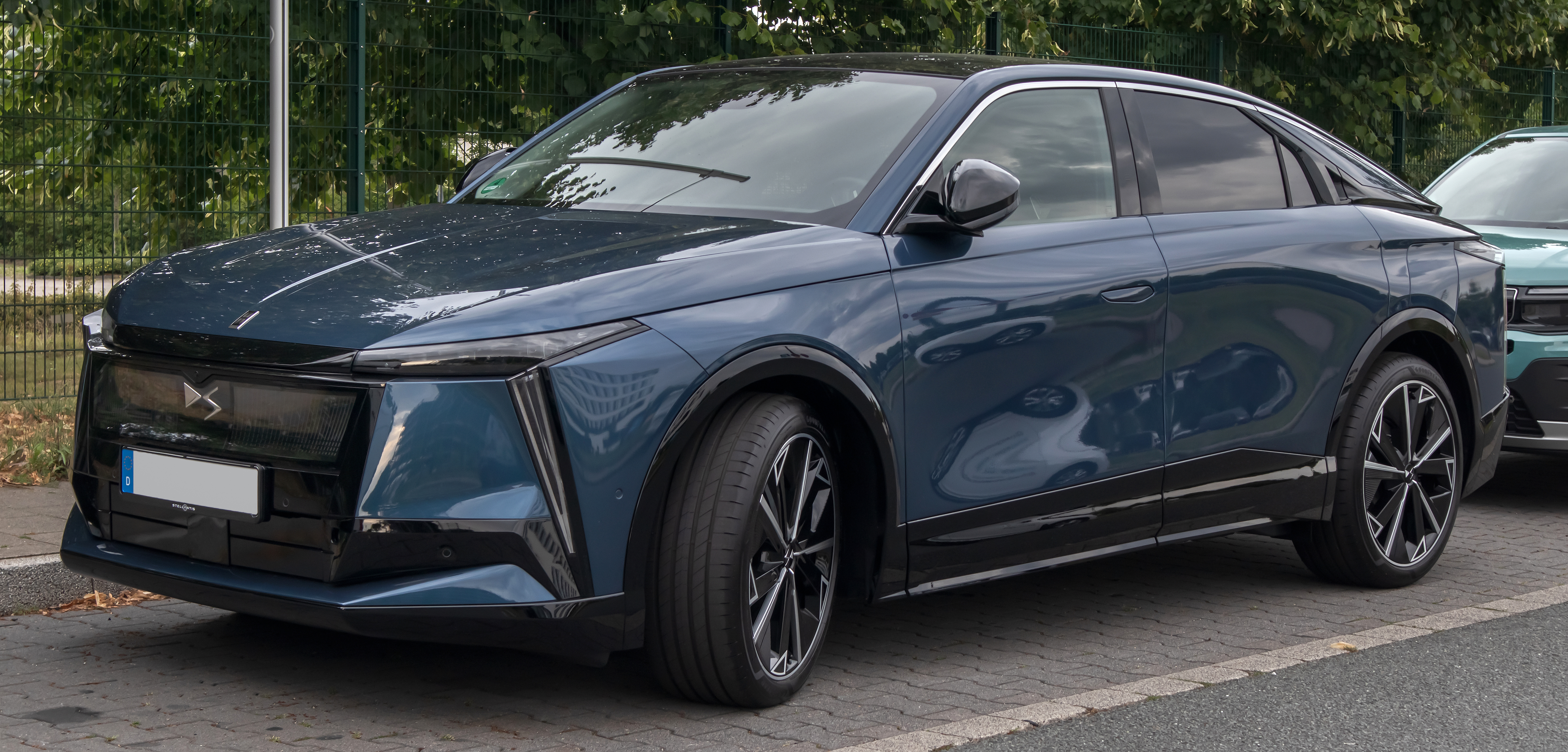

Overview
- Manufacturer: DS Automobiles
- Model code: D85
- Production: April 2025 – present
- Assembly: Italy: Melfi
- Designer: Thomas Duhamel

Body and chassis
- Class: Compact luxury crossover SUV (D)
- Body style: 5-door coupe SUV
- Layout: Front-motor, front-wheel-drive / all-wheel drive
- Platform: STLA Medium 'EVO'
- Related: DS No. 7 Lancia Gamma

Powertrain
- Battery: 74 kWh / 97.2 kWh (Automotive Cells Company)
- Range: 572 km (355 mi) / 750 km (470 mi)

Dimensions
- Wheelbase: 2,900 mm (114.2 in)
- Length: 4,820 mm (189.8 in)
- Width: 1,900 mm (74.8 in)
- Height: 1,580 mm (62.2 in)
- Kerb weight: 2,132–2,289 kg (4,700–5,046 lb)

Chronology
- Predecessor: DS 9

The DS No. 8 (styled DS N°8) is a battery electric crossover SUV with a sloping roofline by DS Automobiles unveiled on 12 December 2024, and production commenced in Melfi, Italy in April 2025.

N°8 pronounced 'number eight' (or 'numéro huit' in French), is the first model to feature the brand's new model naming strategy. According to DS Automobiles, the number 8 "is associated with balance and serenity, which combine to form a harmonious whole". It features the No8 badge on the rear fascia, next to the 'DS Automobiles' emblem, in a new 'separated branding' arrangement which the brand says, will ensure "a clear division between the brand and the model".

== Overview ==
The front fascia features DS Lightblade lighting and the Luminascreen grille with an illuminated DS badge. The design of the rear fascia with its body lines and lighting echoes the front fascia, it features a sloped roofline and vertical LED taillights. DS claimed that the extensive work on the body shape, including the flushed door handles and low roofline, resulted in increased aerodynamics worth an additional 60 km (37 mi) of electric range.

The interior of the N°8 features eight colour ambient lighting, an X-shaped steering wheel which is placed behind the backlit dashboard design which consists of the 10.25-inch digital instrument cluster and 16-inch touchscreen infotainment system (powered by the DS Iris System 2.0 operating system), the integration of exterior blade light bars on the door panels, and the seats finished in a watchstrap leather design. There is two tier centre console, with the floating upper tier comprising the drive mode controls and a wireless charging pad, while the lower tier features a padded knee support and storage areas. The suspended dashboard combines brushed aluminium, Nappa leather, and recycled Alcantara materials. Upcycled fabrics and plastics were used for the seats and interior panels. DS has avoided using chrome parts in favour of a painted effect due to the impact of the chrome plating process on the environment.

All models comes standard with regenerative braking includes three intensity levels, controlled by the paddle shifters behind the steering wheel, and a one-pedal driving mode was also available. Additionally, the DS Active Scan Suspension uses cameras to monitor the condition of the road and adjusts the suspension to smooth out any road imperfections.

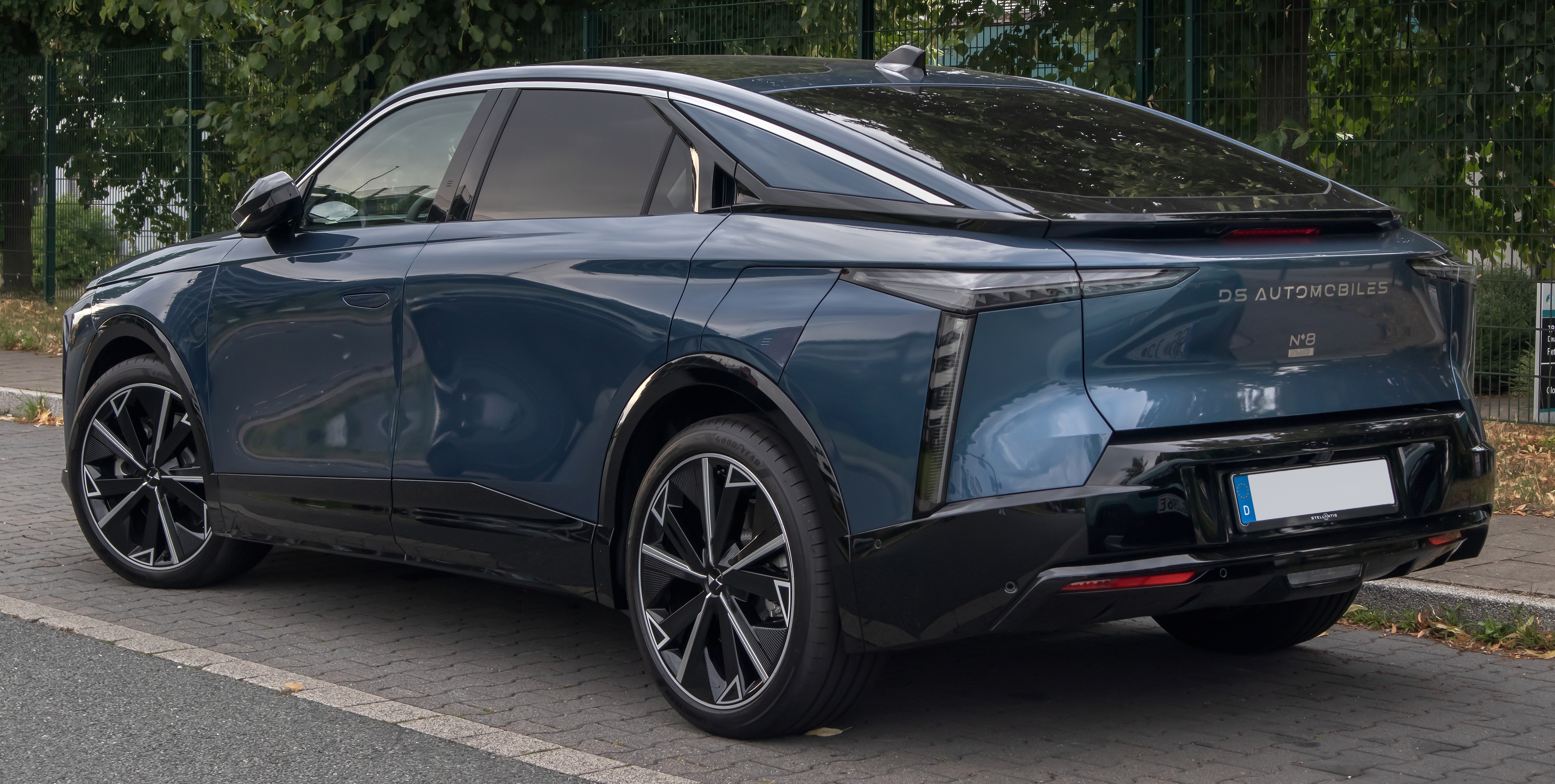
Rear view

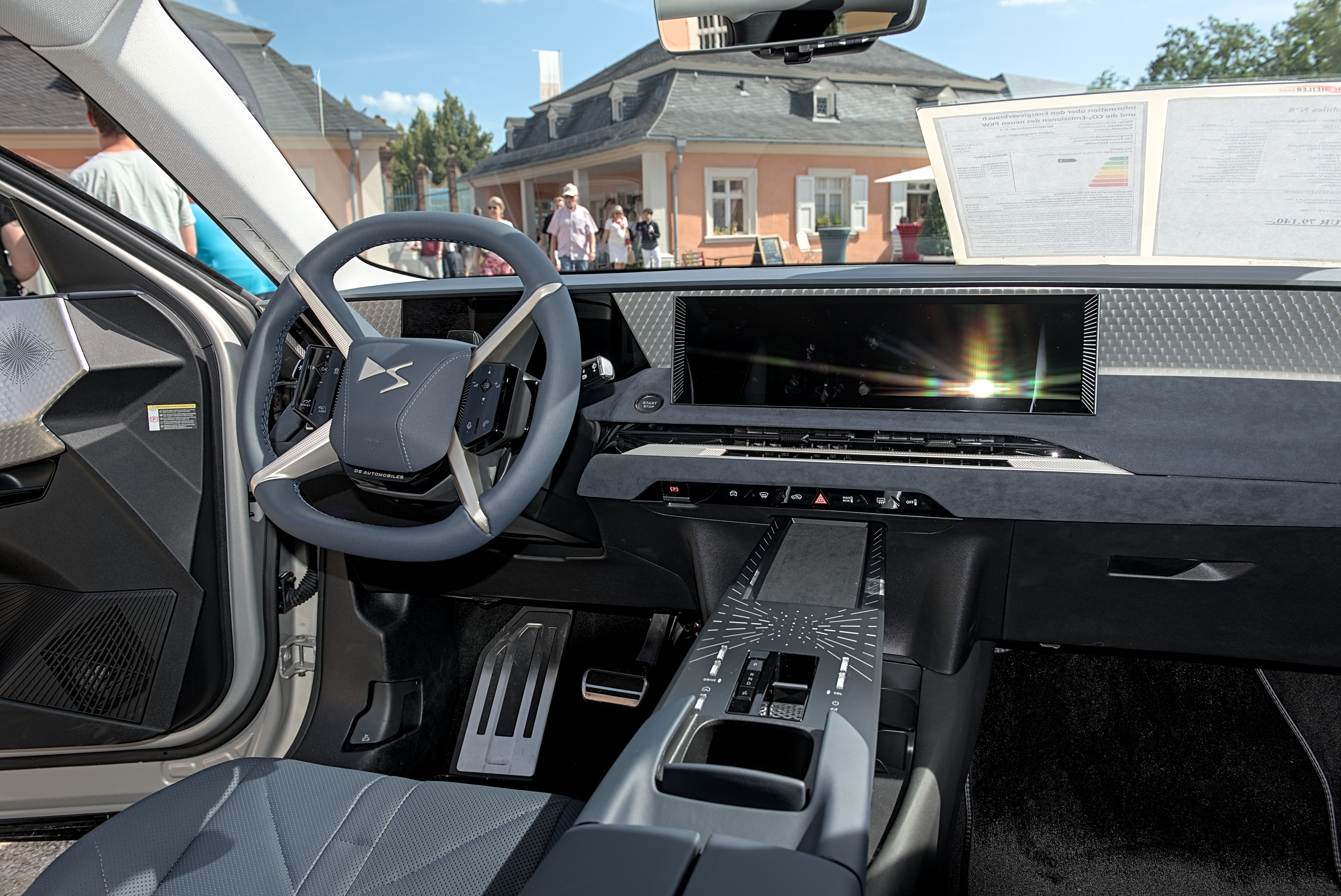
Interior

=== Safety ===
For safety, the N°8 features the DS Drive Assist 2.0 which enables semi-autonomous driving between speeds of 47–140 km/h (29–87 mph), and also allows the car to perform "semi-automatic lane changing", with the system allows the car to switch lanes automatically when the driver uses the indicator. Other driver-assistance features includes active lane change assist, active lane keeping assist, adaptive cruise control, emergency braking system which can detect pedestrians and cyclists, and traffic sign recognition.

Euro NCAP test results DS N°8 Long Range, FWD, 'Pallas' (LHD) (2025)
Test	Points	%
Overall:	4 /5 stars	
Adult occupant:	30.5	76%
Child occupant:	42.0	85%
Pedestrian:	50.6	80%
Safety assist:	11.8	65%

== Presidential car ==
A modified, armoured, DS N°8 was used as the French presidential car during the 8 May armistice celebrations. It was the first time the French Head of State used an electric presidential car.

== Total production ==
Calendar Year	Production
2025	1,706
