= Dongfeng A9 =

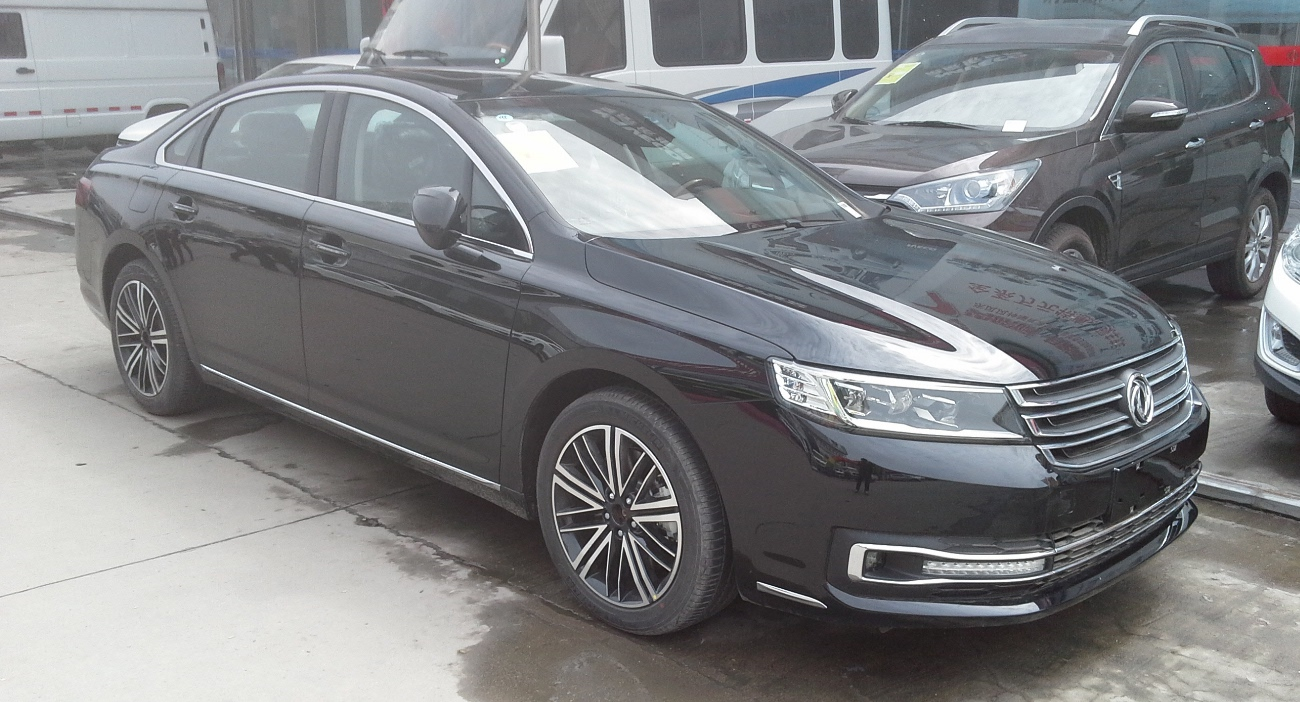

Overview
- Manufacturer: Dongfeng Motor Corporation
- Production: 2016–2019
- Assembly: Wuhan, China (Dongfeng Peugeot-Citroën)

Body and chassis
- Class: Executive car (E)
- Body style: 4-door saloon
- Layout: FF layout
- Platform: PSA EMP2 platform
- Related: Citroën C6; Peugeot 508

Powertrain
- Engine: 1.8 L EP8 turbo I4
- Transmission: 6-speed automatic

Dimensions
- Wheelbase: 2,900 mm (114 in)
- Length: 5,066 mm (199 in)
- Width: 1,858 mm (73 in)
- Height: 1,470 mm (58 in)
- Curb weight: 1,590–1,655 kg (3,505–3,649 lb)

The Dongfeng A9 is a full-size executive sedan produced by Dongfeng Motor Corporation under the Dongfeng Passenger Vehicle sub-brand. The Dongfeng A9 sedan was previewed by the Dongfeng Number 1 sedan concept during the 2014 Beijing Auto Show. The production was done during the timeline 2016-2019.The assembly was done in Wuhan, China(Dongfeng Peugeot-Citroen)

== History ==
The production version of the Dongfeng A9 debuted during the 2015 Shanghai Auto Show, and was originally planned to be available to the market from April 2016.

The A9 was postponed to be launched in July 2016 with prices ranging from 177,900 yuan to 219,700 yuan - making it by far the most expensive model, the Fengshen L60, started at just 89,700 yuan.

== Platform & Manufacturing ==
- Built on the PSA EMP2 platform
- The platform also underpins the China-only Citroën C6 and was planned for the DS9. All three are manufactured in the same factory by the Dongfeng-PSA joint venture.
- Dongfeng has access to this platform because they are one of PSA's largest shareholders.
- The A9 and Citroën C6 are essentially the same car in terms of body shape, engine, and dimensions — the C6 differentiates itself mainly through a more tech-focused interior with an all-digital instrument panel, and carries a higher price (starting around 200,000 yuan).

== Powertrain ==
The Dongfeng A9 is powered by a 1.8 liter THP(Turbo High Pressure - Internal branding name for their turbocharged petrol engines) turbocharged engine with 200 horsepower and 280 nm of torque, connected to a six-speed automatic gearbox.

== Design (Exterior & Interior) ==
EXTERIOR DESIGN

- Automotive journalists noted German design influences throughout, describing the styling as having "a little Volkswagen here, some Audi there" - yet without looking like a disjointed mix of borrowed styling cues.
- The front end is described as massive and very wide, dominated by multiple horizontal lines and a large grille featuring six chrome bars with the Dongfeng logo in the center.
- At the rear, the tail lights are connected by a chrome strip bearing the "Aeolus" name, and a thick chrome rim runs around the side windows.
- The rear lights were noted as quite large — a deliberate stylistic choice that went against the trend toward smaller lights prevalent in 2016.
- While two exhaust tips are visible integrated into the rear bumper, only one is functional — a detail that drew some criticism given the car's executive sedan positioning.
- The "Aeolus" name is printed on the rear chrome strip, but the "Fengshen" name itself does not appear on the car's exterior — only the A9 badge is present.

INTERIOR DESIGN

- The interior was described by journalists who visited dealerships as "top notch" with impressive build quality.
- Nappa leather seats throughout, with extensive real wood trim on the dashboard and other surfaces (the wood was noted as genuinely looking and feeling good, not cheap imitation).
- Conventional analogue instrument dials with a small screen between them — no digital cluster (unlike the Citroën C6).
- A touchscreen infotainment system is present, though the actual touch area is only 8 inches and reviewers noted it looked somewhat bolted-on rather than neatly integrated into the center stack.
- The audio system includes 12 speakers and a CD player.
- An analogue clock featuring the "Aeolus" name is mounted on the dashboard.
- The gear lever is a traditional large unit, with the start button placed to its left.
- The rear cabin has generous legroom, a center armrest with cup holders, and a combined aircon/stereo control panel. There is no full rear-seat entertainment system.

== Competition ==
Positioned to compete with the Hongqi H7, Roewe 950, and JAC Refine A60.

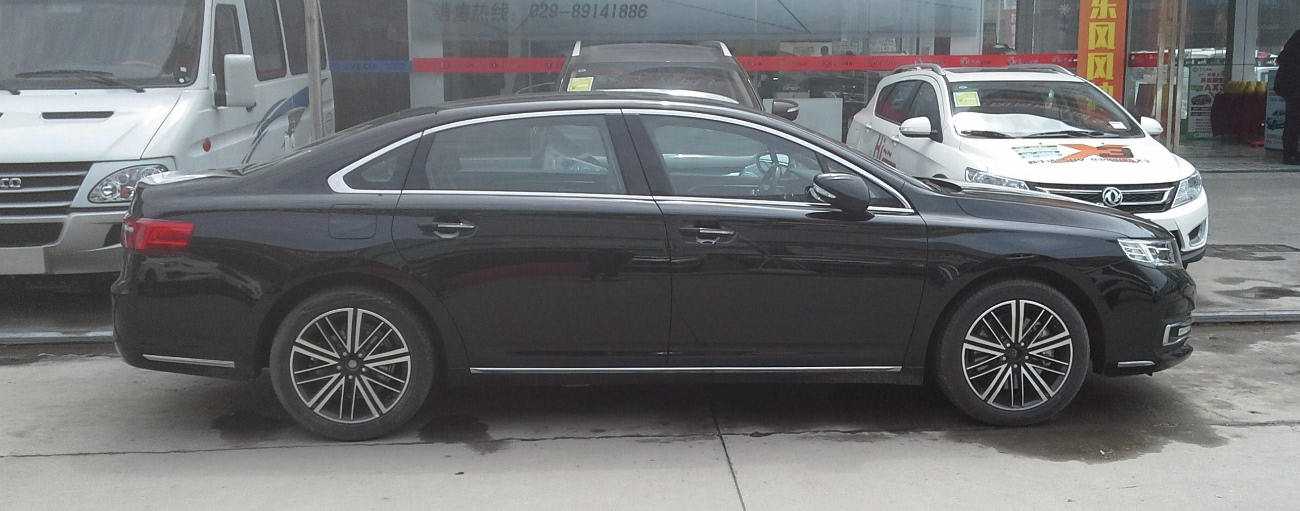
Dongfeng A9 side view

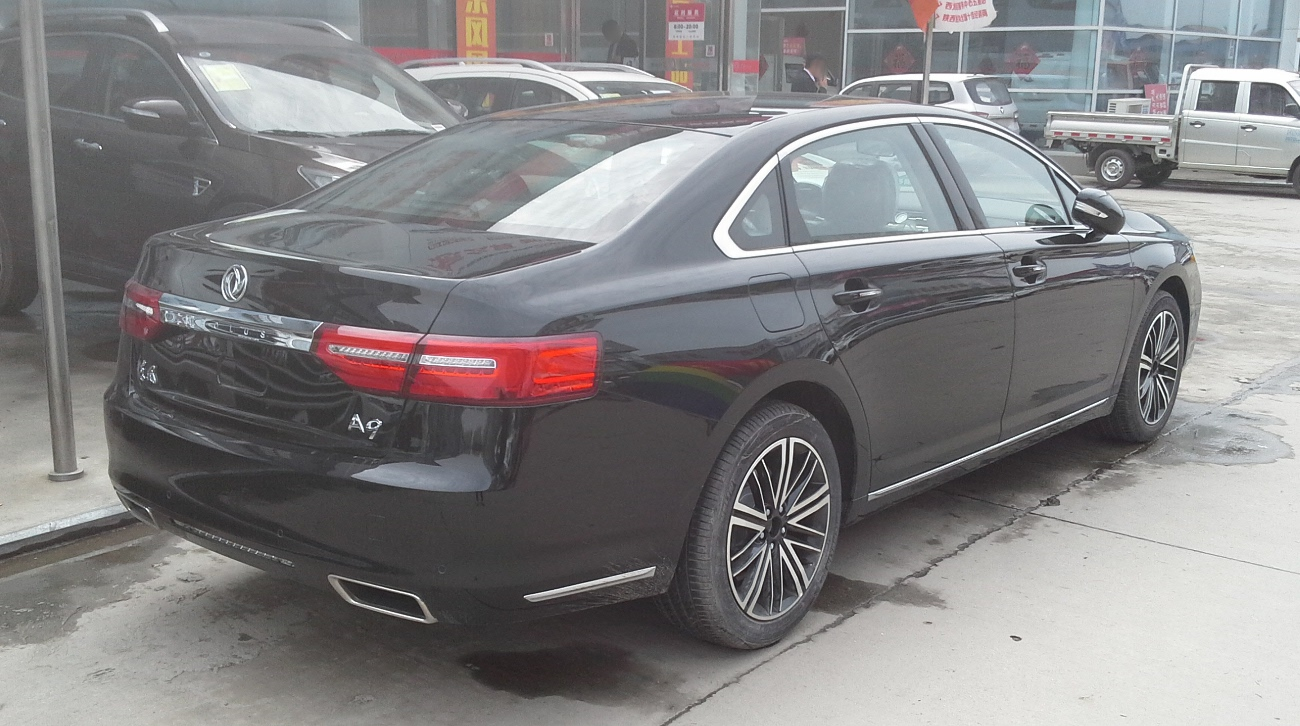
Dongfeng A9 rear view
