= Citroën C6 =

Executive saloon by Citroën

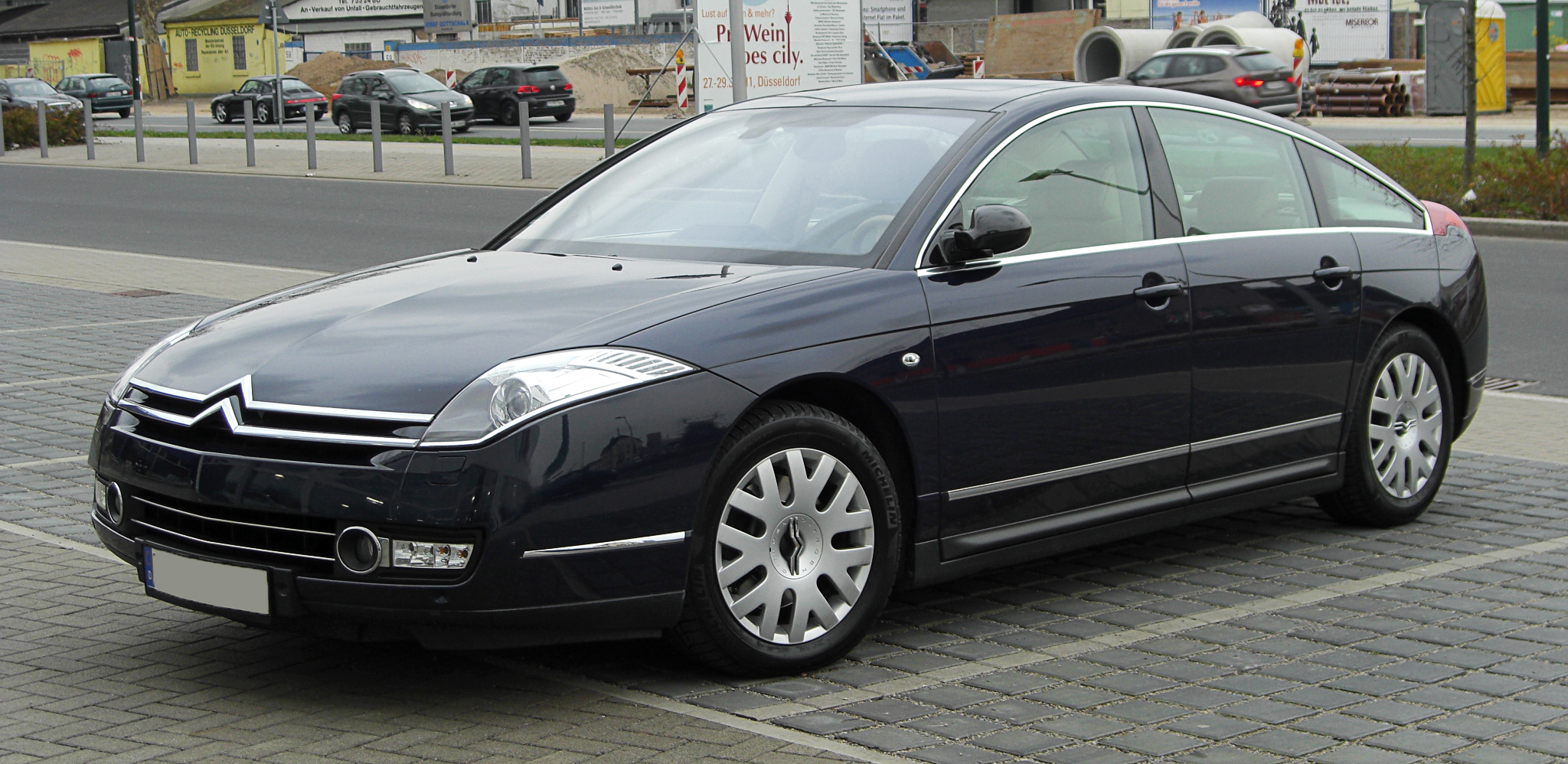

Overview
- Manufacturer: Citroën
- Production: 2005 – December 2012 (LHD); 2005 – May 2012 (RHD); 2016–2023 (China)
- Model years: 2006–2012
- Assembly: France: Rennes (PSA Rennes Plant)
- Designer: Marc Pinson

Body and chassis
- Class: Executive car/Mid-size Luxury car (E)
- Body style: 4-door fastback saloon
- Layout: FF layout
- Platform: PSA PF3

Powertrain
- Engine: Petrol: 3.0 L ES9 V6; Diesel: 2.2 L DW12 HDi Bi-turbo I4; 2.7 L DT17 HDi Bi-turbo V6; 3.0 L DT20 HDi Bi-turbo V6
- Transmission: 6-speed manual 6-speed Aisin AWTF-80 SC automatic

Dimensions
- Wheelbase: 114.2 in (2,901 mm)
- Length: 193.2 in (4,907 mm)
- Width: 73.2 in (1,859 mm)
- Height: 57.6 in (1,463 mm)
- Curb weight: 4,007–4,125 lb (1,818–1,871 kg)

Chronology
- Predecessor: Citroën XM
- Successor: Citroën C5 X DS 9 Citroën C6 II (China)

The Citroën C6 is an executive car (E) produced by the French car maker Citroën from 2005 to 2012. Production started up again in China in 2016, before ending in 2023. The Citroën C6 was inspired by the Citroën C6 Lignage concept car with fastback-saloon like styling.

The C6 was inspired by the Citroën C6 Lignage prototype, which was first shown at the Geneva Motor Show in the spring of 1999, but can be differentiated due to a few minor details (such as the lack of suicide doors, which were present in the concept model). The C6 was intended to serve as a replacement for the late Citroën XM, and the company was intent on launching it before the end of the year 2000.

== History ==
At the time, it was hoped that the C6 would go into production by the end of 2000, serving as the replacement for the ageing XM, which was first produced in May of 1989.

In July 2007, Car ran a 2.7 litre V6 on its long term fleet and rated it for its "waftability" and comfortable interior, but felt it was a car that the driver needed time to adjust to. In isolation, the car's acceleration was regarded as "effortless" but not up to the standards set by similarly priced and equipped vehicles, such as the BMW 5 series of the era.

== Design ==
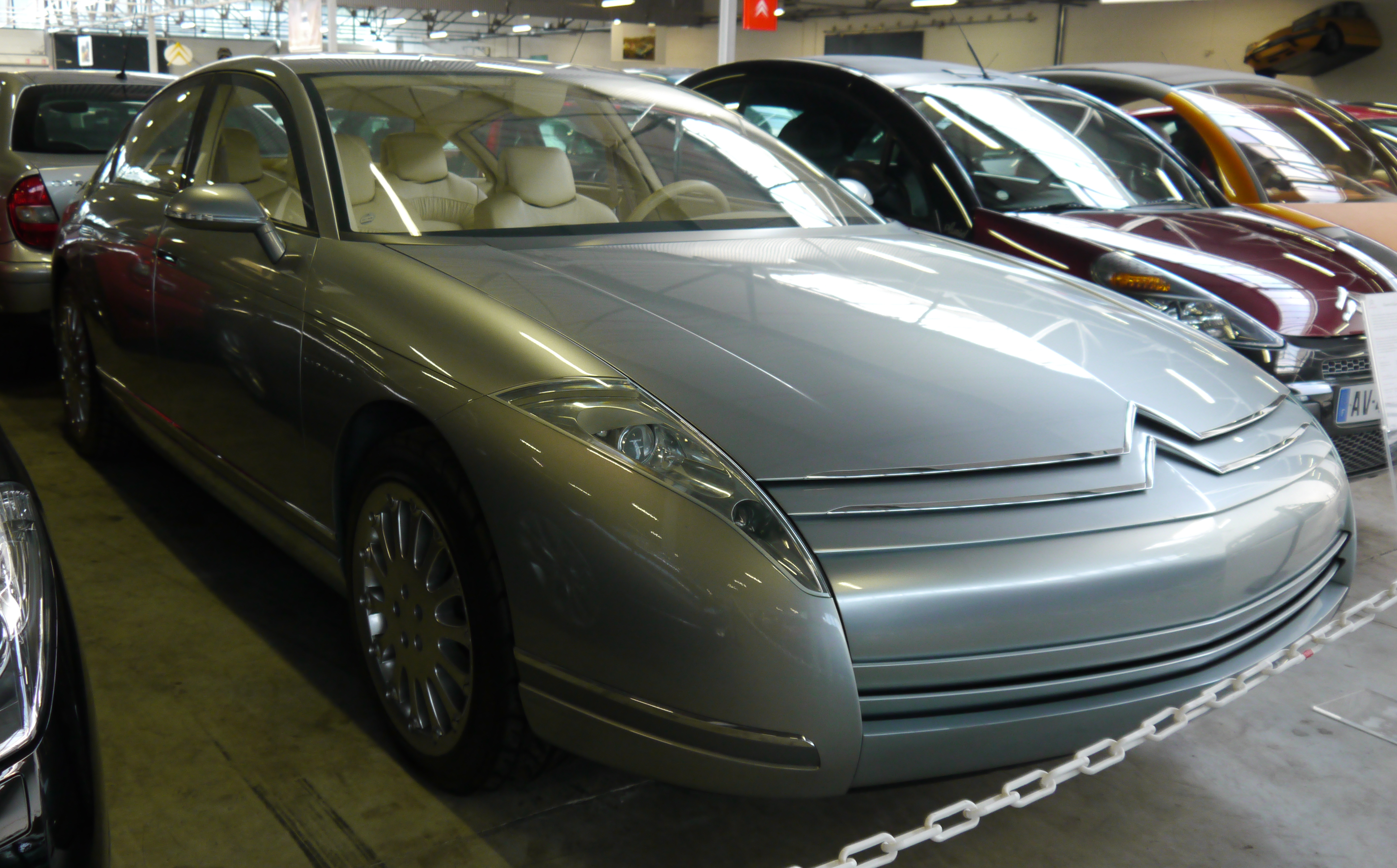
Citroën C6 Lignage concept

The Citroën C6 Lignage concept formed the basis of the Citroën C6, which was launched in November 2005, five years later than Citroën had originally planned. The XM ceased production in June 2000, and the first C6 rolled off the production line almost six years later.

=== Features ===
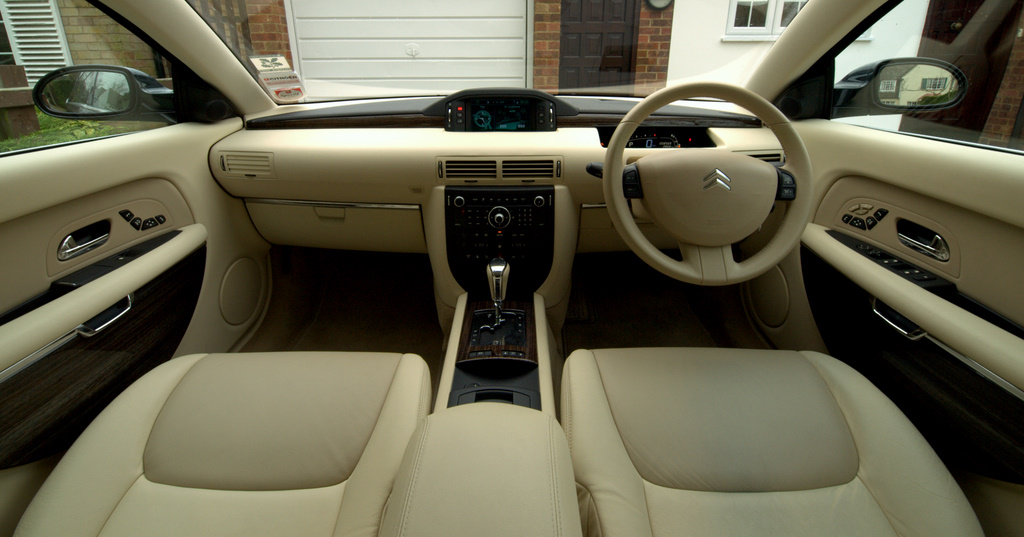
Interior

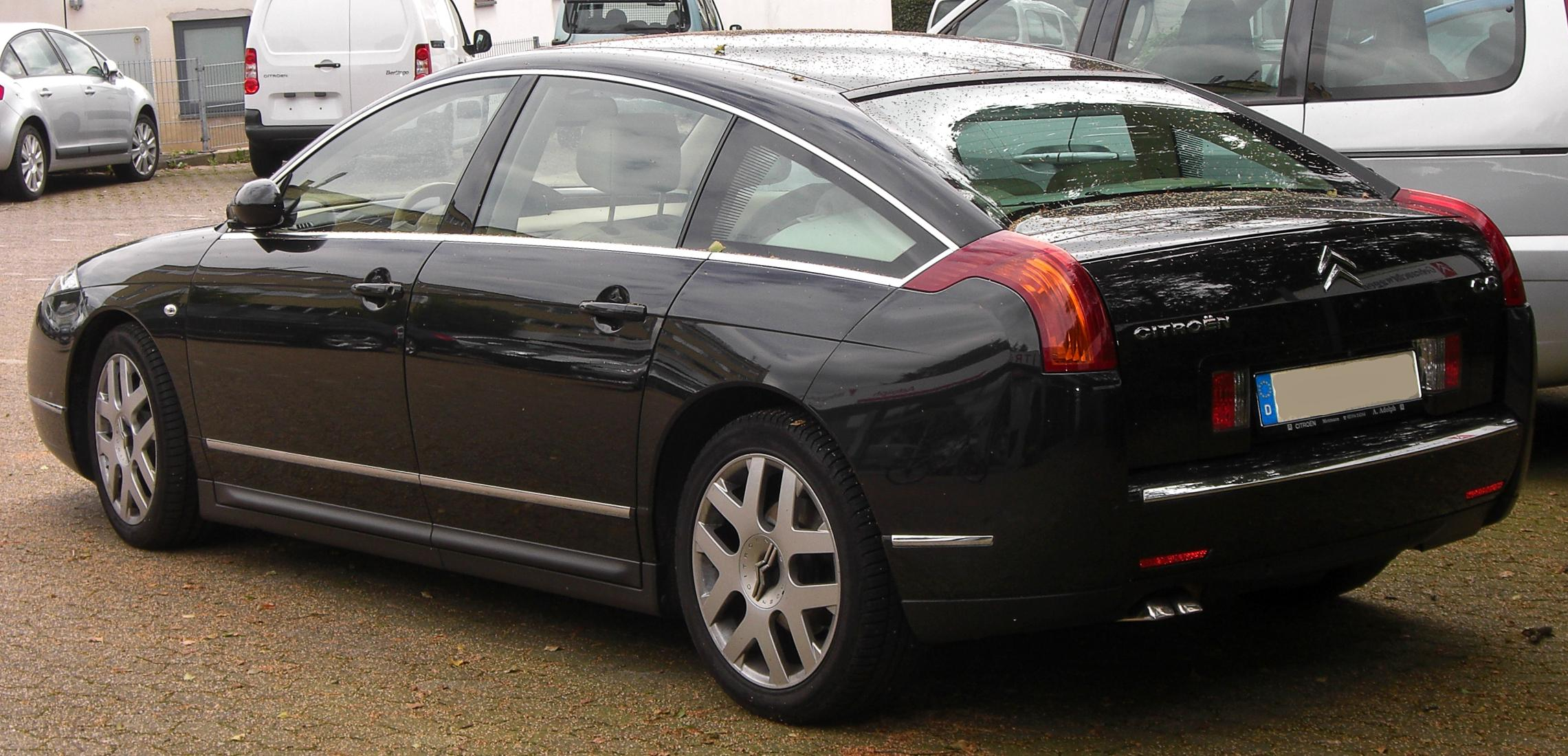
Rear side of the Citroën C6

The C6 is powered by either a 3.0 L ES9 V6 producing 211 PS (155 kW; 208 hp) or a 2.7 L V6 HDi diesel producing 204 PS (150 kW; 201 hp).

In October 2006 a 2.2 L HDi producing 170 PS (125 kW; 168 hp) with FAP, four cylinders, and a dual turbo was introduced. Land Rover used the DW12 engine in the Freelander 2 and Range Rover Evoque, where it generates 150–190 PS (110–140 kW; 148–187 hp).

In June 2009, the new 3.0 L V6 HDi diesel producing 240 PS (177 kW; 237 hp) replaced the 2.7 L V6 HDi.

The C6 has a fastback saloon profile, which is due in part to the concave rear window that resembles the Citroën CX. However, the C6 is a conventional saloon with a traditional trunk, and not a hatchback like the XM, its predecessor.

The C6 was aimed as a stylish alternative to executive cars, like the BMW 5 Series and the Audi A6, and it has been described as a "spaceship that rides on air", "charmingly idiosyncratic" and "refreshingly different".

Citroën hoped that the C6's selling point would be its innovative technology, including a heads-up display, a lane departure warning system, xenon directional headlamps (also available on the Citroën C4 and Citroën C5), Hydractive 3+ suspension with electronically controlled springing and damping, and a rear spoiler which automatically adjusts to speed and braking.

The C6 was the first car to obtain four stars in the pedestrian test rating of EuroNCAP, due to the inventive design, where the bonnet pops up by 65 mm using a pyrotechnic mechanism if a person/animal is hit, thus increasing the gap between the deformable bonnet, and the non deformable engine components below.

On an episode of Top Gear, Jeremy Clarkson tested the C6's Hydractive suspension by mounting a camera on it and driving it on the infield of England's Towcester Racecourse while filming a horse race. Despite the bumps and potholes on the infield, the C6 managed to provide a comfortable ride and stable video coverage of the race while moving at 60 kilometres per hour (37 mph). At the same time, a BMW 5 Series (with the M Sport package) performed the same test, but its suspension was unable to keep the camera upright.

The C6 immediately became a prominent vehicle among the fleet of executive cars at the Élysée Palace. Former Presidents of France, Jacques Chirac and Nicolas Sarkozy, have chosen the Citroën C6 as their official car. Chirac, in particular, used a pre-series car before the model was introduced. Although he travelled in a Citroën DS5 to be sworn in, François Hollande did use a C6 for some official duties.

== Worldwide production and sales figures ==
At launch, sales expectations across the model's lifespan were given as 20,000 per year. In July 2008, the C6 car configurator on Citroën UK's website no longer offered black as a colour choice for the popular Exclusive trim levels.

Year	Worldwide production	Worldwide sales	Notes
2005	700	TBA	
2006	9,100	TBA	
2007	7,300	TBA	By 2007, Citroën had manufactured 17,100 C6s.
2008	1,667	TBA	
2009	982	1,500	
2010	1,114	1,400	
2011	1,029	922	Total production reaches 22,004 units. Total sales reach 19,400 units.
2012	1,400	1,600	Total production reaches 23,400 units.

By October 2008, the manual transmission and the intermediate Lignage specification were no longer offered. Polar white was added to the colour options (replacing Deep Red). The standard navigation system, named until then "NaviDrive", was renamed "Concert Pack". The 3.0 V6 petrol engine was discontinued in February 2009 – only the 2.2 and 2.7 HDi options with six speed automatic gearboxes were offered, in base C6 or C6 Exclusive trim. In June 2009, the 2.7 HDi engine was replaced by the new 3.0 V6 HDi.

As of 2010, only the 3.0 HDi (240) Exclusive trim was offered in some markets, such as the United Kingdom. Options were limited to Sunroof, Lounge Pack (TGV rear seats) and "WiFi on Board", a 3G connectivity solution for the car that is little more than a MiFi box and is unrelated to the onboard telephony of the car.

In May 2012 Citroën ceased production of the C6 in right-hand drive. Rumours suggested the C6 was to be replaced by the Citroën DS9, based on the Citroën Numero 9 concept car, which would eventually go into production in 2020. The replacement of the Citroën C6 is the DS 9. Citroën ceased production of the C6 in December 2012, after 23,384 units had been built.

=== Safety ===
ANCAP test results Citroen C6 variant(s) as tested (2006)
Test	Score
Overall	5 /5 stars
Frontal offset	13.77/16
Side impact	15.04/16
Pole	2/2
Seat belt reminders	3/3
Whiplash protection	Not Assessed
Pedestrian protection	Good
Electronic stability control	Standard

== Citroën C6 (China: 2016–2023) ==
Citroën C6 II
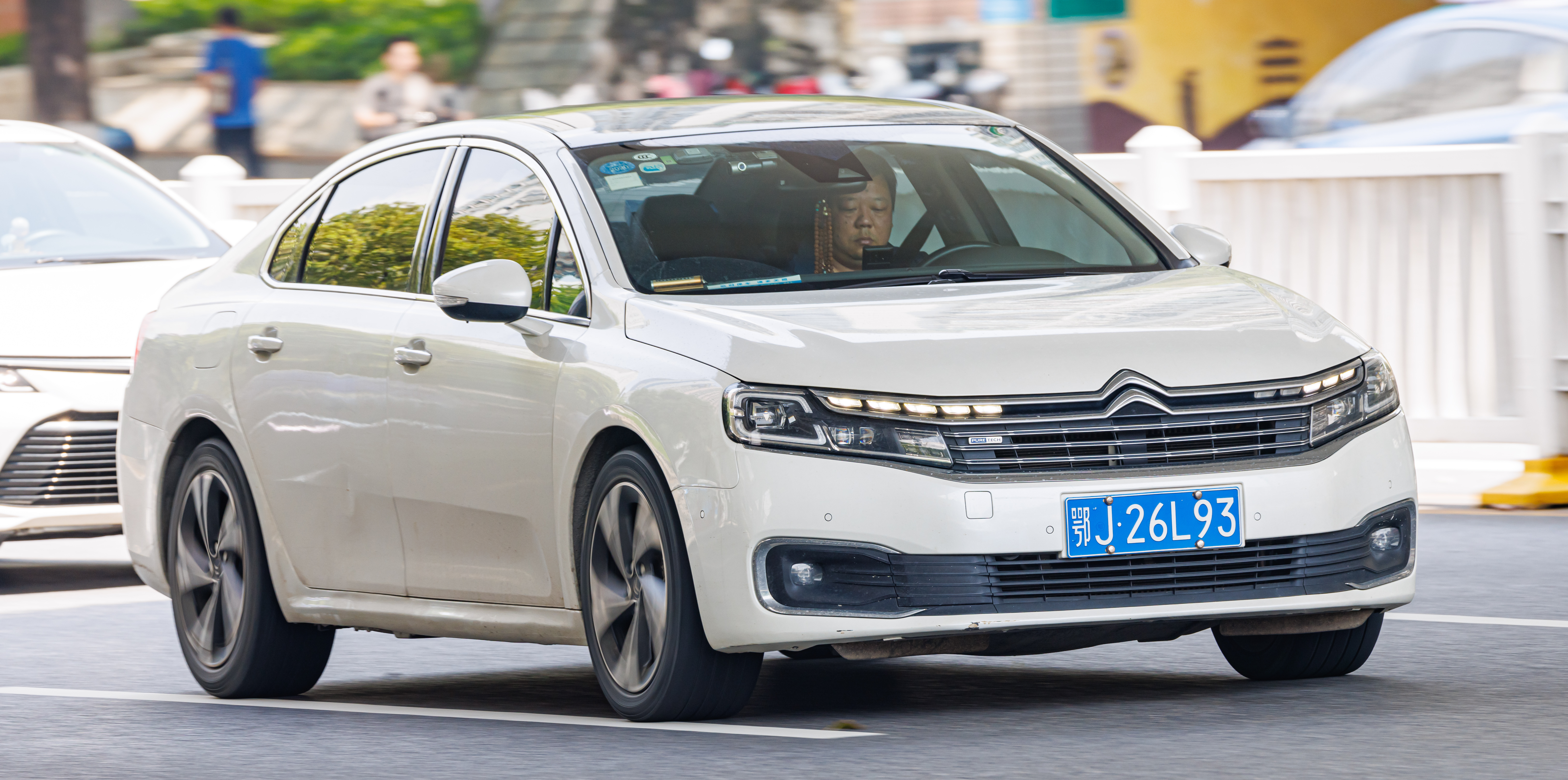

Overview
- Manufacturer: Citroën
- Production: 2016–2023
- Assembly: China: Wuhan (Dongfeng Peugeot-Citroën)

Body and chassis
- Class: Mid-size car (D)
- Body style: 4-door saloon
- Layout: FF layout or F4
- Platform: PSA PF3 platform
- Related: Dongfeng A9; Peugeot 508

Powertrain
- Engine: Petrol: 1.6 L PSA EP6DTS I4 turbo; 1.8 L EP8 I4 turbo
- Transmission: 6-speed automated manual

Dimensions
- Wheelbase: 2,900 mm (114.2 in)
- Length: 4,980 mm (196.1 in)
- Width: 1,858 mm (73.1 in)
- Height: 1,475 mm (58.1 in)
- Curb weight: 1,590–1,655 kg (3,505–3,649 lb)

A new car named C6 was sold in China since 2016, and is based on the PSA PF3 platform. It is a sister model of the Dongfeng A9. Prices in China started from ¥189,900 yuan to ¥279,900 yuan. The car is no longer for sale since 2023.

=== Total production ===
Year	China
2016	4,079
2017	5,915
2018	3,925
2019	2,431
2020	1,573
2021	7,877
2022	2,895
2023	6,017
2024	8
2025	1

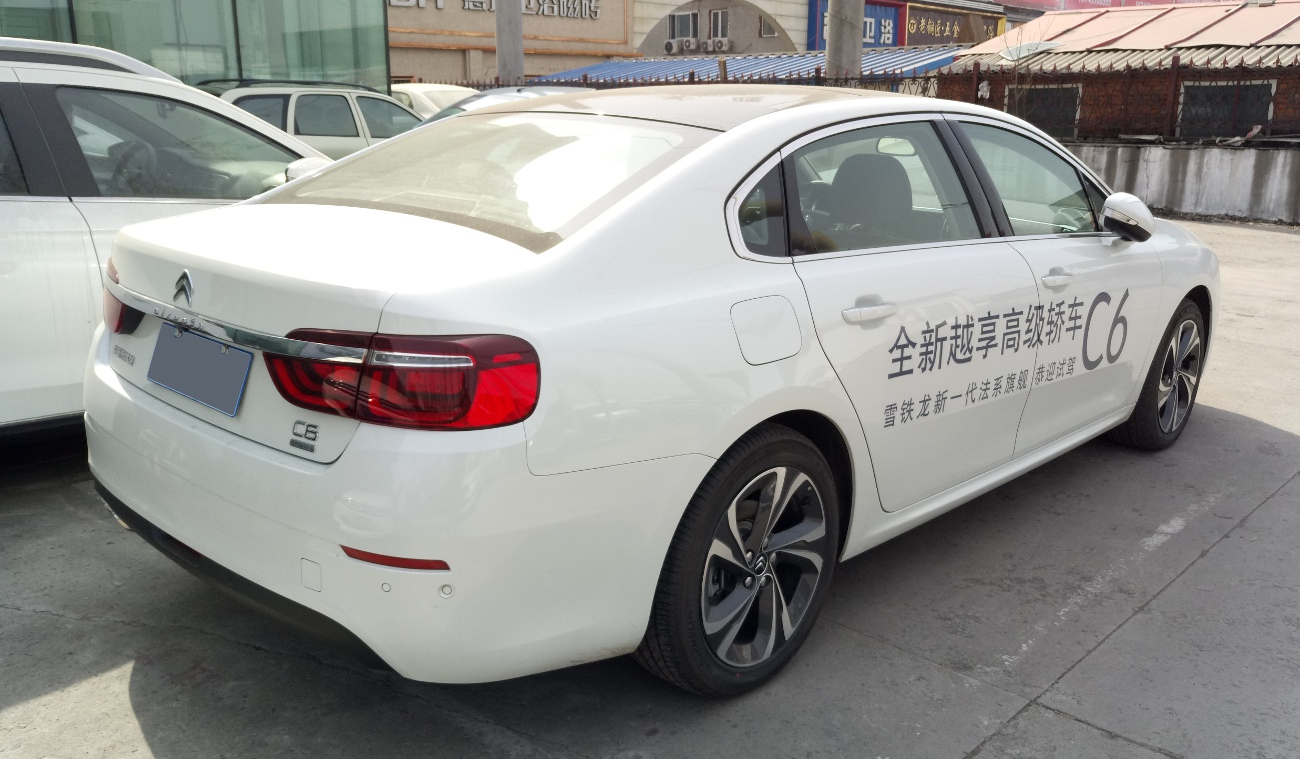
Second generation Citroën C6 (C6 II) rear view

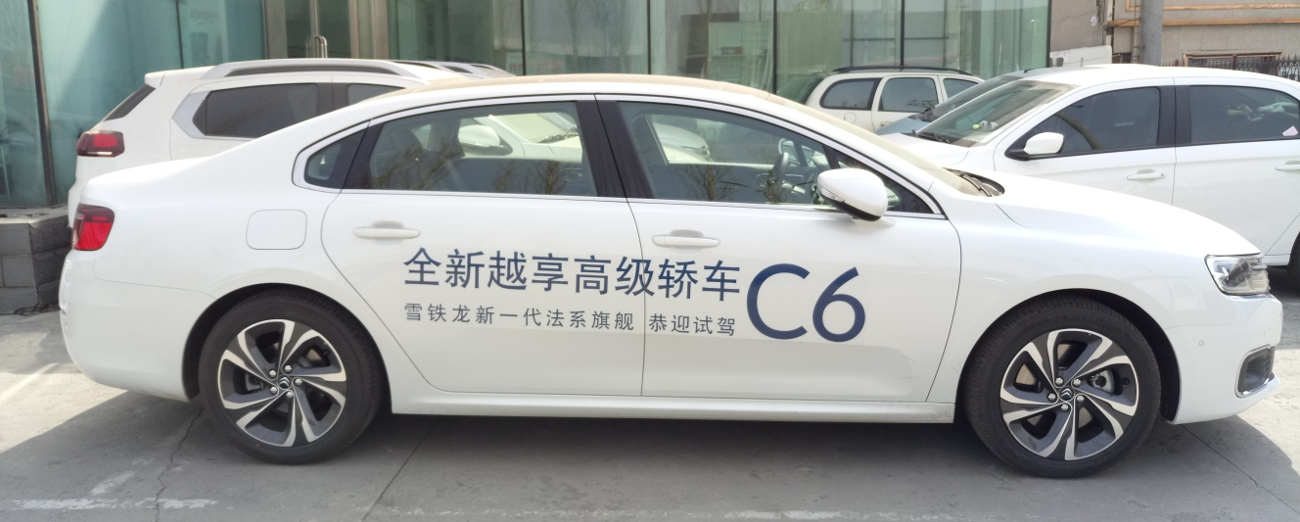
Second generation Citroën C6 based on the PSA EMP2 platform

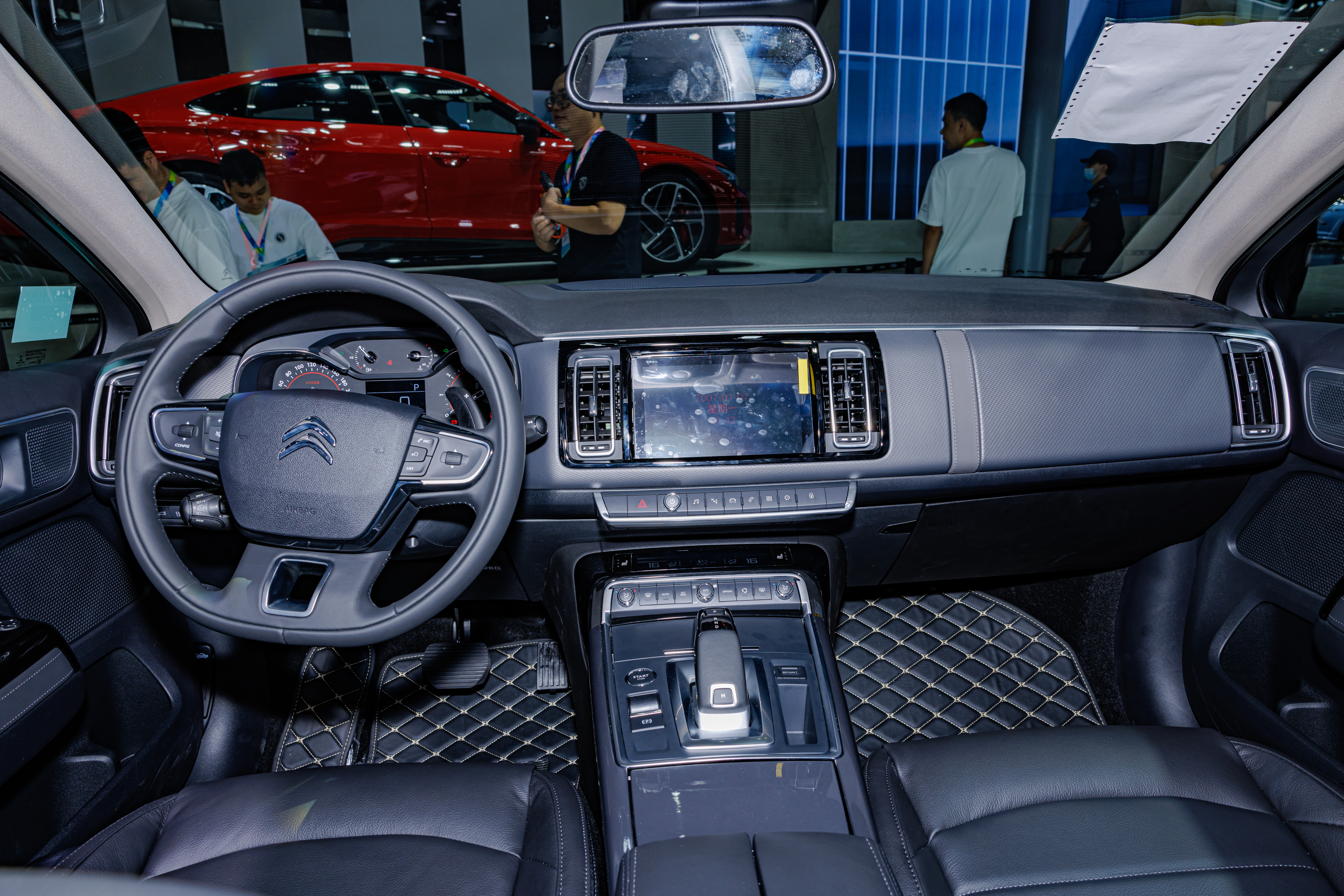
Interior
