= DS 9 =

Executive car by DS Automobiles

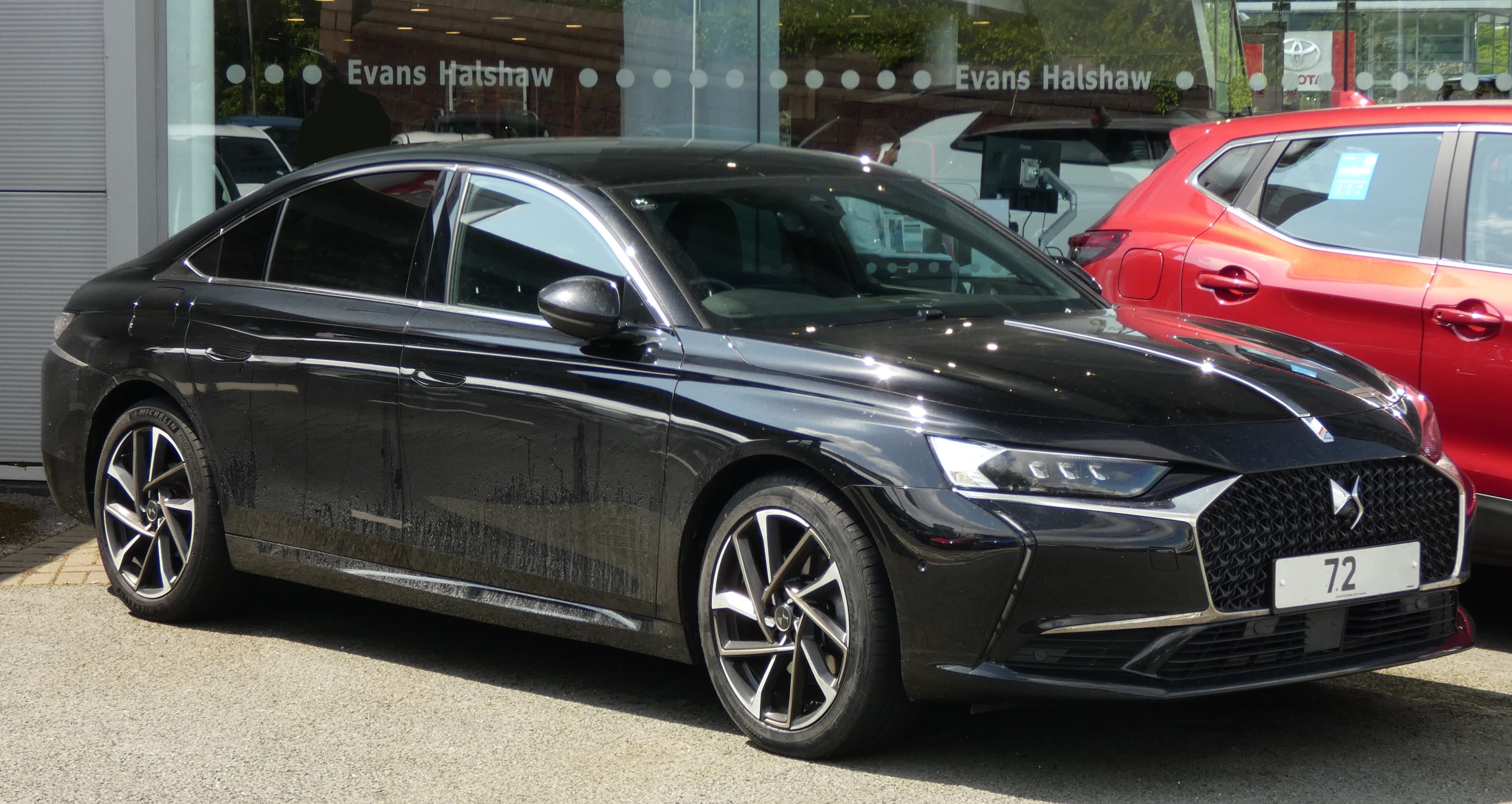

Overview
- Manufacturer: DS Automobiles
- Production: 01/2020–12/2023
- Assembly: China: Shenzhen (Baoneng Group)
- Designer: Romain Saquet

Body and chassis
- Class: Executive car (E)
- Body style: 4-door sedan
- Layout: Transverse Front-engine, front-wheel drive / four-wheel drive
- Platform: PSA EMP2 platform
- Related: Peugeot 508; Citroën C5 X

Powertrain
- Engine: Petrol: 1.6 L Turbocharger Prince (EP6FDT) I4; Petrol PHEV: 1.6 L Prince (EP6FDT/EP6CDTX) I4
- Electric motor: 80 kW Synchronous Electric Motor (DS 9 E-Tense)
- Transmission: 8-speed automatic (EAT 8)

Dimensions
- Wheelbase: 2,895 mm (114.0 in)
- Length: 4,940 mm (194.5 in)
- Width: 1,855 mm (73.0 in)
- Height: 1,460 mm (57.5 in)
- Curb weight: 1,615–1,984 kg (3,560–4,374 lb)

Chronology
- Predecessor: DS 5
- Successor: DS No. 8

The DS 9 is an executive car introduced in 2020 by DS. The company's first vehicle to be marketed to both Europe and Asia but assembled solely in China, the DS 9 serves as the flagship DS luxury-premium line, slotted above the DS 3, DS 4 and the DS 7 Crossback in size.

== Presentation ==
Originally, the DS 9 (internal code X83) was to be unveiled in April 2019 at Auto Shanghai, but its presentation was postponed for the first time in November for Auto Guangzhou in China, then a second time until March 2020.

Following the end of the Changan PSA Automobiles (CAPSA) joint venture of PSA and Changan Automobile, Baoneng Group which took over the Shenzhen plant where Chinese DS are built, signed an agreement to produce DS, including the next DS 9 in Shenzhen. On 20 February 2020, DS announced the imminent presentation of a new model.

The DS 9 was unveiled to the press on 27 February 2020, and was due to make its first public appearance at the 90th edition of the Geneva Motor Show on 3 March 2020. The Swiss show, however, was cancelled at the last moment due to the COVID-19 pandemic. Unlike the DS 7 Crossback, which is produced both in France and in China, the DS 9 is assembled only in China by Baoneng's Shenzhen factory.

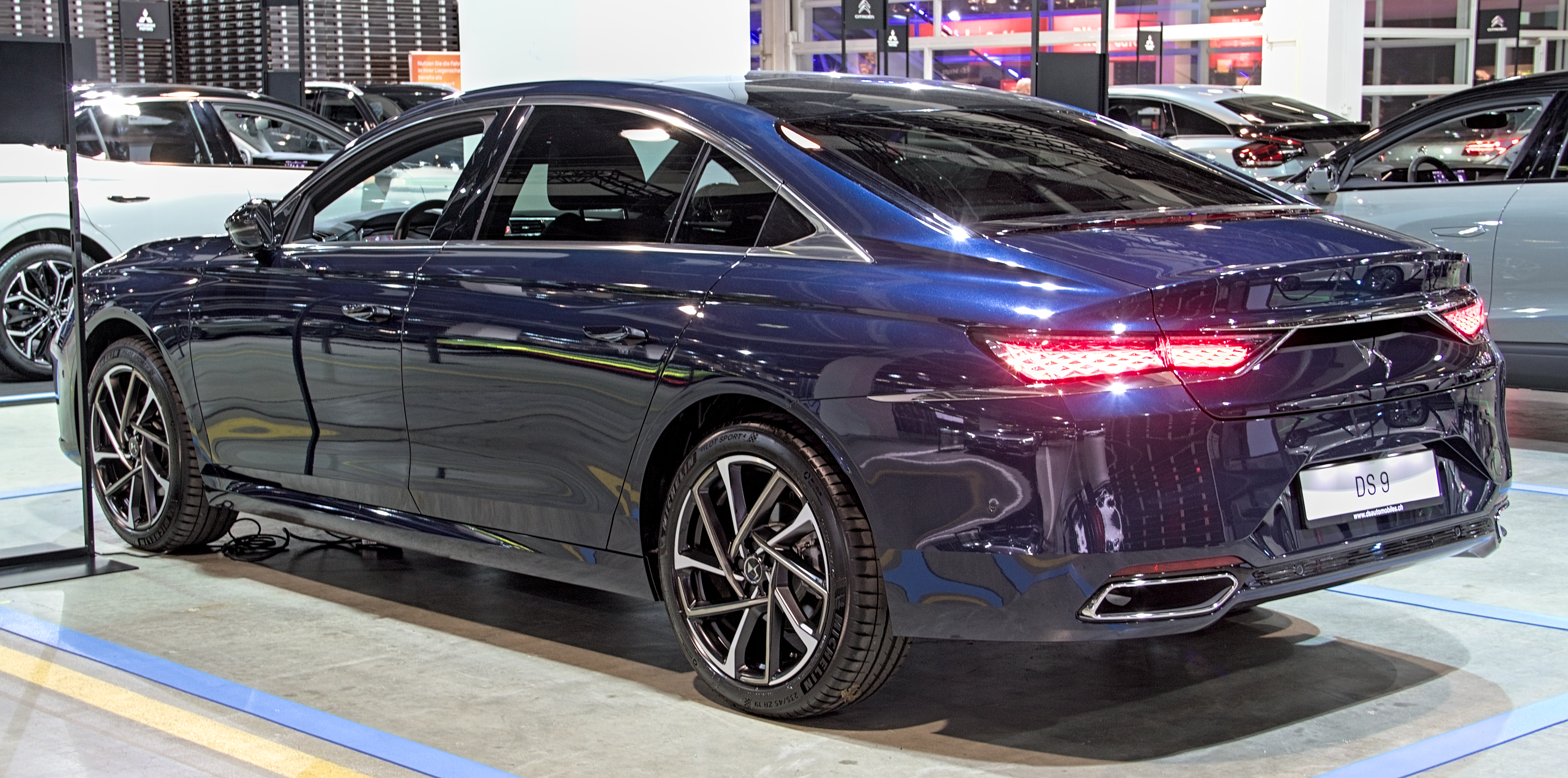
Rear view

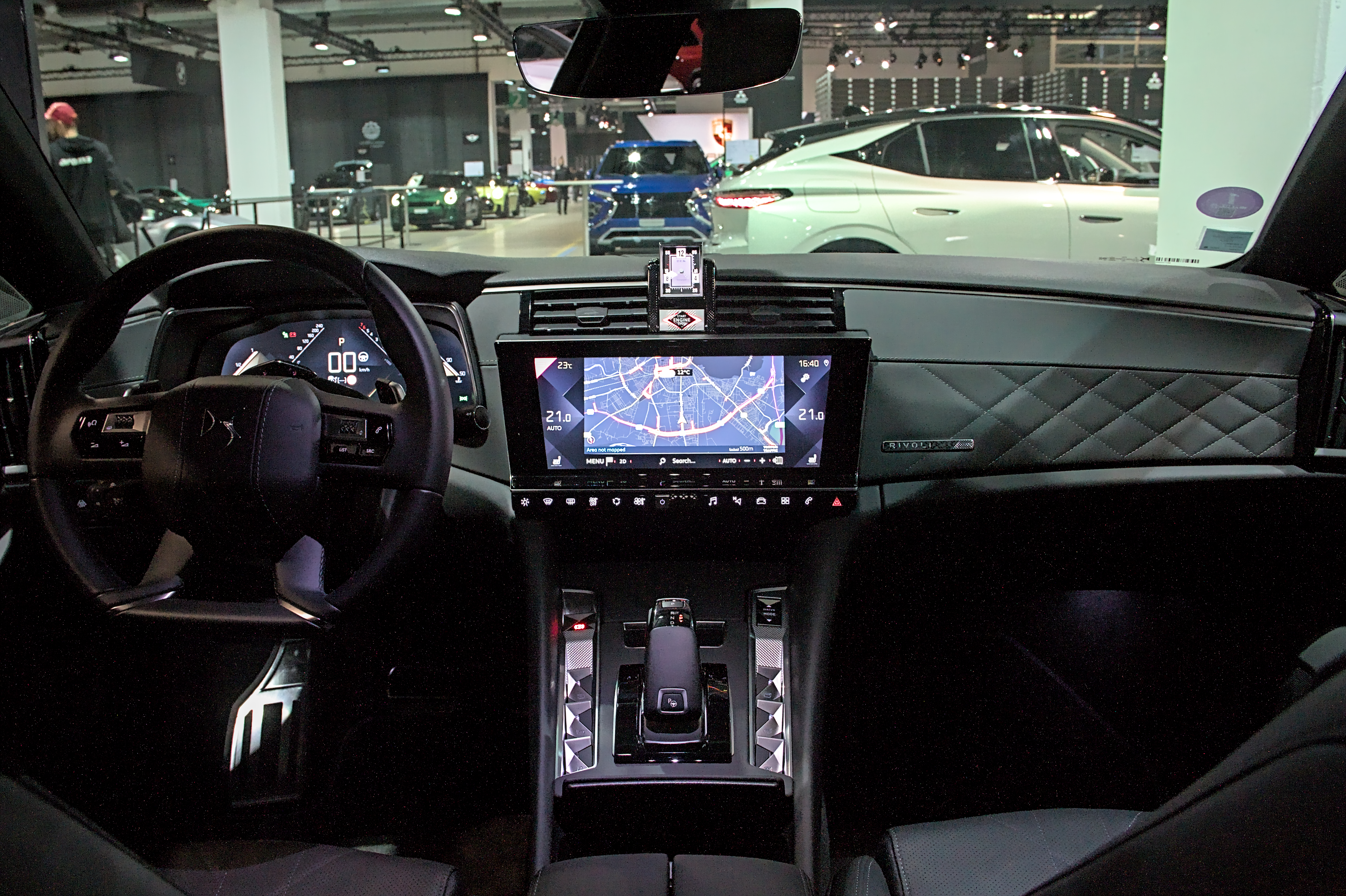
Interior

== Technical characteristics ==
The DS 9 is based on the EMP2 modular technical platform of Groupe PSA. Its dashboard is largely inspired by that of the DS 7 Crossback.

== Engines ==
The DS sedan is available with the 1.6-litre turbocharged petrol and eTense Hybrid (PHEV) version, with the 1.6 turbo petrol engine and an electric motor. The combined system output here in the DS 9 sedan will be 225 PS (165 kW; 222 hp). The 225 PS variant will be joined later by 250 PS (184 kW; 247 hp) FWD and 360 PS (265 kW; 355 hp) AWD eTense variants.

== Safety ==
Euro NCAP test results DS 9 1.6 hybrid (LHD) (2022)
Test	Points	%
Overall:	4 /5 stars	
Adult occupant:	30.4	79%
Child occupant:	42.2	86%
Pedestrian:	36.4	67%
Safety assist:	10.7	67%

== Sales ==
Year	China		
Year	DS 9	eTense	Total
2023	287	46	333
2024	28	10	38
2025	3	—	3
