= Opel Grandland =

Compact crossover SUV

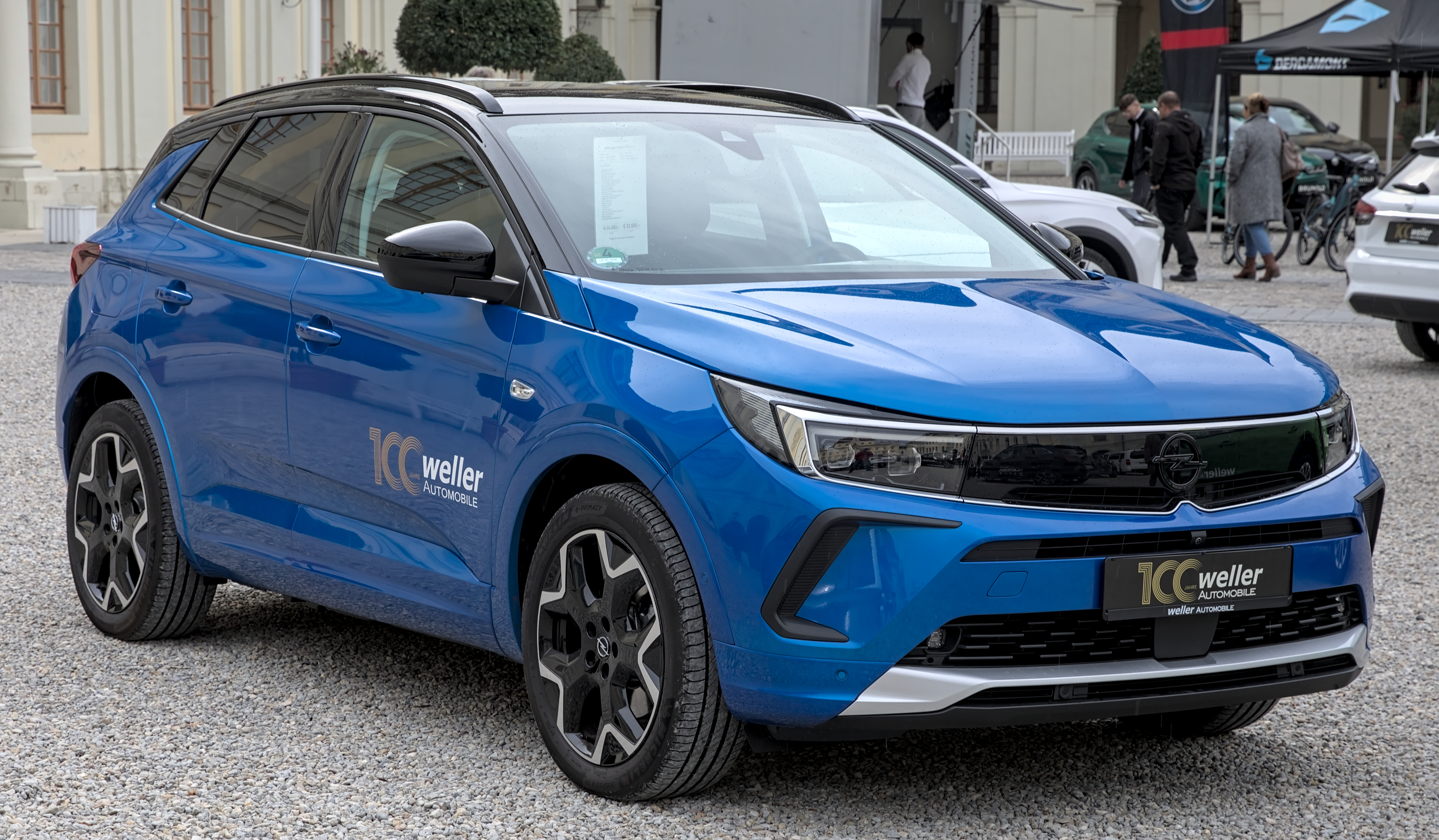

Overview
- Manufacturer: Opel
- Production: 2017–present

Body and chassis
- Class: Compact crossover SUV (C)
- Body style: 5-door SUV
- Layout: Front-engine, front-wheel-drive; Front-engine, all-wheel-drive

Chronology
- Predecessor: Opel Antara; Opel Zafira; Chevrolet Captiva

The Opel Grandland (Vauxhall Grandland in the United Kingdom) is a compact crossover SUV produced by the German manufacturer Opel. It was originally known as the Opel and Vauxhall Grandland X, until the facelift of the first generation model when it dropped the X suffix in the nameplate. It was introduced as a replacement for the Opel Antara, and also replaced the Opel Zafira in 2019.

The second generation model was released in April 2024. It is based on the Stellantis' STLA Medium platform, shared with a wider range of other Stellantis vehicles.

== First generation (2017) ==
First generation
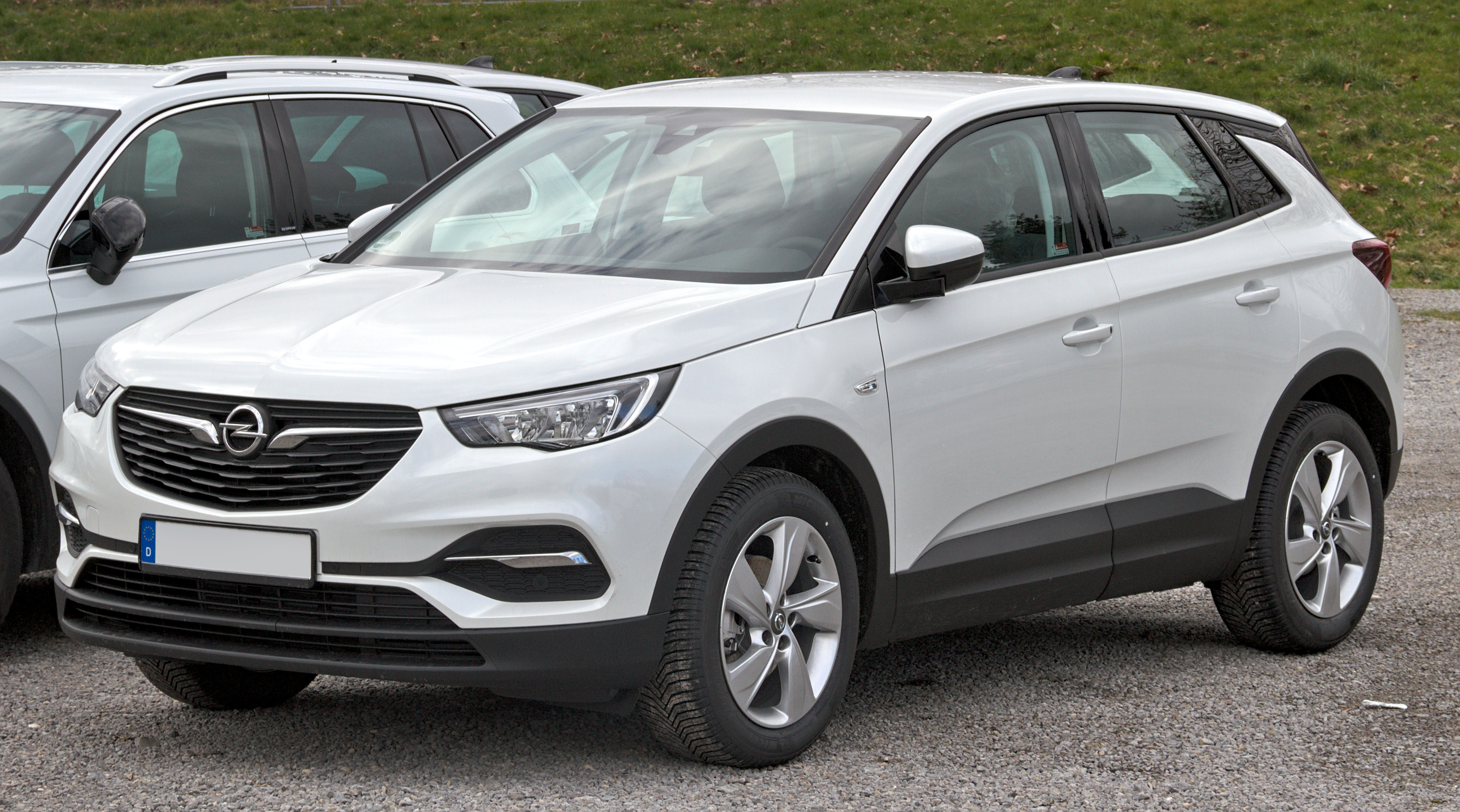

Overview
- Production: 2017–2024
- Assembly: France: Sochaux (PSA Sochaux Plant); Germany: Eisenach (Opel Eisenach); Namibia: Walvis Bay (POAN)
- Designer: Uwe Müller

Body and chassis
- Platform: PSA EMP2
- Related: Citroën C5 Aircross; DS 7 Crossback; Peugeot 3008 II; Peugeot 5008 II

Powertrain
- Engine: Petrol: 1.2 L EB2DTS turbo I3; 1.6 L EP6FDT turbo I4; Petrol PHEV: 1.6 L EP6FDT/CDTX turbo I4; Diesel: 1.5 L DV5 BlueHDi I4; 1.6 L DV6F BlueHDi I4; 2.0 L DW10 BlueHDi I4
- Electric motor: 1 or 2 Permanent magnet AC synchronous motor (PHEV, integrated with the eEAT8 gearbox)
- Power output: 118 hp (120 PS; 88 kW) (DV5, DV6); 130 hp (132 PS; 97 kW) (EB2DTS); 178 hp (180 PS; 133 kW) (EP6FDT, DW10); 201 hp (204 PS; 150 kW) (EP6CDTX)
- Transmission: 6-speed manual; 8-speed automatic
- Battery: 13.2 kWh Li-ion (PHEV)

Dimensions
- Wheelbase: 2,675 mm (105.3 in)
- Length: 4,477 mm (176.3 in)
- Width: 1,856 mm (73.1 in)
- Height: 1,609 mm (63.3 in)
- Kerb weight: 1,350–1,575 kg (2,976.2–3,472.3 lb)

Plans for the Grandland X were known as early as May 2012, before PSA Peugeot Citroën officially indicated in December of that year that it would build the eventual replacement for the Zafira.

The Grandland X was officially revealed on 18 April 2017 as Opel's flagship crossover SUV and premiered at the 2017 Frankfurt Motor Show. Opel started taking orders for the Grandland X in June 2017 and more than 100,000 orders were made by September 2018.

The Grandland I is based on the PSA EMP2 platform which is shared with related models which include the Peugeot 3008 II, Peugeot 5008 II, DS 7 Crossback and Citroën C5 Aircross. However, its design intellectual property was registered by General Motors as the vehicle was developed under its ownership.

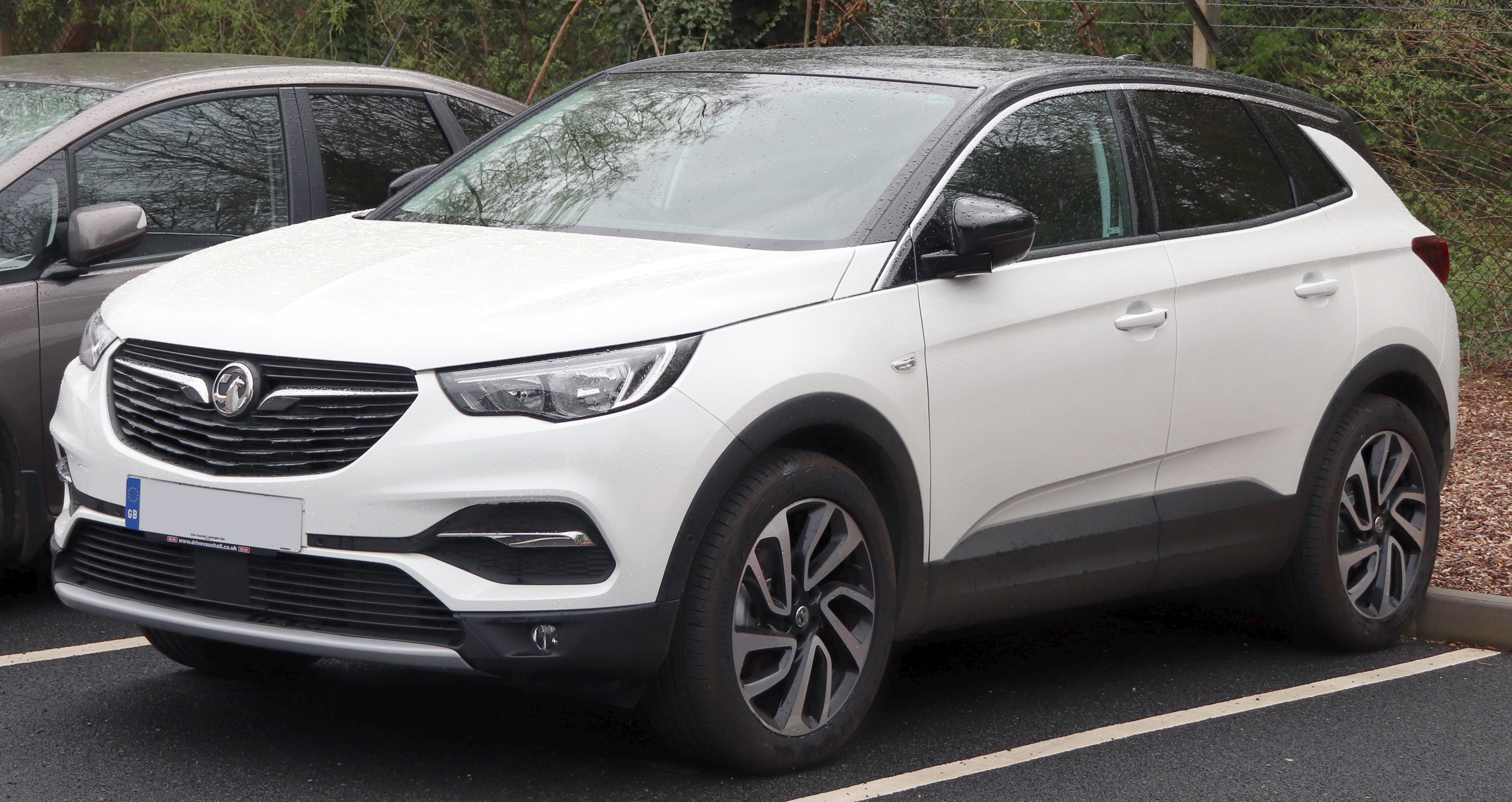
Vauxhall Grandland X

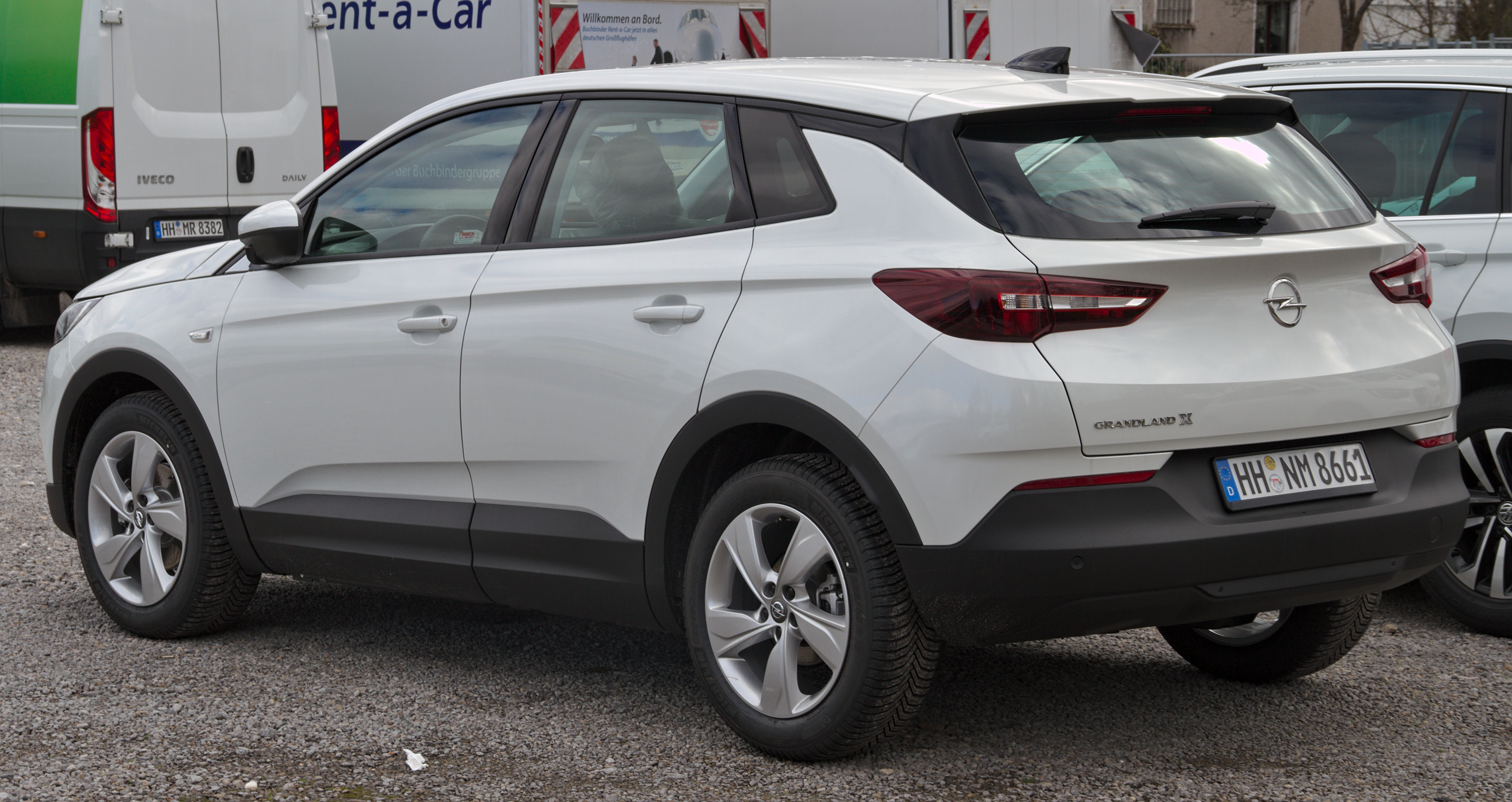
Opel Grandland X (rear)

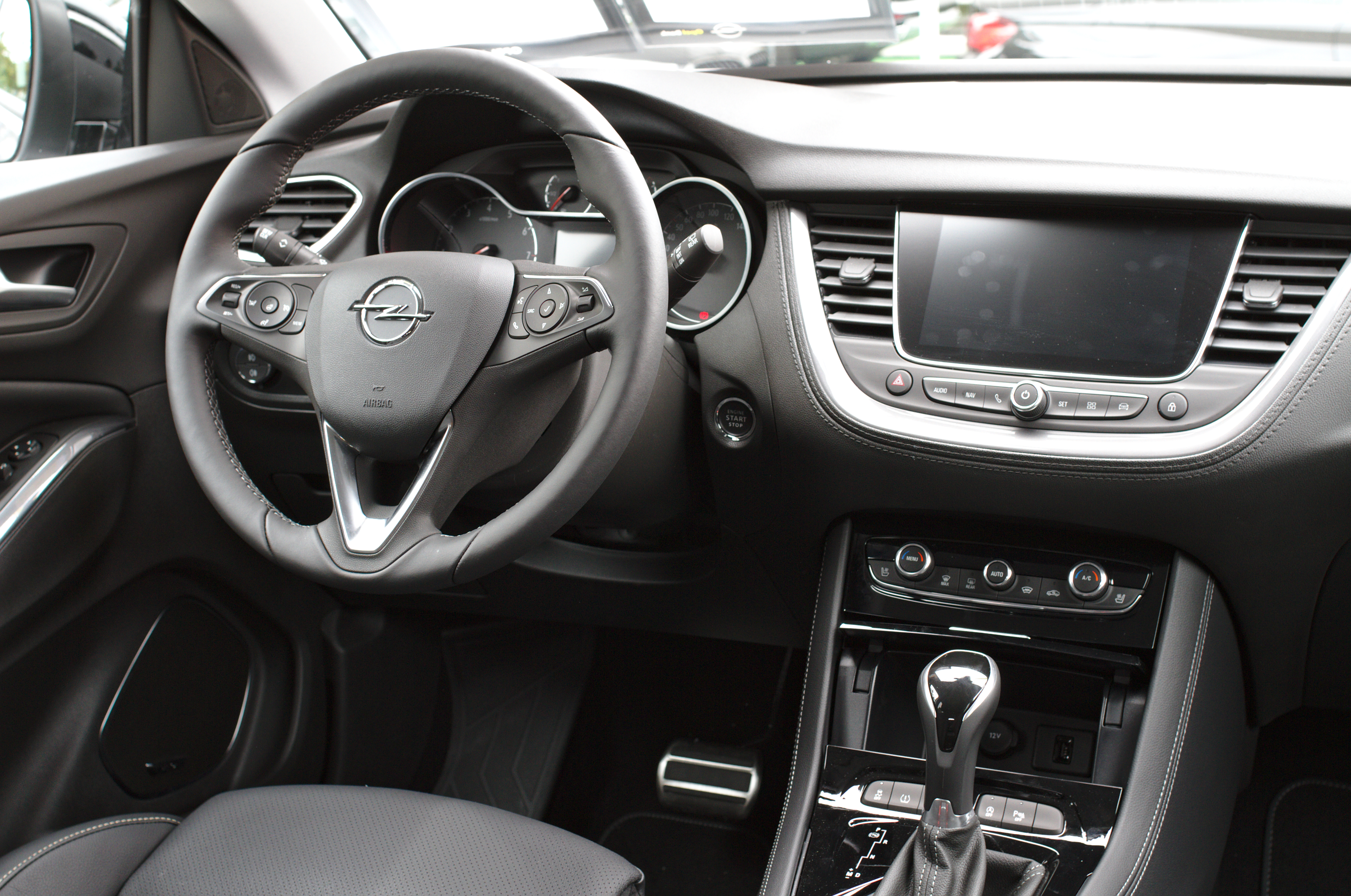
Interior (pre-facelift)

=== Facelift ===
In June 2021, the Grandland X received a facelift and was renamed to just Grandland, dropping the 'X' suffix. Changes includes the adoption of Opel's 'Vizor' front fascia (debut on the Mokka), new matrix LED lighting technology, a revamped interior with a new dual touchscreen layout, new gear selector for the automatic transmission which is only available for the 1.5 CDTI engine and added safety features.

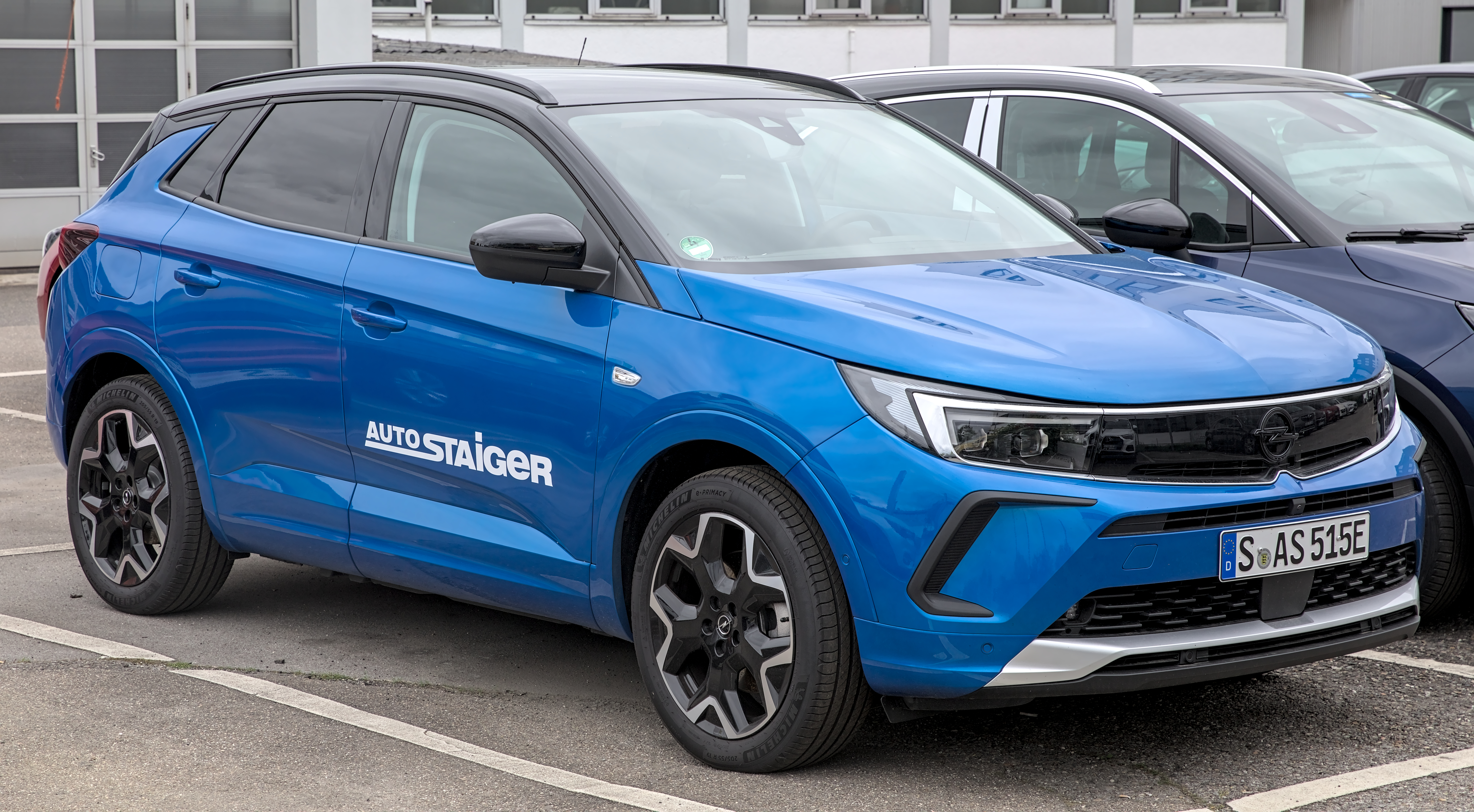
Opel Grandland PHEV (facelift)

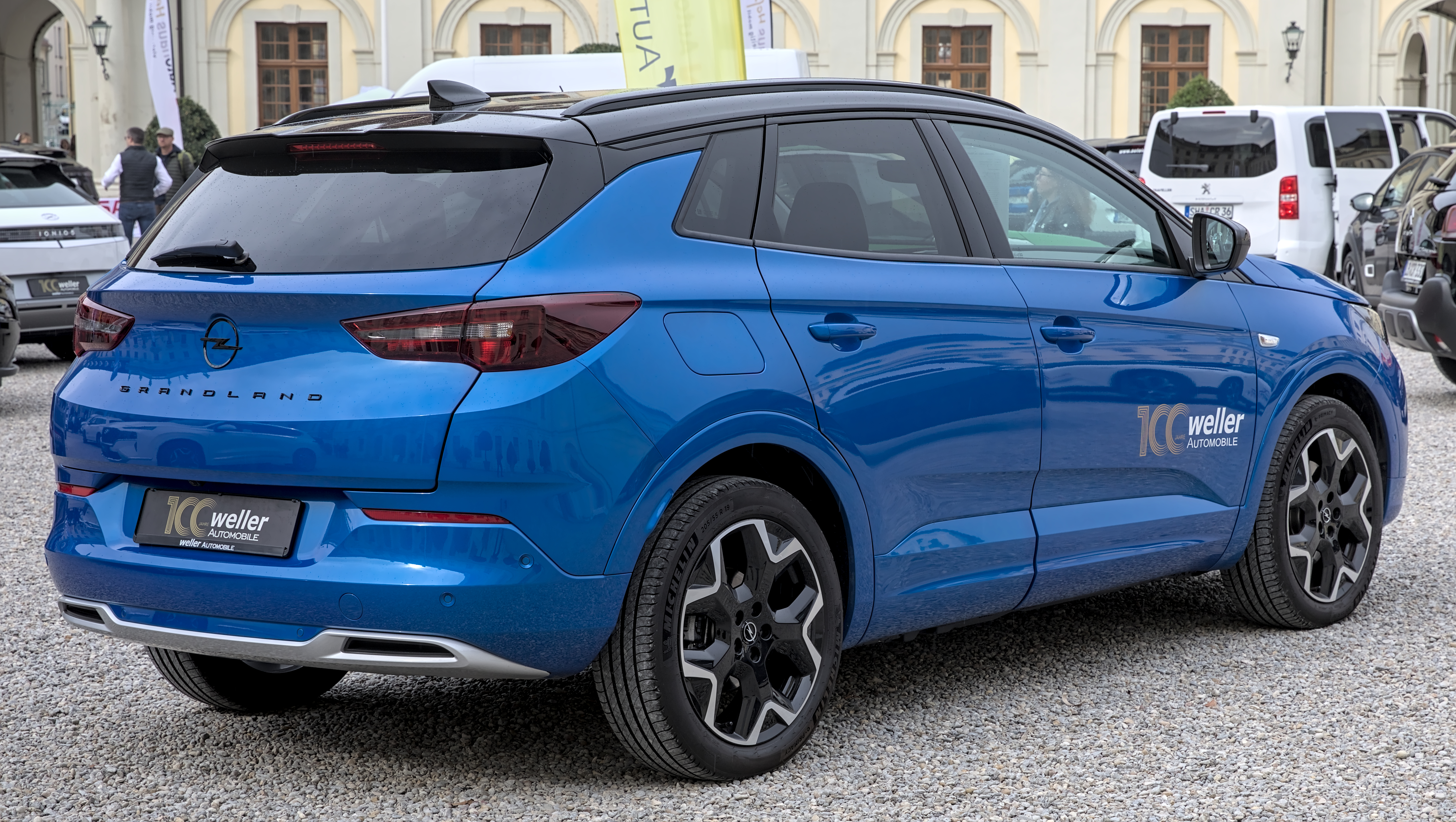
Opel Grandland PHEV (facelift)

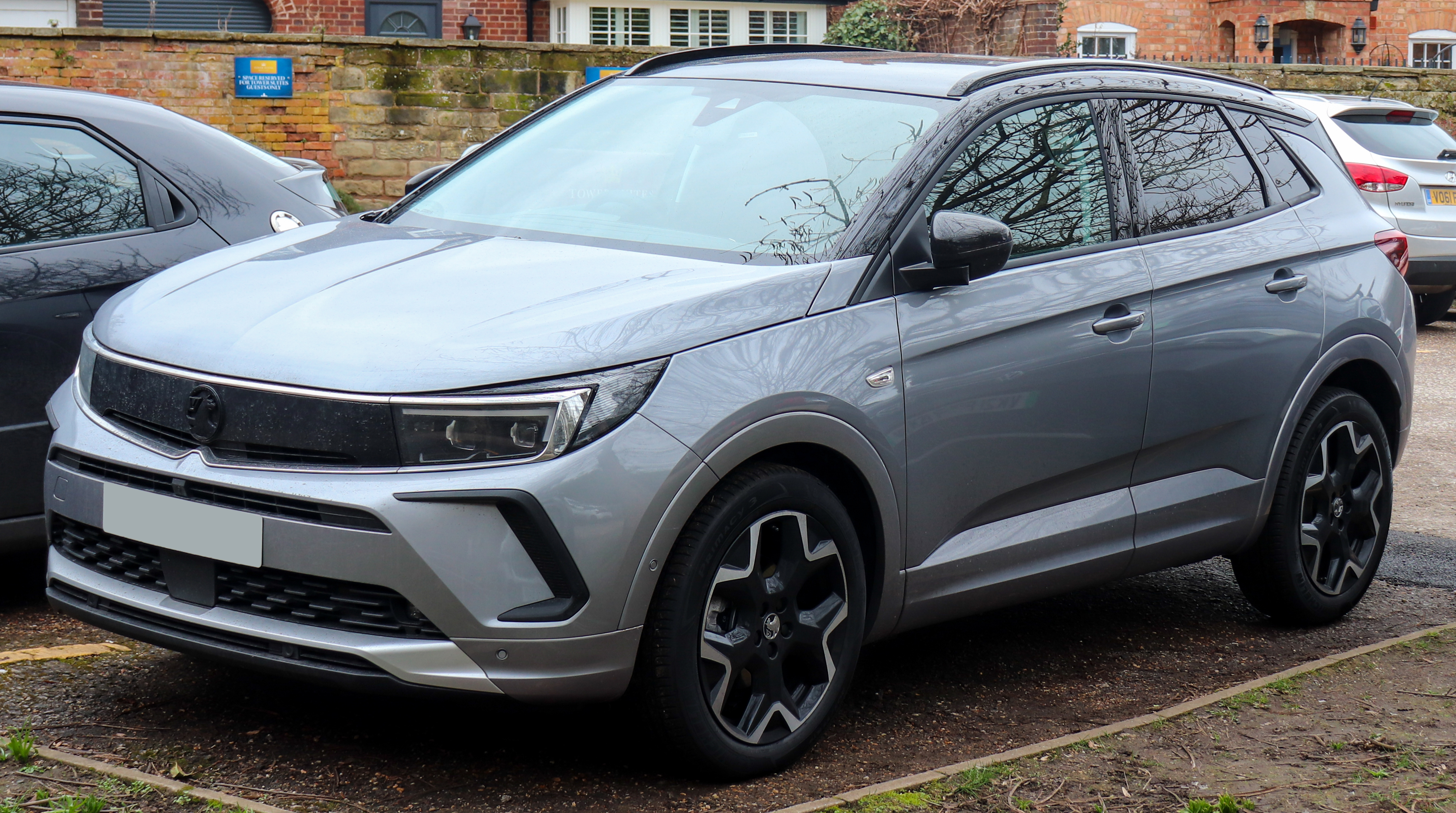
Vauxhall Grandland Ultimate (facelift)

=== Safety ===
Euro NCAP test results* Opel/Vauxhall Grandland X 1.6 diesel (LHD) (2017)
Test	Points	%
Overall:	4 /5 stars	
Adult occupant:	32.1	84%
Child occupant:	42.8	87%
Pedestrian:	26.8	63%
Safety assist:	7.2	60%

== Second generation (2024) ==
Second generation
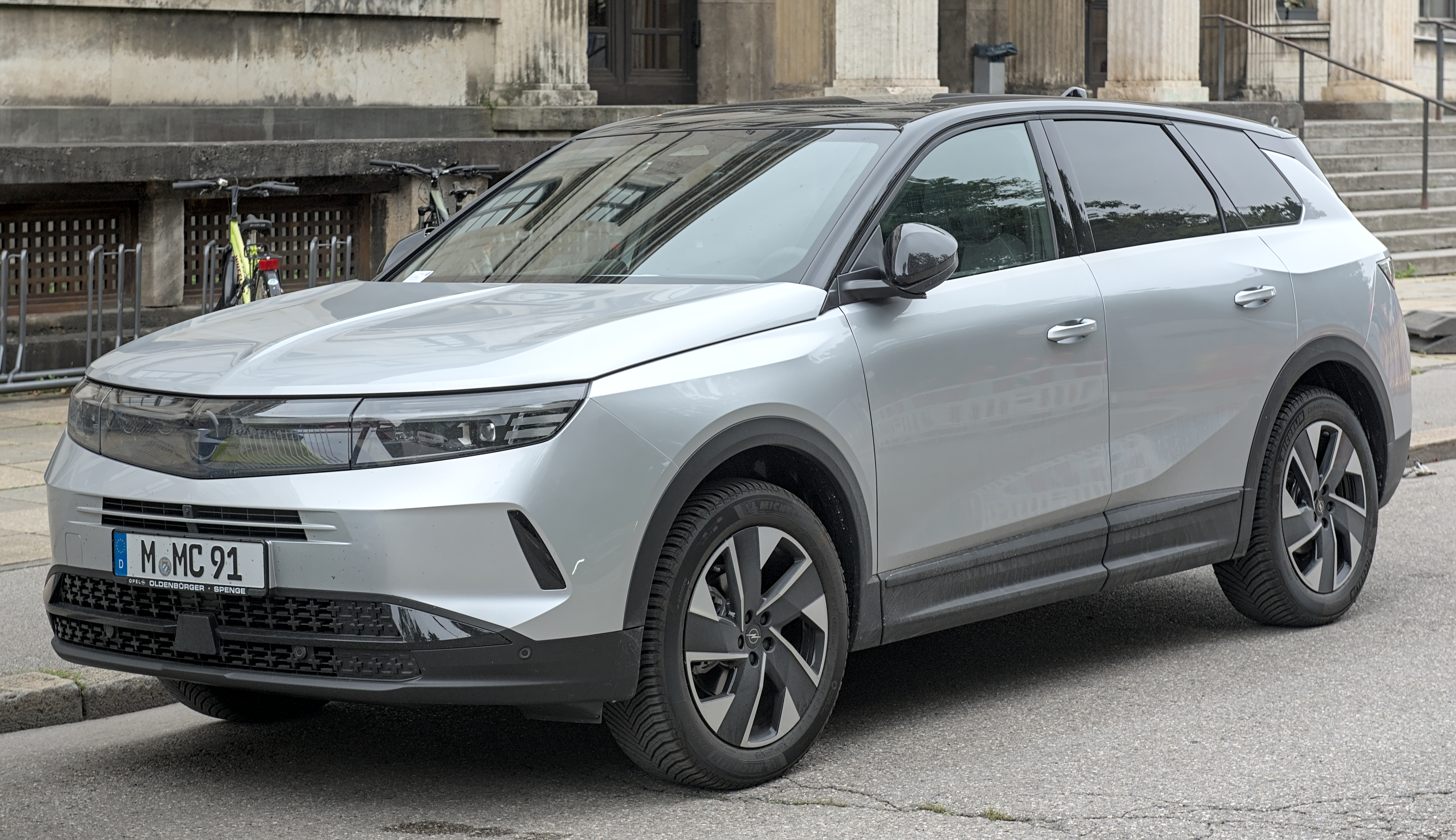

Overview
- Production: 2024–present
- Assembly: Germany: Eisenach (Stellantis Eisenach Plant)

Body and chassis
- Layout: Front-engine, front-wheel-drive; Front-motor, front-wheel drive (Electric); Dual-motor, all-wheel-drive (Electric)
- Platform: STLA Medium
- Related: Citroën C5 Aircross; Jeep Compass; Peugeot 3008 III; Peugeot 5008 III

Powertrain
- Engine: Petrol hybrid: 1.2 L EB2LTEDH2 turbo I3; 1.6 L EP6FADTXD turbo I4
- Electric motor: Permanent magnet AC synchronous motor
- Transmission: 6-speed e-DCT; 7-speed e-DCT; 1-speed direct-drive fixed gear ratio (Electric)
- Hybrid drivetrain: Mild hybrid (MHEV); Plug-in hybrid (PHEV)
- Battery: Lithium-ion NMC: 0.43 kWh (Hybrid); 17.9 kWh (Plug-in Hybrid); 73.7 kWh, 82.2 kWh or 97 kWh (Electric)
- Electric range: PHEV: 63–87 km (39–54 mi) (WLTP); Electric: 504–680 km (313–423 mi) (WLTP)

Dimensions
- Wheelbase: 2,784 mm (109.6 in)
- Length: 4,650 mm (183.1 in)
- Width: 1,905 mm (75.0 in)
- Height: 1,660 mm (65.4 in)
- Kerb weight: 1,600–2,132 kg (3,527.4–4,700.3 lb)

The second generation Grandland was officially revealed on 22 April 2024 and is the third vehicle based on the Stellantis' STLA Medium platform. In addition to versions powered by an internal combustion engine, an all-electric variant also became available.

=== Overview ===
The Grandland borrows design elements from the Experimental concept car. These include the "3D Visor" front fascia with an illuminated logo, Intelli-Lux Pixel HD lighting system, an option of a dual tone exterior colour, and the first Opel/Vauxhall production model to feature illuminated brand lettering in centre on the full-width taillights.

The interior uses 100% recyclable materials for the fabric and upholstery. There is a 16-inch central touchscreen infotainment system, a small fully digital instrument cluster, an Intelli-HUD head-up display, Intelli-Seat feature in the front seats certified by "Aktion Gesunder Rücken e. V." and a Pure Mode which reduces content on the three displays to eliminate distractions in certain driving conditions.

The Grandland has over 35 L (1.2 cu ft) of interior storage spaces. The main highlights are the Pixel Box which has an illuminated translucent glass surface surrounding the fabric upholstery, with a wireless smartphone charger slot behind the glass piece.

On 13 June 2025, an AWD version of the electric Grandland was announced. Power was raised to 239 kW (325 PS; 321 hp) and 509 N⋅m (375 lb⋅ft) of torque. As of June 2025, it was the most powerful model in Opel's lineup.

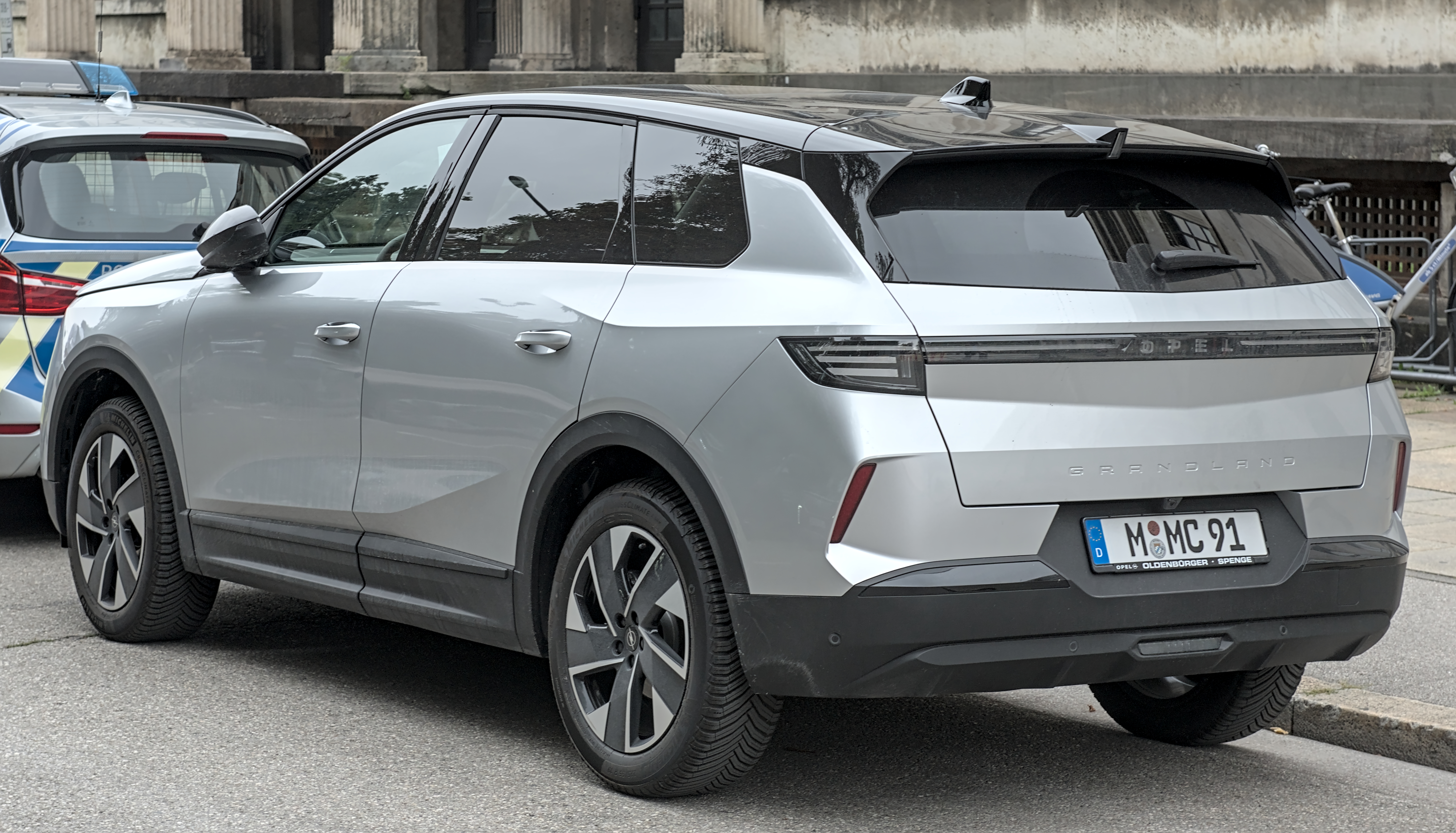
Rear view

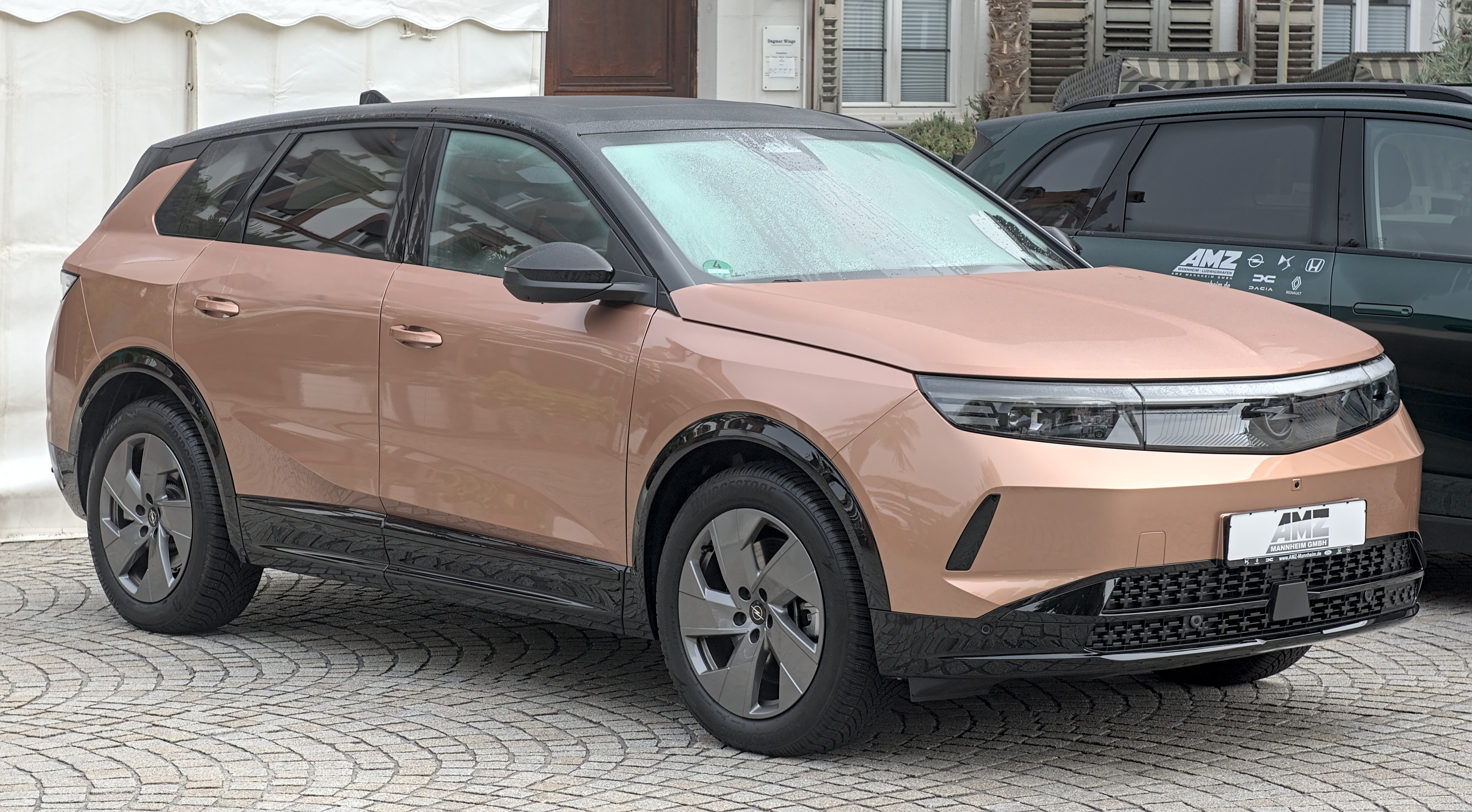
Grandland Electric

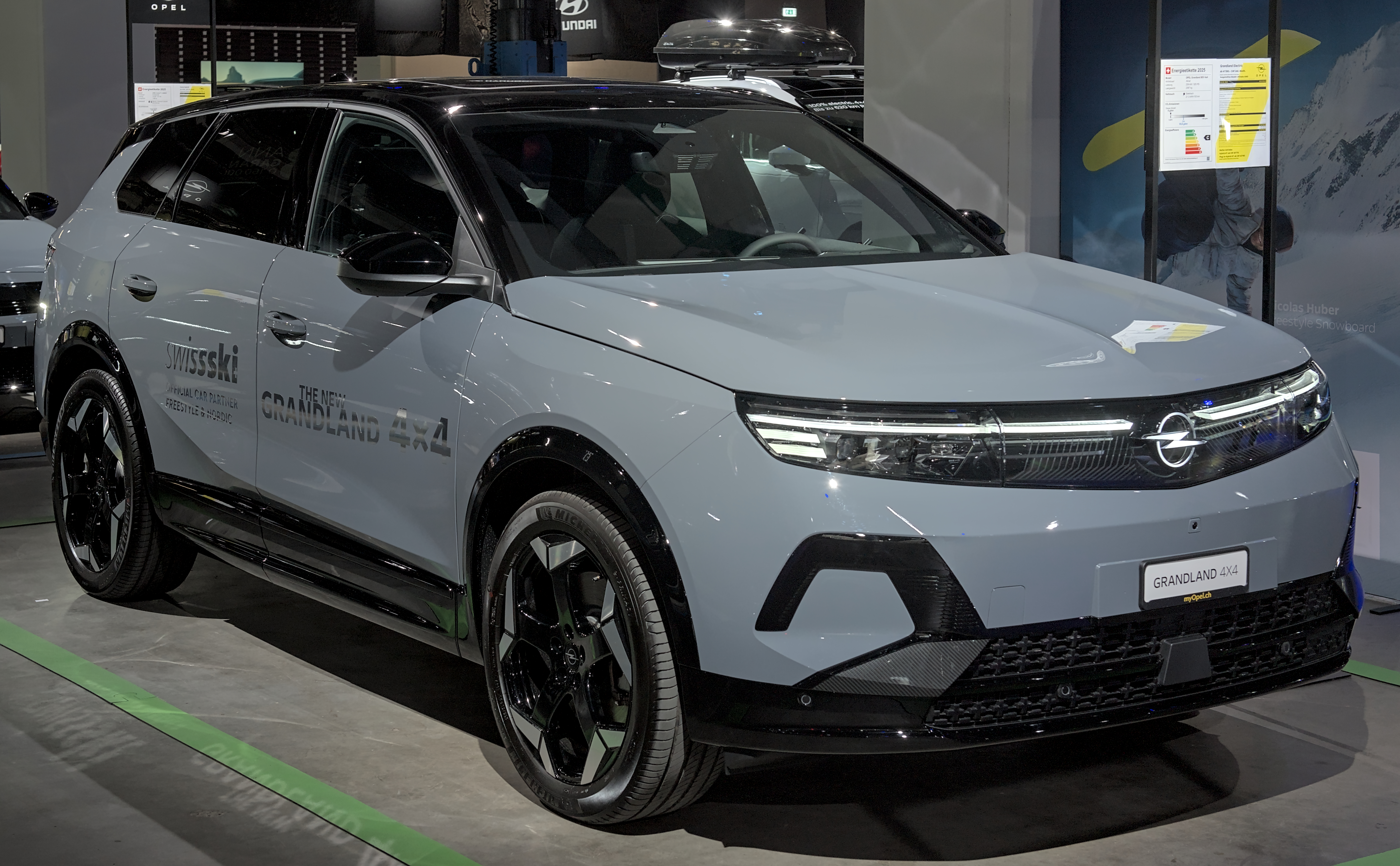
Grandland Electric 4x4

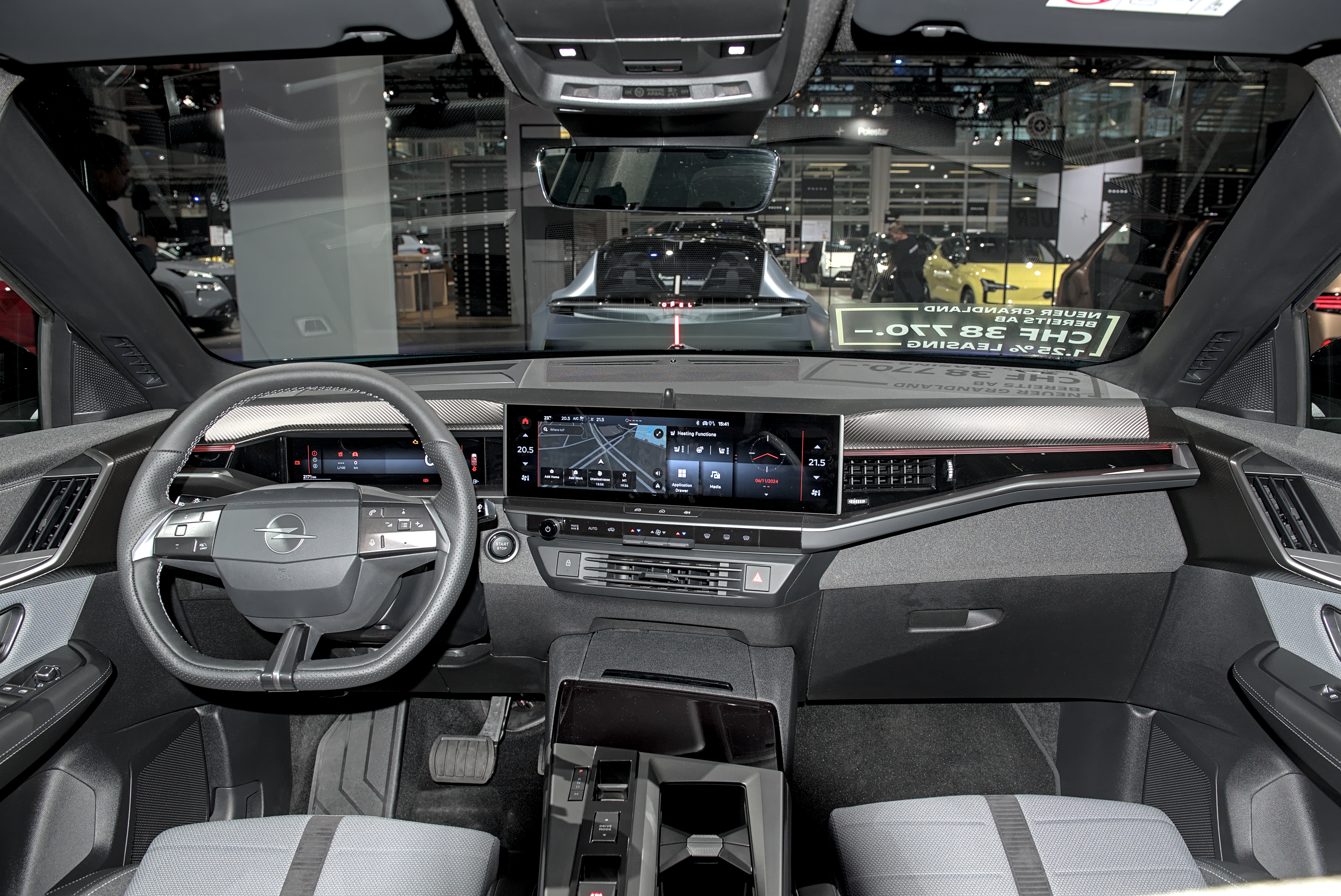
Interior

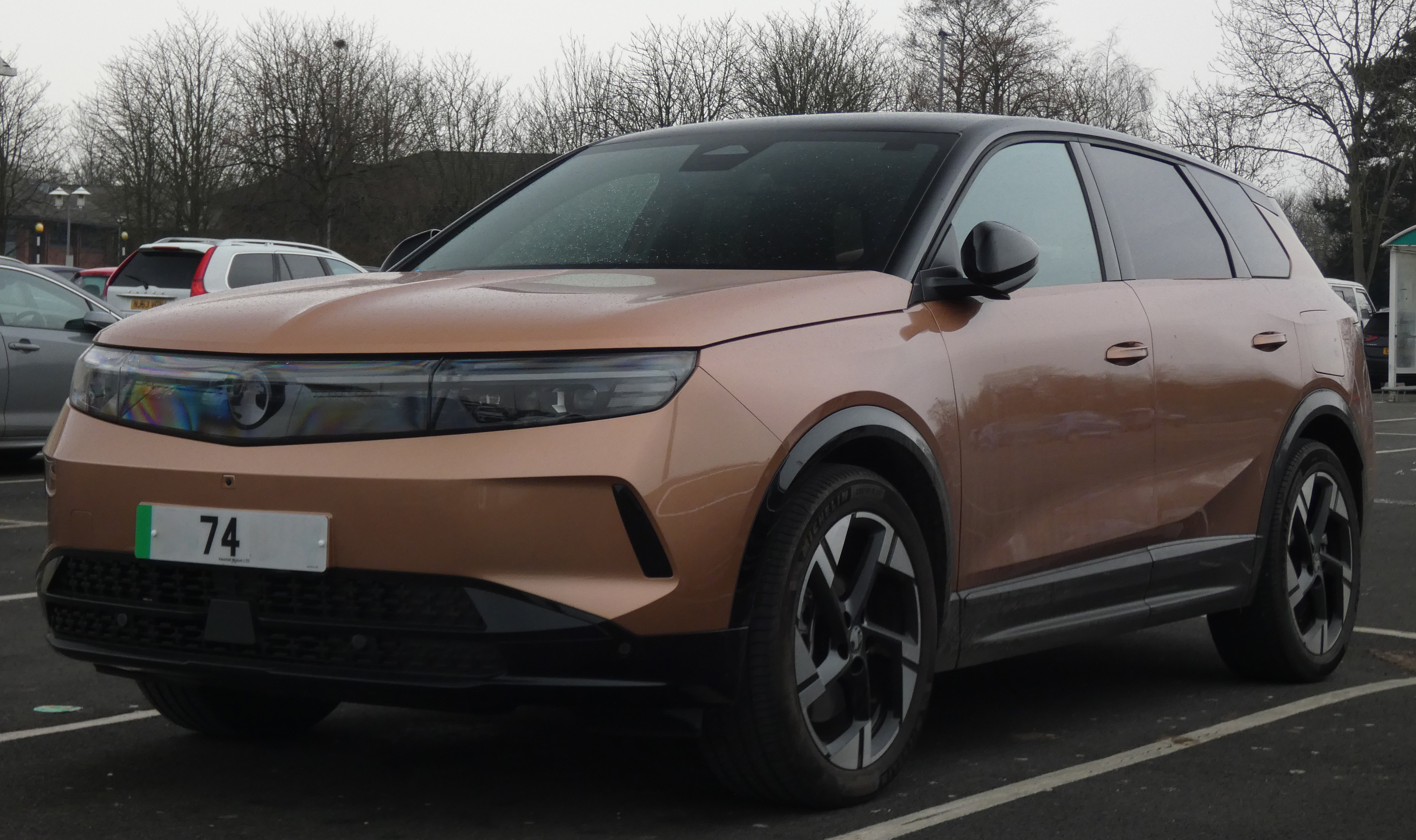
Vauxhall Grandland GS front view

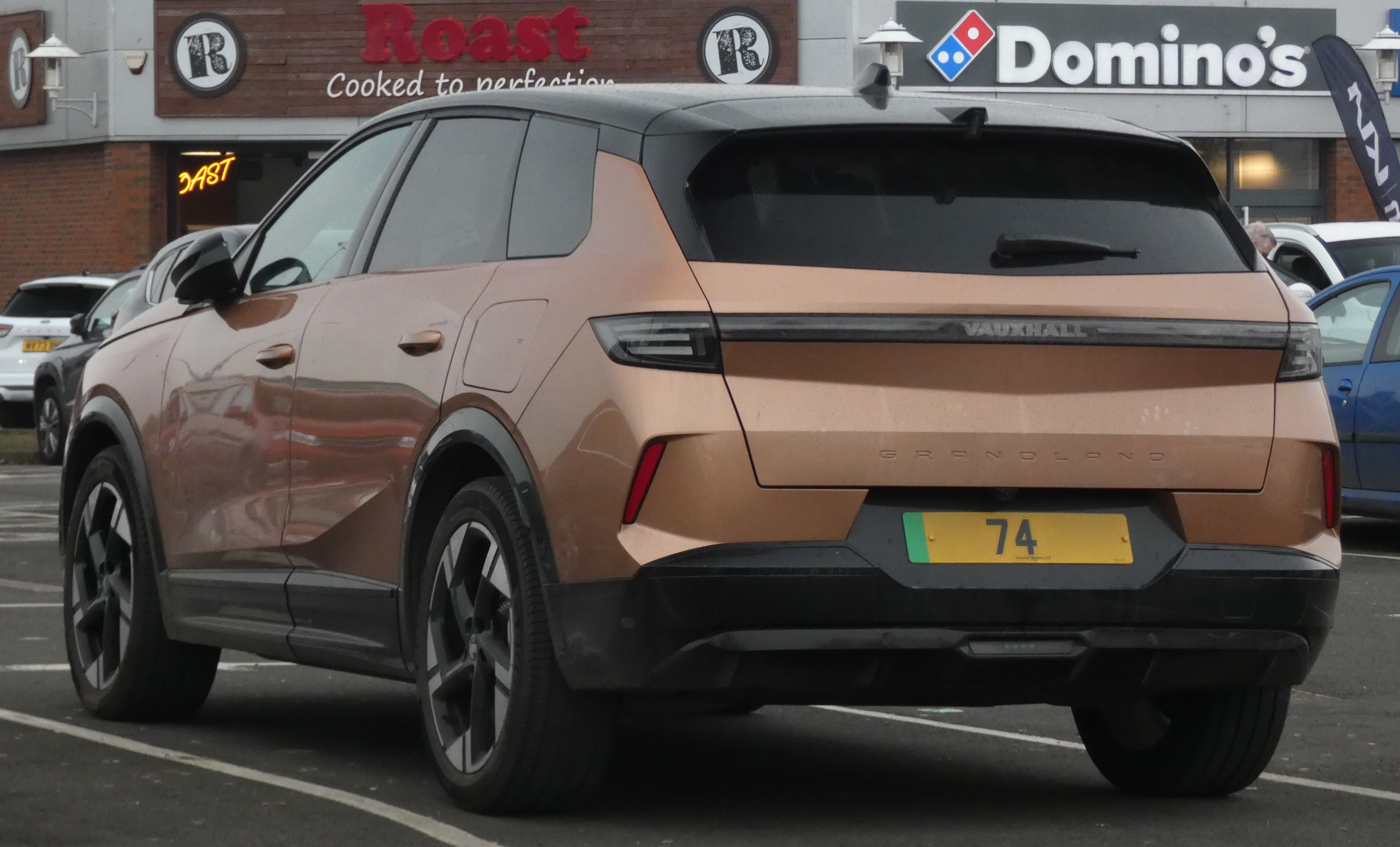
Vauxhall Grandland GS rear view

=== Powertrains ===
Model	Type	Battery	Displacement	Power	Torque	Combined system output (PS; Nm)	0–100 km/h (0–62 mph)	Top speed	Trans.	Layout
Mild hybrid engines
1.2 Turbo Mild Hybrid	1.2 L PSA EB2DTS Turbo I3	0.43 kWh Li-NMC battery	1,199 cc (1.2 L; 73.2 cu in)	136 PS (134 hp; 100 kW) @ 5,500 rpm Motor: 28 PS (28 hp; 21 kW)	230 N⋅m (170 lb⋅ft) @ 1,750 rpm Motor: 55 N⋅m (41 lb⋅ft)	-	10.2 s	202 km/h (126 mph)	6-speed dual-clutch transmission (e-DCT)	FWD
Plug-in hybrid engines
1.6 Turbo Plug-In Hybrid	1.6 L PSA EP6FADTXD Turbo I4	17.9 kWh Li-NMC battery	1,598 cc (1.6 L; 97.5 cu in)	150 PS (148 hp; 110 kW) @ 5,500 rpm Motor: 125 PS (123 hp; 92 kW)	300 N⋅m (220 lb⋅ft) @ 2,000 rpm Motor: 300 N⋅m (220 lb⋅ft)	195 PS (192 hp; 143 kW) + 350 N⋅m (260 lb⋅ft)	7.8 s	220 km/h (140 mph)	7-speed dual-clutch transmission (e-DCT)	FWD
Electric models
Model	Battery		Transmission	Range (WLTP)	Power		Torque	0–100 km/h (0–62 mph)	Top speed	Drive
73 kWh	73 kWh Lithium-ion NMC (1x)		1-speed direct-drive	365 km (227 mi)	210 hp (213 PS; 157 kW)		260 N⋅m (190 lb⋅ft)	9.0 s	170 km/h (110 mph)	FWD
82 kWh	82.2 kWh Lithium-ion NMC (1x)		1-speed direct-drive	410 km (250 mi)	210 hp (213 PS; 157 kW)		260 N⋅m (190 lb⋅ft)	9.0 s	170 km/h (110 mph)	FWD
73 kWh AWD	73 kWh Lithium-ion NMC		1-speed direct-drive	501 km (311 mi)	321 hp (239 kW; 325 PS)		508 N⋅m (375 lb⋅ft)	6.1 s	170 km/h (110 mph)	AWD

=== Safety ===
The second-generation Grandland shares its Euro NCAP results with the Peugeot 3008 and 5008.

Euro NCAP test results Peugeot e-3008 73kWh (LHD) (2025)
Test	Points	%
Overall:	4 /5 stars	
Adult occupant:	33.1	82%
Child occupant:	42	85%
Pedestrian:	50.2	79%
Safety assist:	11.3	62%

== Sales ==
Year	Europe (Note: Europe: 2020 EU 27 + UK + Switzerland + Norway + Iceland)	Turkey	Egypt
2017	8,971		
2018	77,859		
2019	91,575		
2020	71,680	6,499	
2021	50,222		
2022	38,160		
2023			
2024		9,410	626
2025		9,258	1,876
