= Peugeot 5008 =

Series of automobiles

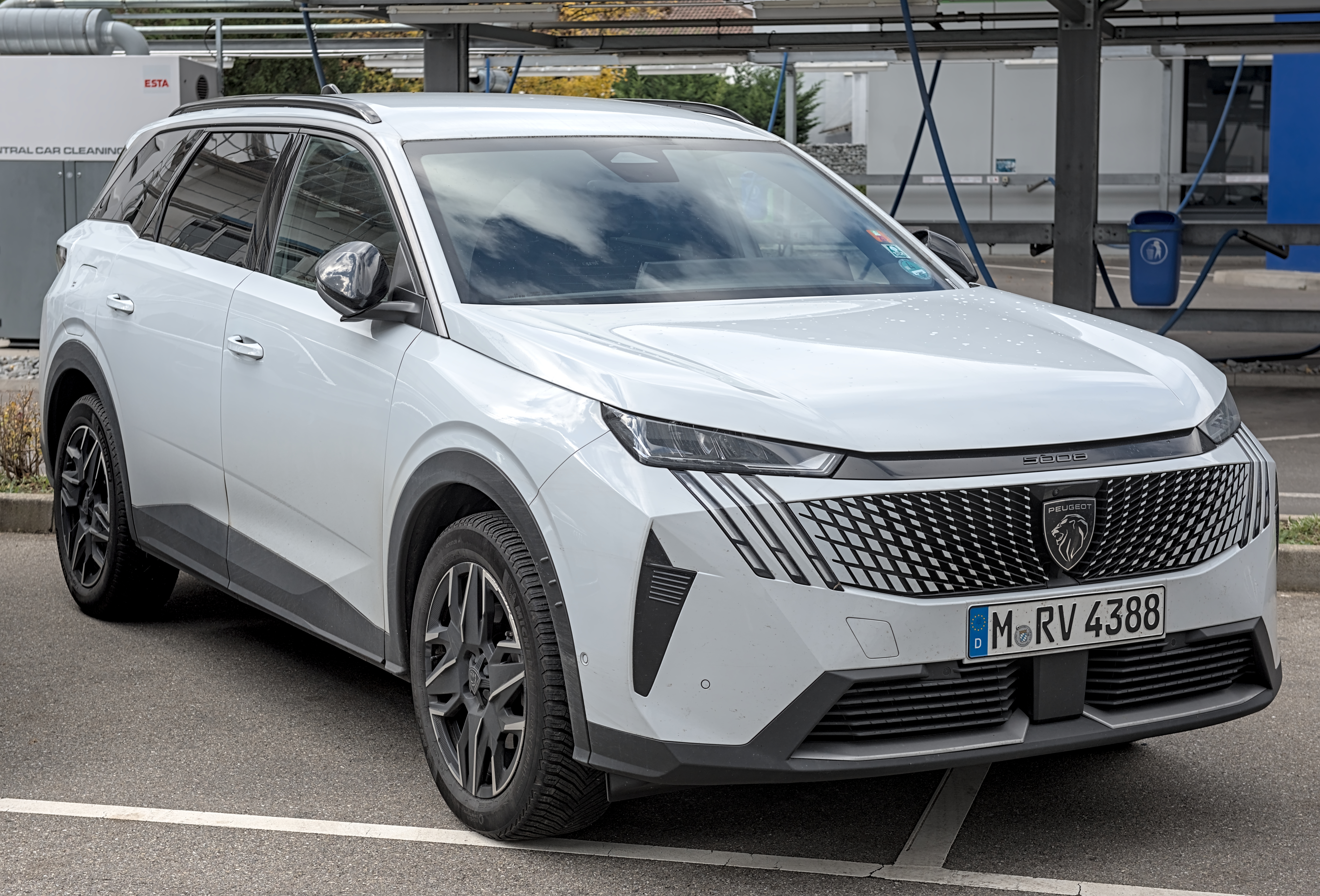

Overview
- Manufacturer: Peugeot (Note: PSA Group (2009–2021); Stellantis (2021–present))
- Production: 2009–present

Body and chassis
- Class: Compact MPV (2009–2016); Mid-size SUV (2017–present)
- Body style: 5-door MPV (2009–2016); 5-door crossover SUV (2017–present)
- Related: Peugeot 3008

Chronology
- Predecessor: Peugeot 807

The Peugeot 5008 is a series of automobiles produced by the French manufacturer Peugeot since 2009. Originally a compact MPV in classification, since 2017, it was reclassified as a mid-size SUV. Five- and seven-seat versions have been available and its engine range is the same as that used in the Peugeot 3008.

== First generation (T87; 2009) ==
First generation
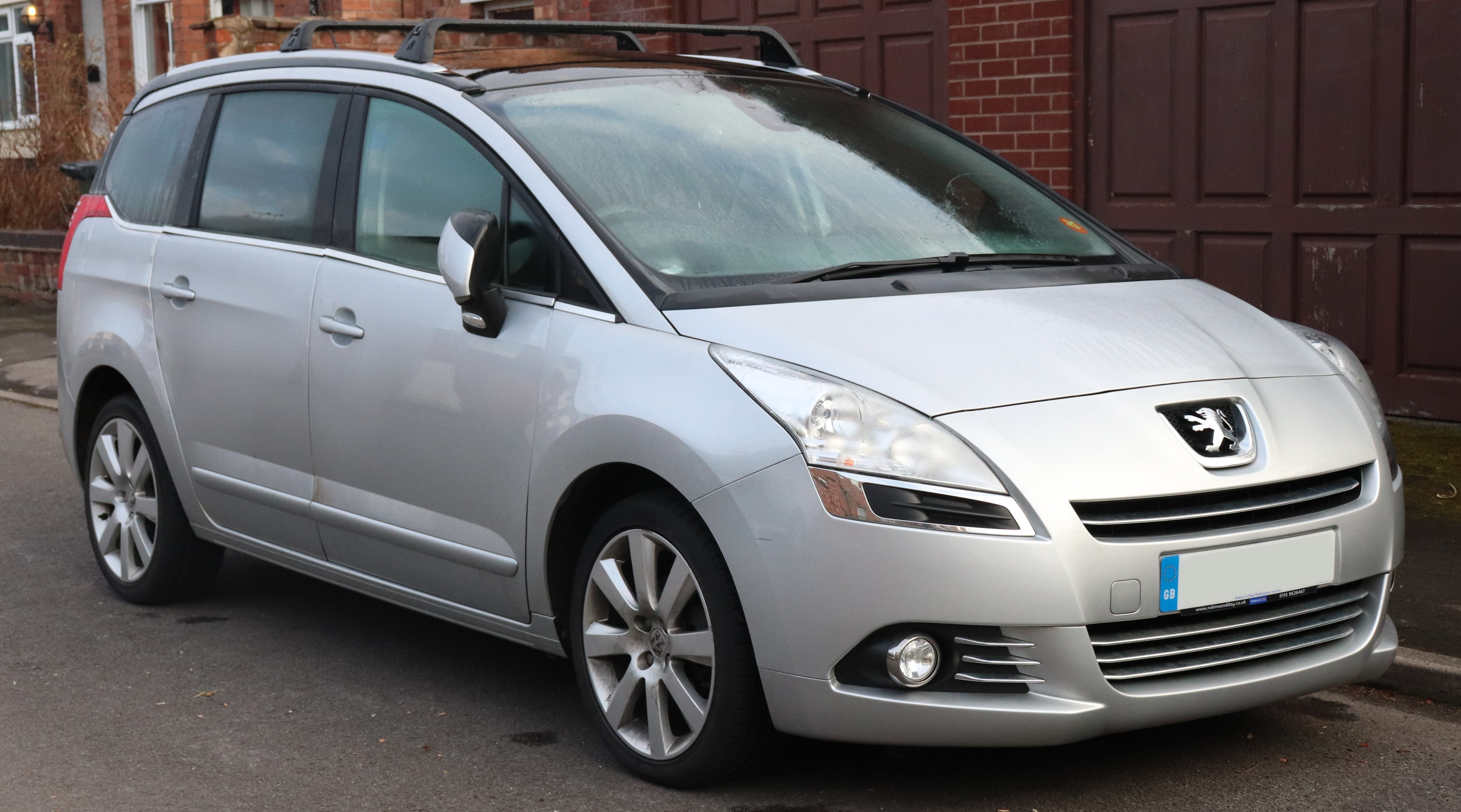

Overview
- Model code: T87
- Production: 2009–2016
- Assembly: France: Sochaux (PSA Sochaux Plant); Malaysia: Gurun (NAM)

Body and chassis
- Body style: 5-door MPV
- Layout: Front-engine, front-wheel-drive
- Platform: PSA PF2
- Related: Peugeot 3008 I Citroën C4; Citroën C4 Picasso

Powertrain
- Engine: Petrol: 1.2 L EB2 Puretech I3 turbo 1.6 L PSA EP6 VTi I4; 1.6 L THP156 I4 turbo Diesel: 1.6 L DV6 HDi I4; 2.0 L DW10 HDi I4; 2.0 L DW10 HDi I4 with electric engine (HYbrid4)
- Transmission: 5-speed manual 6-speed manual 6-speed automatic 6-speed automated manual

Dimensions
- Wheelbase: 2,735 mm (107.7 in)
- Length: 4,530 mm (178.3 in)
- Width: 1,835 mm (72.2 in)
- Height: 1,640 mm (64.6 in)

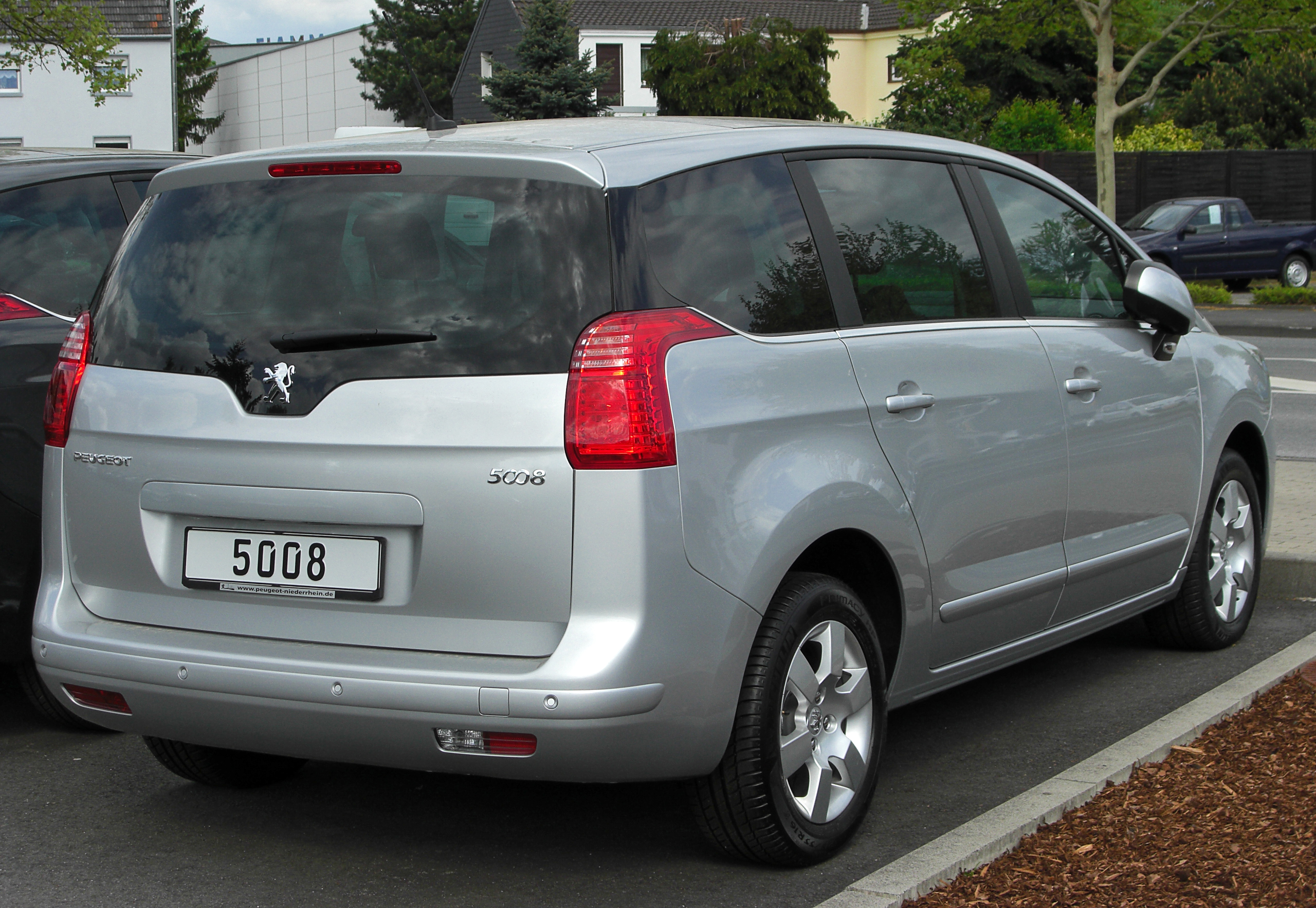
Peugeot 5008 (Europe)

The first generation was unveiled in July 2009, and officially went on sale in November 2009. The 5008's introduction coincided with the promotion of Peugeot design director Gilles Vidal, whose influence was already beginning to show itself in the firm's models, promising a renaissance in styling direction.

The 5008 shares core structure and mechanical components with the first generation Peugeot 3008. The 5008 was awarded 2010 MPV of the Year by What Car? magazine. Owing to its spacious interior and futuristic design, the 5008 has been developed a loyal fan base who colloquially refer to the car as the 'Space Wagon'.

=== Facelift ===
The first generation received a facelift in October 2013. The facelift has also brought a refreshed engine line-up that includes the PureTech three-cylinder petrol, and the newer BlueHDi diesel options.

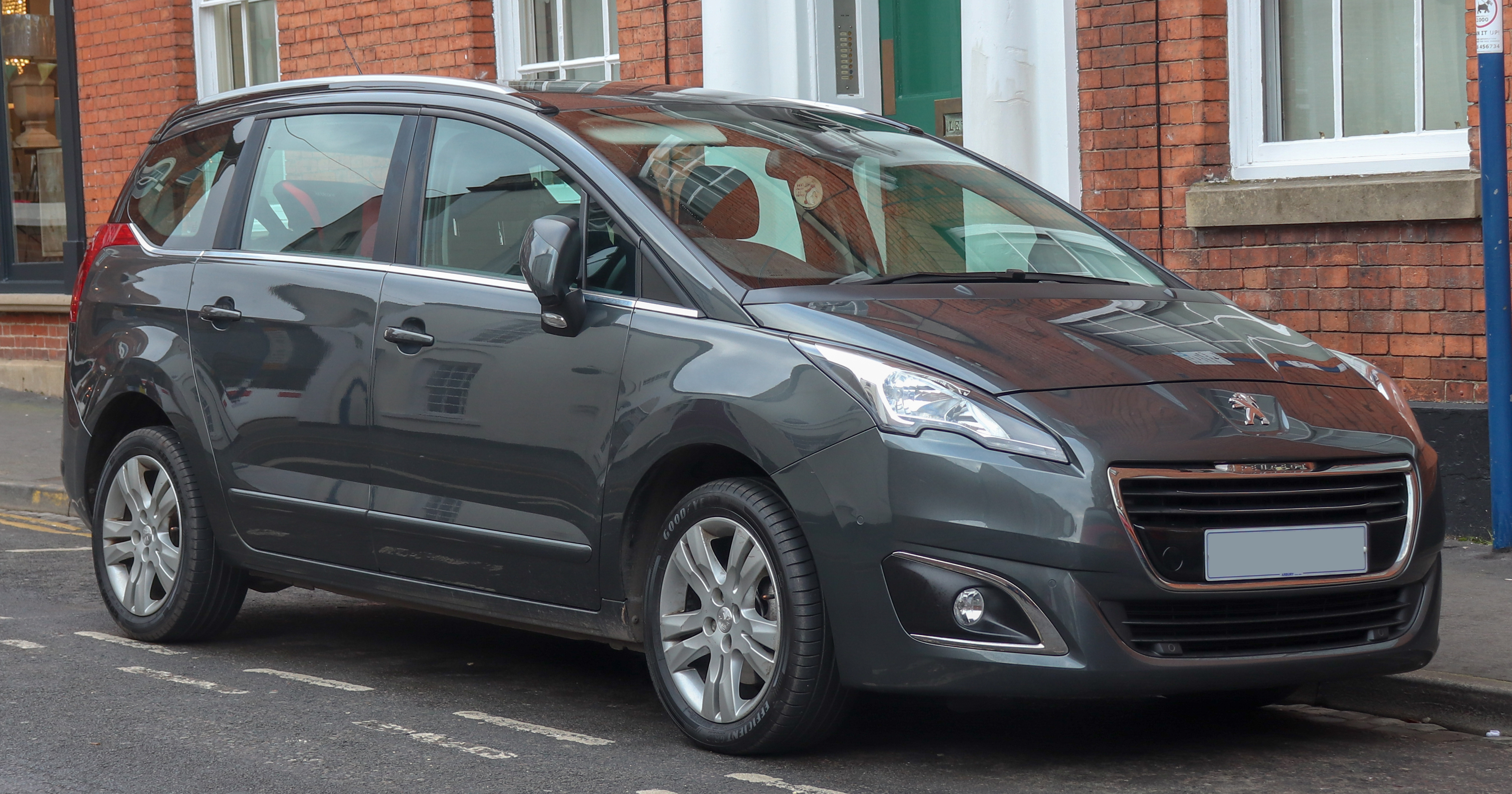
Front view (facelift)

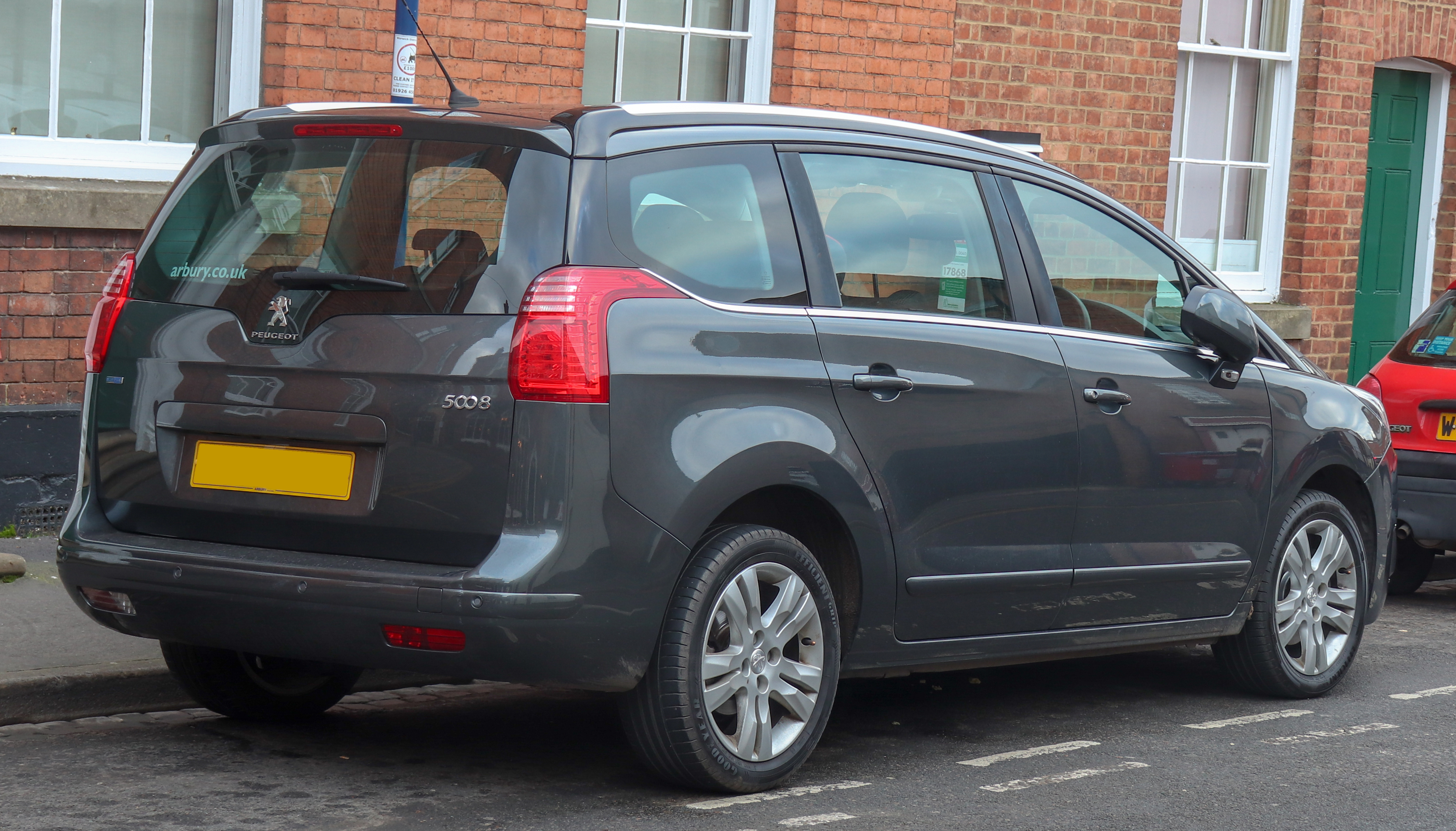
Rear view (facelift)

=== Engines ===
Petrol engine
Model	Engine	Displacement	Power	Torque	0–100 km/h (0–62 mph) (s)	Top speed	Transmission	CO_{2} emission (g/km)
1.2 Puretech 2014–2016	I3	1200 cc	120 PS (88 kW; 118 hp) at 6,000 rpm	160 N⋅m (118 lb⋅ft) at 4,250 rpm	11.8	115 mph (185 km/h)	5 speed manual	118
1.6 VTi 2009–2016	I4	1598 cc	120 PS (88 kW; 118 hp) at 6,000 rpm	160 N⋅m (118 lb⋅ft) at 4,250 rpm	11.8	115 mph (185 km/h)	5 speed manual	169
1.6 THP156 2009–2016	I4	1598 cc	156 PS (115 kW; 154 hp) at 5,800 rpm	240 N⋅m (177 lb⋅ft) at 1,400 rpm	9.7	121 mph (195 km/h)	6 speed manual	167
Diesel engine
Model	Engine	Displacement	Power	Torque	0–100 km/h (0–62 mph) (s)	Top speed	Note	CO_{2} emission (g/km)
HDi 110 2009–2016	I4	1560 cc	110 PS (81 kW; 108 hp) at 4,000 rpm	240 N⋅m (177 lb⋅ft) at 1,750 rpm	12.9	114 mph (183 km/h)	6 speed automated manual	140
HDi 110 2009–2016	I4	1560 cc	110 PS (81 kW; 108 hp) at 4,000 rpm	240 N⋅m (177 lb⋅ft) at 1,750 rpm	12.9	114 mph (183 km/h)	6 speed manual	140
HDi 150 2009–2016	I4	1997 cc	150 PS (110 kW; 148 hp) at 3,750 rpm	340 N⋅m (251 lb⋅ft) at 2,000 rpm	10.0	121 mph (195 km/h)	6 speed manual	151
HDi 163 2009–2016	I4	1997 cc	163 PS (120 kW; 161 hp) at 3,750 rpm	340 N⋅m (251 lb⋅ft) at 2,000 rpm	10.5	118 mph (190 km/h)	6 speed automatic	178

=== Safety ===
ANCAP test results Peugeot 5008 all variants (2013)
Test	Score
Overall	5 /5 stars
Frontal offset	15.41/16
Side impact	16/16
Pole	2/2
Seat belt reminders	3/3
Whiplash protection	Good
Pedestrian protection	Marginal
Electronic stability control	Standard

Euro NCAP test results 5 door LHD MPV (2009)
Test	Points	%
Overall:	5 /5 stars	
Adult occupant:	32	89%
Child occupant:	39	79%
Pedestrian:	13	37%
Safety assist:	7	97%

== Second generation (P87; 2017) ==
Second generation
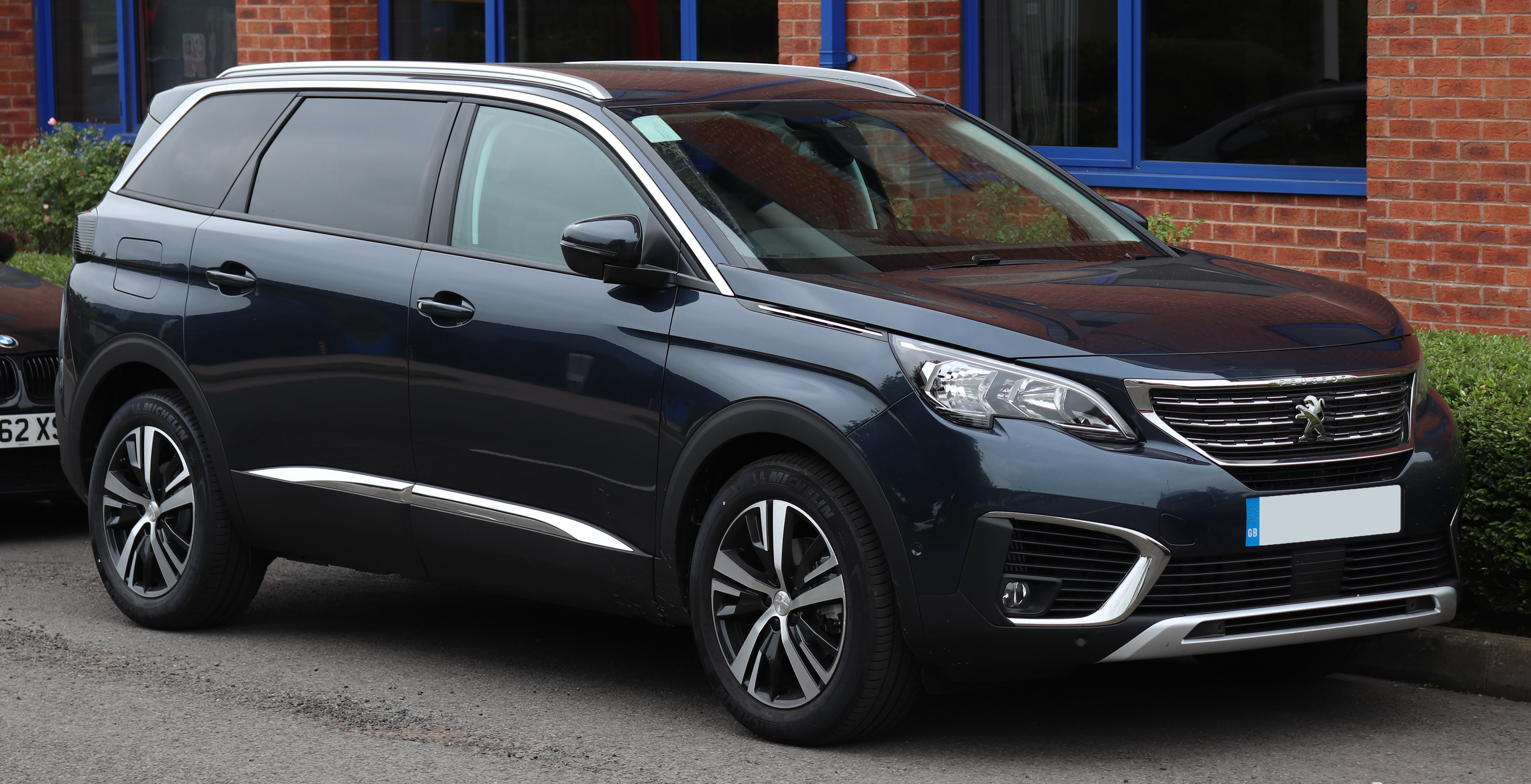
- 2018 Peugeot 5008 Allure (pre-facelift)

Overview
- Model code: P87
- Production: 2017–2024; 2017–present (China)
- Assembly: France: Rennes (Rennes Plant); Sochaux (Sochaux Plant); China: Chengdu (DPCA); Malaysia: Gurun (Gurun Plant); Namibia: Walvis Bay (Peugeot Opel Assembly Namibia (POAN); Vietnam: Chu Lai (THACO); Nigeria: Kaduna (PAN/DPAN)
- Designer: Sandeep Bhambra

Body and chassis
- Body style: 5-door crossover SUV
- Layout: Front-engine, front-wheel-drive
- Platform: PSA EMP2 platform
- Related: Peugeot 508 II; Peugeot 3008 II; Citroën C5 Aircross; Opel Grandland

Powertrain
- Engine: Petrol: 1.2 L EB2DTS I3 turbo; 1.6 L EP6FDT I4 turbo; Diesel: 1.5 L DV5 BlueHDi I4 turbo; 2.0 L DW10 I4 turbo
- Transmission: 5-speed manual 6-speed manual 6-speed automatic 8-speed automatic

Dimensions
- Wheelbase: 2,840 mm (111.8 in)
- Length: 4,641 mm (182.7 in)
- Width: 1,844 mm (72.6 in)
- Height: 1,646 mm (64.8 in)

The second generation is an SUV, unveiled to the press on 7 September 2016, before a presentation to the public scheduled for the 2016 Paris Motor Show. It is essentially a seven-seater version of the Peugeot 3008, which was to be released in the spring of 2017. Its wheelbase is 165 mm longer, and about 50 kg heavier than the 3008.

The 5008 is assembled in France at the PSA plant in Rennes. Assembly in China takes place at the Dongfeng PSA Plant in Chengdu, together with the 3008 II (called the 4008 in China) and the Citroën C5 Aircross. In China, these three models all share the same platform, engines and transmission.

=== Design ===
Unlike the previous generation that was a pure MPV, the 5008 is an SUV to follow the trend in sales. It is actually an extended version of the 3008, presented several months previously. Specific elements include a different front grille and front bumper, and a chrome arch running through the entire pavilion to the bottom of the rear window.

The interior of the 5008 shares the similar iCockpit design from the smaller 3008. In particular, the 8-inch captive touchscreen, but also a 12.3-inch high resolution digital head up panel, is available.

On the other hand, the wheelbase extended to 2.84 m makes it possible to significantly increase the capacity; seven seats became available, divided into three rows. In the first row, the passenger seat can be shelved to load the long objects. The second row is composed of three independent seats, retractable and adjustable in length and inclination. Finally, the third row consists of two additional seats which can be folded or unfolded individually.

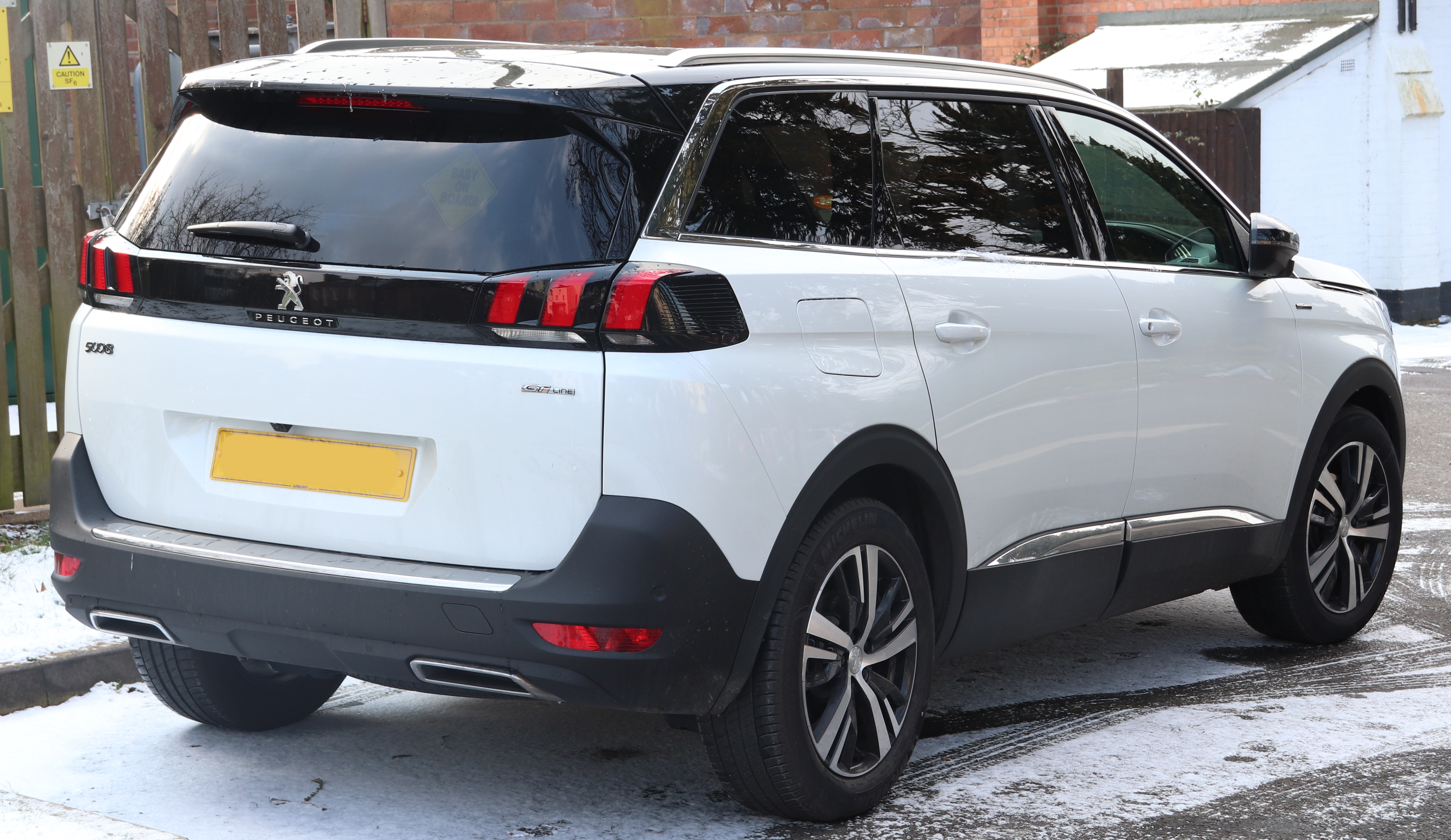
Rear view (GT Line)

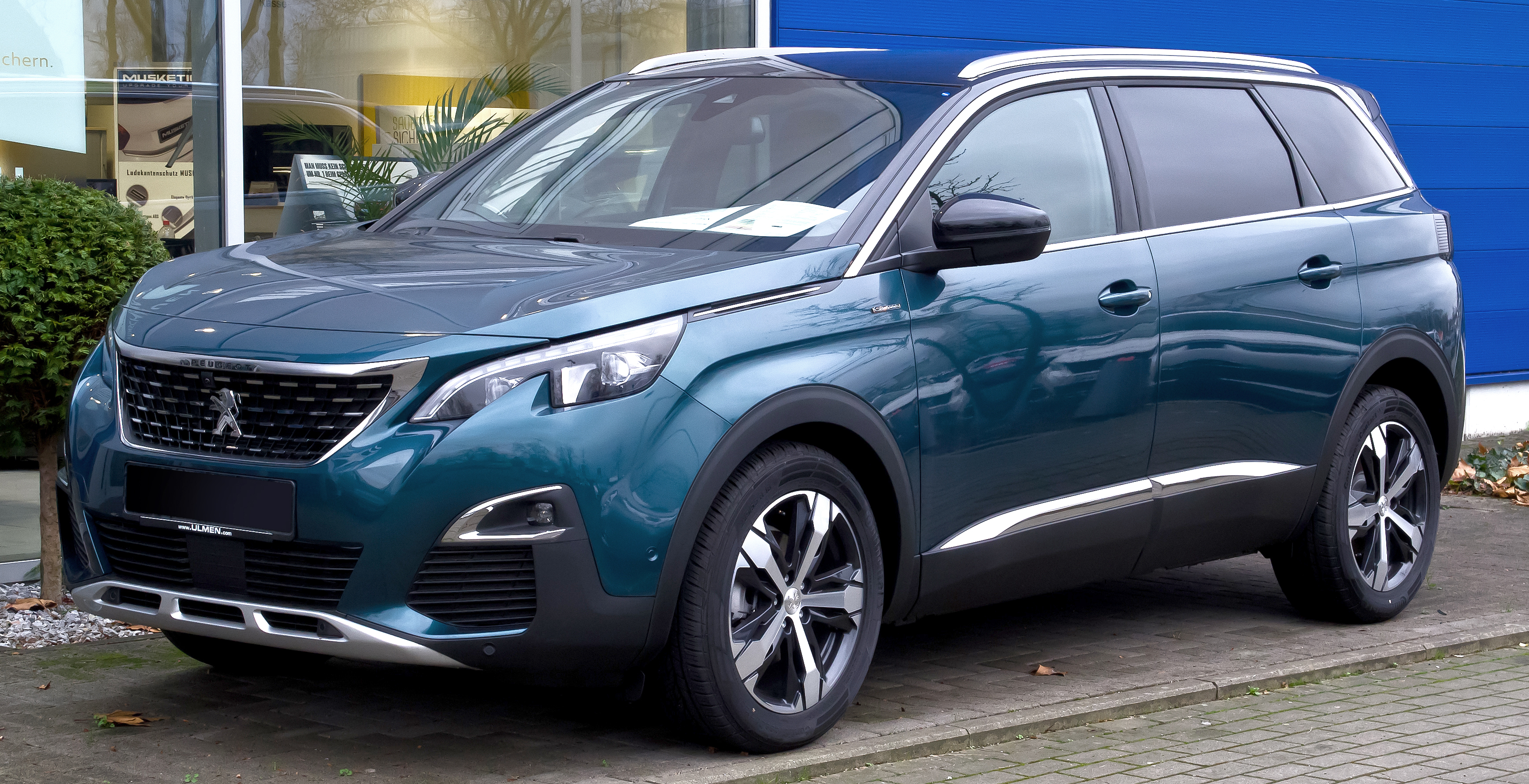
Front view (GT Line)

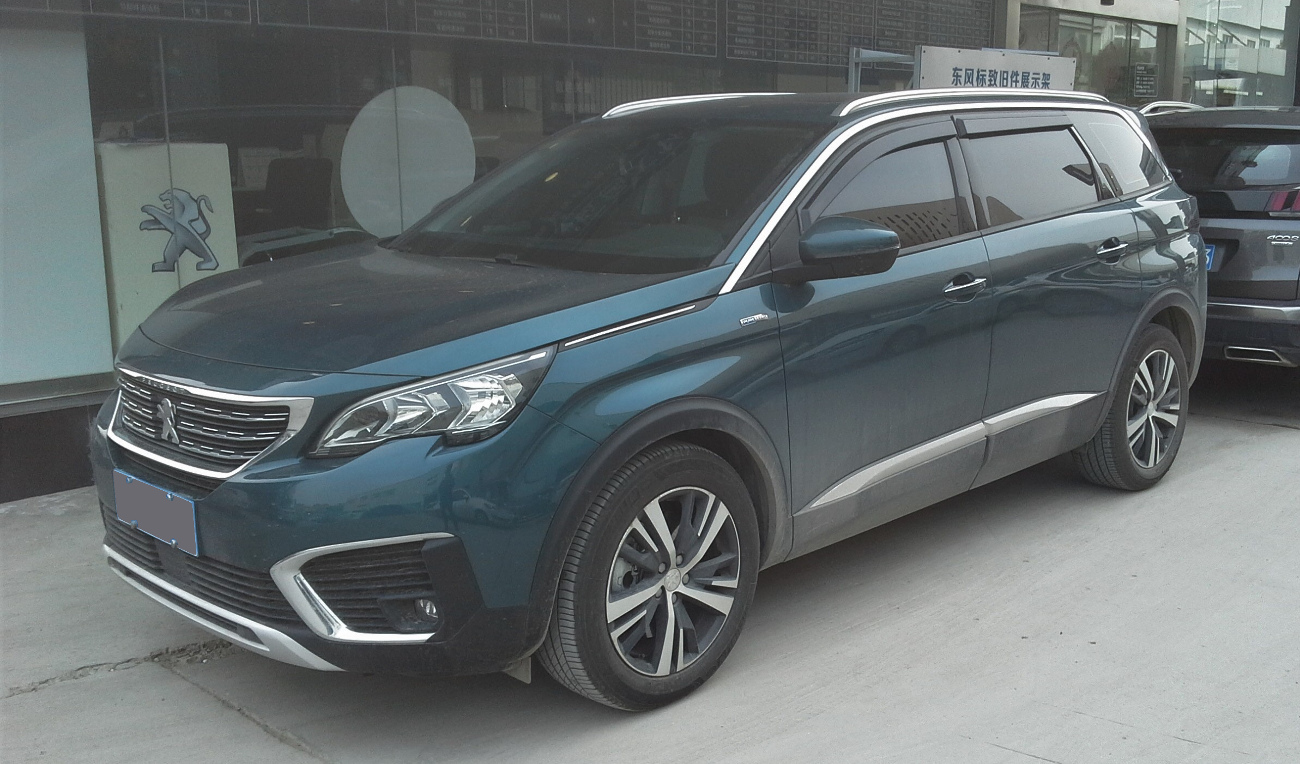
Peugeot 5008 (China)

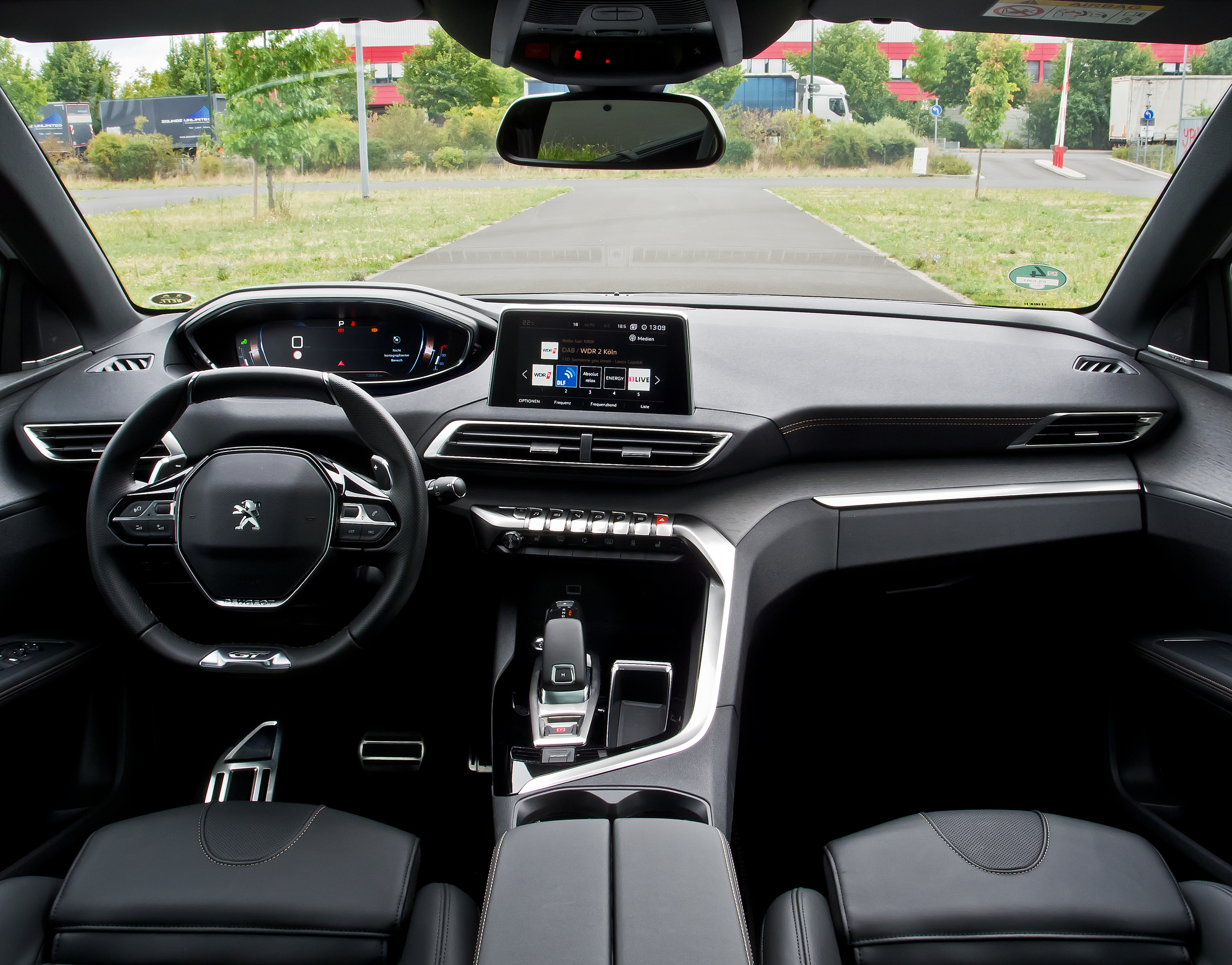
Interior

=== Facelift ===
The facelift for the second-generation Peugeot 5008 was revealed in September 2020. It emphasises Peugeot's new design language that can be seen on the 3008 and 308 including, new headlights and taillights, new bumper, new colour options, new models, and newer technology.

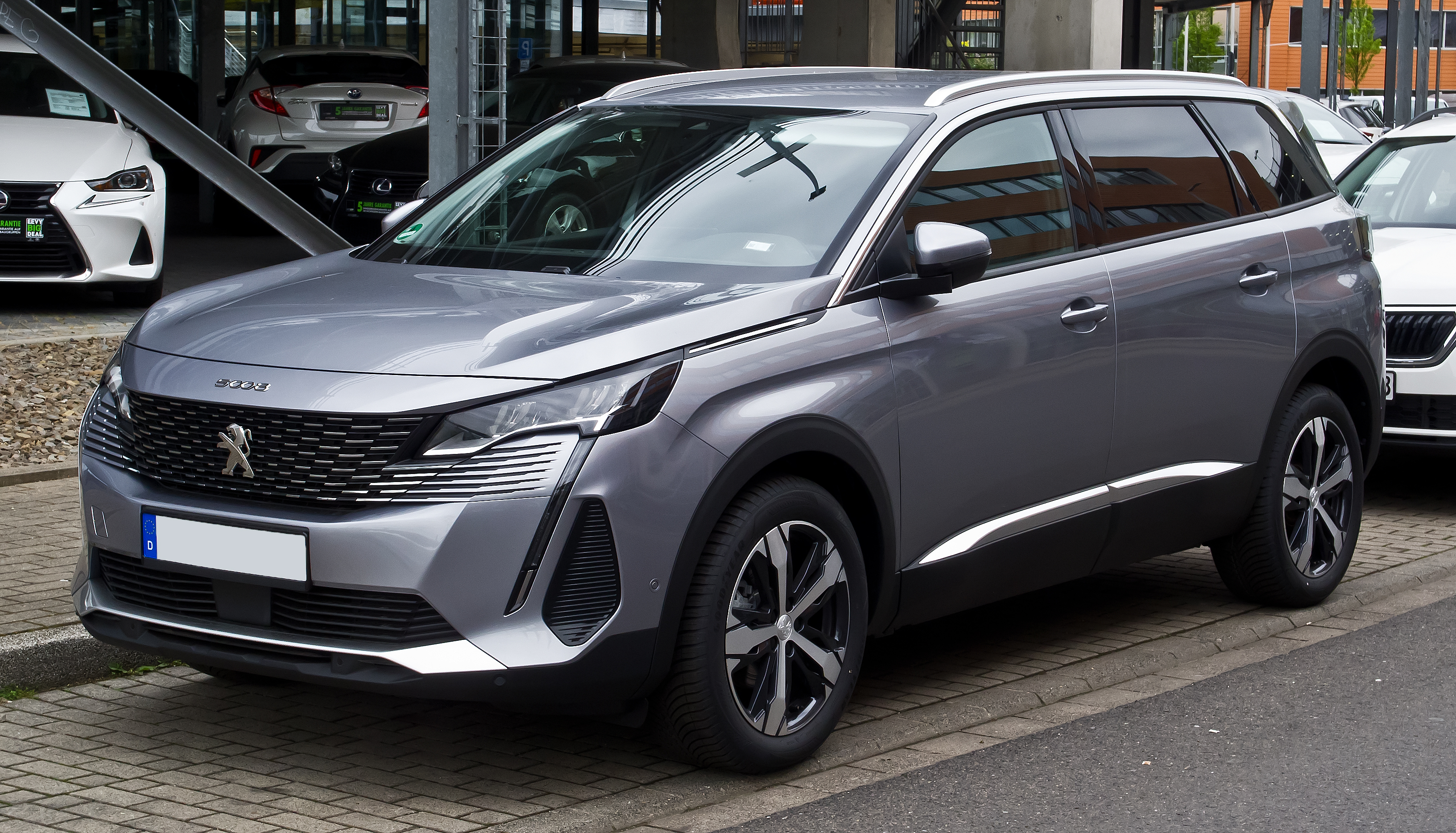
2020 facelift

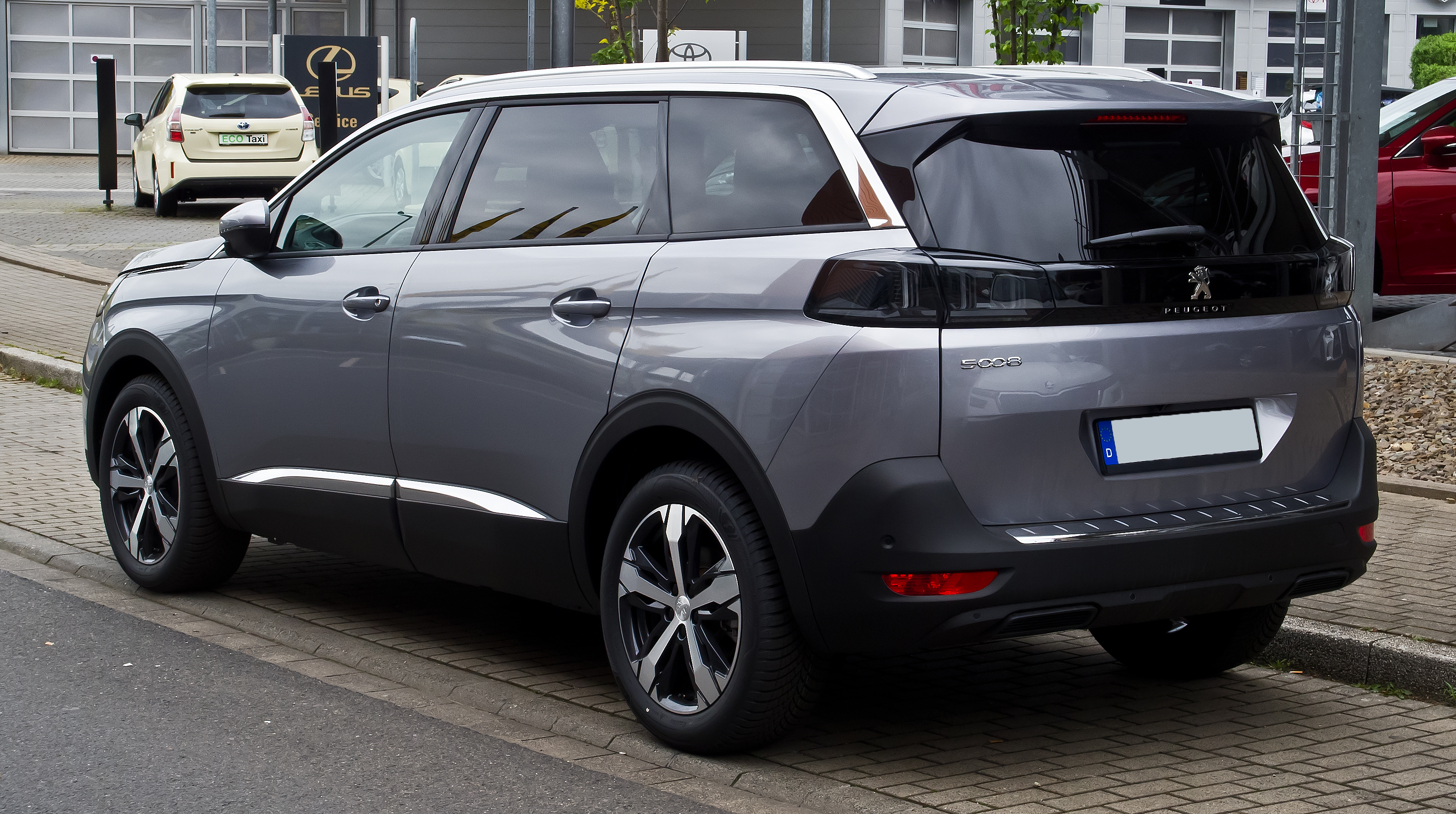
2020 facelift

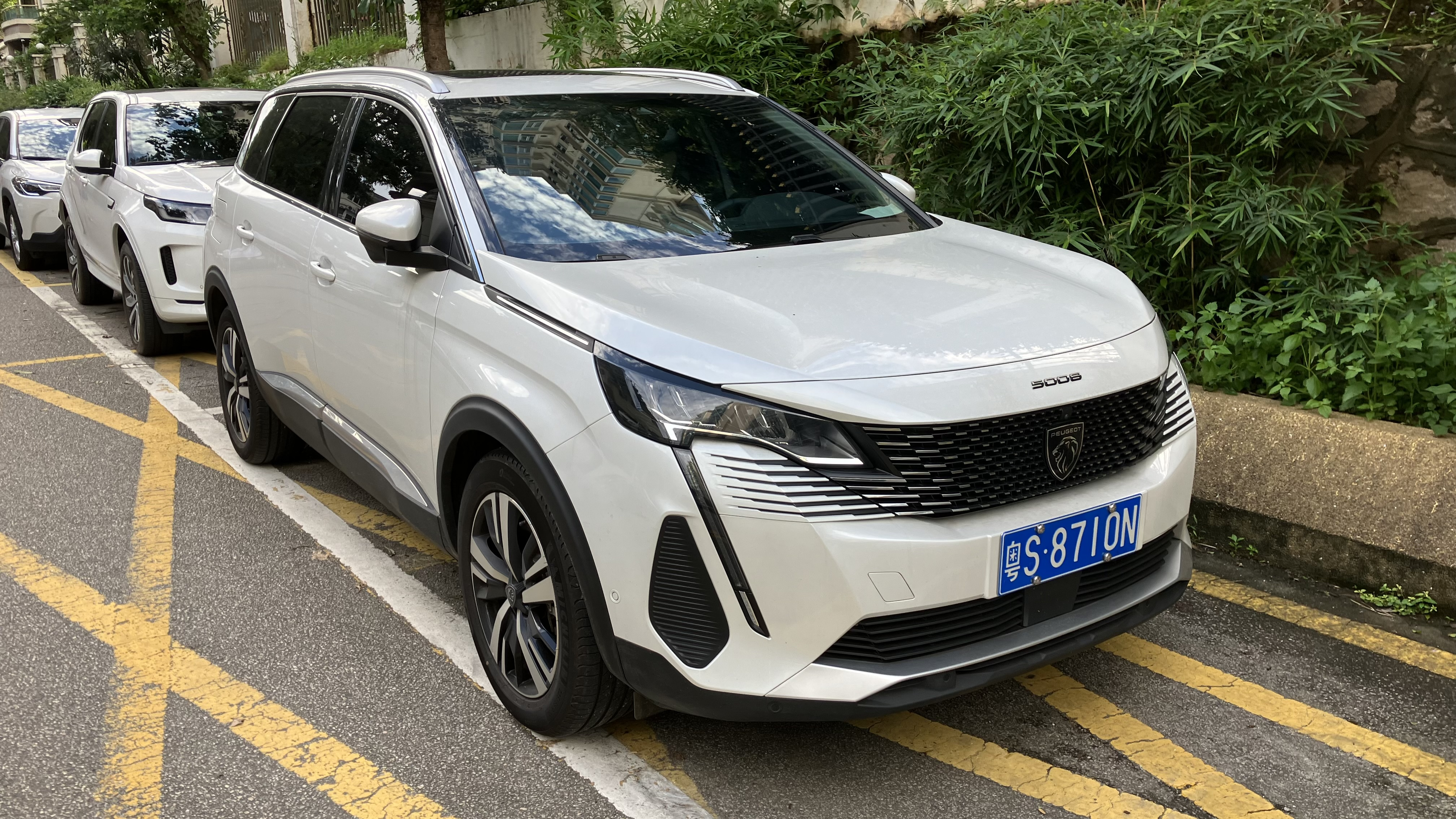
China facelift

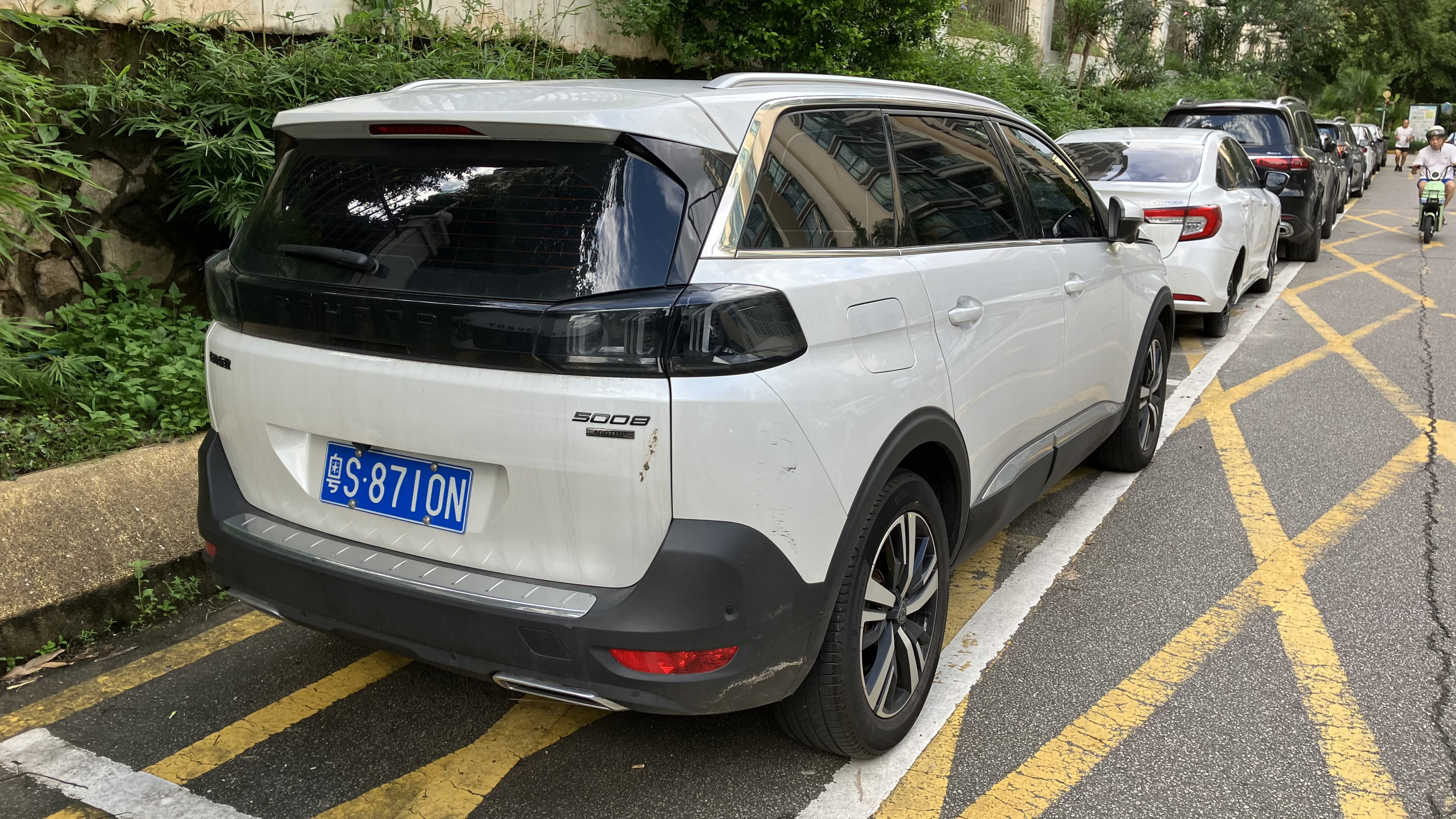
China facelift

==== Hybrid ====
In February 2023, Peugeot launched the 5008 Hybrid, with the mild hybrid technology reducing fuel consumption by up to 15% compared to the petrol equivalent.

=== Safety ===
ANCAP test results Peugeot 5008 all variants (2016, aligned with Euro NCAP)
Test	Points	%
Overall:	5 /5 stars	
Adult occupant:	32.8	86%
Child occupant:	41.9	85%
Pedestrian:	28.2	67%
Safety assist:	6	58%

== Third generation (P67; 2024) ==
Third generation
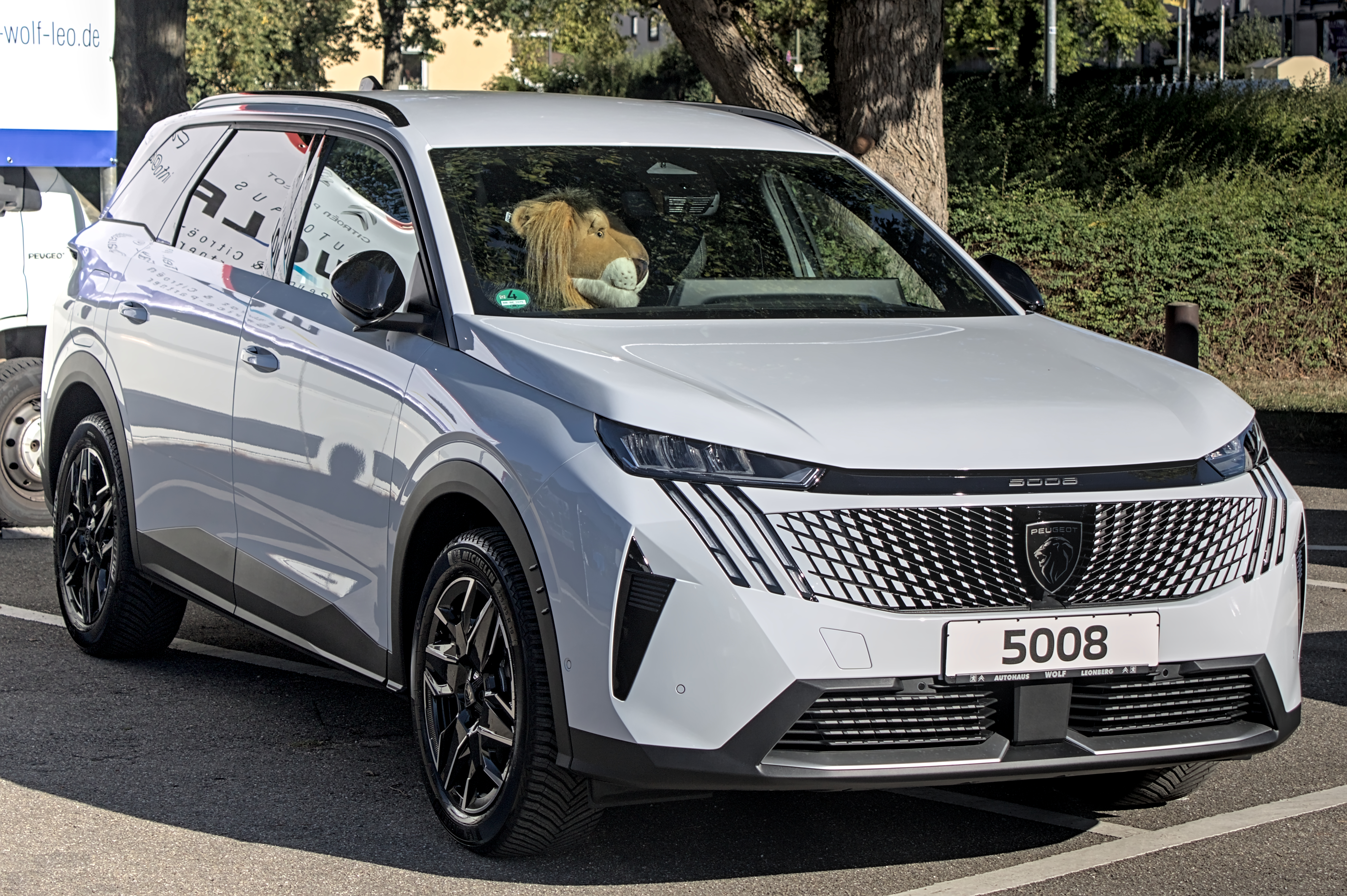
- 2024 Peugeot 5008 Hybrid

Overview
- Model code: P67
- Also called: Peugeot e-5008 (electric version)
- Production: 2024–present
- Assembly: France: Sochaux (PSA Sochaux Plant)

Body and chassis
- Body style: 5-door crossover SUV
- Layout: Front-engine, front-wheel-drive; Front-motor, front-wheel drive; Dual-motor, all-wheel drive
- Platform: STLA Medium
- Related: Peugeot 3008 III; Opel Grandland II

Powertrain
- Engine: Petrol: 1.2 L PSA EB2LTEDH2 Turbo I3; 1.6 L PSA EP6FADTXD Turbo I4
- Electric motor: 1 or 2 Permanent magnet AC synchronous motor
- Transmission: 6-speed DCT; 7-speed automatic; 1-speed direct-drive fixed gear ratio (e-5008)
- Hybrid drivetrain: Mild hybrid (MHEV); Plug-in hybrid (PHEV)
- Battery: Lithium-ion NMC: 0.43 kWh (Hybrid 136); 17.9 kWh (Plug-in Hybrid 195); 73–98 kWh (e-5008)
- Electric range: 82 km (51 mi) (PHEV); 360–485 km (224–301 mi) (e-5008)

Dimensions
- Wheelbase: 2,901 mm (114.2 in)
- Length: 4,791 mm (188.6 in)
- Width: 1,895 mm (74.6 in)
- Height: 1,694 mm (66.7 in)
- Curb weight: 1,705–2,218 kg (3,759–4,890 lb)

The third-generation 5008 was introduced on 20 March 2024, with production commencing later that year. The 5008 is essentially the longer version of the 3008 and is based on the STLA Medium platform. The 5008 is produced exclusively at the PSA Sochaux Plant, with the electric motors manufactured and produced by the STELLANTIS-NIDEC joint venture in Trémery, France, and the ACC batteries manufactured at a gigafactory in Douvrin, France.

=== Overview ===
The 5008 design is distinguished by its strong SUV character and retains the boxy shape of its predecessor to maximise interior space, combined with a dynamic silhouette design. It employs a new 'Claw Effect' lighting signature using Peugeot's new Pixel LED lighting technology, a grille that blends into the body colour, and a sloping rear window that is emphasized by sophisticated side design elements. Peugeot created a sustainable design approach by reducing the number of decorative inserts and the chrome parts have been replaced with body coloured elements.

The 5008 interior is similar to the 3008. The dashboard features Peugeot's third generation i-Cockpit design with a 21 in (53 cm) floating screen mounted on top section, the iToggles ten customisable touchscreen buttons in the centre, and a compact steering wheel with buttons that are only activated when the driver presses them.

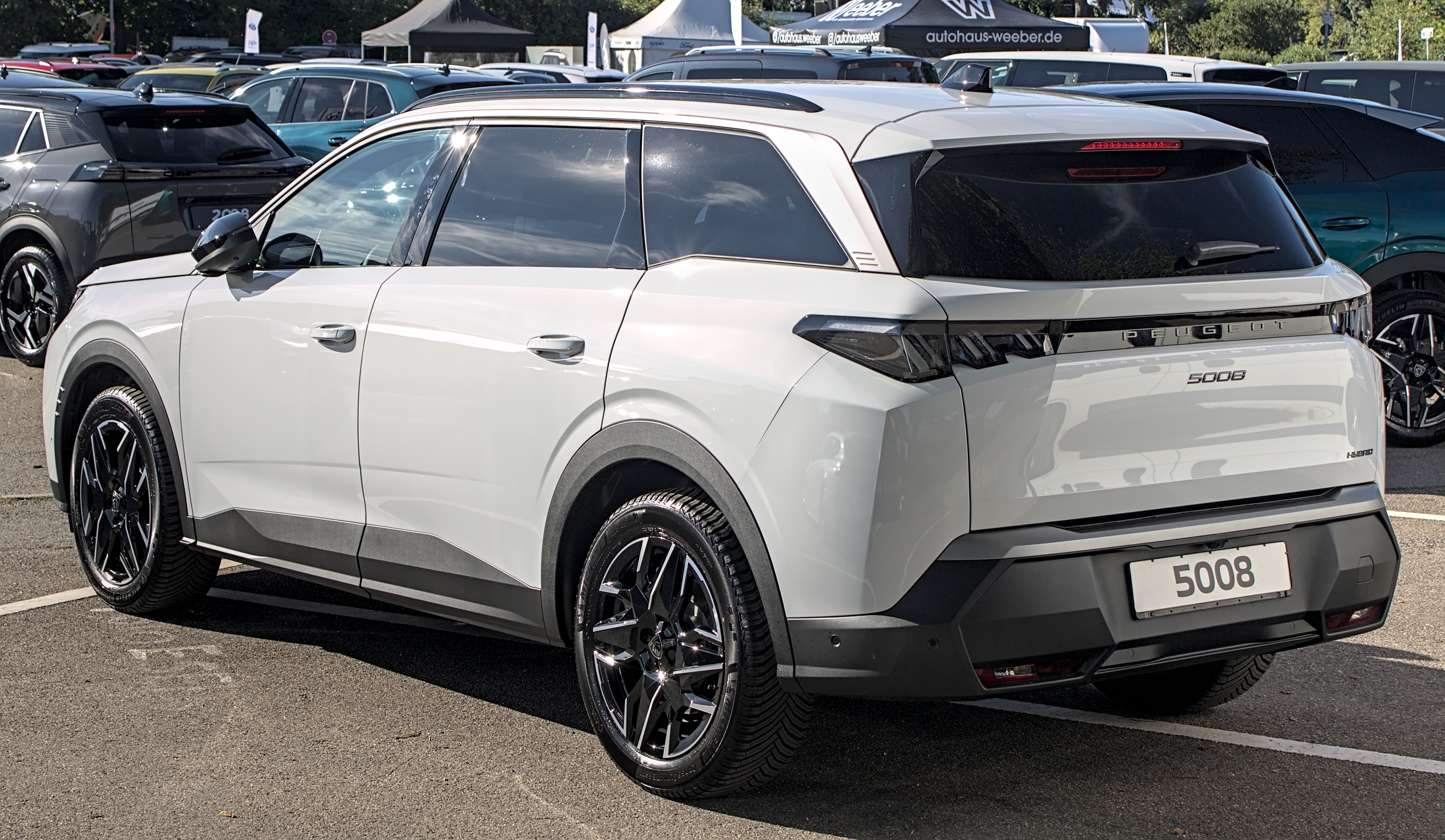
Rear view

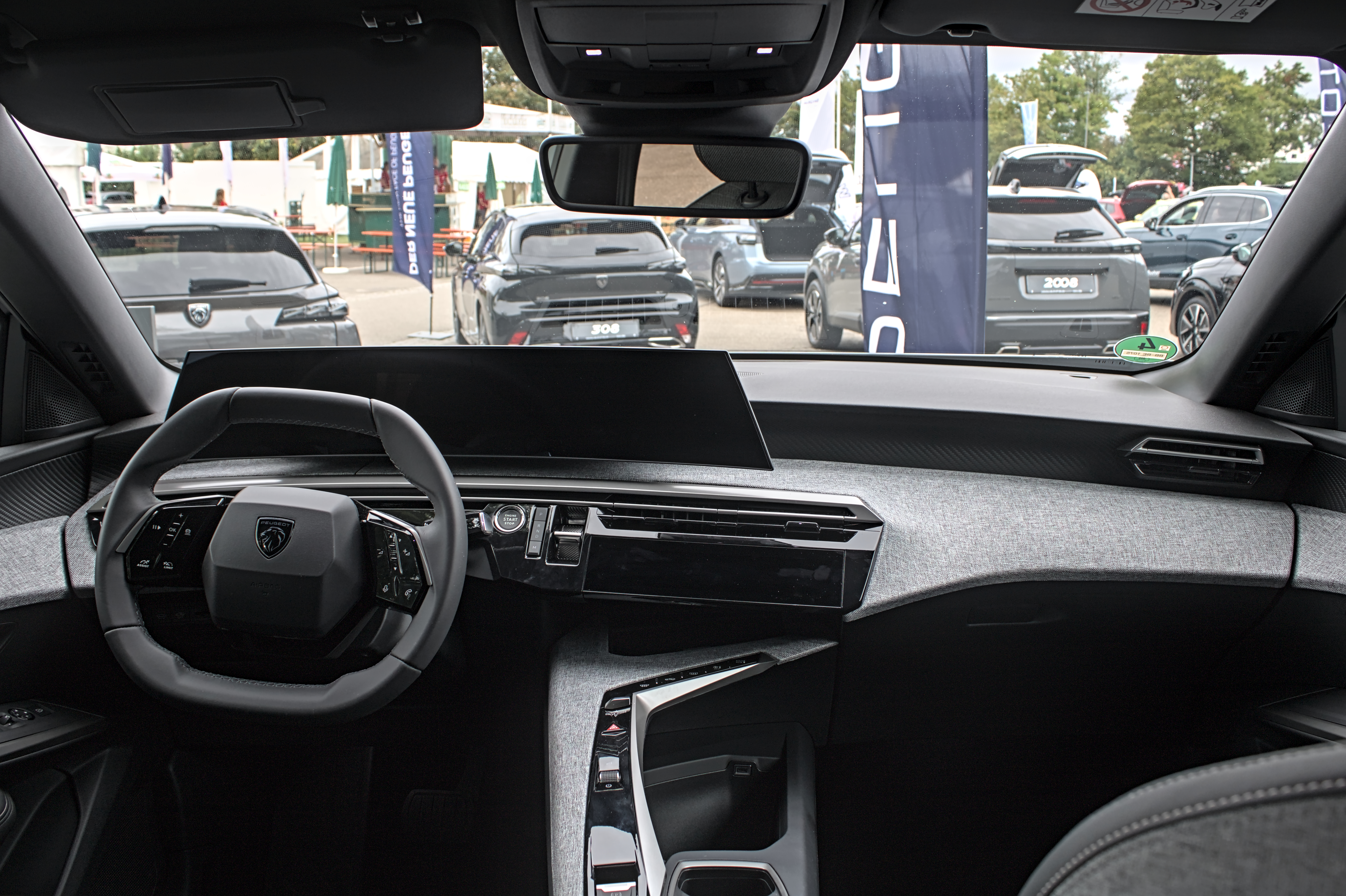
Interior

=== Powertrains ===
Model	Type	Battery	Displacement	Power	Torque	Combined system output	0–100 km/h (0–62 mph)	Top speed	Transmission	Layout
Mild hybrid engines
1.2 Hybrid 145	1.2 L PSA EB2DTS Turbo I3	0.43 kWh Li-NMC battery	1,199 cc (1.2 L; 73.2 cu in)	136 PS (134 hp; 100 kW) @ 5,500 rpm Motor: 21 PS (21 hp; 15 kW)	230 N⋅m (170 lb⋅ft) @ 1,750 rpm Motor: 51 N⋅m (38 lb⋅ft)	145 PS (143 hp; 107 kW)	11.3 s	200 km/h (120 mph)	6-speed dual-clutch transmission (e-DCS6)	FWD
Plug-in hybrid engines
1.6 Plug-In Hybrid 195	1.6 L PSA EP6FADTXD Turbo I4	17.9 kWh Li-NMC battery	1,598 cc (1.6 L; 97.5 cu in)	150 PS (148 hp; 110 kW) @ 6,000 rpm Motor: 125 PS (123 hp; 92 kW)	300 N⋅m (220 lb⋅ft) @ 2,500 rpm Motor: 115 N⋅m (85 lb⋅ft)	196 PS (193 hp; 144 kW)	8.3 s	200 km/h (120 mph)	7-speed dual-clutch transmission (e-DCS7)	FWD
Electric models
Model	Battery		Transmission	Range (Miles)	Power		Torque	0–100 km/h (0–62 mph)	Top speed	Drive
Electric 210	73 kWh Lithium-ion NMC (1x)		1-speed direct-drive	370 km (230 mi)	210 hp (213 PS; 157 kW)		345 N⋅m (254 lb⋅ft)	9.7 s	170 km/h (110 mph)	FWD
Electric 320 Dual Motor	73 kWh Lithium-ion NMC (2x)		1-speed direct-drive	360 km (220 mi)	322 hp (326 PS; 240 kW)		511 N⋅m (377 lb⋅ft)	7.0 s	170 km/h (110 mph)	AWD
Electric 230 Long Range	96.9 kWh Lithium-ion NMC (1x)		1-speed direct-drive	485 km (301 mi)	228 hp (231 PS; 170 kW)		345 N⋅m (254 lb⋅ft)	9.6 s	170 km/h (110 mph)	FWD

=== Safety ===
ANCAP test results Peugeot 5008 all Australian variants (2025, aligned with Euro NCAP)
Test	Points	%
Overall:	5 /5 stars	
Adult occupant:	33.09	82%
Child occupant:	43	87%
Pedestrian:	50.19	79%
Safety assist:	11.72	65%

The third-generation 5008 shares its Euro NCAP results with the Opel Grandland and Peugeot 3008.

Euro NCAP test results Peugeot e-3008 73kWh (LHD) (2025)
Test	Points	%
Overall:	4 /5 stars	
Adult occupant:	33.1	82%
Child occupant:	42	85%
Pedestrian:	50.2	79%
Safety assist:	11.3	62%

== Sales ==
Calendar year	Europe	China	Brazil
2009	6,520		
2010	70,156		
2011	68,643		
2012	52,228		
2013	41,888		
2014	34,588		
2015	31,444		
2016	28,034		
2017	46,689	22,634	
2018	78,832	20,588	628
2019	76,104	9,372	440
2020	54,468	3,725	141
2021	53,119	6,937	1
2022	36,868	4,763	
2023		3,050	
2024		3,724	
2025		2,077	
