= Stellantis Sochaux Plant =

French car manufacturing and assembly plant

Coordinates: 47.509583°N 6.824167°E

The Stellantis Sochaux Plant is one of the principal car plants in France - in 2007 approximately 326,000 cars were produced there, and as of May 2011 the staff numbered 11,972 permanent workers, approximately 2,000 temporary workers, as well as over 800 employees from other companies working at the Sochaux plant. The plant was created by Peugeot in 1912, initially as a truck factory, but by the 1930s it had become the company's principal car manufacturing plant, and the main production site for all principal Peugeot models from then until 1972, when the company established a second major French car assembly plant in Mulhouse.

In December 2010 the plant produced its 20 millionth car and celebrated by donating the car in question, a Peugeot 5008, to the Haiti Protestant Federation (Fédération protestante d'Haïti), backing the charity's orphan support work in the wake of a major earthquake.

The plant is located in Sochaux in the department Doubs, at the eastern extremity of the Franche-Comté. During the first decade of the twenty-first century the plant's principal product was the Peugeot 307, while the company's smaller cars were produced at the Mulhouse plant, less than two hours by road to the east, and the larger 406s and 407s were produced at the Rennes plant in north-west France. The low volume Peugeot 607 was also produced at Sochaux for most of its life.

Currently, Sochaux production is focused on Peugeot's 3008 and 5008 models. In addition, a new era dawned in 2011 when, for the first time, a Citroën branded car, the Citroën DS5, joined the Peugeots on the Sochaux production lines.

== Location and history ==
Peugeot's origins as an automaker were in the Franche-Comté region, to the west of Belfort and Alsace, and a short distance to the north of the Swiss frontier. The Sochaux plant, opened for the manufacture of trucks in 1912, was therefore located in a region where the Peugeot family was already a significant industrial force, though the town of Sochaux itself had till that point industrialized without the benefit of a Peugeot presence.

By the mid-1920s, Peugeot auto production was focused on four sites at Beaulieu, Audincourt and Sochaux (all three in the Montbéliard region) and at Moulineaux (a short distance downstream from Rouen). The decade saw major investment in upgrading the facilities and production plant at Sochaux. Between 1925 and 1929, progressively, all Peugeot auto-production was concentrated on the Sochaux plant, which prepared Peugeot for greatly increased volumes during the 1930s, a decade of significant growth in auto-markets across Western Europe. The concentration of Peugeot automobile production on a single site coincided with the switch to building car bodies using steel panels. Large quantities of bulky steel were needed, and large, expensive presses were used intensively to form the steel sheets into body panels. Artisan-style workshop manufacture was no longer appropriate to large-scale auto-production, and at Sochaux Peugeot had the space to concentrate industrial scale metalworking on a single site. By 1935, with mass production techniques developed and applied (albeit without quite the level of publicity that earlier had accompanied this development at the Citroën and Opel plants at Paris and Rüsselsheim), Peugeot's Sochaux plant was employing 12,000 people and producing 40,000 cars annually. In 1937 Peugeot sales overtook those of Renault, and by 1939, still with production concentrated on the single plant at Sochaux, Peugeot held 25% of the French auto-market.

In terms of geography Peugeot was an exception to the pattern established by the other major French auto-makers which concentrated themselves into an area of appropriate specialised skills in Paris and the surrounding industrial suburbs during the first half of the twentieth century and remained there, even after the carriage makers’ skills had become of vanishingly little relevance to auto-making, well into the century's second half.

== Production departments ==
The site contains (2012), principally, the following production departments:

- Panel presses
- Body welding
- Body Painting
- Assembly
- Quality Control
- Logistics
- Engine plant

During the decades following the war, while other mainstream automakers increasingly used components bought in from specialist suppliers, Peugeot stood out on account of the extent to which they manufactured in-house their own components and sub-assemblies, with the result that Peugeot's Sochaux facility performed an unusually broad range of manufacturing activities. However, at the end of the 1990s, at the instigation of the then chairman Jean-Martin Folz, there was an acceptance that manufacturing all your own components was not the most cost-effective approach to auto-making, and several departments were closed down, including the central tool production facility, the seating factory and the foundry.

In 2011 Peugeot announced their intention of purchase shock absorbers from a Japanese supplier's Spanish plant, and their resulting plans to close the Sochaux shock absorber manufacturing facility If this closure goes ahead 600 people will need to be redeployed.

== Research and development ==
About 4,000 people working on the Sochaux site are involved in research and development, a particularly active area of current research involving replacement of the company's "Platform 2" models, the type 308 and C4.

== Environmental politics ==
The Sochaux site has been covered by ISO 14001 certification since July 1999. The following environmental achievements are cited:

- In 8 years, non-recyclable waste has been cut by 75%.
- In 10 years, water consumption has been cut by 80%.
- In 8 years, CO_{2} emission reduced by 75%

The staff car park was roofed over in 2010, and covered with 9,300 m^{2} (100,000 sq ft) of solar panels which produce 1,400 kW, saving 450 tons of CO_{2} emissions annually.

== See also ==
- Peugeot
- Stellantis
- Sochaux
- Musée de l'Aventure Peugeot

== Book ==
- 2000 : Retour sur la condition ouvrière, Michel Pialoux et Stéphane Beaud, Paris, Editions Fayard.

== Films ==
- Avec le sang des autres, film documentaire de Bruno Muel, France, 1974, 50'
- Sochaux, cadences en chaîne, film documentaire de Laurence Jourdan, France, 2010, 55'

...
