= Citroën C5 X =

French mid-size crossover estate

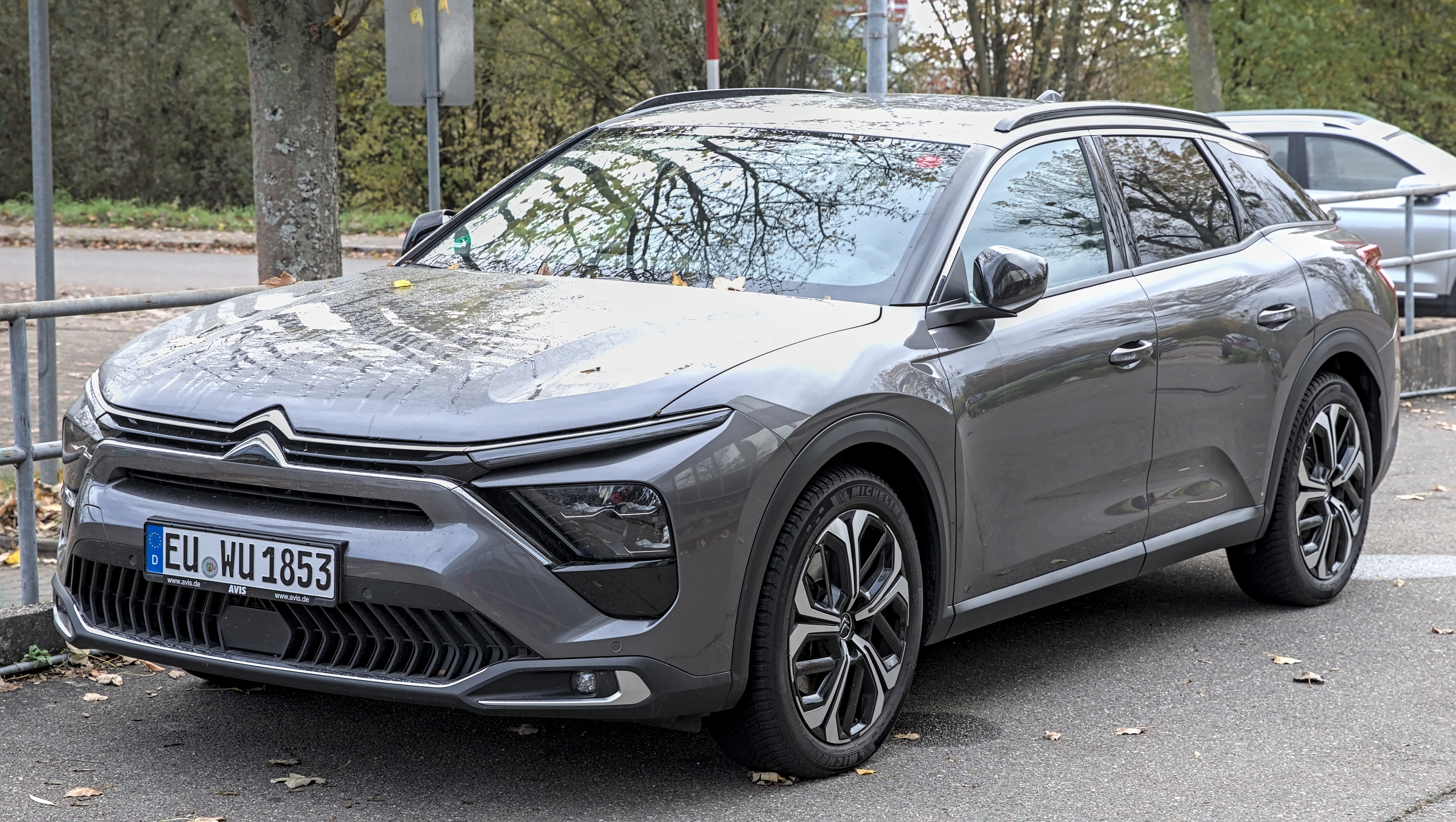

Overview
- Manufacturer: Citroën
- Also called: Citroën Versailles C5 X (China)
- Production: June 2021 – present (China); 2022–2025 (United Kingdom and Ireland); 2022–2026 (Europe)
- Assembly: China: Chengdu (Dongfeng-PSA)
- Designer: Frédéric Angibaud (exterior); Diogo Jo (interior)

Body and chassis
- Class: Mid-size crossover SUV (D)
- Body style: 5-door estate
- Layout: Front-engine, front-wheel-drive
- Platform: EMP2 V3
- Related: Peugeot 408 (crossover); DS N°4

Powertrain
- Engine: Petrol: 1.2 L EB2DTS turbo I3; 1.6 L PureTech (EP6FDT) turbo I4; 1.6 L PureTech (EP6FDT) turbo PHEV I4
- Electric motor: Synchronous (PHEV)
- Power output: 130–180 hp (132–182 PS; 97–134 kW); 225 hp (228 PS; 168 kW) (PHEV)
- Transmission: 8-speed Aisin AWF8F35 automatic
- Battery: 12.4 kWh lithium-ion (PHEV)
- Electric range: 39 mi (63 km) (WLTP)

Dimensions
- Wheelbase: 2,785 mm (109.6 in)
- Length: 4,805 mm (189.2 in)
- Width: 1,865 mm (73.4 in)
- Height: 1,485 mm (58.5 in)
- Curb weight: 1,418–1,722 kg (3,126–3,796 lb)

Chronology
- Predecessor: Citroen C5; Citroën C6

The Citroën C5 X is a mid-size crossover SUV produced by the French brand Citroën since June 2021.

== Overview ==
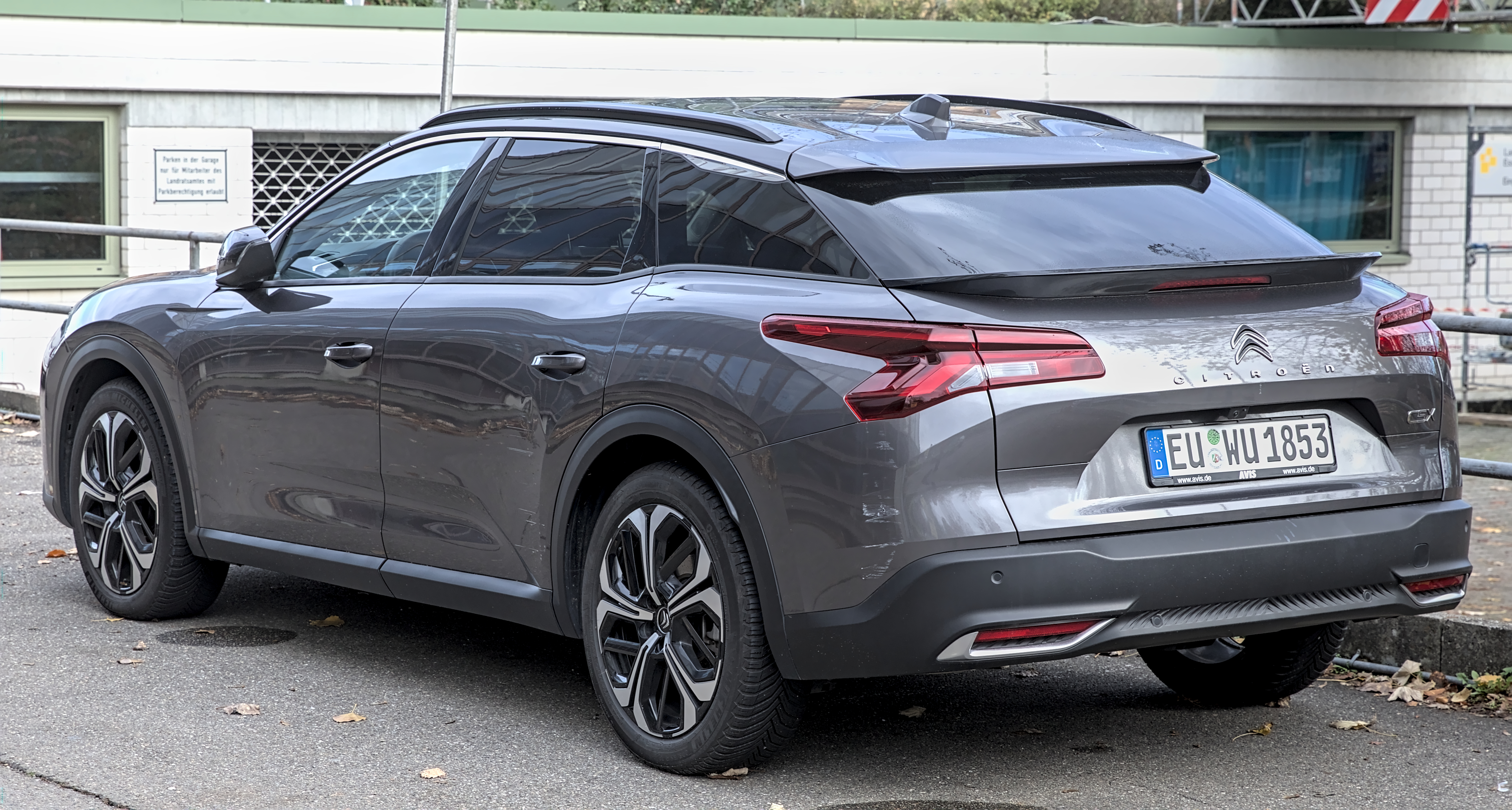
Rear view

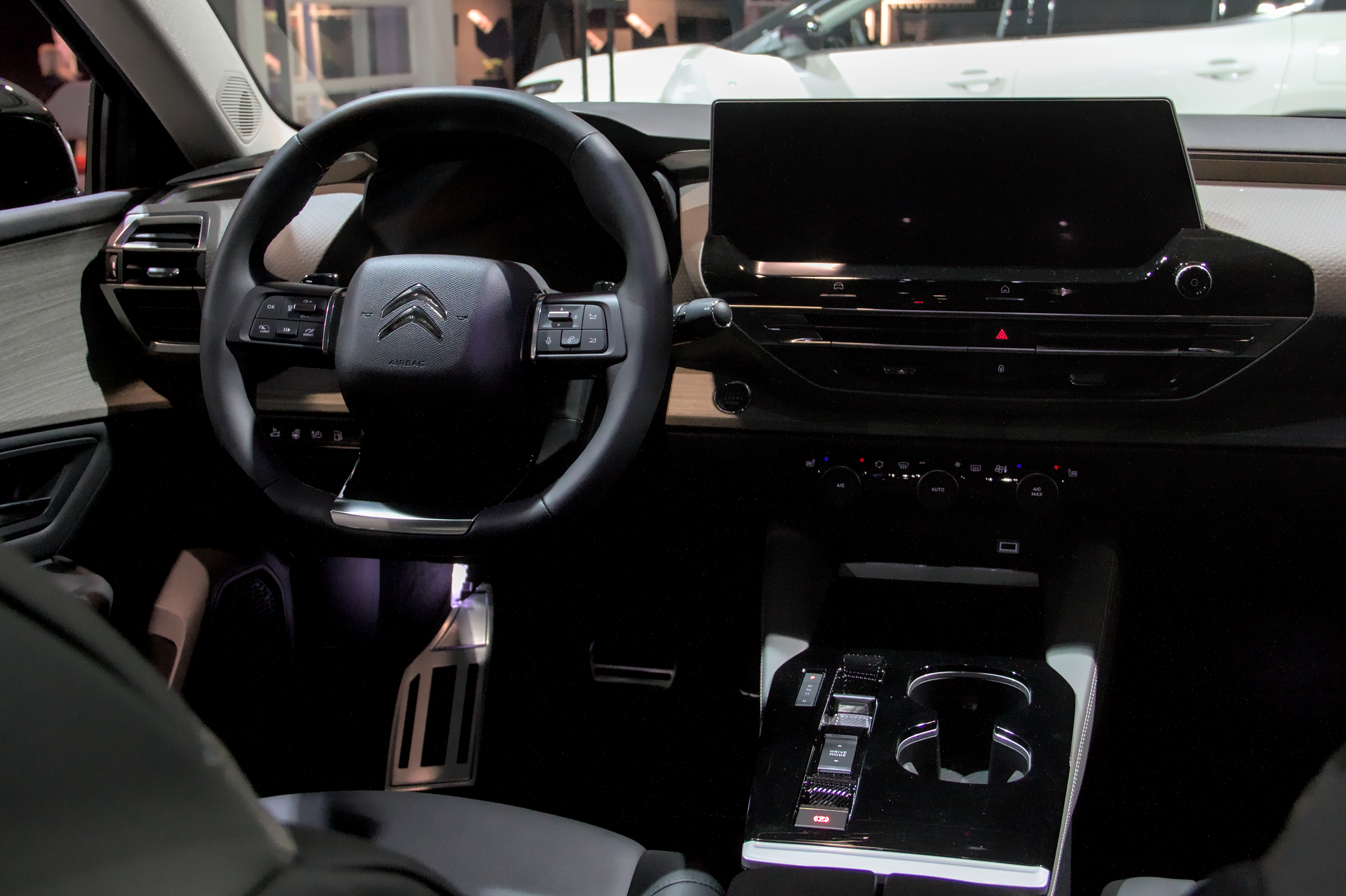
Interior

The nameplate was previously used on the Citroën C5. Dubbed the C5 X, the "X" meaning crossover, it is styled as a station wagon, with increased ground clearance. It is a large crossover SUV, for buyers who want a sport utility vehicle, or an estate car. The vehicle is intended to be a combination of an SUV, saloon and estate. It is available as a plug-in hybrid with shared technology from the Peugeot 508. The C5 X is marketed as the Dongfeng Citroën Versailles C5 X in China, resurrecting the Versailles name once used for the Ford Versailles.

The C5 X follows the design of the 2016 CXperience concept. The C5 X is approximately 50 mm (2.0 in) shorter, about 13 mm (0.5 in) taller, and about 130 mm (5.1 in) less wide than the CXperience. The C5 X PHEV comes in 4 driving modes, Electric, Hybrid, Comfort and Sport, with 39 miles (63 km) of fully electric driving. The C5 X is based on the EMP2 V3, shared with the similar Peugeot 408.

In May 2025, the C5 X was discontinued in the United Kingdom and Ireland with right-hand drive production ended in the same month, therefore the C5 Aircross became the flagship model in those markets. However, sales of the C5 X continued in other European countries. Thierry Koskas, CEO of Citroën explained, "I don't think Citroën is very present in the market with the C5 X. It's a tiny segment, because as soon as you go into the D-segment, you compete with premium brands, and the sales of generalist brands are small. So I'm not sure we'll do anything in this segment in the future."

== Specifications ==
The crossover has a choice of two petrol and one PHEV options. The PHEV was the most powerful; it has a battery capacity of 12.4 kWh (45 MJ).

=== Powertrain ===
Internal combustion engines
Spec Model	Engine	Power	Torque	Displacement	Top speed	Transmission	Acceleration (0-60 mph/100 km/h)	Drive	Production
Petrol models
1.2 PureTech 130	1.2 L EB2DTS I3 turbo	131 hp (98 kW; 133 PS) @ 5500	230 N⋅m (170 lb⋅ft) @ 1750	1,199 cc (1.2 L; 73.2 cu in)	210 km/h (130 mph)	8-speed automatic transmission	11.3 sec	FWD	Q3 2021–
1.6 PureTech 180	1.6 L EP6FDT I4 turbo	181 hp (135 kW; 184 PS) @ 5500	300 N⋅m (221 lb⋅ft) @ 1900	1,598 cc (1.6 L; 97.5 cu in)	230 km/h (143 mph)	8-speed automatic transmission	8.8 sec	FWD	Q1 2022–
Plug-in hybrid models
1.6 PureTech 225 e-EAT8	1.6 L EP6FADTXD I4 turbo	225 hp (168 kW; 228 PS) @ 6000	360 N⋅m (266 lb⋅ft) @ 1750	1,598 cc (1.6 L; 97.5 cu in)	233 km/h (145 mph)	8-speed automatic transmission	7.9 sec	FWD	Q3 2021–

Electric details
Spec Model	All-electric range	Electric power	Electric torque	Electric top speed	Battery	Availability
1.6 PureTech 225 e-EAT8	59–60 km (37–37 mi)	110 hp (82 kW; 112 PS)	320 N⋅m (236 lb⋅ft)	135 km/h (84 mph)	12.4 kWh lithium-ion	Q3 2021–

== Safety ==
=== ANCAP ===
ANCAP test results Citroen C5 X (2022, aligned with Euro NCAP)
Test	Points	%
Overall:	5 /5 stars	
Adult occupant:	31.21	82%
Child occupant:	43.27	88%
Pedestrian:	37.77	69%
Safety assist:	13.52	84%

=== Euro NCAP ===
Euro NCAP test results Citroën C5 X 1.6 petrol hybrid (2022)
Test	Points	%
Overall:	4 /5 stars	
Adult occupant:	31.2	82%
Child occupant:	42.7	87%
Pedestrian:	37.8	69%
Safety assist:	10.6	66%

== Awards ==
In 2023, the C5 X won the "Best Large Car" award at the 13th edition of the Women's World Car of the Year.

== Sales ==
Year	China
2021	13,937
2022	45,151
2023	15,165
2024	18,133
2025	14,399
