= Citroën C5 =

Large family car by Citroën, 2000–2022

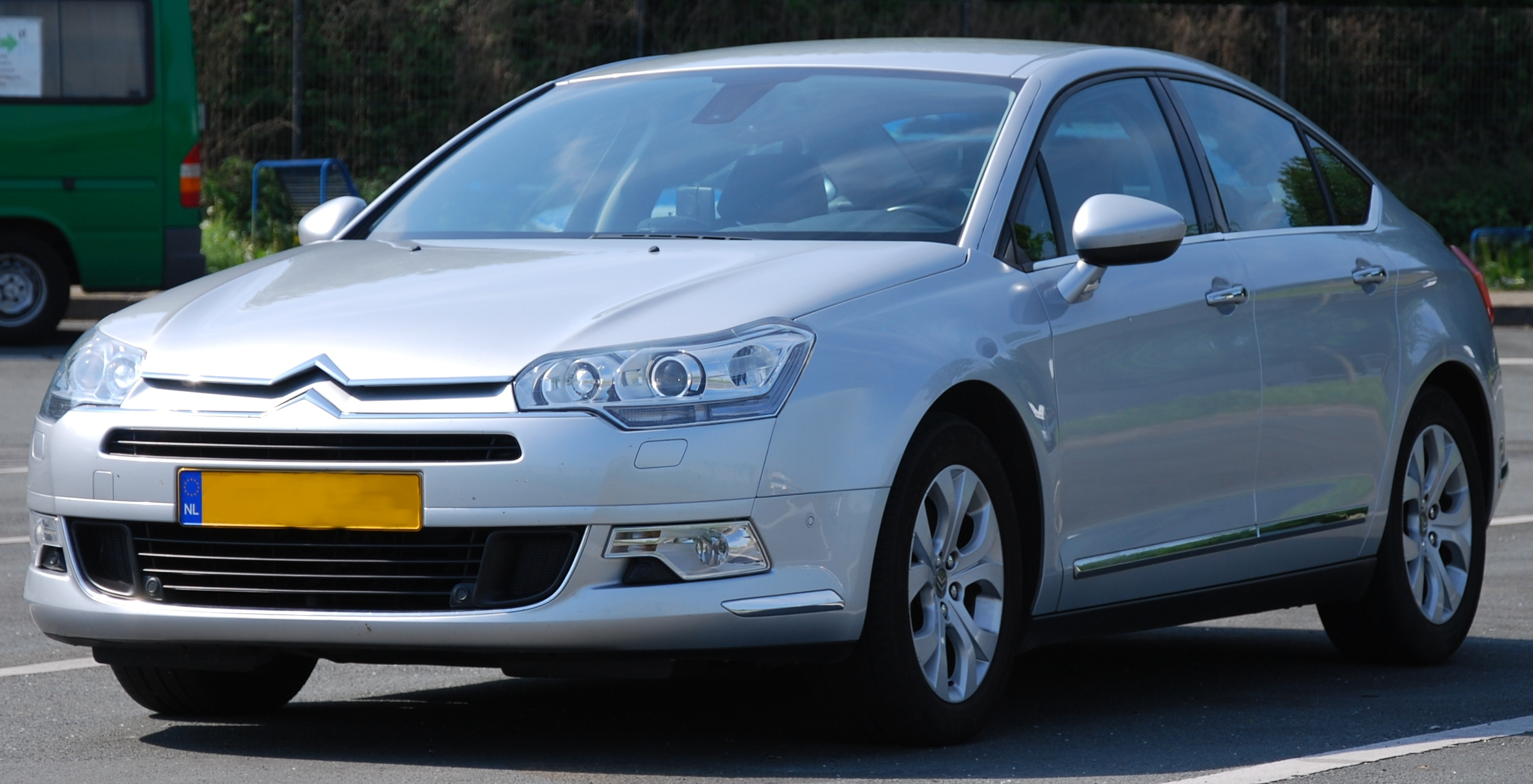

Overview
- Manufacturer: Citroën (Note: PSA Group (2001–2021); Stellantis (2021–present))
- Production: 2000–2018 (Europe); 2008–2021 (China)

Body and chassis
- Class: Large family car (D)
- Layout: Front-engine, front-wheel-drive

Chronology
- Predecessor: Citroën Xantia; Citroën XM
- Successor: Citroën C5 X DS 5 (for first-generation liftback)

The Citroën C5 is a large family car produced by the French manufacturer Citroën between 2000 and 2018 in France, and between 2008 and 2022 in China, over two generations. It replaced the Citroën Xantia, in the large family car class, and is the first modern Citroën with "Cx" naming nomenclature, previously used by its ancestors, the C4 and C6 from 1930. A crossover, unrelated to the previous generations, was released in 2021, with crossover styling and marketed as the Citroën C5 X.

== First generation (DC/DE; 2001) ==
First generation
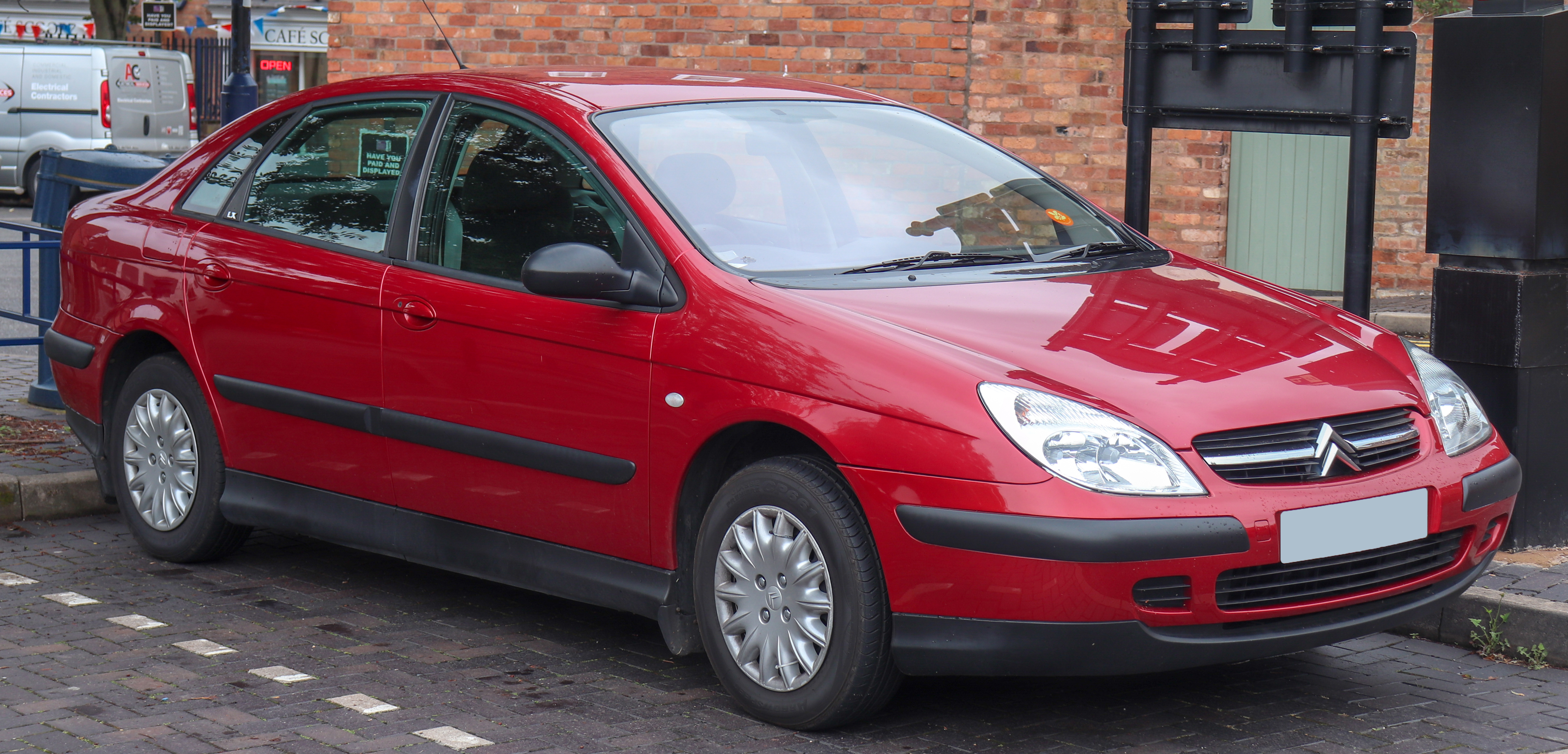

Overview
- Model code: DC/DE
- Production: 2000–2007
- Assembly: France: Rennes (Rennes Plant)
- Designer: Ivo Groen

Body and chassis
- Body style: 5-door liftback 5-door estate
- Platform: PSA PF3
- Related: Citroën C6; Peugeot 407

Powertrain
- Engine: Petrol: 1.8 L EW7 I4; 2.0 L EW10 I4; 3.0 L ES9 V6; Diesel: 1.6 DV6 HDi L I4; 2.0 DW10 HDi L I4; 2.2 DW12 HDi L I4
- Transmission: 5-speed manual 6-speed manual 4-speed automatic 6-speed automatic

Dimensions
- Wheelbase: 2,750 mm (108.3 in)
- Length: 4,745 mm (186.8 in) (liftback); 4,839 mm (190.5 in) (estate)
- Width: 1,770 mm (69.7 in)
- Height: 1,476 mm (58.1 in) (liftback); 1,511 mm (59.5 in) (estate)

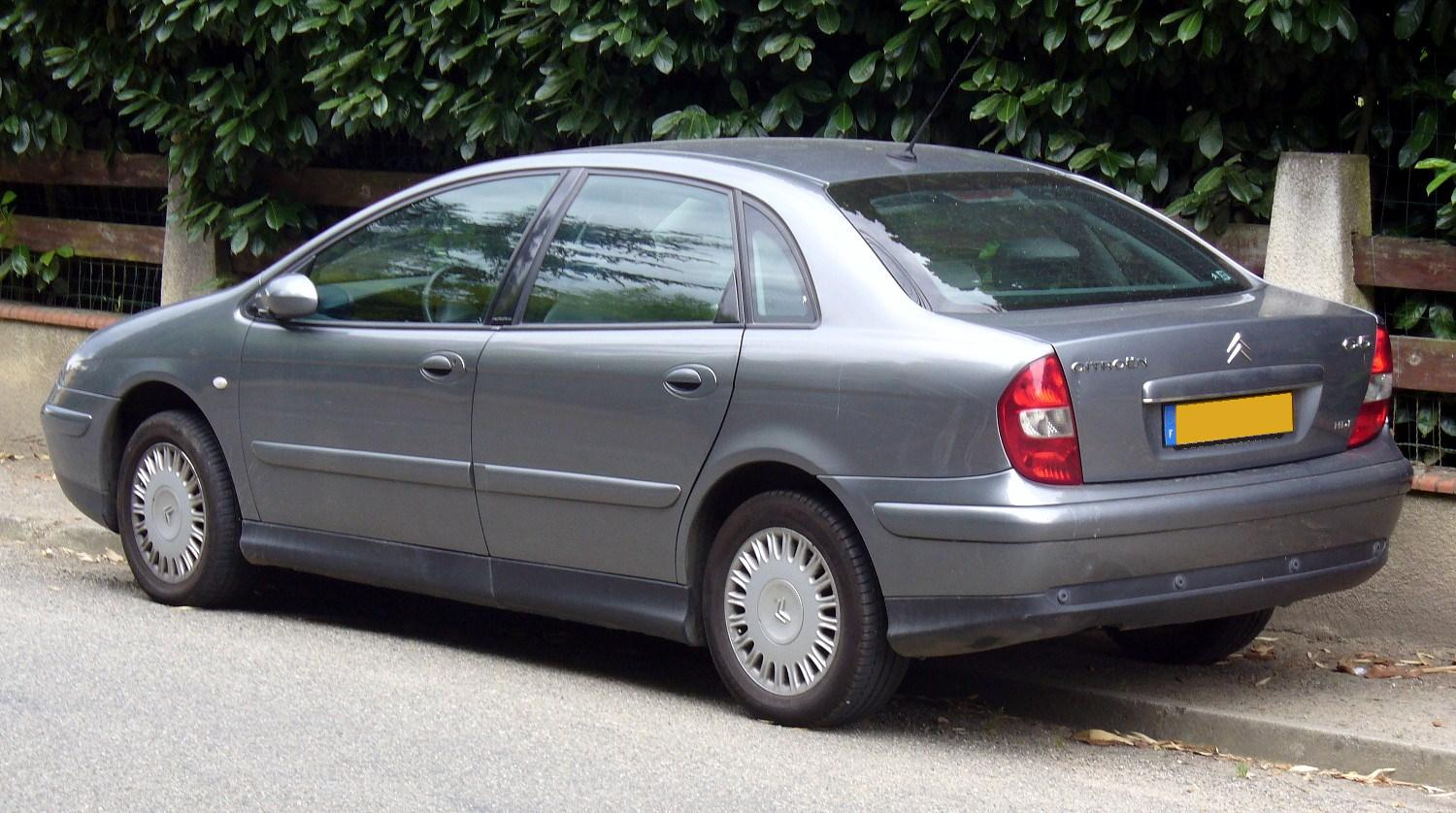
Liftback (pre-facelift)

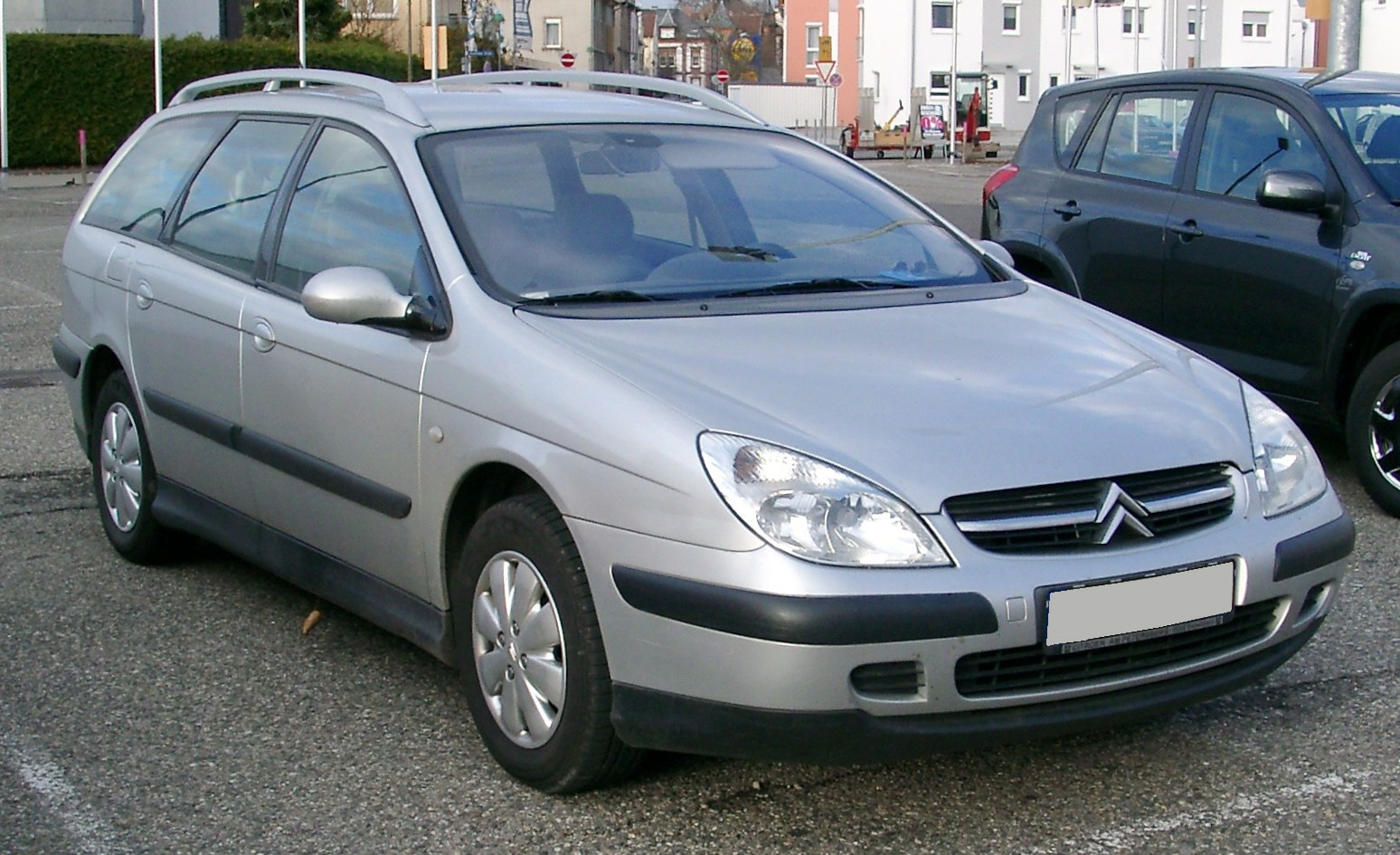
Estate (pre-facelift)

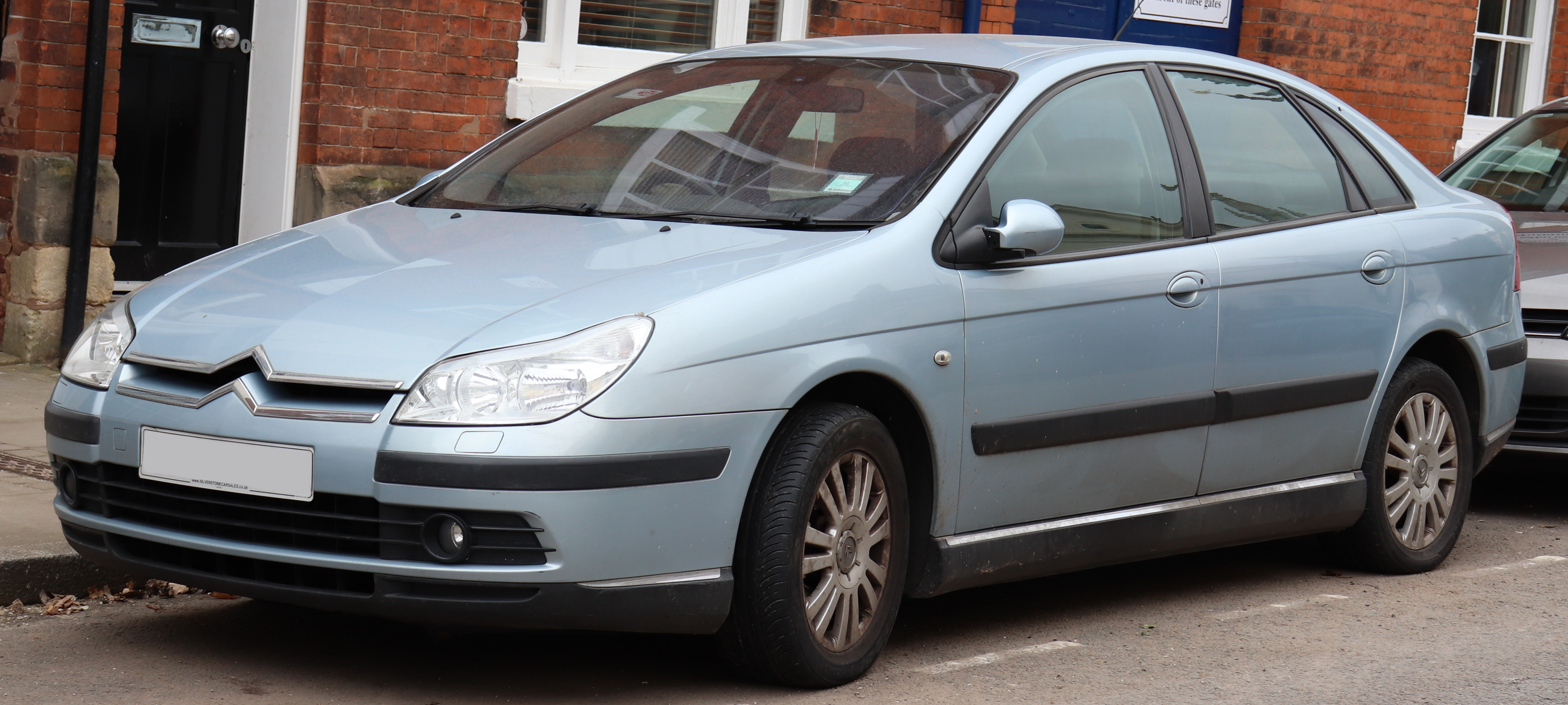
Liftback (facelift)

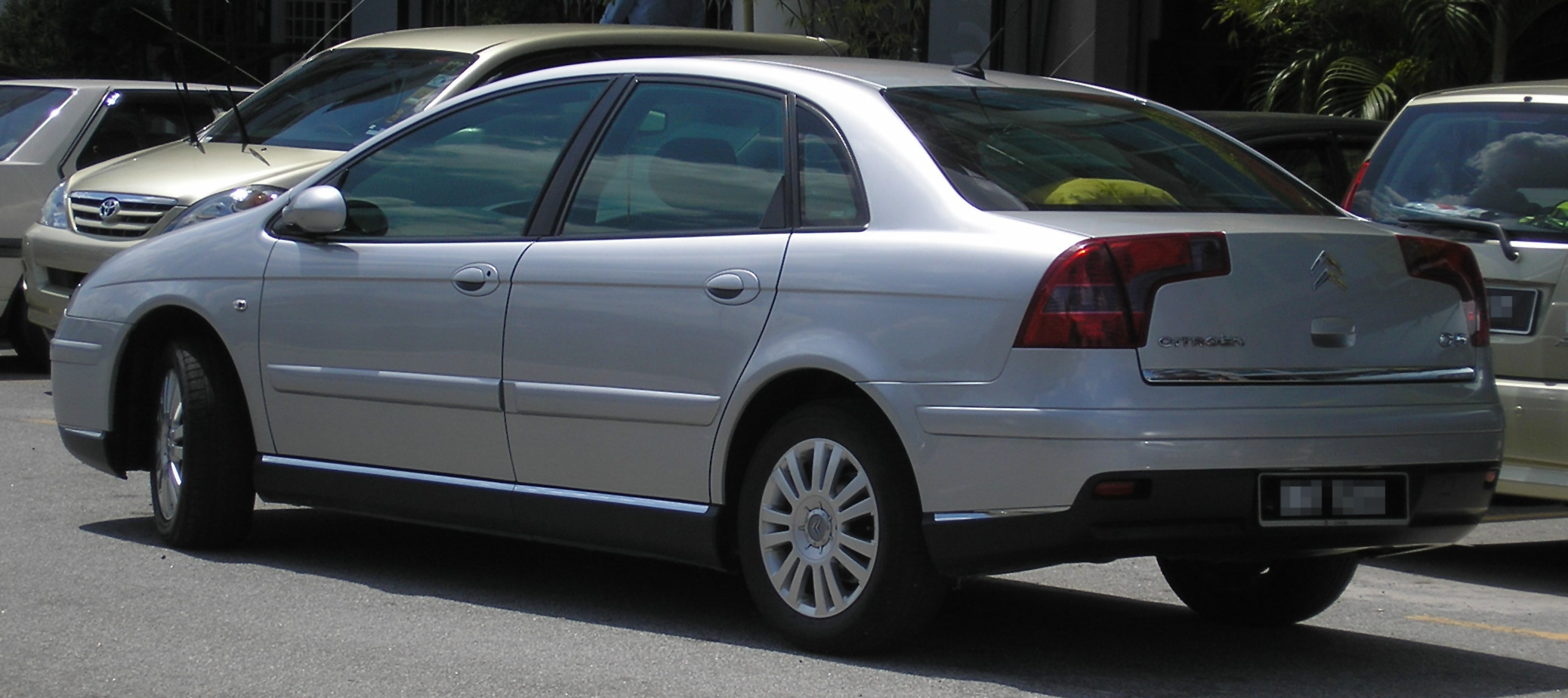
Liftback (facelift)

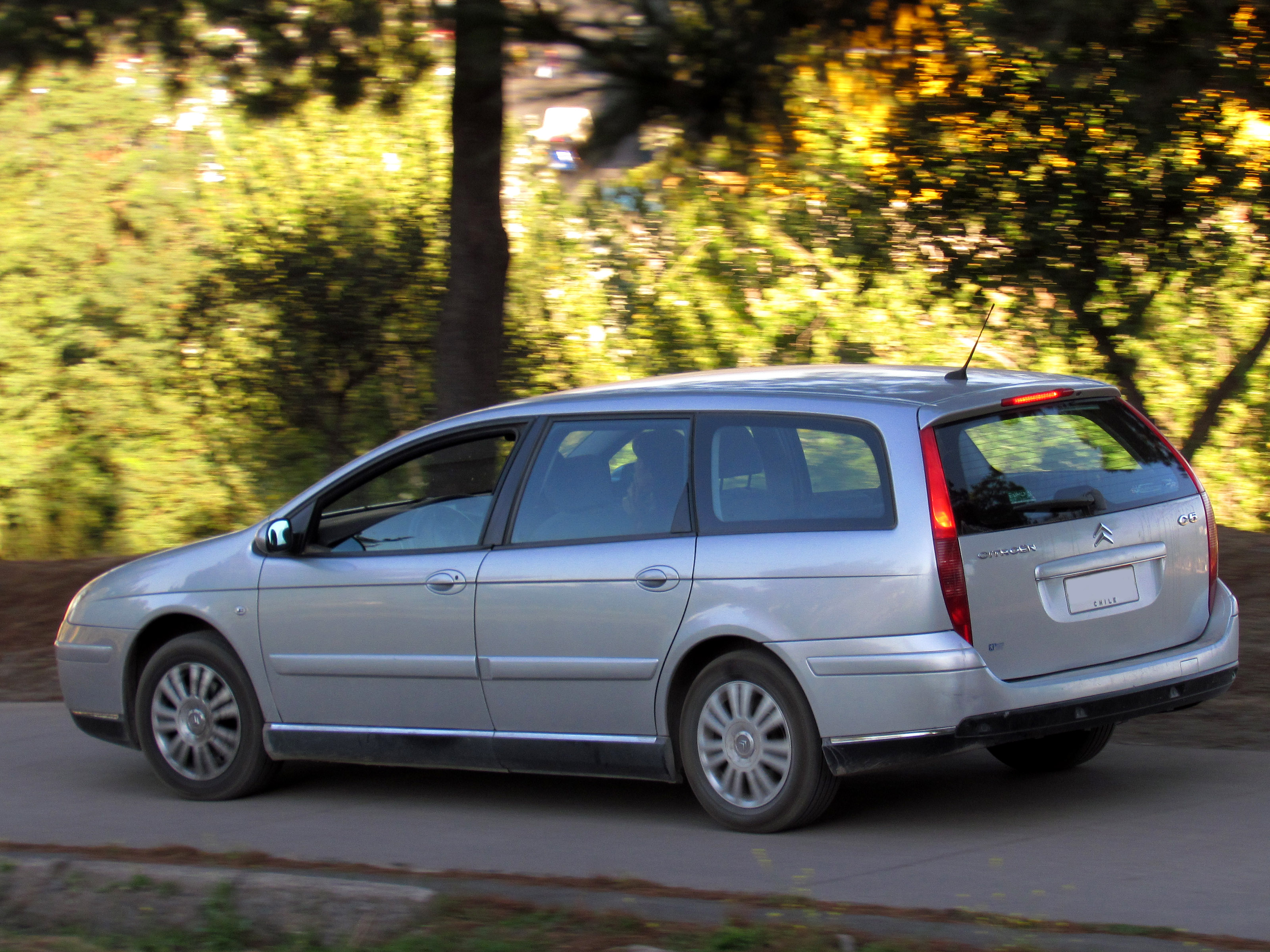
Estate (facelift)

The first-generation C5 was available as a five-door liftback or five-door estate styles only. As a liftback, Citroën had completely reversed the design philosophy from the fastback saloon era of Robert Opron. Production commenced in the end of 2000. Sales in the United Kingdom commenced in April 2001.

Power came from 1.8 and 2.0 litre straight-4 and 3.0 litre V6 petrol engines, as well as 1.6, 2.0 and 2.2 litre direct injection diesel engines. The first-generation C5 was the last Citroën developed under the chairmanship of Jacques Calvet (1982–1999). The C5 had a further development of Citroën's hydropneumatic suspension, now called Hydractive 3.

The major change with this system was the use of electronic sensors to replace the mechanical height correctors seen in all previous hydropneumatic cars. This allowed the suspension computer to automatically control ride height: at high speed the suspension is lowered to reduce drag and at low speeds on bumpy roads the ride height is raised.

Manual control of ride height was retained, though it was overridden by the computer if the car was driven at an inappropriate speed for the selected height. Certain cars also featured the computer controlled ride stiffness, called Hydractive 3+.

In a major break with Citroën tradition, the brakes and steering were no longer powered by the same hydraulic system as the suspension, but the power steering used the same LDS fluid with its own pump. It has been speculated that the primary driver for this was the cost of developing electronic brake force distribution for the system, when the PSA Group already had an implementation for conventional brakes.

Another factor may be the highly responsive nature of 'traditional' Citroën brakes, which some have found hard to adjust to on other hydropneumatic cars, though it is felt by some to be superior.

In September 2004, the C5 underwent a major facelift (new front and rear ends; same centre section) to bring it into line with the look of the new Citroën C4. The liftback was lengthened from 4,618 mm (181.8 in) to 4,745 mm (186.8 in) and the estate from 4,755 mm (187.2 in) to 4,840 mm (190.6 in). Also, this new version got swivelling directional headlights.

The Hydractive suspension improves ride quality, keeps the car levelled, and enables the car to drive on three wheels if one tire is flat. The suspension is derived from the Hydropneumatic suspension used in the 1950s Citroën DS. Variations in height using the Hydractive suspension range up to 15 mm (0.6 in) in the front and 11 mm (0.4 in) in the back.

Production ended in December 2007, with the final production number being 720,000. In the United Kingdom, 45,502 models of the car were sold from 2001 to 2004.

Engine	Displacement	Power	Torque	Top speed	0–62 mph (100 km/h) (s)
1.8 L EW7 I4	1749 cc	115 PS (85 kW; 113 hp) at 5,500 rpm	160 N⋅m (118 lb⋅ft) at 4,000 rpm	122 mph (196 km/h)	11.1
1.8 L EW7 I4 with automatic	1749 cc	115 PS (85 kW; 113 hp) at 5,500 rpm	160 N⋅m (118 lb⋅ft) at 4,000 rpm	122 mph (196 km/h)	11.3
2.0 L EW10 I4	1997 cc	136 PS (100 kW; 134 hp) at 6,000 rpm	190 N⋅m (140 lb⋅ft) at 4,100 rpm	129 mph (208 km/h)	9.8
2.0 L EW10 I4 HPI	1997 cc	140 PS (103 kW; 138 hp) at 6,000 rpm	192 N⋅m (142 lb⋅ft) at 4,000 rpm	130 mph (209 km/h)	9.6
2.0 L EW10 I4 VVT	1997 cc	143 PS (105 kW; 141 hp) at 6,000 rpm	200 N⋅m (148 lb⋅ft) at 4,000 rpm	130 mph (209 km/h)	9.1
3.0 L ES9 V6	2946 cc	207 PS (152 kW; 204 hp) at 6,000 rpm	285 N⋅m (210 lb⋅ft) at 3,750 rpm	144 mph (232 km/h)	9.7
3.0 L ES9 V6 VVT	2946 cc	211 PS (155 kW; 208 hp) at 6,000 rpm	290 N⋅m (214 lb⋅ft) at 3,750 rpm	143 mph (230 km/h)	8.6
1.6 L DV6 HDi diesel I4	1560 cc	109 PS (80 kW; 108 hp) at 4,000 rpm	240 N⋅m (180 lb⋅ft) at 1,750 rpm	118 mph (190 km/h)	11.3
2.0 L DW10 HDi diesel I4	1997 cc	90 PS (66 kW; 89 hp) at 4,000 rpm	205 N⋅m (151 lb⋅ft) at 1,900 rpm	112 mph (180 km/h)	13.1
2.0 L DW10 HDi diesel I4	1997 cc	109 PS (80 kW; 108 hp) at 4,000 rpm	250 N⋅m (184 lb⋅ft) at 1,750 rpm	119 mph (192 km/h)	11.3
2.0 L DW10 HDi diesel I4	1997 cc	136 PS (100 kW; 134 hp) at 4,000 rpm	320 N⋅m (236 lb⋅ft) at 2,000 rpm	127 mph (204 km/h)	9.8
2.2 L DW12 HDi diesel I4	2179 cc	133 PS (98 kW; 131 hp) at 4,000 rpm	314 N⋅m (232 lb⋅ft) at 2,000 rpm	127 mph (204 km/h)	10,5
2.2 L DW12 HDi diesel I4	2179 cc	170 PS (125 kW; 168 hp) at 4,000 rpm	400 N⋅m (295 lb⋅ft) at 1,750 rpm	138 mph (222 km/h)	8,5

=== Safety ===
ANCAP test results Citroen C5 5 door hatch (2001)
Test	Score
Overall	5 /5 stars
Frontal offset	12.59/16
Side impact	15.85/16
Pole	2/2
Seat belt reminders	0/3
Whiplash protection	Not Assessed
Pedestrian protection	Not Assessed
Electronic stability control	Not Assessed

ANCAP test results Citroen C5 variant(s) as tested (2005)
Test	Score
Overall	5 /5 stars
Frontal offset	12.95/16
Side impact	14.98/16
Pole	2/2
Seat belt reminders	3/3
Whiplash protection	Not Assessed
Pedestrian protection	Poor
Electronic stability control	Standard

== Second generation (RD/TD; 2008) ==
Second generation
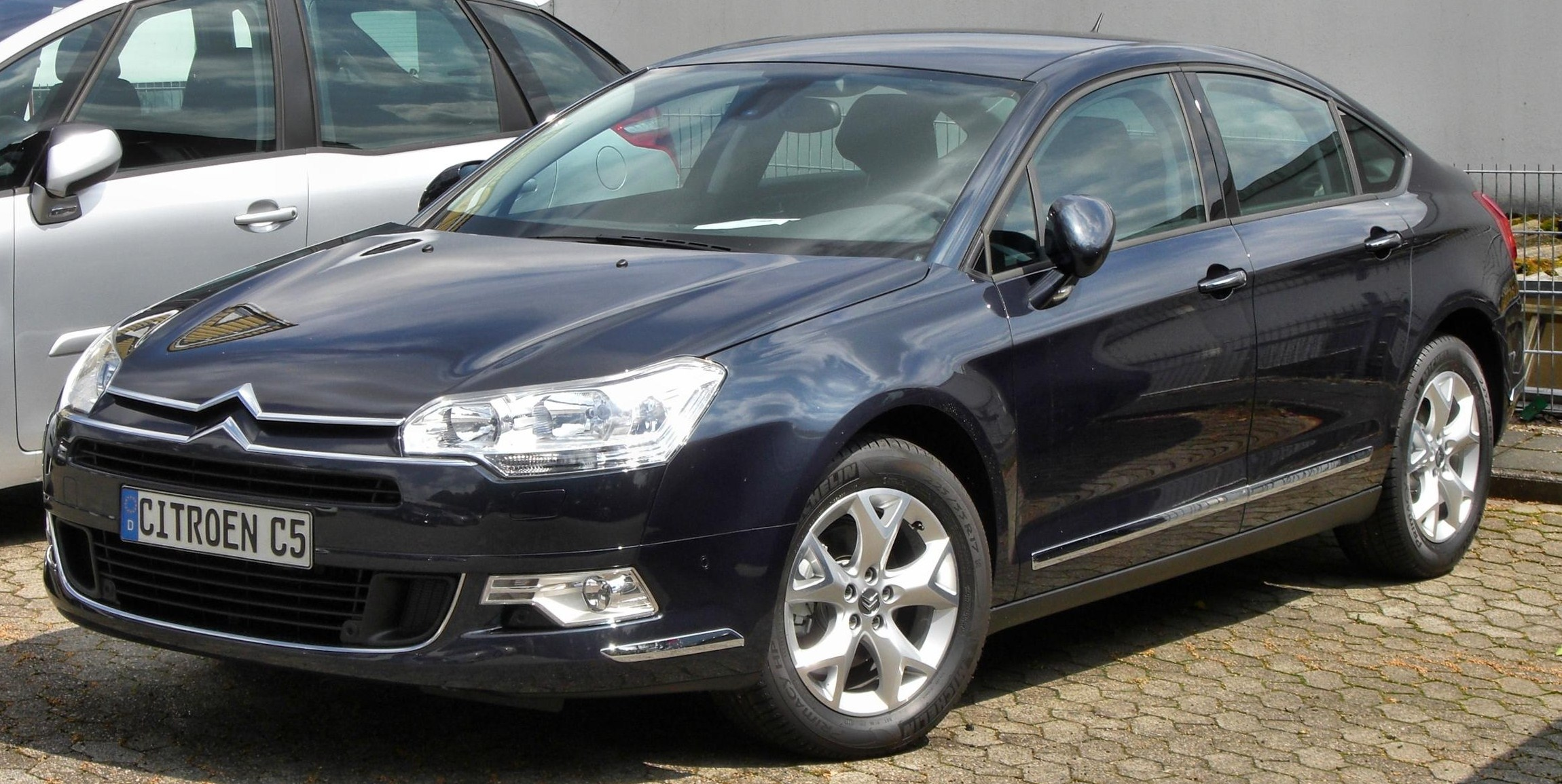

Overview
- Model code: RD/TD
- Production: 2008–2019 (Europe); 2008–2021 (China)
- Assembly: France: Rennes (Rennes Plant); China: Wuhan (Dongfeng-PSA)
- Designer: Domagoj Đukec

Body and chassis
- Body style: 4-door saloon 5-door estate
- Platform: PSA PF3 platform
- Related: Peugeot 508

Powertrain
- Engine: Petrol: 1.6 L EP6 I4; 1.6 L EP6 turbo I4; 1.8 L EW7 I4; 2.0 L EW10 I4; 2.3 L EW12A I4 (China); 3.0 L ES9 V6; Diesel: 1.6 L DV6 I4; 2.0 L DW10 I4; 2.2 L DW12 I4; 2.7 L DT17 HDi V6; 3.0 L DT20 V6
- Transmission: 5-speed manual 6-speed manual 6-speed automatic

Dimensions
- Wheelbase: 2,815 mm (110.8 in)
- Length: Saloon: 4,779 mm (188.1 in); Estate: 4,830 mm (190.2 in)
- Width: 1,860 mm (73.2 in)
- Height: Saloon: 1,455 mm (57.3 in); Estate: 1,495 mm (58.9 in)
- Curb weight: 1,510–1,766 kg (3,329–3,893 lb)

The second-generation C5 was officially unveiled in the beginning of 2008, and does not retain the liftback bodystyle, instead being a regular, three box saloon of an aerodynamic shape.

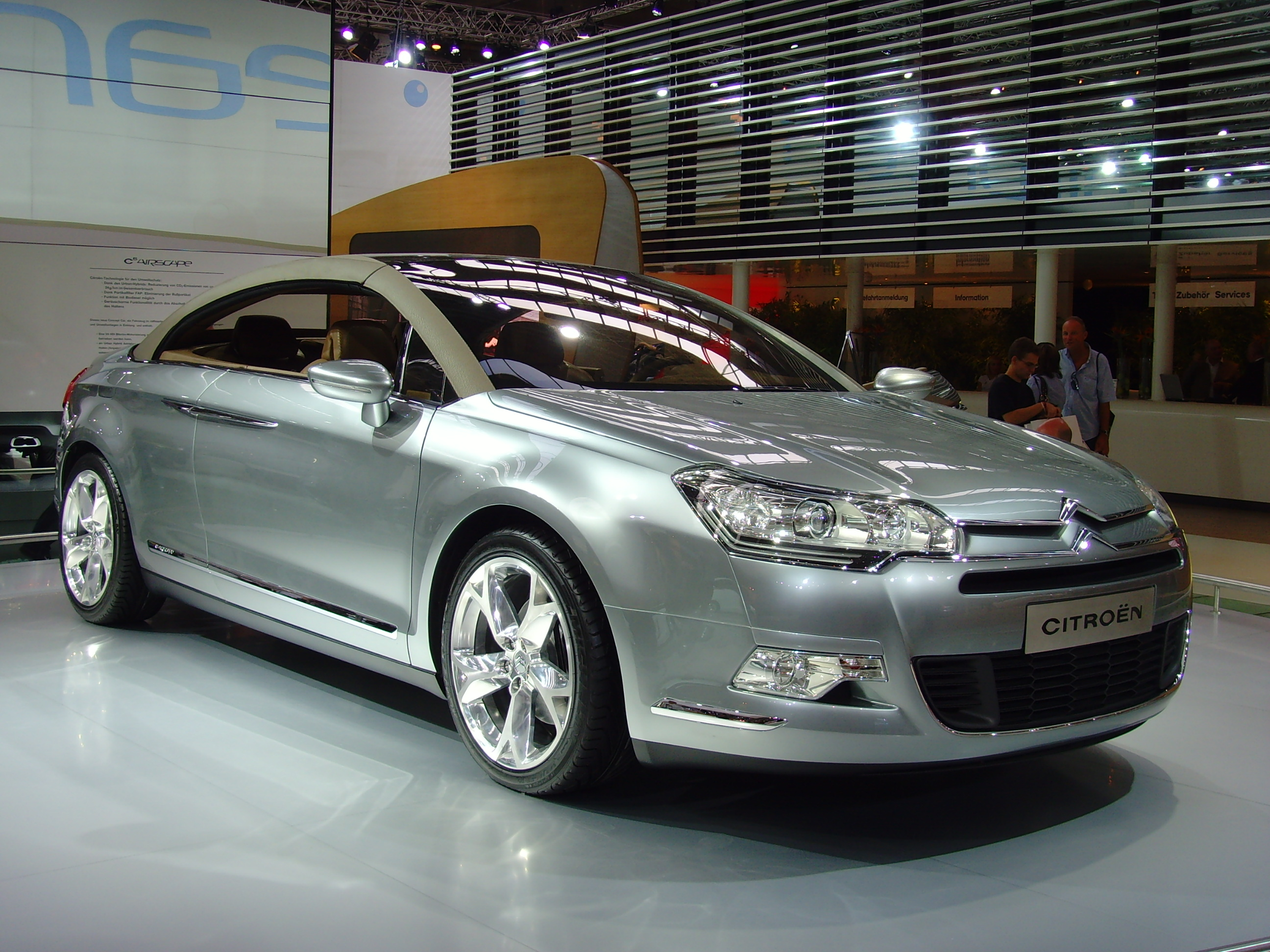
Citroën C5 Airscape Concept

The C5 Airscape concept, which was presented at the Frankfurt Motor Show in September 2007, gave an outlook on the second-generation C5.

It was launched in February 2008, with the estate version following in May 2008, and receives the name of Tourer. This C5 won 2009 Semperit Irish Car of the Year, as well as being awarded 2008–09 Japan's Import Car of the Year. The second generation was presented on 15 January 2008, having its world premiere at the Brussels Motor Show.

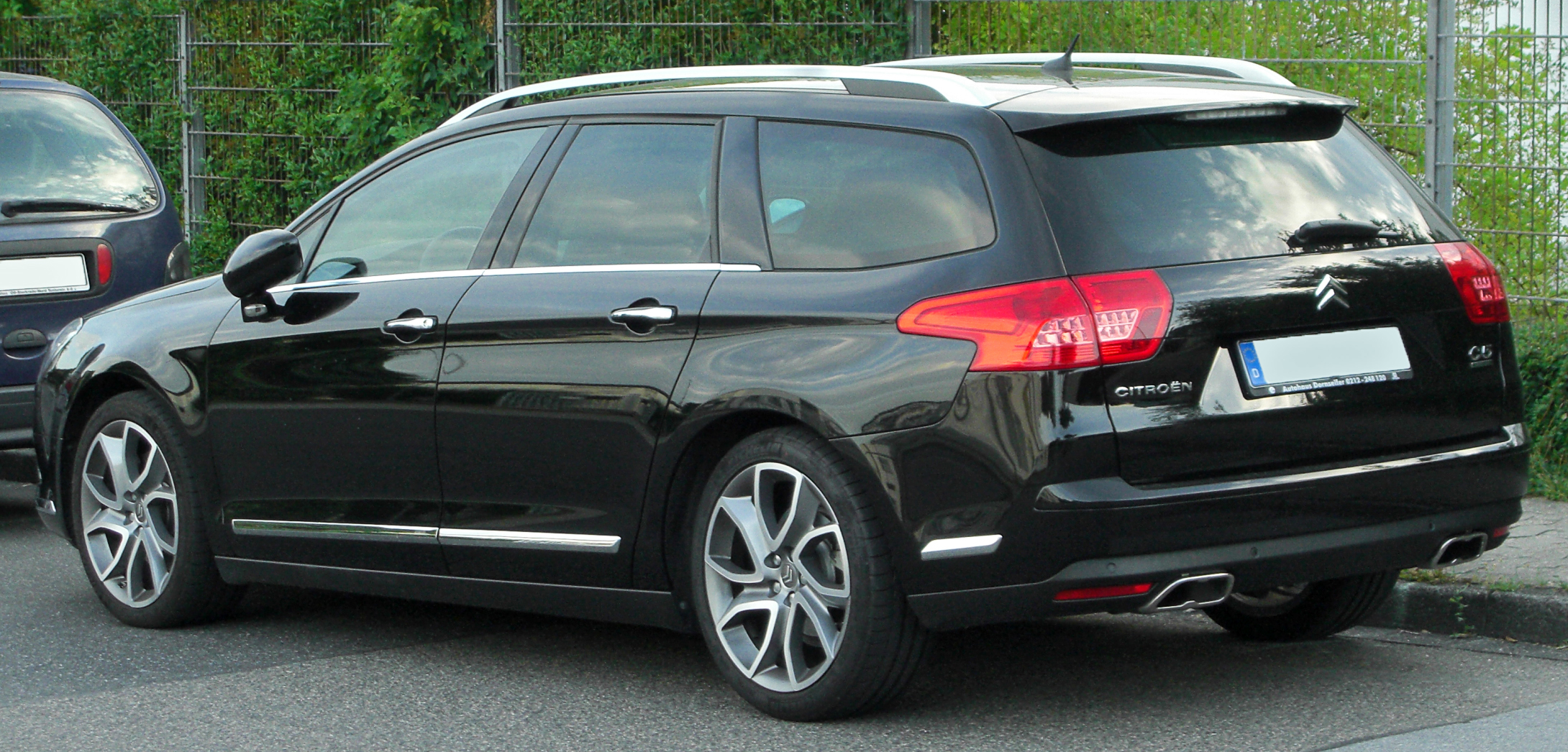
Estate (pre-facelift)

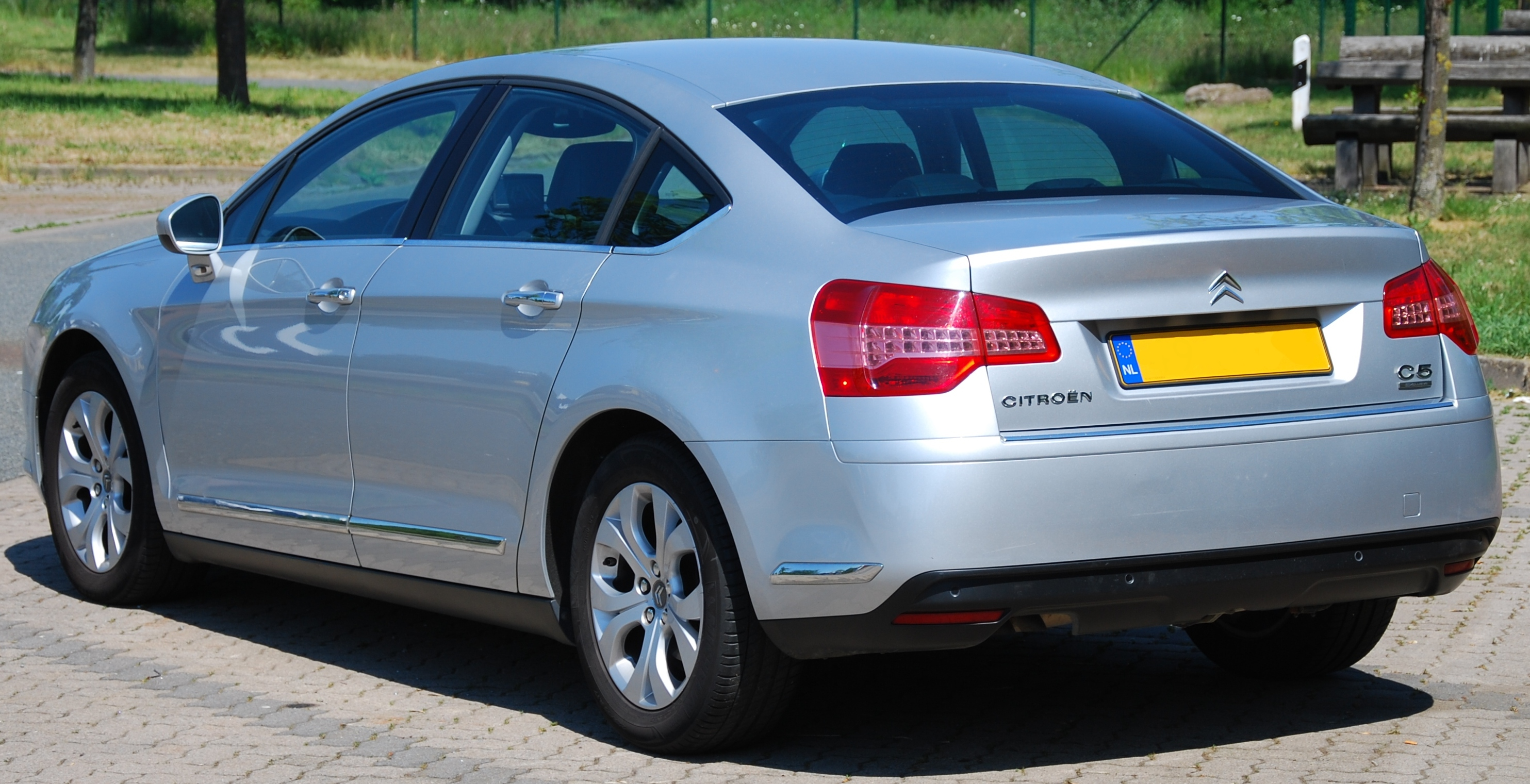
Saloon (pre-facelift)

The second-generation C5 is available with conventional springs, as well as the hydropneumatic suspension and 2.7L Ford AJD-V6/PSA DT17 engine from the Citroën C6. In 2009, the 2.7L was replaced by an updated 3.0L unit which, despite offering more power, has improved fuel consumption and emissions.

In 2010, the 2.0-litre HDi 140 and the 2.2-litreL HDi 173 engines, were replaced by the 2.0L HDi 160 engine, mated to a six speed automatic or manual transmissions to comply with the Euro 5. Similarly, the 2.0 16V 143 bhp petrol engine was replaced by the 1.6-litre THP 155, from the DS3 mated to a six-speed manual transmission.

In 2011, the C5 was given a mild facelift, with a few cosmetic changes, such as LED lights. Three engines were added to the range consisting of two diesels, 2.0 HDI 160, and a 2.2 HDI 200 as well as a petrol engine, 1.6 VTI 120.

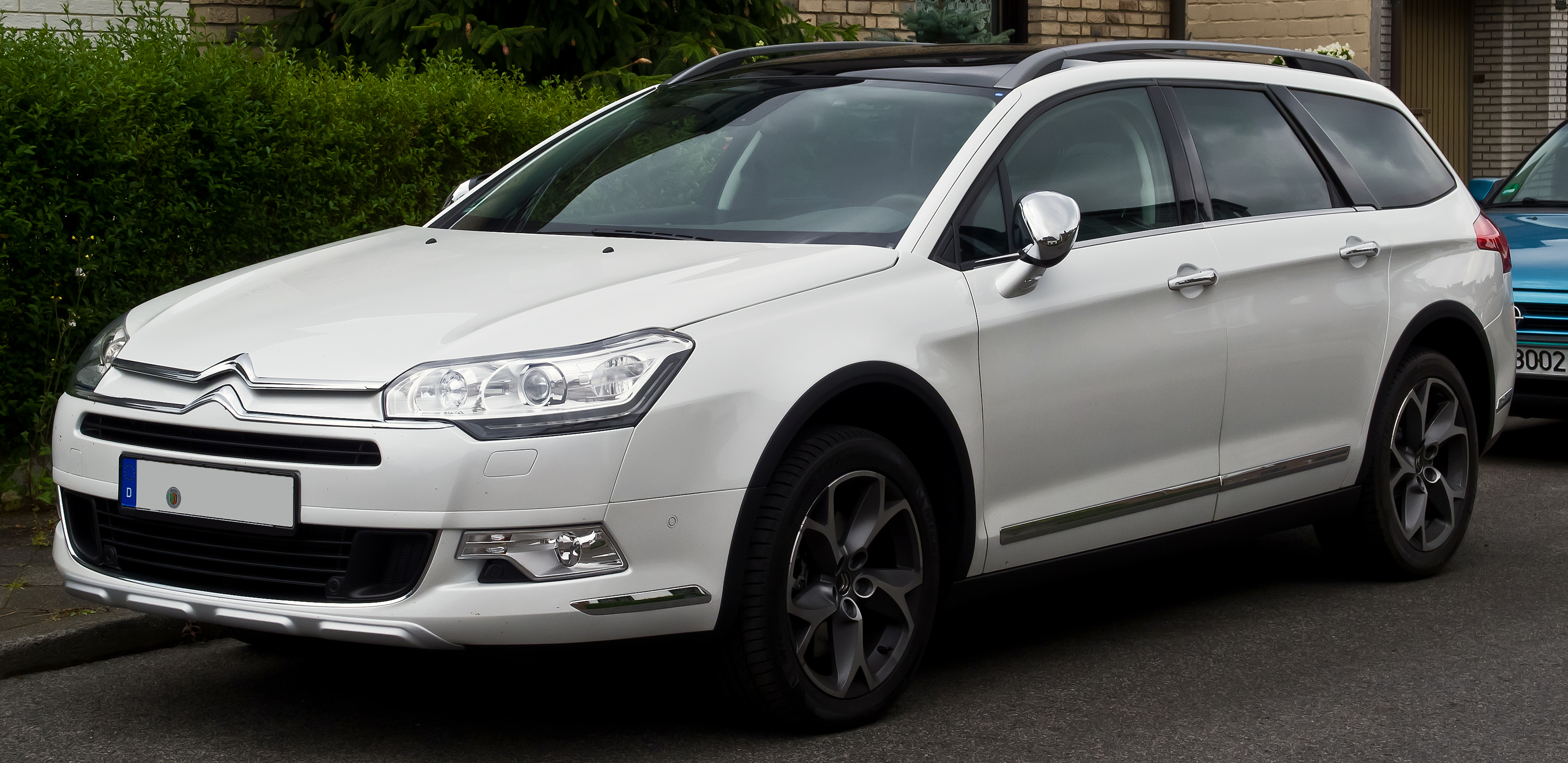

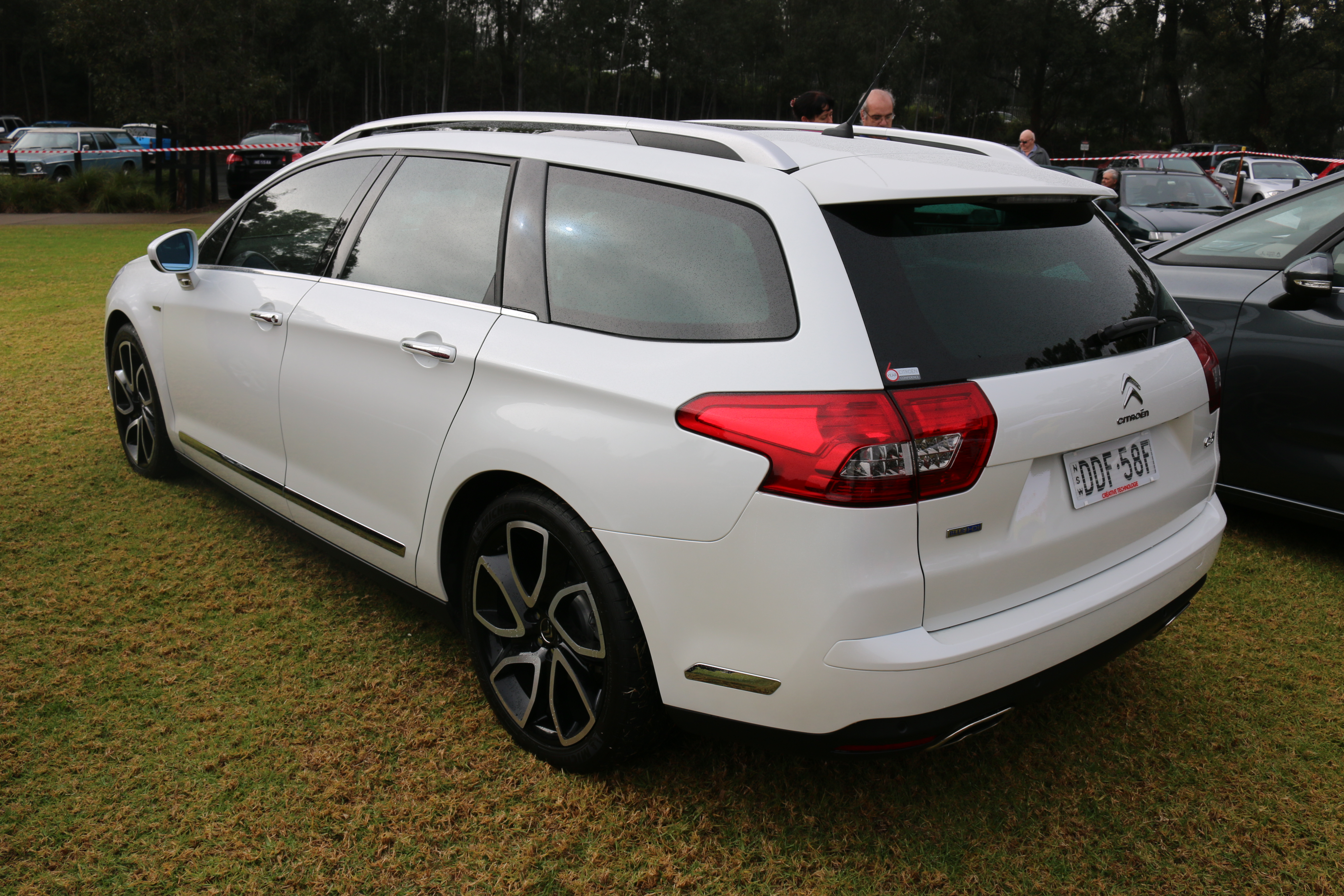
Estate (facelift)

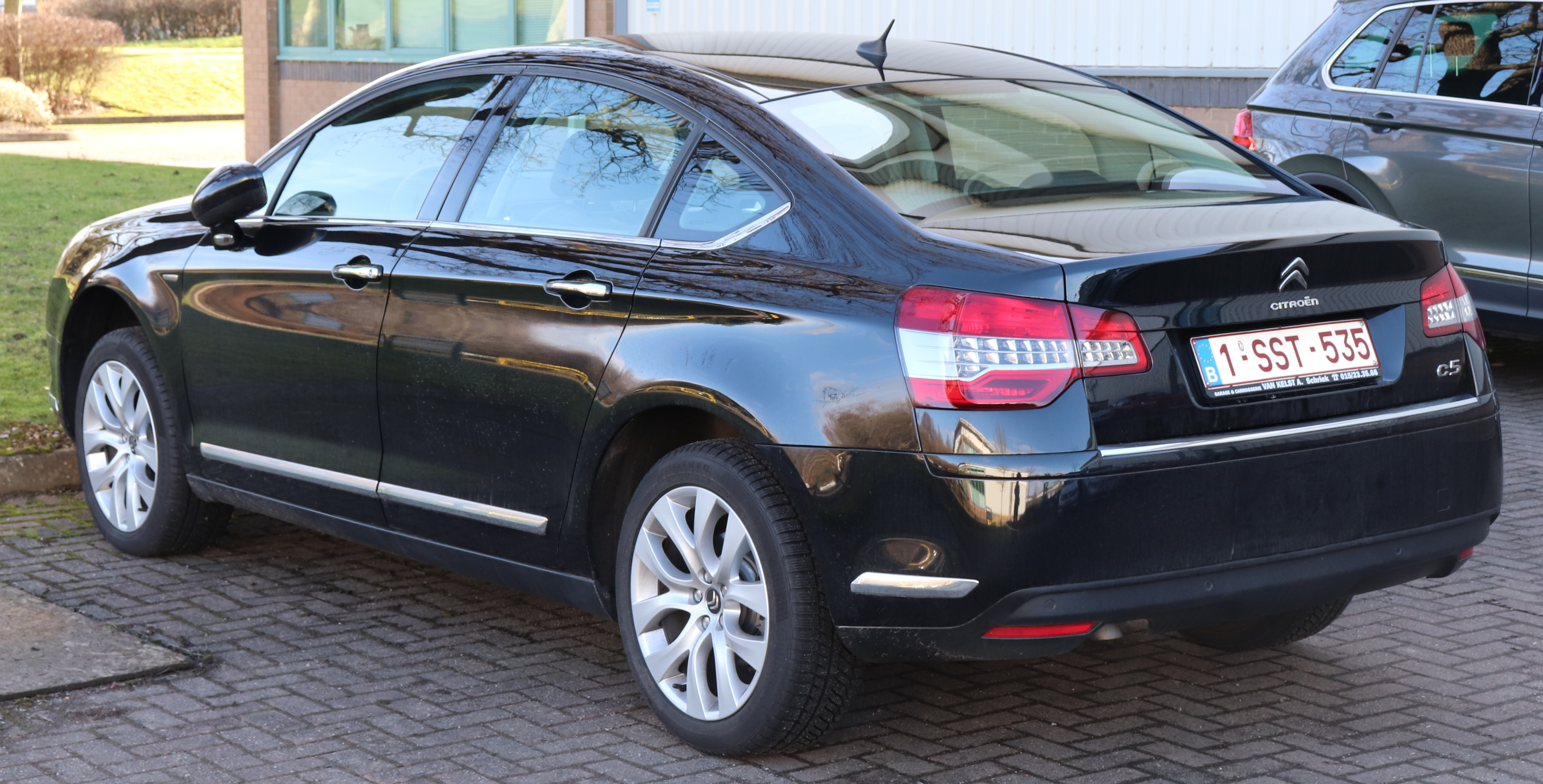
Saloon (facelift)

In July 2012, the C5 was given another mild facelift, with a few cosmetic changes, such as softer chevron badging, modified badging of C5, softer chevron "grille" as per the recently updated C4, and exclusive badges (on the Exclusive) on the sides in front of the front doors. For the Exclusive, the onboard GPS/radio head was also changed to the eMyWay unit which features full Bluetooth connectivity and iPod/USB interface. In July 2015, the lineup for the European-made C5 underwent a drastic reduction: all petrol-powered versions were discontinued, while all diesel versions were replaced by two, 2.0 BlueHDi options, with either 150 PS (110 kW) and manual transmission or 180 PS (132 kW) and an automatic. This was a response to market pressures; sales of petrol variants had been shrinking for years in this segment; in Italy, for instance, the petrol engines were all withdrawn in February 2013.

In May 2016, the C5 was officially withdrawn in the United Kingdom, due to disappointing sales of 17,105 since 2008. In 2015, only 237 cars were sold, the lowest number since the car's launch. This is in comparison to 6,549 sales in France in the same time span. However, this could be due to the model being launched at the start of the 2008 financial crisis, as well as increased demand for crossover models. This also marked the end of right-hand drive production of the C5.

Sharing the same underpinnings of the Citroën C6, which has since been discontinued, this generation of C5 is often referred to also as the "X7". It is observed that on these cars two technical entities, the hydropneumatic system and the double wishbone layout, are utilized in conjunction.

eTouch Comprising a package of services including the emergency and assistance calls, Citroën eTouch also proposes a virtual maintenance manual, and an Eco Driving service accessible via the MyCitroën personal area on the web. For calls, Citroën eTouch works completely independently.

The system is equipped with a GPS module, and a SIM card, with no need for a call plan and unlimited over time. The vehicles features two buttons, "SOS" for emergency calls (the call is also triggered automatically in the event of impact) and "Double Chevron" for assistance calls.

The emergency call gets emergency services to customers faster, for accident victims and bystanders alike. The two services are free and available at any time. In China, the C5 was heavily restyled in 2017, while in Europe, production officially ended. Since March 2017, the saloon became no longer free to order. However, the Tourer and the CrossTourer remained configurable.

=== 2017 facelift in China ===
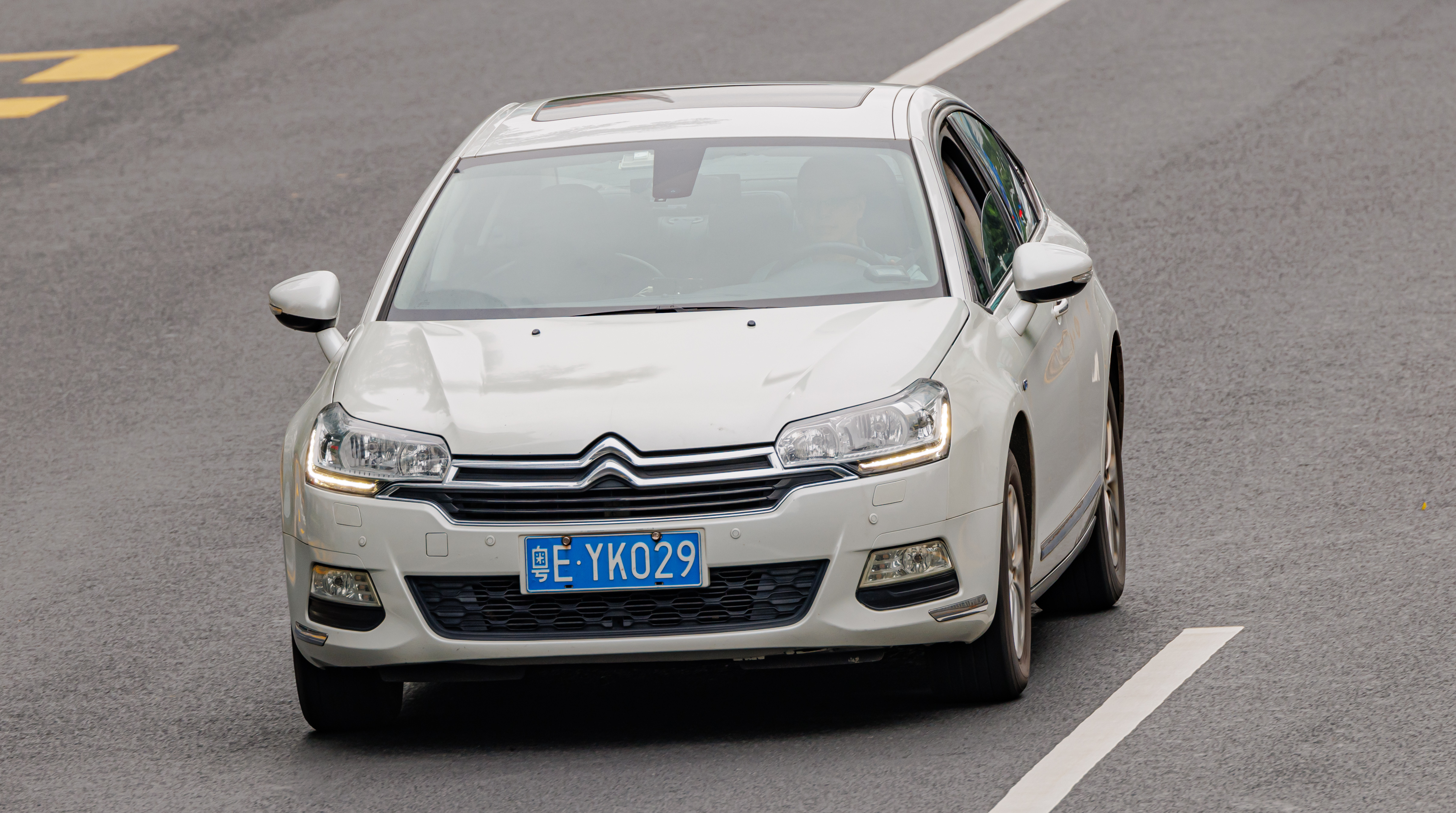
Citroën C5 (China; first facelift)

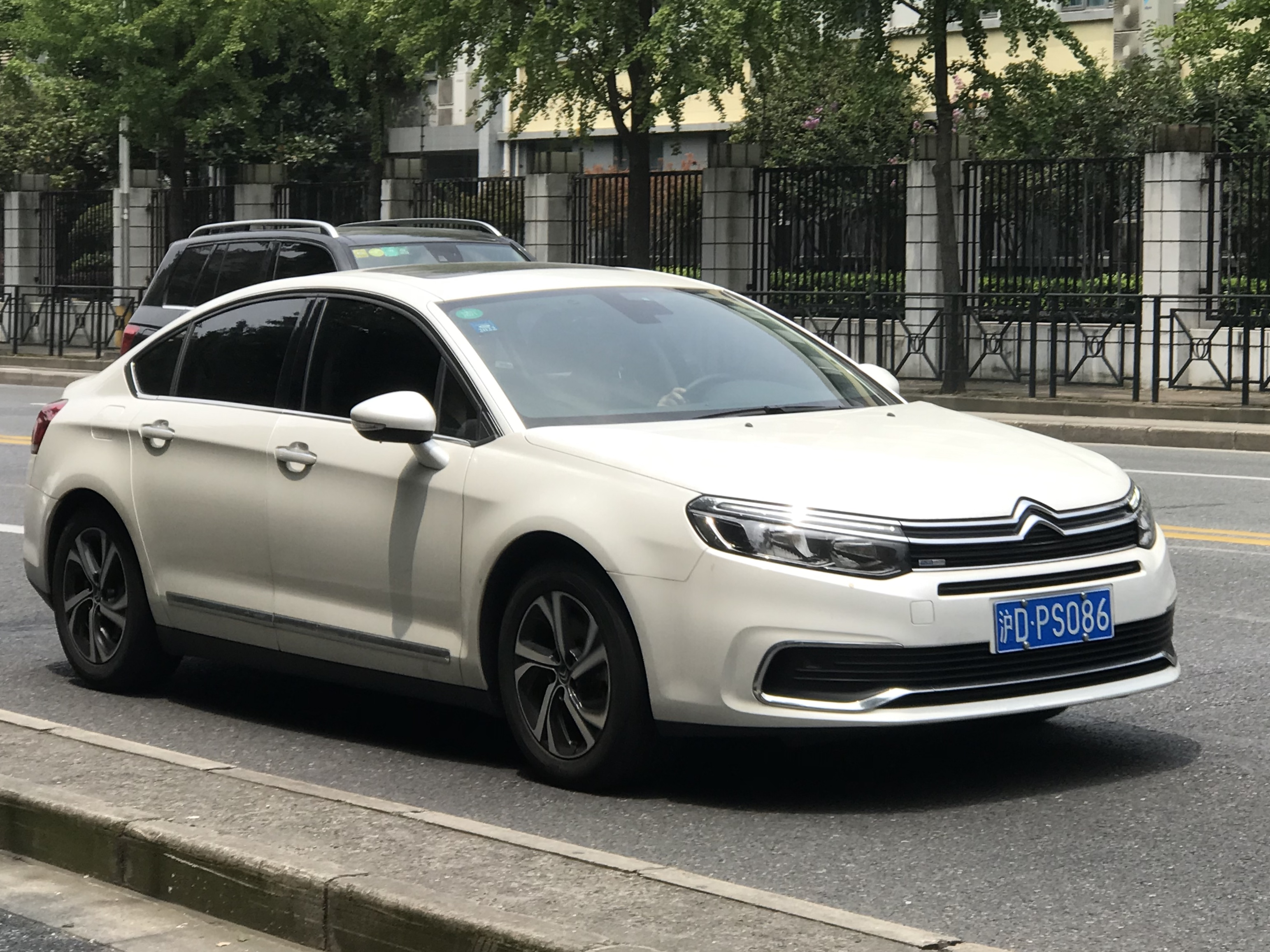

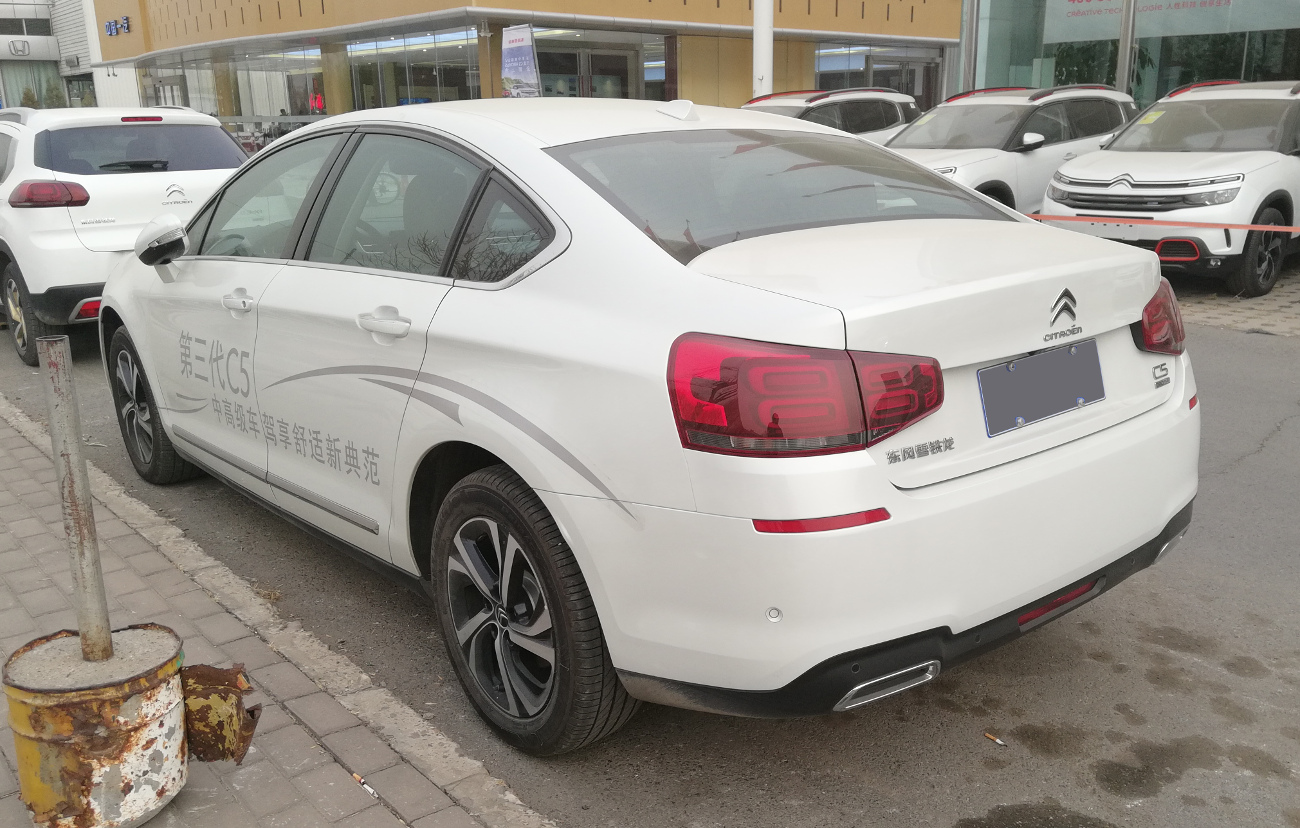
Citroën C5 2017 (China; second facelift)

The 2017 facelift for the second-generation C5 in China includes a redesign with the front end of the car completely redesigned, featuring new headlights, grilles, and bumper, and giving it an updated front face, and a slightly revised rear with new tail lamps. The 2017 facelift C5 model was powered by the same range of engines used in the pre-facelift model in China. Engine options include a 1.6-liter turbo gasoline engine with 167 PS (123 kW) and a bigger 1.8 turbo engine with 204 PS (150 kW) and 207 pound-feet (280 Newton meters) of torque. Both motors will be mated exclusively to a six-speed automatic transmission, powering to the front wheels. The Hydractive hydropneumatic suspension won’t be available for the 2017 C5 facelift as Citroën has decided to drop it from its portfolio due to the high production costs and low customer demand.

=== Engines ===
Model	Engine	Displacement	Power	Top speed	0–62 mph (0–100 km/h) (s)	Economy (liters/100 km)	CO2 emissions (g/km)	Years
1.6 VTi	EP6	1598 cc	88 kW (120 PS; 118 hp)	198 km/h (123 mph)	12.2	6.2	144	2010.07-2015.06
1.6 THP	EP6DT	1598 cc	115 kW (156 PS; 154 hp)	210 km/h (130 mph)	8.6	6.69	153	2009.04-2015.06
1.8 16v	EW7J4	1749 cc	92 kW (125 PS; 123 hp)	200 km/h (124 mph)	11.0	6.57	188	2008.02-2010.06
2.0 16v	EW10A	1997 cc	103 kW (140 PS; 138 hp)	210 km/h (130 mph)	9.7	7.00	198	2008.02-2009.08
2.3 16v (China)		2253 cc	127 kW (172 PS; 170 hp)	218 km/h (135 mph)	9.9	12.8	299	2010-2017
3.0 V6 24v	ES9/A	2946 cc	155 kW (211 PS; 208 hp)	224 km/h (139 mph)	9.2	10.50	248	2008.02-2009.08
1.6 HDi	DV6TED4	1560 cc	80 kW (109 PS; 108 hp)	191 km/h (119 mph)	12.2	5.6	149	2008.02-2010.06
1.6 HDi	DV6C	1560 cc	82 kW (112 PS; 110 hp)	190 km/h (118 mph)	13.4	5.0 e-HDi: 4.8	129 e-HDi: 125	2010.07-2012.07
1.6 HDi	DV6C	1560 cc	84 kW (114 PS; 112 hp)	190 km/h (118 mph)	13.4	4.5 e-HDi: 4.3	120 e-HDi: 111	2012.06-2014.12
2.0 HDi	DW10 TED4	1997 cc	100 kW (136 PS; 134 hp)	204 km/h (127 mph)	10.6	6.0	157	2008.02-2009.08
2.0 HDi	DW10 TED4	1997 cc	103 kW (140 PS; 138 hp)	205 km/h (127 mph)	10.6	5.8	111	2008.11-2015.06
2.0 HDi	DW10C	1997 cc	120 kW (163 PS; 161 hp)	210 km/h (130 mph)	9.9	5.3	139	2009.09-2015.06
2.0 BlueHDi	DW10D	1997 cc	110 kW (150 PS; 148 hp)	214 km/h (133 mph)	9.4	4.1	106	2015.07-2017.05
2.0 BlueHDi	DW10FC	1997 cc	132 kW (180 PS; 178 hp)	222 km/h (138 mph)	8.7	4.4	114	2015.07-2017.05
2.2 HDi	DW12 TED4	2179 cc	125 kW (170 PS; 168 hp)	219 km/h (136 mph)	9.2	6.5	172	2008.02-2009.08
2.2 HDi	DW12 TED4	2179 cc	150 kW (204 PS; 201 hp)	230 km/h (143 mph)	8.3	6.1	159	2010.07-2015.06
2.7 HDi V6	DT17 TED4	2720 cc	150 kW (204 PS; 201 hp)	224 km/h (139 mph)	8.9	8.4	225	2008.02-2009.08
3.0 HDi V6	DT20C	2993 cc	177 kW (240 PS; 237 hp)	243 km/h (151 mph)	7.9	7.2	189	2009.09-2012.05

=== Safety ===
ANCAP test results Citroen C5 variant(s) as tested (2008)
Test	Score
Overall	5 /5 stars
Frontal offset	14.58/16
Side impact	16/16
Pole	2/2
Seat belt reminders	2/3
Whiplash protection	Not Assessed
Pedestrian protection	Marginal
Electronic stability control	Standard

== Successor ==
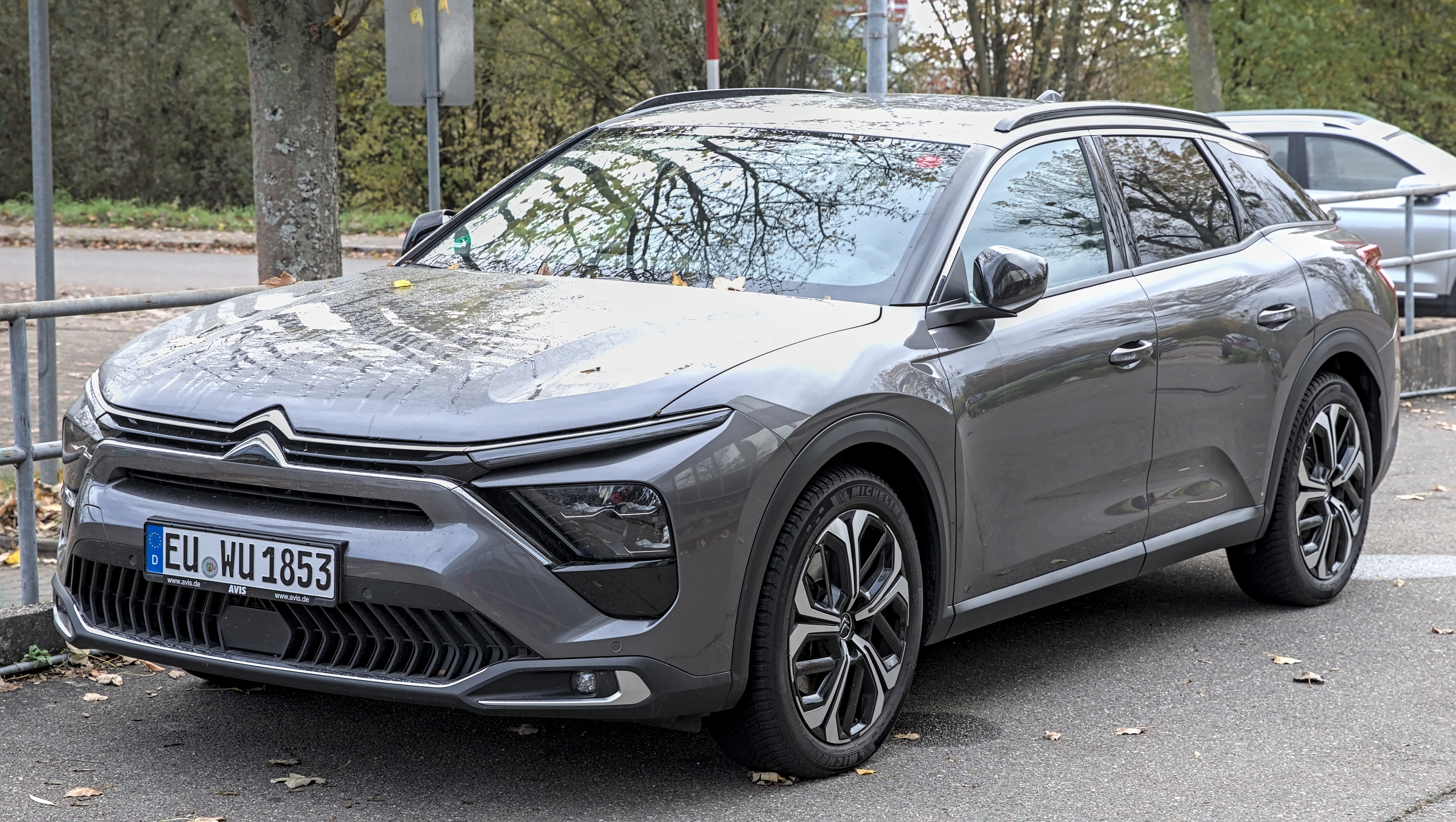
Citroën C5 X

The new C5 X was revealed in the United Kingdom in July 2022. It will be sold in various markets, such as Australia and Europe. It uses the C5 nameplate, but is now a larger mid-size crossover SUV.

== Sales and production ==
Year	Worldwide production	Worldwide sales	Notes
2000		99	
2001		109,657	
2002		145,731	
2003		105,299	
2004		89,437	
2005		84,506	
2006		65,640	
2007		46,853	
2008		71,187	
2009		87,600	
2010		116,000	
2011	100,457	101,213	Total production reaches 1,120,615 units.
2012	72,500	76,300	Total production reaches 1,193,100 units.
2013		63,862	
2014		51,936	
2015		35,179	
2016		14,506	
2017		13,262	
2018		5,221	
2019		729	
2020		25	
2021		14,215	
