= Peugeot 408 (crossover) =

Compact crossover SUV

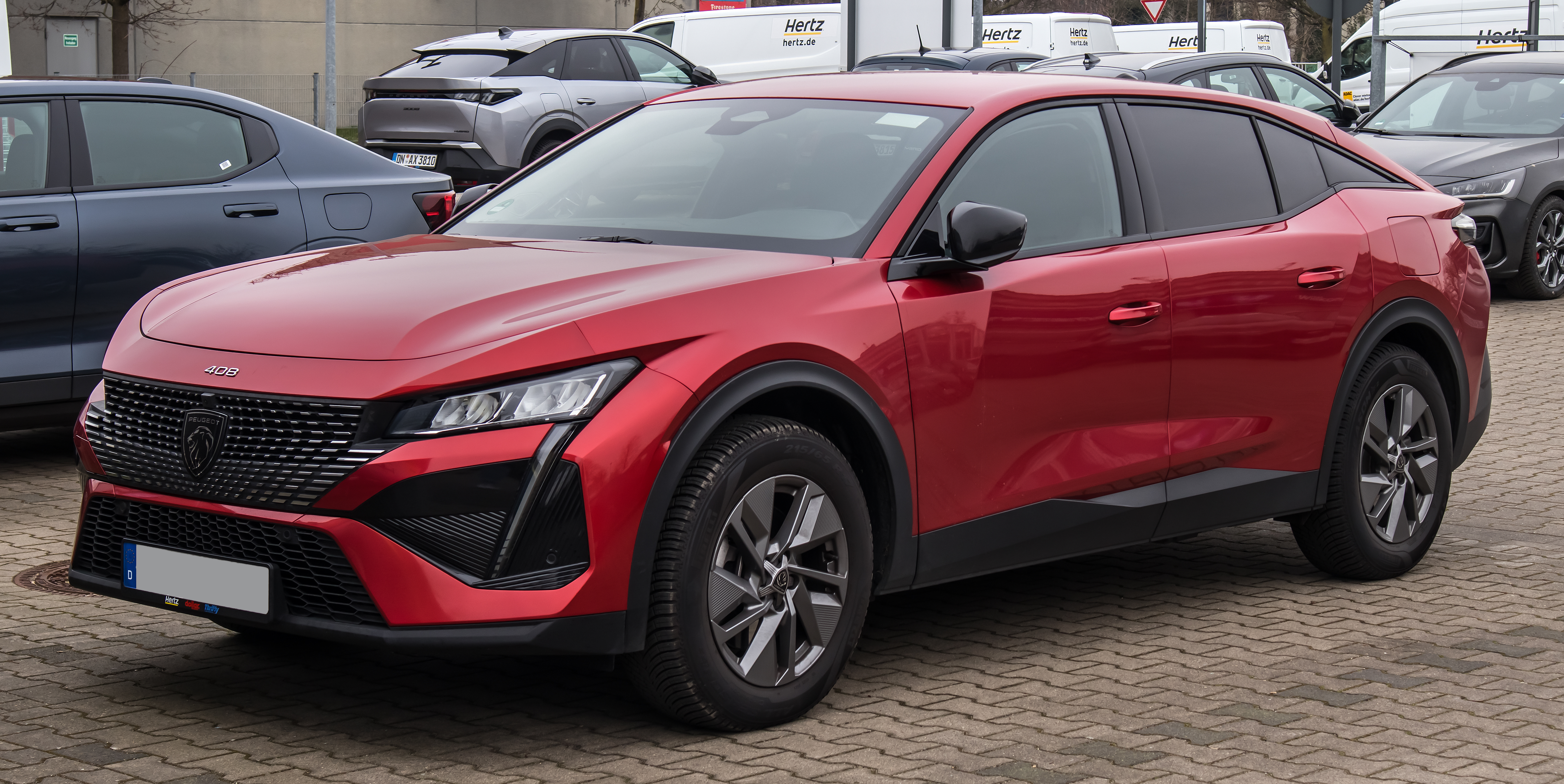

Overview
- Manufacturer: Peugeot (Stellantis)
- Model code: P54
- Also called: Peugeot 408 X (China)
- Production: 2022–present
- Assembly: France: Mulhouse (Mulhouse Plant); China: Chengdu (Dongfeng Peugeot-Citroën); Malaysia: Gurun, Kedah (Stellantis Malaysia)
- Designer: Kevin Gonçalves

Body and chassis
- Class: Compact crossover SUV (C)
- Body style: 5-door liftback
- Layout: Front-engine, front-wheel-drive
- Platform: EMP2
- Related: Peugeot 308 III; Citroën C5 X; Opel Astra L

Powertrain
- Engine: Petrol: 1.2 L EB2ADTD/DTS turbo I3; 1.6 L EP6FDT/EP6FDTX turbo I4; Petrol plug-in hybrid: 1.6 L EP6FDT I4
- Electric motor: 81 kW (109 hp; 110 PS) (PHEV)
- Power output: 130 PS (128 hp; 96 kW) (1.2); 180 PS (178 hp; 132 kW) (1.6 PHEV 180); 218 PS (215 hp; 160 kW) (1.6 GT 218); 225 PS (222 hp; 165 kW) (1.6 PHEV 225)
- Transmission: 8-speed EAT8 automatic
- Hybrid drivetrain: Plug-in hybrid (PHEV)
- Battery: 12.4 kWh lithium-ion (PHEV)

Dimensions
- Wheelbase: 2,787 mm (109.7 in)
- Length: 4,687 mm (184.5 in)
- Width: 1,848 mm (72.8 in)
- Height: 1,478–1,487 mm (58.2–58.5 in)
- Kerb weight: 1,393–1,706 kg (3,071–3,761 lb)

The Peugeot 408 (also marketed as Peugeot 408 X in China) is a crossover SUV produced by French automaker Peugeot. It was unveiled in June 2022 as a C-segment vehicle slotting between the 308 and 3008 or 508. It was publicly exhibited for the first time at the 2022 Paris Motor Show. It is based on the EMP2 platform closely shared with the third-generation 308, and despite sharing the saloon silhouettes, mechanically unrelated to the Chinese market 408 saloon (which itself was based on the previous-generation 308). According to Peugeot, the 408 is a blend between SUVs, hatchbacks and saloons, and has been described as a coupe crossover.

== Overview ==
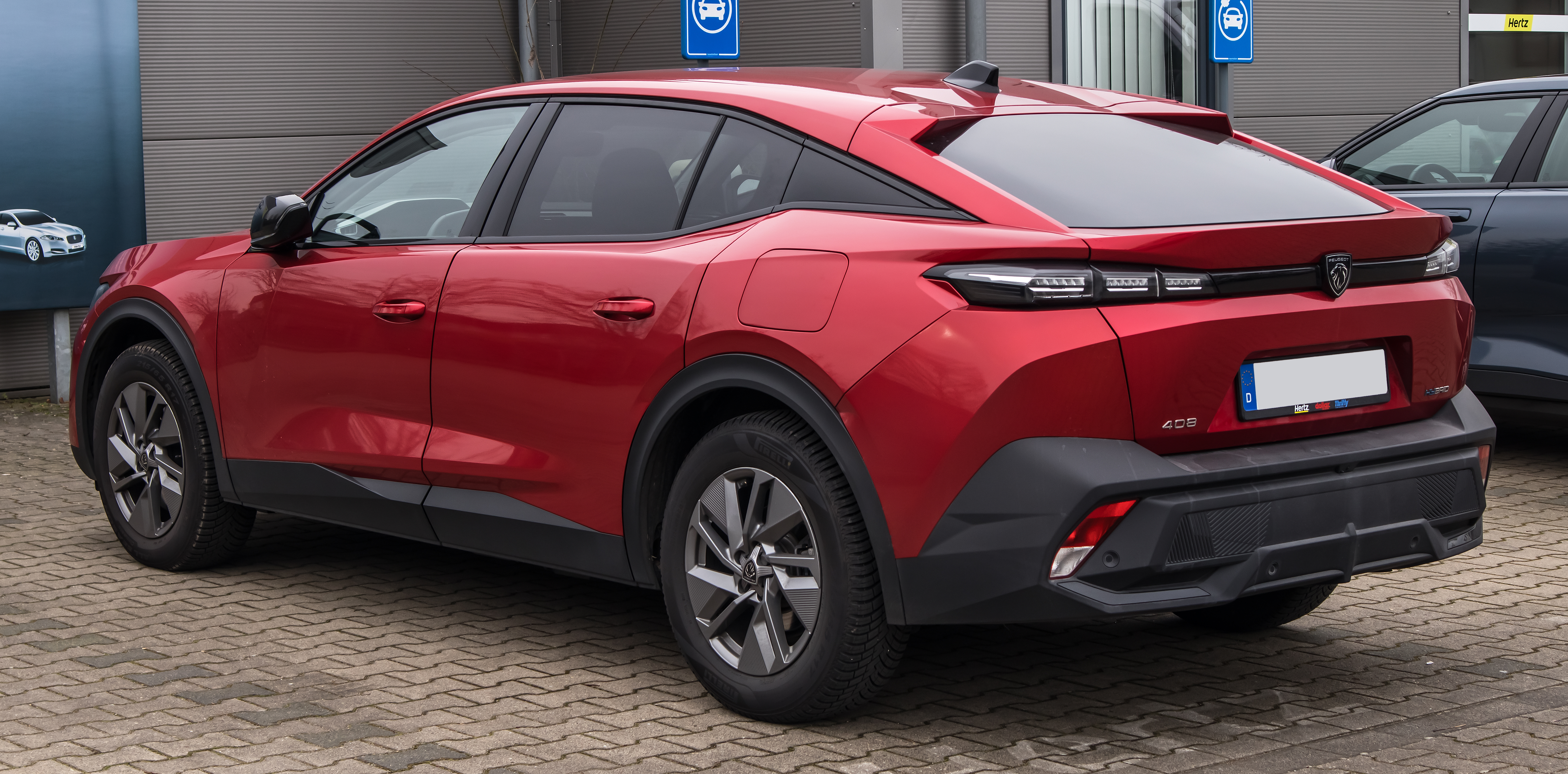
Rear view

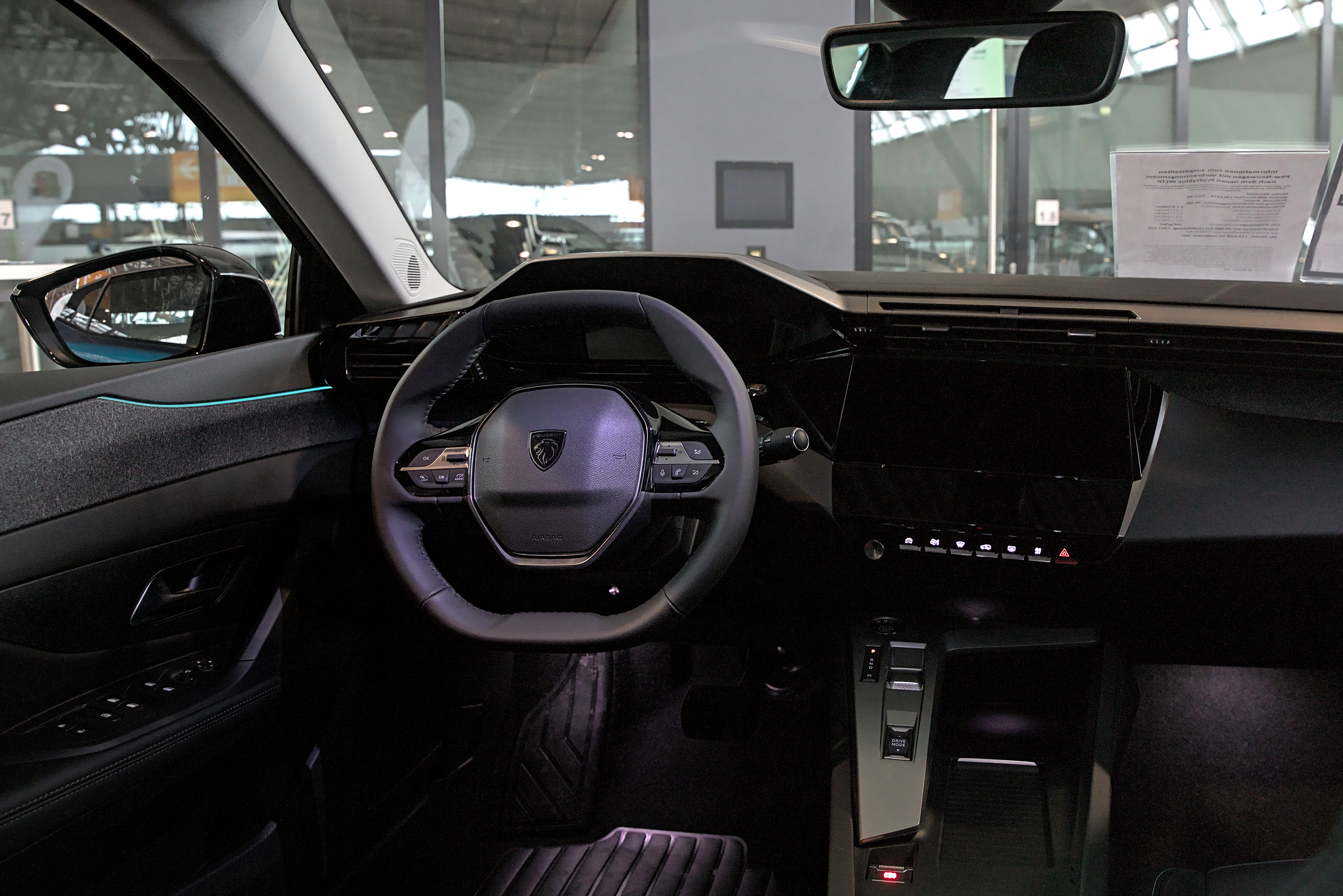
Interior

Development of the vehicle by PSA Group took seven years due to its radical concept, and was led by project manager Aurélie Bresson. The vehicle was codenamed as the P54 during development. The design was inspired from an internal concept car that Peugeot had worked on, which was known as the "2015 Advanced Design manifesto". Its design concept was also featured by the Citroën C5 X, which shares the same platform (long-wheelbase EMP2 V3) and height with the 408. Due to its body shape, the 408 achieves a low coefficient of drag of 0.28, on par with traditional saloons. The 408 also shared the same headlights, taillights, and dashboard design as the third-generation 308, which was developed alongside it.

Three powertrain options similar to the 308 will be offered, which are two options of plug-in hybrid petrol with total output of 180 PS (178 hp; 132 kW) and 225 PS (222 hp; 165 kW), and a base 130 PS (128 hp; 96 kW) 1.2-litre turbocharged three-cylinder PureTech petrol engine. All models are mated to an 8-speed automatic gearbox. The petrol engine will be replaced with a mild hybrid unit in late 2023 and a battery electric model called the e-408 will follow.

The 408 is produced in Mulhouse, France since 2022 and Chengdu, China since January 2023. In the Chinese market, the model is sold as the 408 X to differentiate it with the older saloon model.

The dichroic paintwork of the 2017 Peugeot Instinct concept inspired that of the 408.

Since 2024, Peugeot assembles SKD 408s in its Malaysian plant, in Kedah. These vehicles are sold in this country, but also exported in other countries of the region such as Thailand (from 2024), Cambodia (from 2025) and Taiwan (from 2026).

=== 408 First Edition ===
Peugeot's UK division launched a limited edition of 50 units named First Edition, based on the GT trim.

=== Facelift (2026) ===
On 9 January 2026, Peugeot unveiled a facelifted 408 featuring a redesigned grille and bumper, a three-claw LED lighting signature, illuminated front and rear branding, and a revised powertrain range comprising mild-hybrid, plug-in-hybrid, and fully electric E-408 versions.

Front

Rear

== Powertrain ==
The 408 is only available with an automatic gearbox, with no manual options.

Outside Europe, the 408 is also offered with a 215 hp (160 kW) THP petrol engine.

A battery electric version has been officially announced for 2024.

Petrol engines
Model	1.2 PureTech	1.6 PureTech Hybrid		1.6 Puretech THP 215
Engine layout	3-cylinder	4-cylinder + electric motor		4-cylinder
Type	Direct injection turbocharged			
Displacement	1199 cc	1598 cc		
Power	130 PS (96 kW; 128 hp) at 5500 rpm	Thermic: 150 PS (110 kW; 148 hp); Electric: 110 PS (81 kW; 108 hp) at 2500 rpm Combined: 180 PS (132 kW; 178 hp)	Thermic: 180 PS (132 kW; 178 hp); Electric: 110 PS (81 kW; 108 hp) at 2500 rpm Combined: 225 PS (165 kW; 222 hp)	215 PS (158 kW; 212 hp)
Torque	230 N⋅m (170 lb⋅ft) at 1750 rpm	Thermic: 250 N⋅m (184 lb⋅ft) at 1750 rpm Electric: 320 N⋅m (236 lb⋅ft) at 500 - 2500 rpm Combined: 360 N⋅m (266 lb⋅ft)		300 N⋅m (221 lb⋅ft) at 1750 rpm
Transmission	8-speed automatic (EAT8)	8-speed automatic (e-EAT8)		
Notes	Euro 6d			Intended for markets outside Europe

== Sales ==
Year	Europe (Note: Europe: 2020 EU 27 + UK + Switzerland + Norway + Iceland)	Turkey	Egypt	Malaysia	Taiwan	China
2022	1,047			/	/	
2023		9,729		/	/	1,597
2024		11,986	701	486	/	2,463
2025		15,035	703	442	1,627	529

== Safety ==
ANCAP test results Peugeot 408 all variant (2022, aligned with Euro NCAP)
Test	Points	%
Overall:	5 /5 stars	
Adult occupant:	30.09	79%
Child occupant:	42.20	86%
Pedestrian:	42.19	78%
Safety assist:	13.27	82%
