= Ford Versailles (France) =

Automobile model

The Ford Versailles name was used for an automobile between 1954 and 1957 in France.

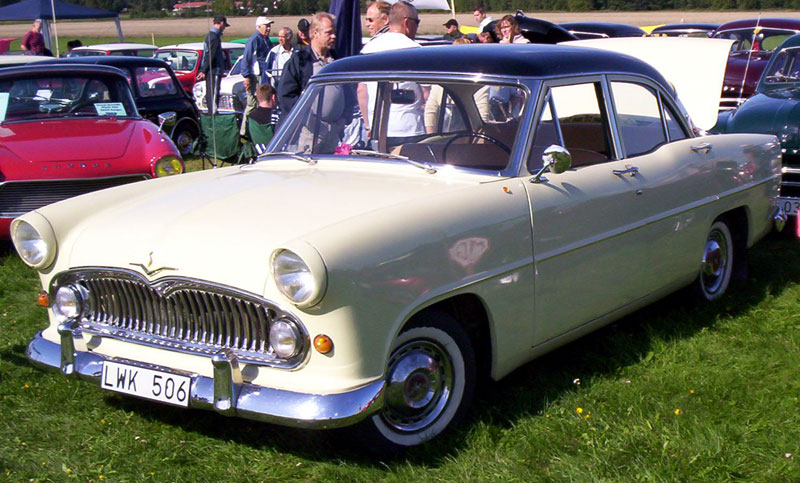
1957 Ford Vedette Versailles

The former Ford SAF plant in Poissy, acquired by Simca in 1954, manufactured a large car called the Simca Vedette. This was a descendant of the late 1940s/early 1950s Ford Vedette, and was also marketed as Ford Vedette in the Netherlands, Germany and Sweden until 1957. It was available in four versions, each of which was also marketed with a separate model name — Trianon, Versailles, Régence and Marly — hence the "Ford Versailles" appearing in some markets.

== See also ==
- Ford Versailles (Brazil)
