= Peugeot 308 =

Range of small family cars by Peugeot (compact car)

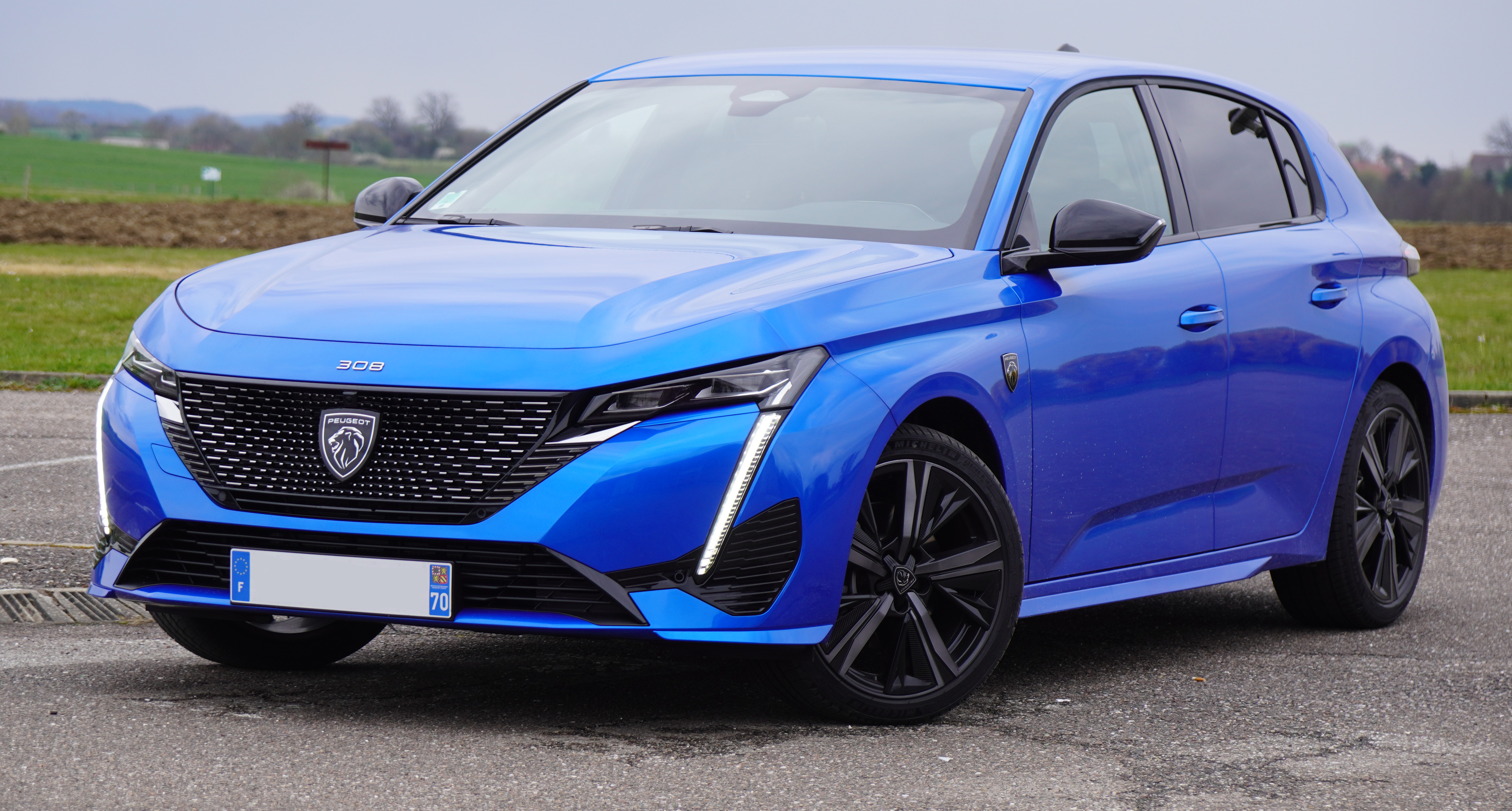

Overview
- Manufacturer: Peugeot (Note: PSA Group (2007–2021); Stellantis (2021–present))
- Production: 2007–present

Body and chassis
- Class: Small family car (C)

Chronology
- Predecessor: Peugeot 307

The Peugeot 308 is a small family car (C-segment) produced by French automobile manufacturer Peugeot. It was unveiled in June 2007, and launched in September 2007 in hatchback form, which was followed by station wagon (the 308 SW) in March 2008, coupé cabriolet (the 308 CC) in February 2009, and a saloon/sedan version (the 408) in February 2010. The 308 replaced the 307, and is positioned below the 508 and above the 208.

The first generation was largely based on its predecessor, the 307, and utilized modified versions of that car's drivetrain and chassis. The second-generation model was unveiled in 2013, and it was awarded as the 2014 European Car of the Year. The third-generation model was unveiled in 2021 and introduced a hybrid powertrain.

== First generation (T7; 2007) ==
Peugeot 308 I
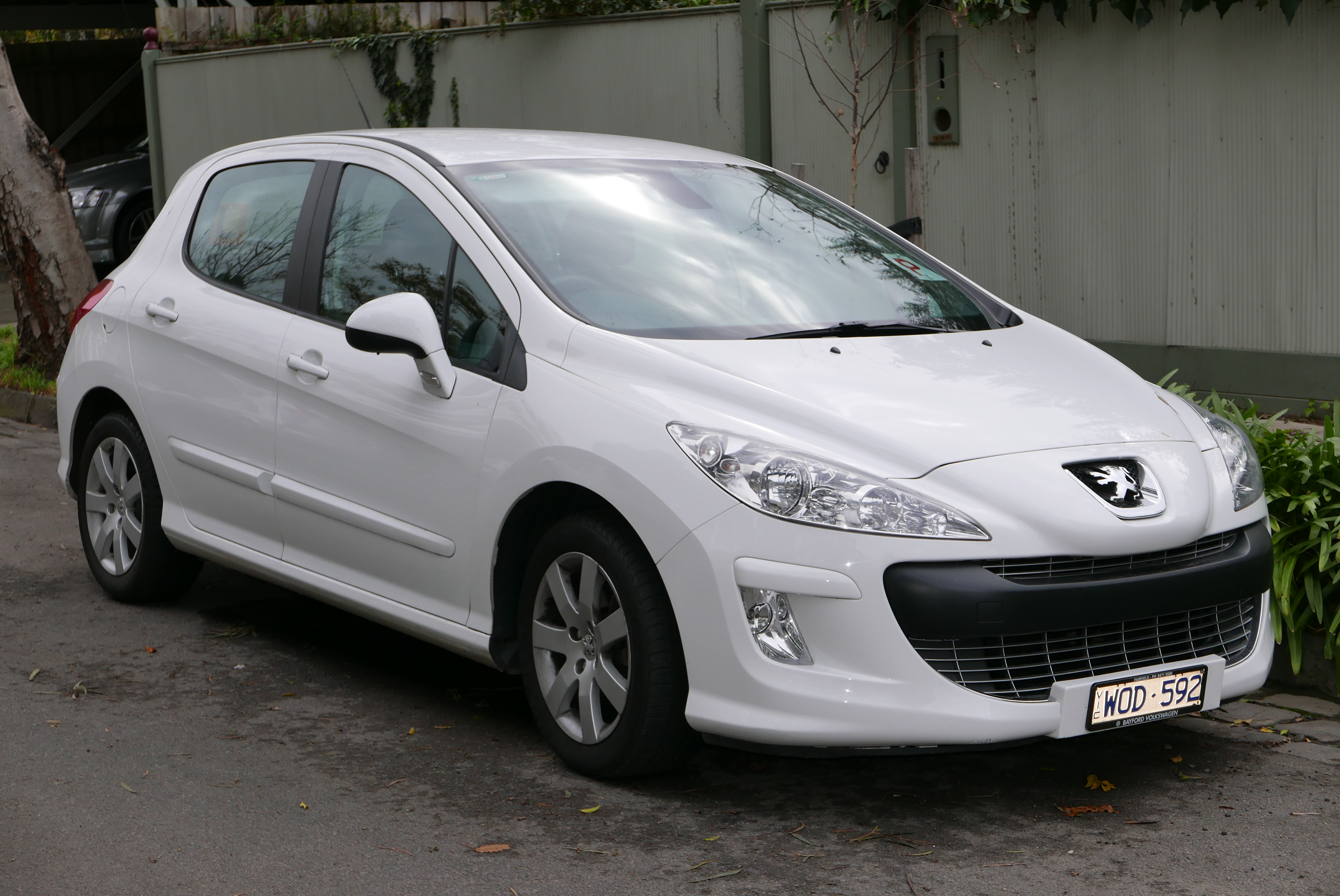

Overview
- Model code: T7
- Production: October 2007–2013; 2011–2016 (China); 2011–2021 (Argentina)
- Assembly: France: Mulhouse (Mulhouse Plant); Sochaux (Sochaux Plant); Argentina: El Palomar (PSA Argentina); China: Wuhan (DPCA); Malaysia: Gurun (NAM); Russia: Kaluga (PCMA Rus)
- Designer: Stéphan Peureux

Body and chassis
- Body style: 3-door hatchback 5-door hatchback 5-door station wagon/estate 2-door coupé cabriolet 4-door sedan
- Layout: Front-engine, front-wheel-drive or four-wheel-drive
- Platform: PSA PF2 platform
- Related: Peugeot 307; Peugeot 408; Peugeot 3008; Peugeot 5008; Peugeot RCZ; Peugeot Partner; Citroën C4; Citroën C4 Picasso; Citroën DS4; Citroën Berlingo

Powertrain
- Engine: Petrol: 1.4 L EP3 VTi I4; 1.6 L EP6 VTi I4; 1.6 L EP6DT THP Turbo I4; Diesel: 1.6 L DV6ATED4/DV6TED4 HDi I4; 1.6 L DV6C e-HDi I4; 2.0 L DW10B HDi I4
- Electric motor: 2x BSG e-Boosters
- Transmission: 5/6-speed manual 4-speed ZF 4HP automatic 6-speed Aisin AWTF-80 SC automatic 6-speed Auto6R
- Hybrid drivetrain: μHEV (308 e-HDi)

Dimensions
- Wheelbase: 2,608 mm (102.7 in); 2,708 mm (106.6 in) (SW); 2,605 mm (102.6 in) (CC)
- Length: 4,276 mm (168.3 in); 4,500 mm (177.2 in) (SW); 4,440 mm (174.8 in) (CC); 4,558 mm (179.4 in) (Saloon)
- Width: 1,815 mm (71.5 in); 1,805 mm (71.1 in) (Saloon)
- Height: 1,498 mm (59.0 in); 1,566 mm (61.7 in) (SW); 1,505 mm (59.3 in) (Saloon); 1,426 mm (56.1 in) (CC)

=== Design ===
Launched as the replacement for the Peugeot 307 in most international markets, the new vehicle was based upon the old 307's chassis, but has new bodywork and is slightly longer and wider. Developed under the project code "Project T7", its coefficient of drag is 0.29, and it has a five-star rating on Euro NCAP. Following the facelift of March 2011, the drag factor was reduced to 0.28.

During its production, the 308 HDi held the Guinness world record of the most fuel efficient mainstream car, having averaged 3.13 litres per 100 kilometres (90 mpg_{‑imp}; 75 mpg_{‑US}) over a distance of 14,580 km (9,060 mi), but Peugeot ran foul of British advertising rules by referencing a fuel consumption of 126 mpg_{‑imp} (2.24 L/100 km; 105 mpg_{‑US}) in an advert for the car.

The 308 is manufactured in France at the Mulhouse and Sochaux factories. It is also manufactured in Kaluga, Russia, for the local market, since 2010, and El Palomar, Argentina, for the South American market since 2011.

The car attracted minor criticism in right-hand drive markets as the windscreen wiper mechanism was unchanged from the design for left-hand drive vehicles, meaning a large unwiped area was present at the top of the windscreen on the driver's side, but was absent on the passenger side, as the driver's side wiper was shorter, and the passenger wiper "went up" first.

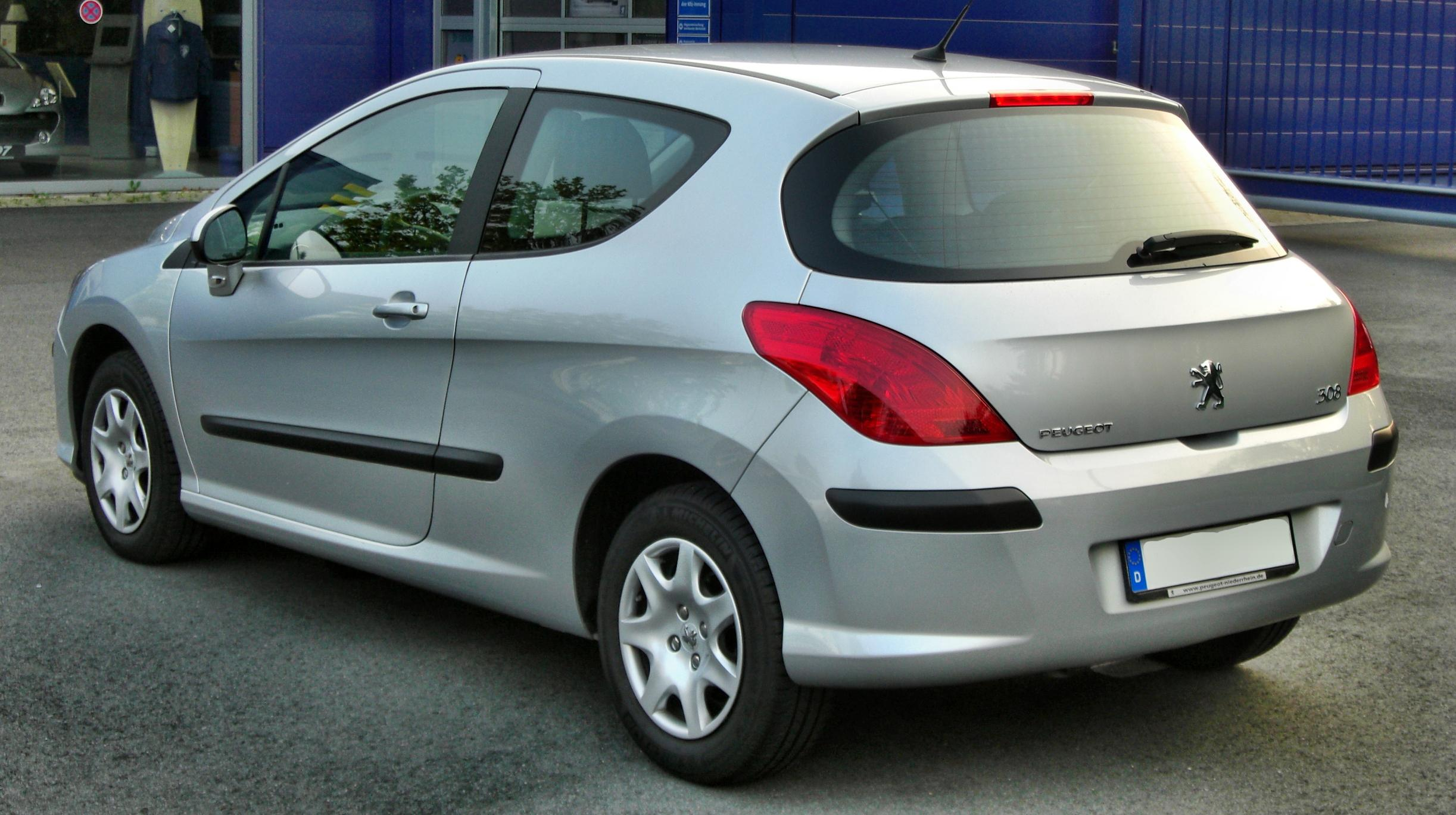
Peugeot 308 (three-door)

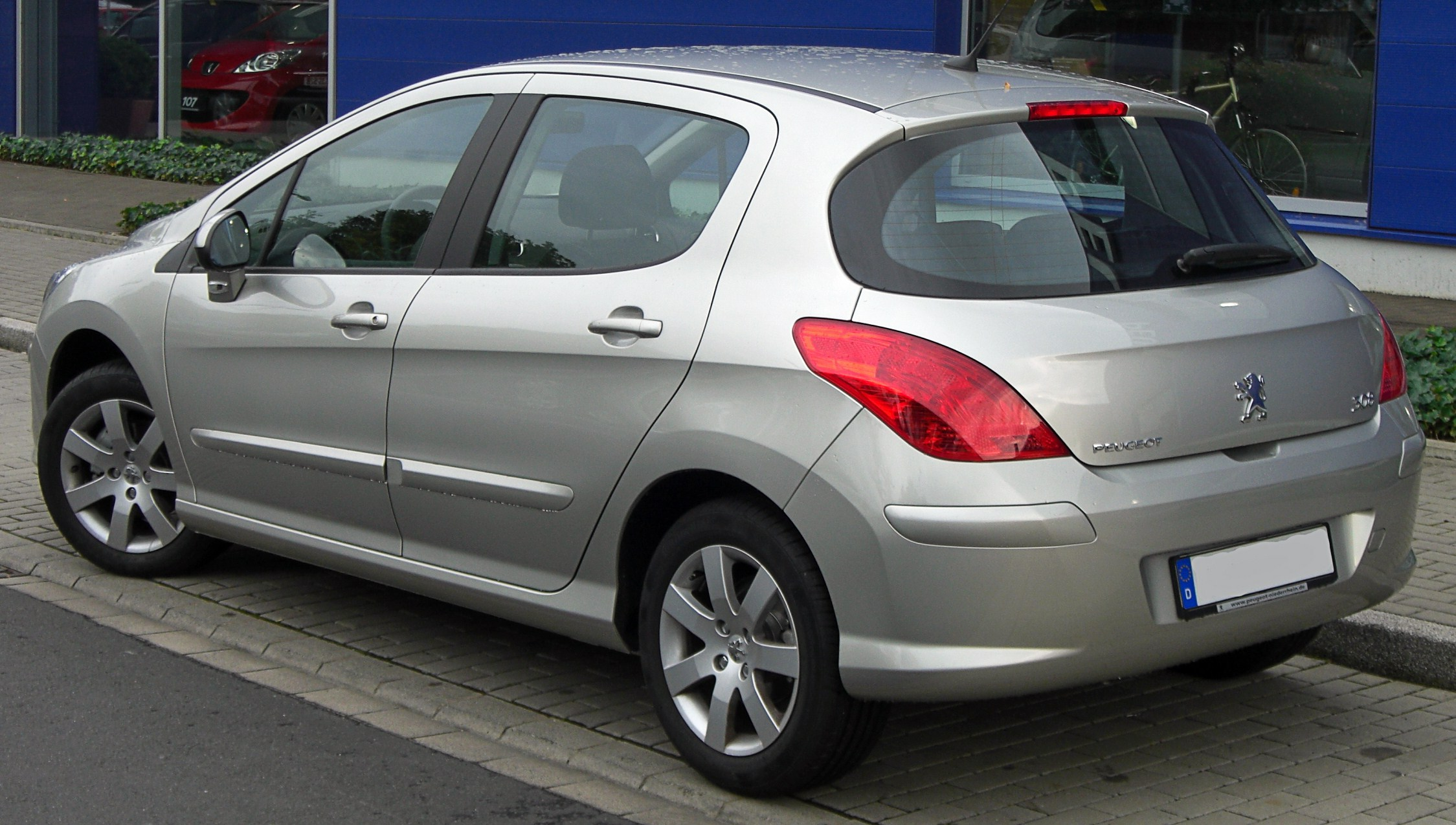
Peugeot 308 (five-door)

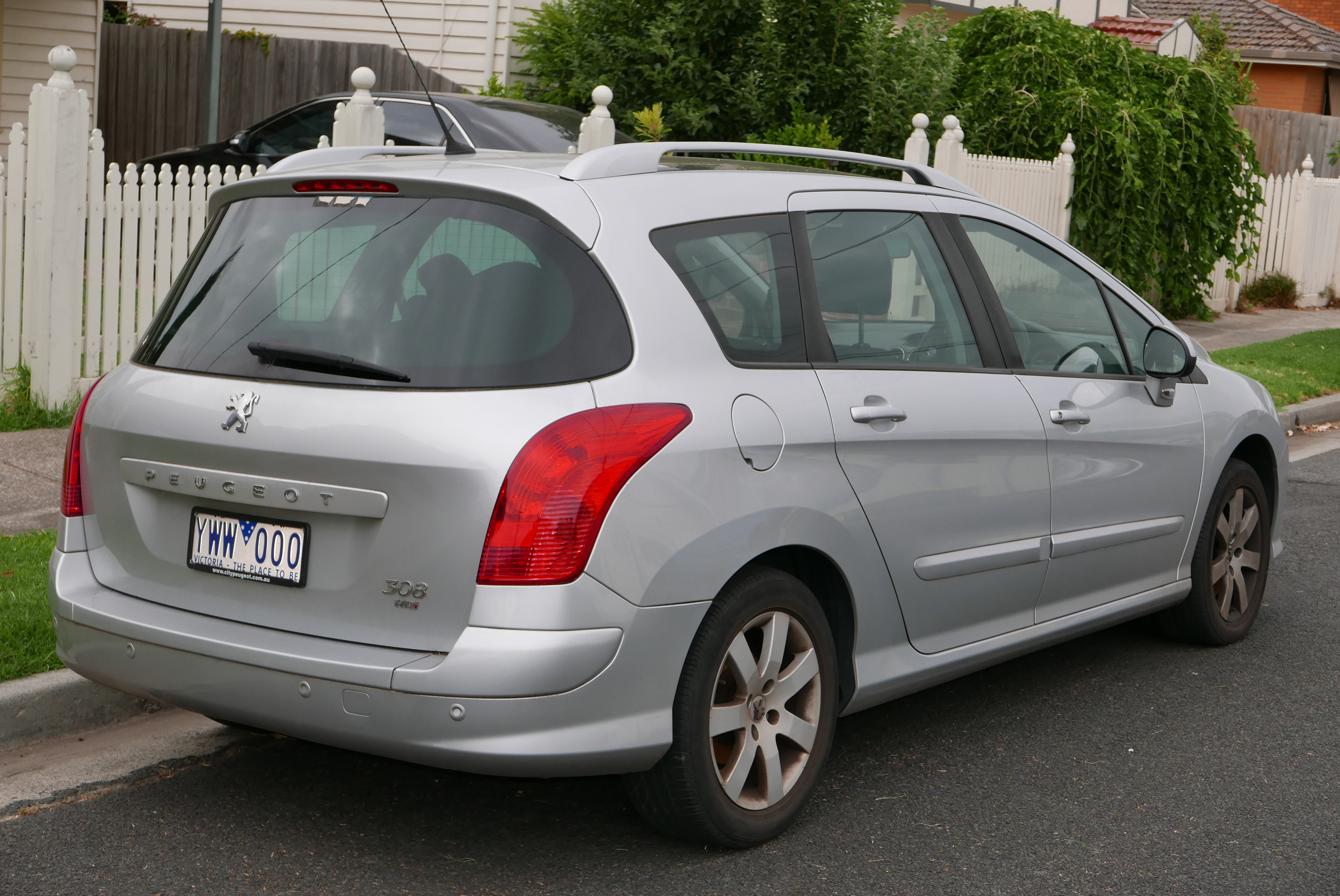
Peugeot 308 SW (308 Touring in Australia)

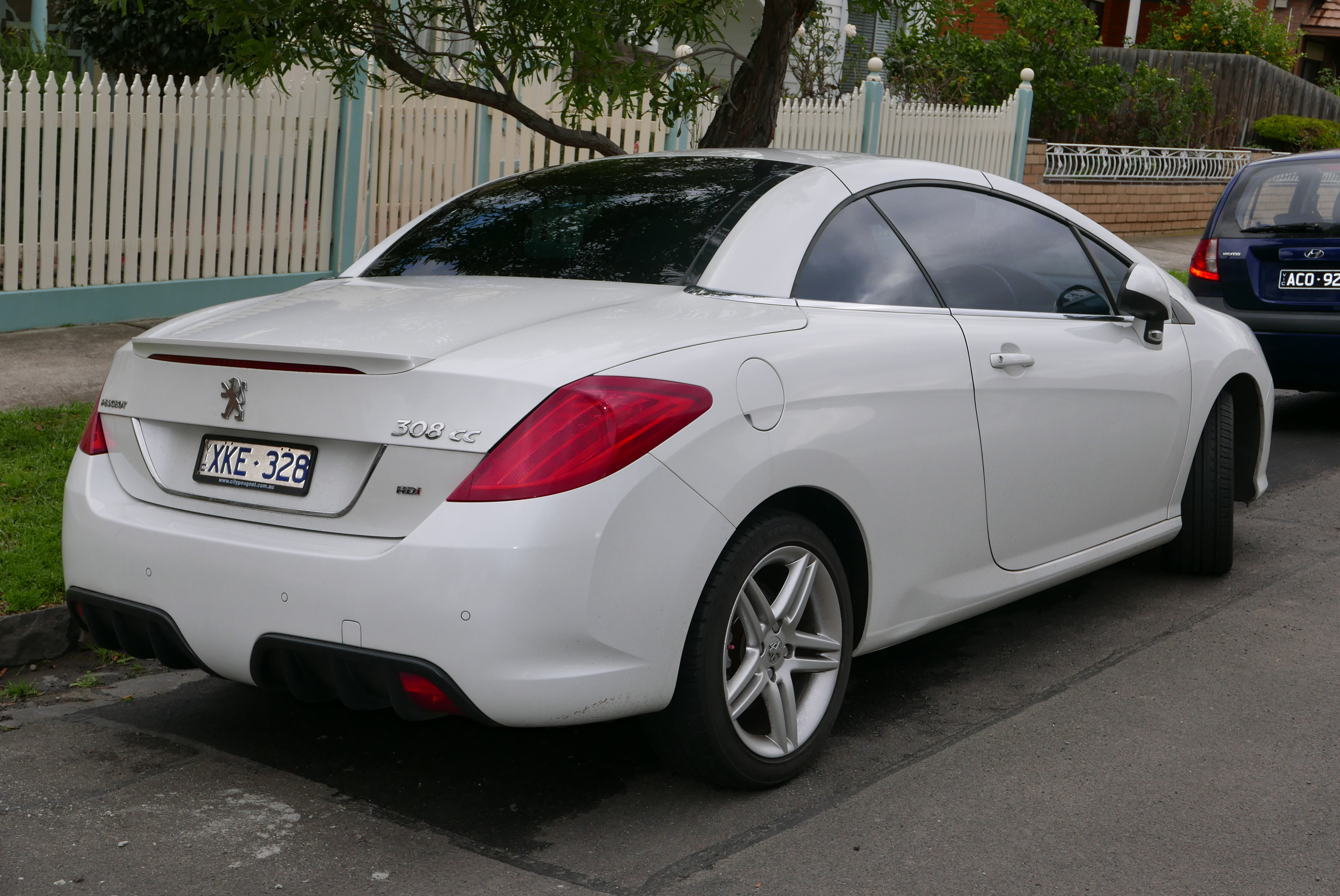
Peugeot 308 CC

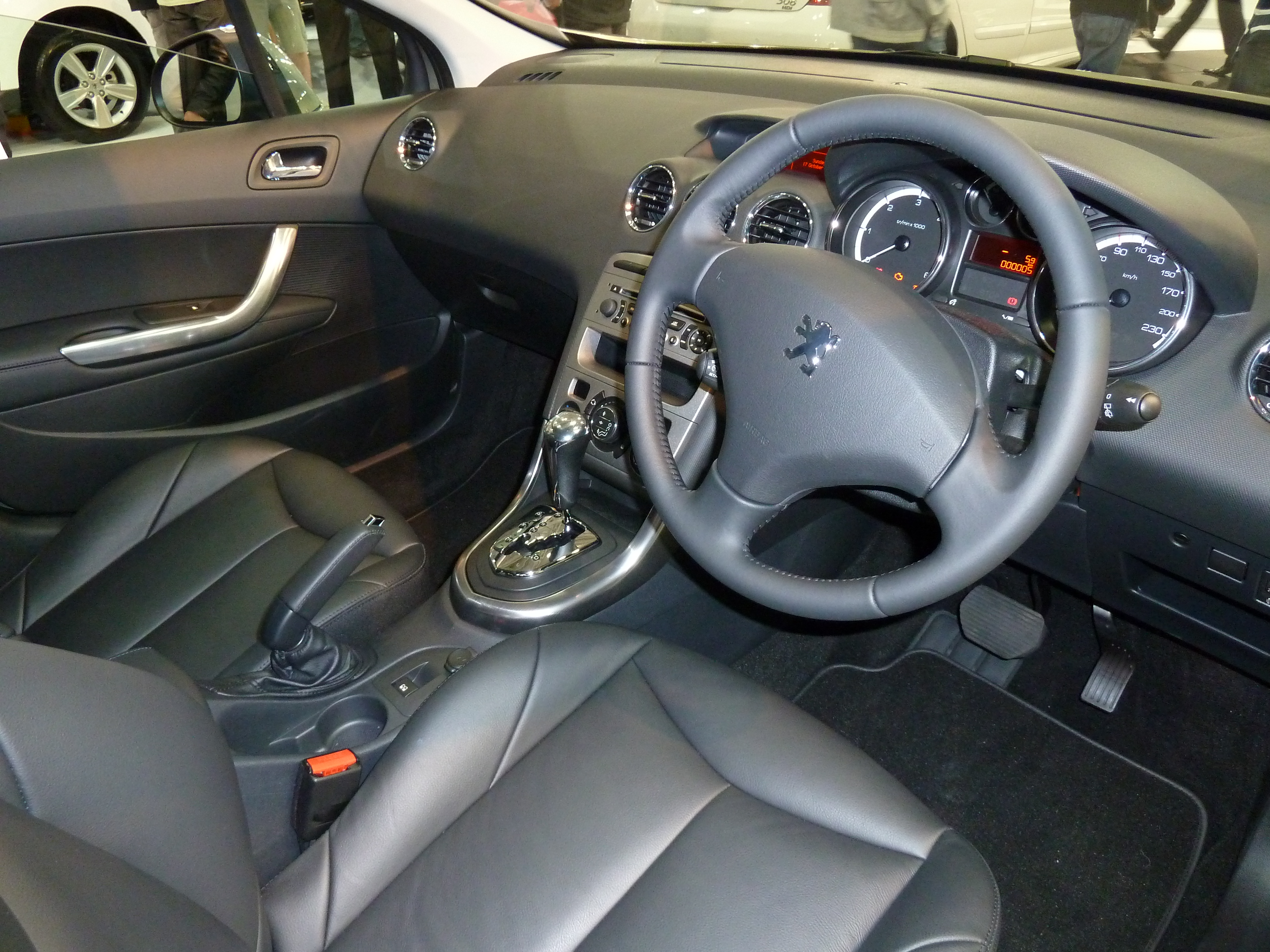
Interior (2010 Peugeot 308 XSE)

=== Body styles ===
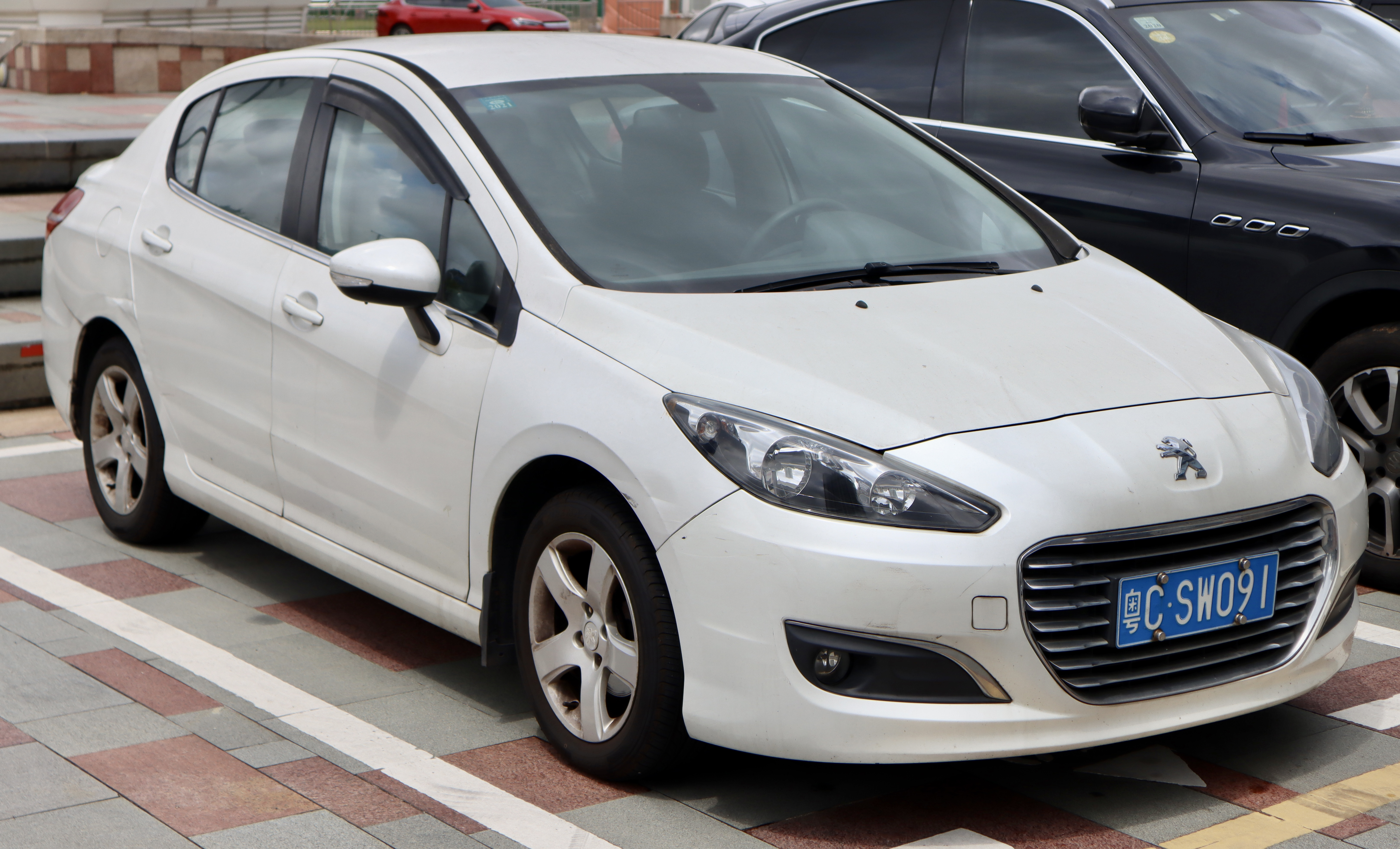

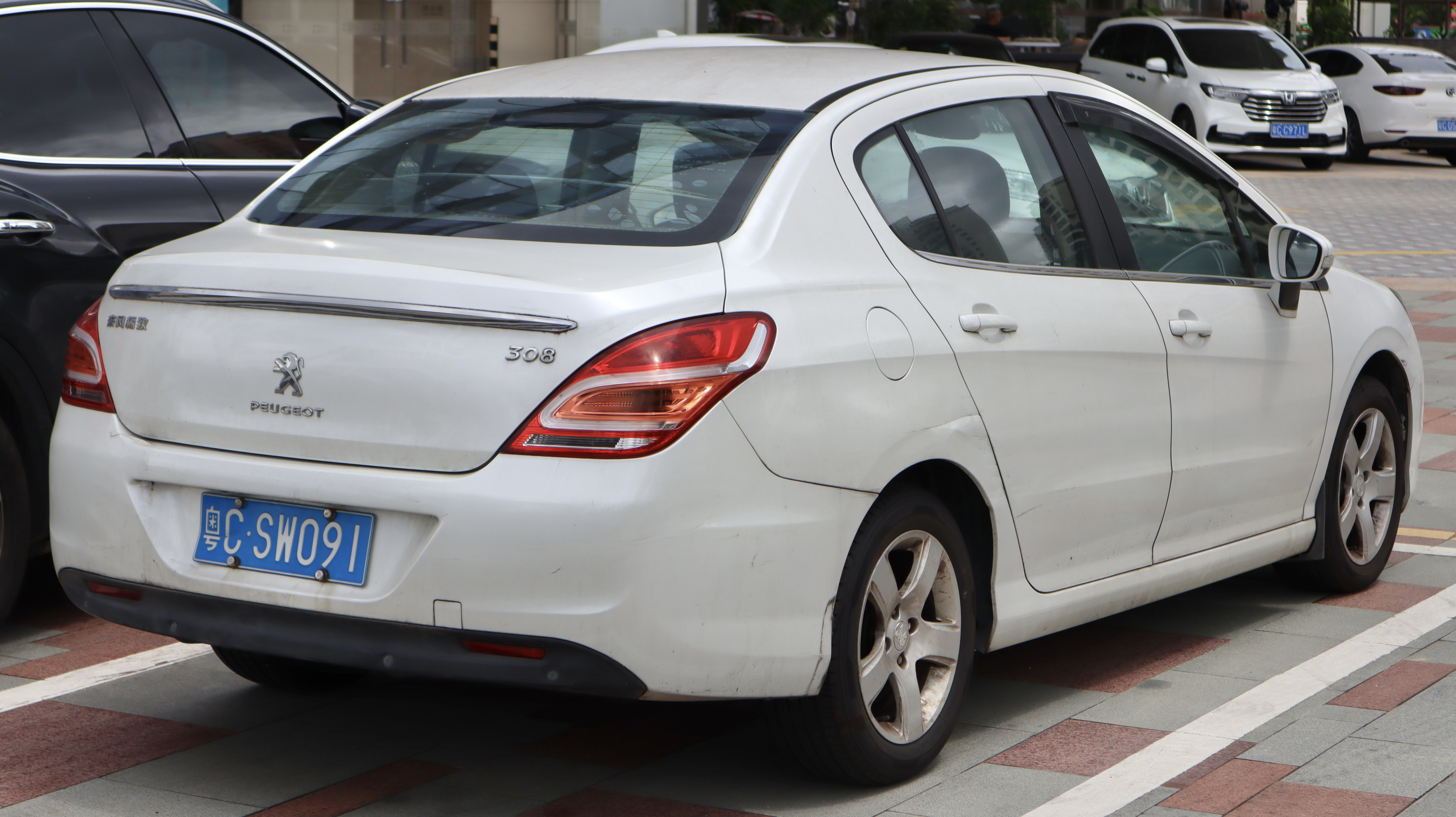
Dongfeng–Peugeot 308 Sedan in China

==== Hatchback ====
The 308 was available as a five-door hatchback, with a three-door limited to a few markets. In May 2010, Peugeot announced the return of a GTi model (known as the GT in the United Kingdom), featuring a turbocharged 1.6 L engine with 200 bhp (149 kW; 203 PS).

==== SW (Estate) ====
A station wagon concept version of the 308, the Peugeot 308 SW Prologue, was also unveiled at the 2007 Frankfurt Motor Show. The production version was shown at the 78th International Geneva Motor Show in March 2008 and went on sale that summer. The 308 SW (or 308 Touring in Australia) was available in five- or seven-seat versions.

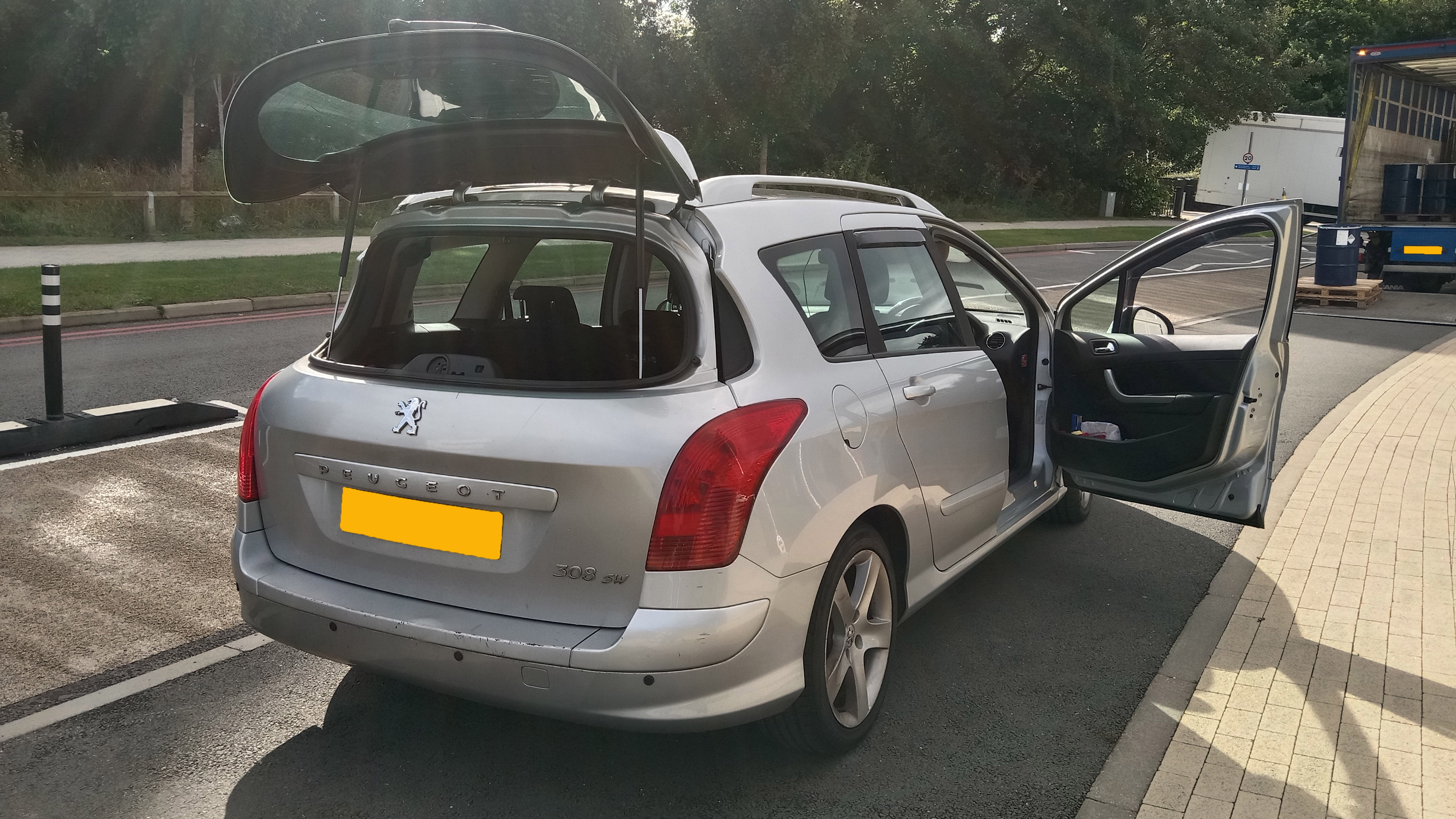
308 SW Rear glass hatch feature

==== Cabriolet ====
A cabriolet with a retractable hardtop known as the 308 CC replaced the Peugeot 307 CC in February 2009. The roof folds into the boot in twenty seconds, and at up to speeds of 7.5 mph (12 km/h). With the roof up the boot space capacity is 465 dm^{3} (16.4 cu ft) but this reduces to 266 dm^{3} (9.4 cu ft) with the roof down.

==== Saloon ====
In September 2011, Peugeot presented, for the market in China, a four-door saloon/sedan version of the 308. This version produced for the market in China by Dongfeng is based on 308 facelift, but differs from the model in Europe, with large front grille, more chrome on the hips and different shape of the LED tail lights. The interior is identical to the European model.

The engine range includes a petrol 1.6 16V 110 hp and 143 hp 2.0 16V. The boot/trunk has a volume of 502 dm^{3} (17.7 cu ft). The Peugeot 308 saloon/sedan, which sold 160,000 units in three years, joins the Peugeot 408 in China, a C-segment car with a slightly higher price.

=== Facelift (2011) ===
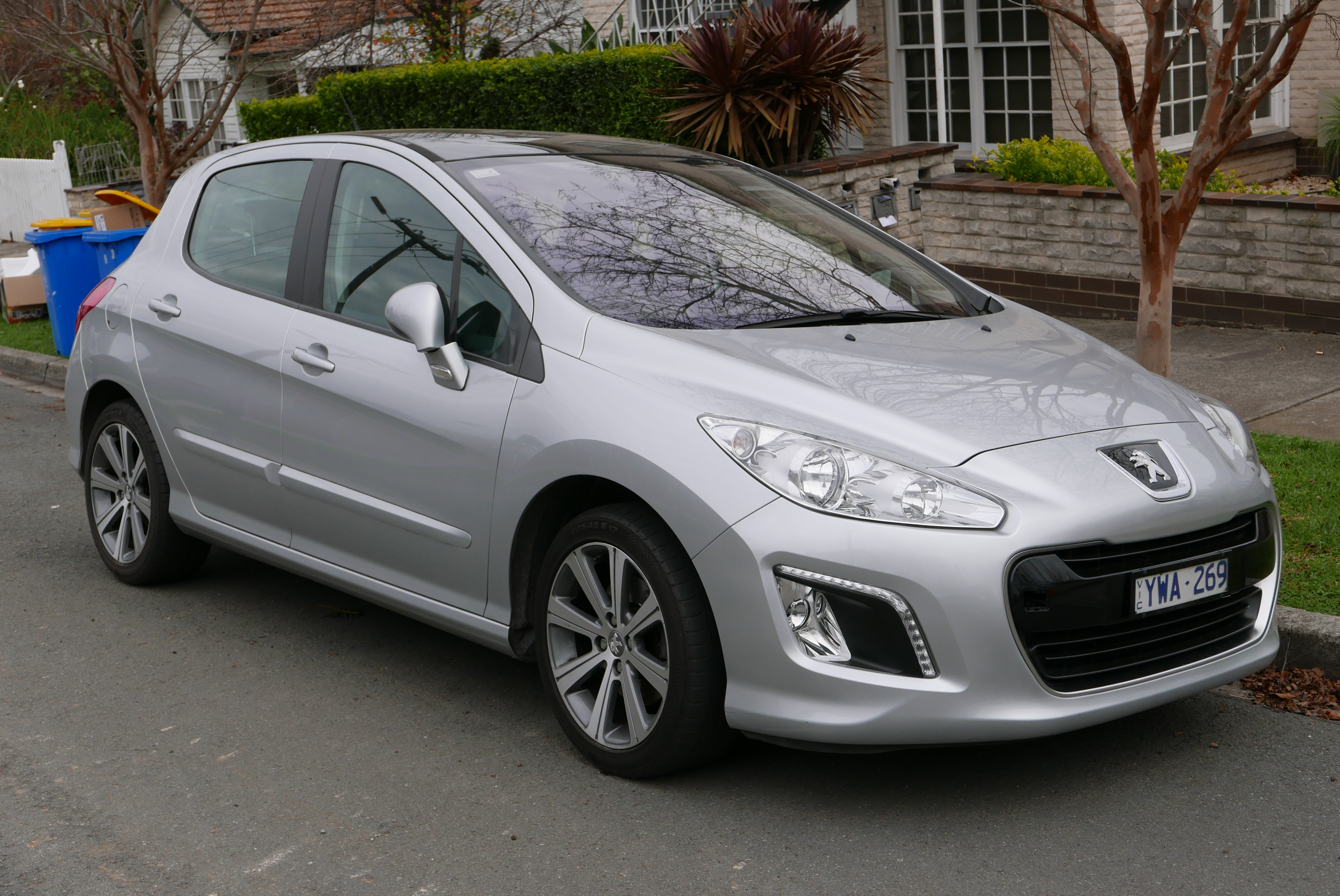

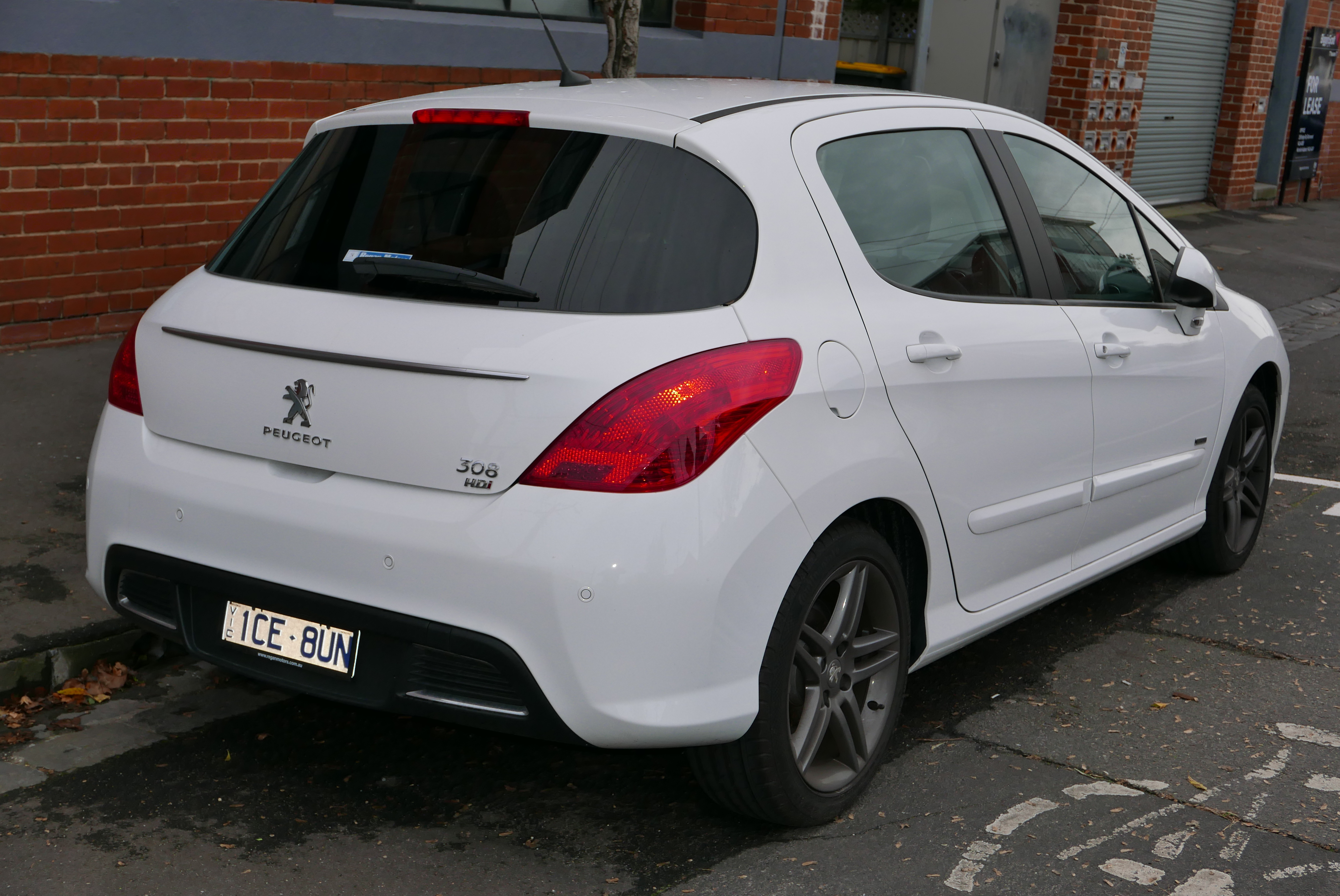
Facelift European model

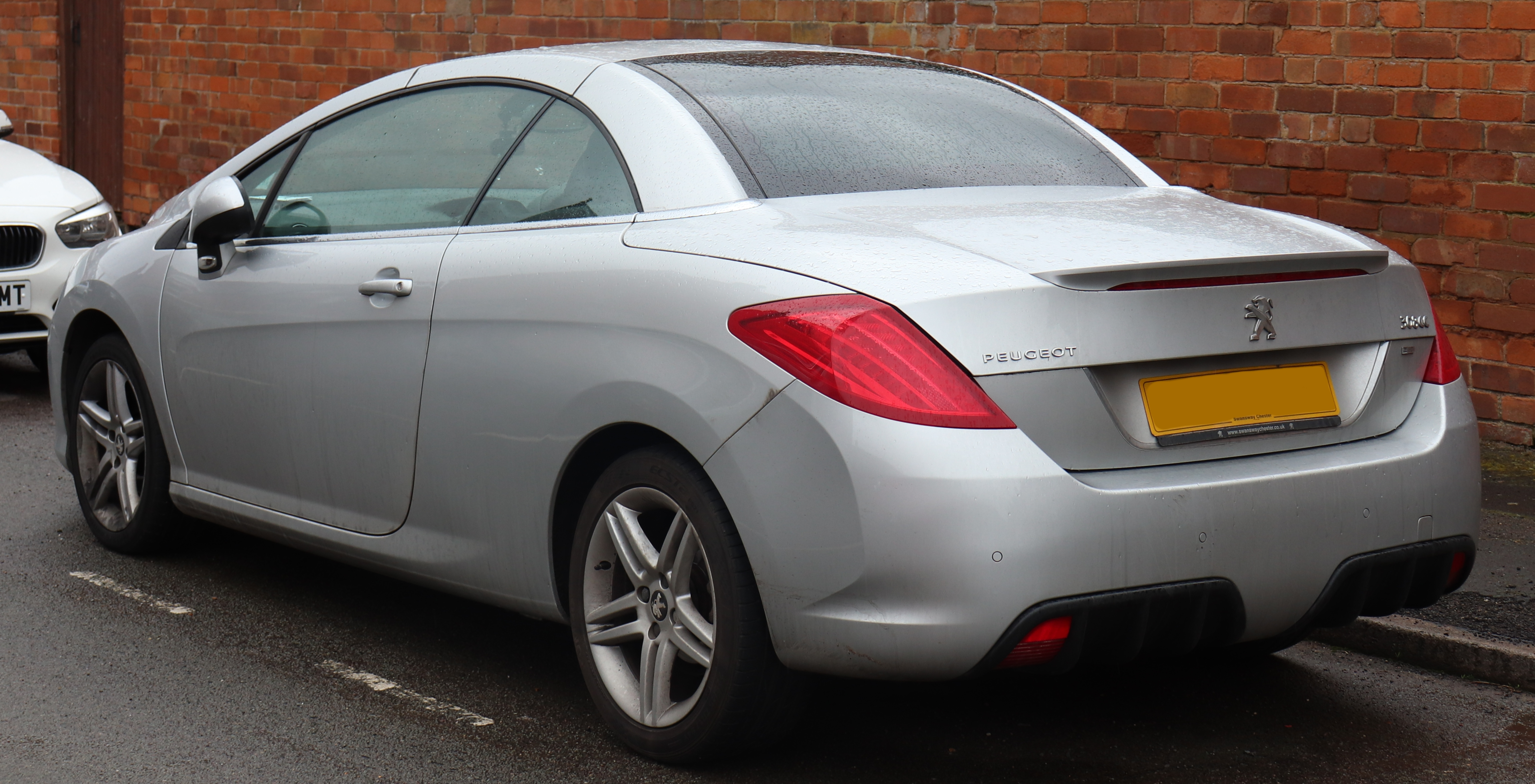
Peugeot 308 CC (facelift)

A facelifted 308 was released in May 2011, following the public launch at the 2011 Geneva Motor Show, with a new front end and minor changes to the rear of the vehicle. Peugeot also launched the 308 e-HDI micro-hybrid model with stop-start technology, a system to recover energy during deceleration and a hybrid battery that delivers additional energy on startup.

A full hybrid 3008 was also announced at the same time. The version produced in South America is assembled with this facelift. The facelift was also given to the 308 SW and 308 CC.

=== Second facelift (2015) ===
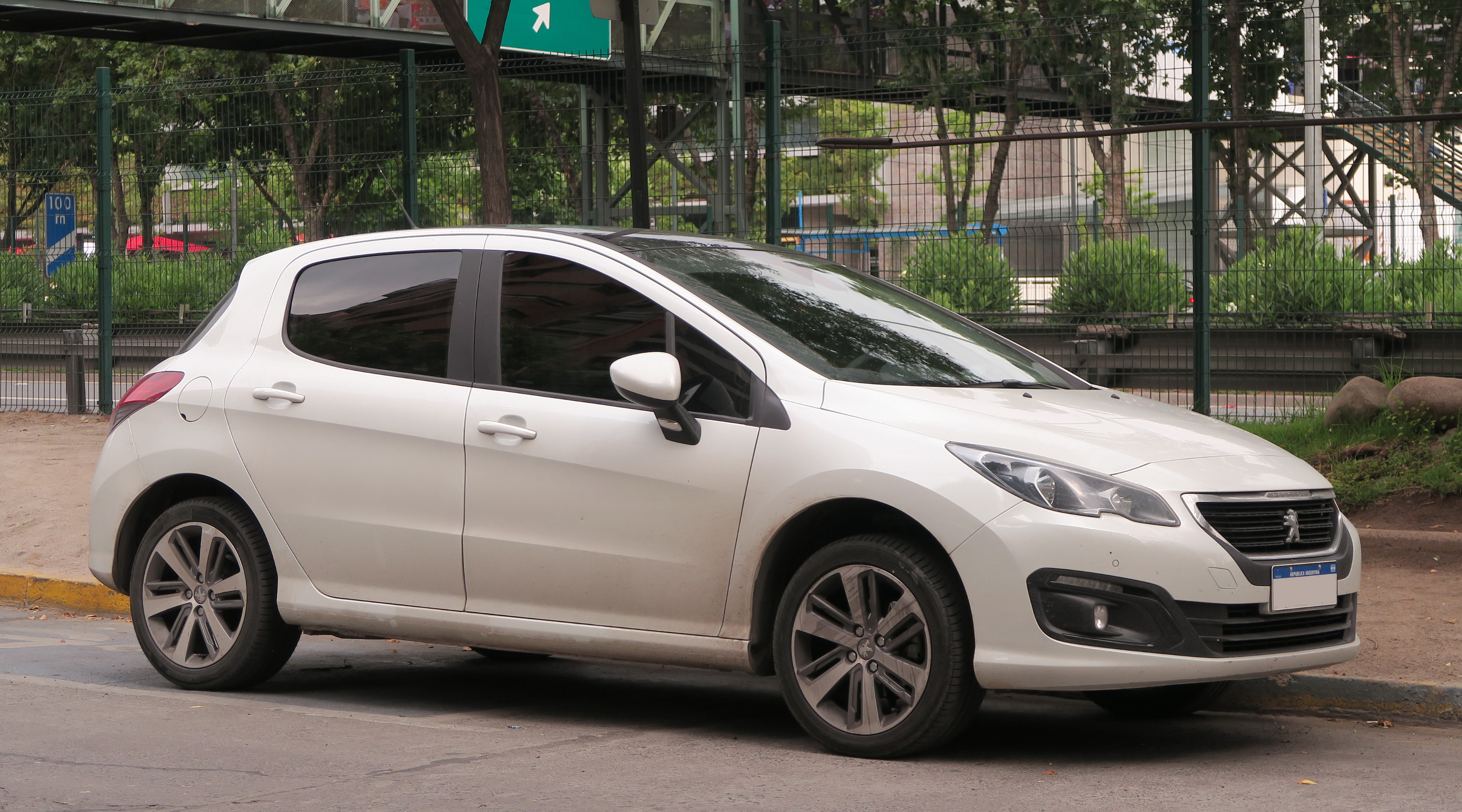
Facelift South-American model

As the EMP2 platform was not industrialized in South America, the first generation 308 continued to be marketed there and received a second facelift in 2015. The front bumper is inspired by the 308 II (reduced front lights, Peugeot logo and text, fog lights, less contoured hood/bonnet ...).

The interior gained some elements of the 308 II. There is a touchscreen integrated into the centre console instead of the traditional CD/MP3 and empty cubby-holes.

For some years, the 308 I was sold in Argentina alongside the European-built 308 II, locally badged 308 S.

As it is manufactured alongside the first generation 408, the first generation 308 continued to be produced in Argentina until 2021, when it was discontinued without any local or imported direct replacement.

=== Concepts ===
==== 308 Hybrid ====
Bosch announced in June 2007 that it was supplying hybrid diesel-electric technology to Peugeot for the 308. A prototype 308 equipped with this technology was displayed in the Frankfurt Motor Show of 2007, and a further 'Prologue' concept car was shown at the 2008 Paris Motor Show, featuring a 1.6-litre HDi engine to turn the front wheels, and an electric motor to turn the rears.

==== 308 RCZ Coupé ====
Peugeot presented a 2+2 coupé concept car development of the 308, the 308 RCZ, at the 2007 Frankfurt Motor Show. This coupé concept is 18 mm lower than the standard car. It has similar proportions to the Audi TT. The final production model was unveiled at the 2009 Frankfurt Motor Show as the RCZ without the 308 name, and went on sale in the spring of 2010.

=== Awards ===
In November 2007, the 308 was awarded the Goldene Lenkrad (Golden Steering Wheel) in Germany. A panel of automotive professionals chose the 308 as the best compact family car after it finished first in nine of the 15 criteria.

=== Safety ===
ANCAP test results* Peugeot 308 5 door hatches with ESC and driver knee airbag (2008)
Test	Score
Overall	5 /5 stars
Frontal offset	14.32/16
Side impact	16/16
Pole	2/2
Seat belt reminders	3/3
Whiplash protection	Not Assessed
Pedestrian protection	Adequate
Electronic stability control	Optional

ANCAP test results* Peugeot 308CC variant(s) as tested (2009)
Test	Score
Overall	5 /5 stars
Frontal offset	14.87/16
Side impact	16/16
Pole	2/2
Seat belt reminders	3/3
Whiplash protection	Not Assessed
Pedestrian protection	Adequate
Electronic stability control	Standard

ANCAP test results* Peugeot 308 all variants (2011)
Test	Score
Overall	5 /5 stars
Frontal offset	14.05/16
Side impact	16/16
Pole	2/2
Seat belt reminders	2/3
Whiplash protection	Not Assessed
Pedestrian protection	Adequate
Electronic stability control	Standard

Euro NCAP test results* Peugeot 308 1.6 diesel Premium (LHD) (2007)
Test	Score	Rating
Adult occupant:	35	5 /5 stars
Child occupant:	39	4 /5 stars
Pedestrian:	19	3 /4 stars

== Second generation (T9; 2013) ==
Peugeot 308 II
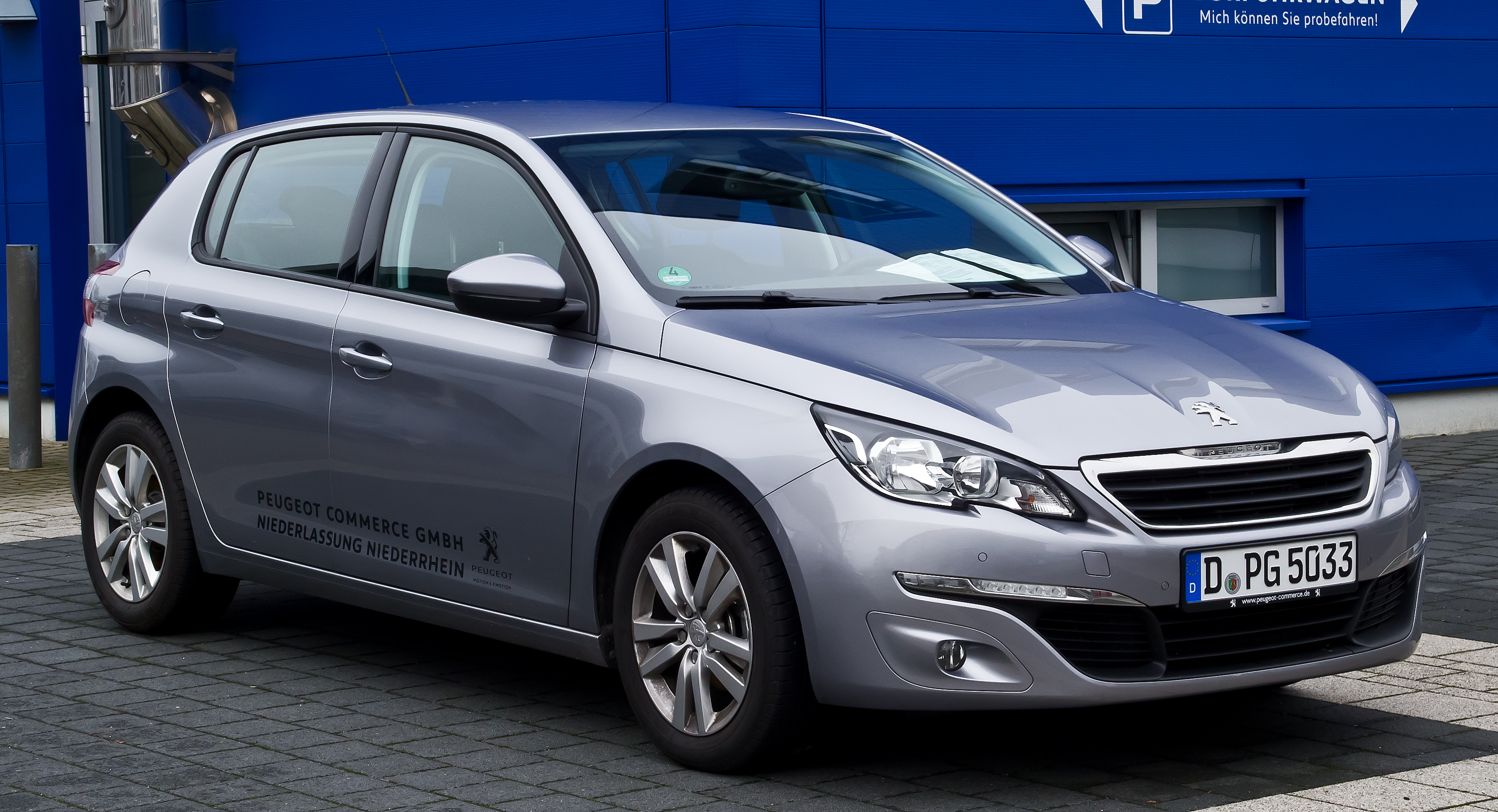
- Peugeot 308 Hatchback (pre-facelift) front

Overview
- Model code: T9
- Also called: Peugeot 308 S (Argentina)
- Production: June 2013–May 2021
- Assembly: France: Mulhouse (Mulhouse Plant); Sochaux (Sochaux Plant); China: Wuhan (DPCA); Malaysia: Gurun (NAM)
- Designer: Thomas Röhm

Body and chassis
- Body style: 5-door hatchback 5-door estate 4-door saloon
- Layout: Front-engine, front-wheel-drive or four-wheel-drive
- Platform: PSA EMP2 V1
- Related: Peugeot 408; Peugeot 3008; Peugeot 508; Peugeot 5008; Peugeot RCZ; Citroën C4 Picasso

Powertrain
- Engine: Petrol: 1.2 L EB2F VTi 12v I3; 1.2 L EB2DTS PureTech 12v I3 (turbo); 1.6 L EP6DT THP/Puretech 16V I4 (turbo); Diesel: 1.5 L DV5 RC BlueHDi 16V I4; 1.6 L DV6 C/D/FC HDi/e-HDi/BlueHDi 8v I4; 2.0 L DW10 FC/FD HDi/BlueHDi 16v I4
- Transmission: 5/6-speed manual 6-speed EAT6 Aisin AWTF-80 SC; 8-speed EAT8 Aisin AWF8F35 automatic

Dimensions
- Wheelbase: 2,620 mm (103.1 in); 2,730 mm (107.5 in) (SW)
- Length: 4,253 mm (167.4 in); 4,585 mm (180.5 in) (SW)
- Width: 1,815 mm (71.5 in)
- Height: 1,460 mm (57.5 in); 1,471 mm (57.9 in) (SW)
- Curb weight: 1,060–1,320 kg (2,340–2,910 lb)

Chronology
- Successor: Peugeot 408 saloon (China)

The second generation 308 was unveiled on 13 May 2013, with updated style along with the 508 and the 208, and was displayed at the 2013 Frankfurt Motor Show. Peugeot changed its numbering system where the final digit is fixed: 8 for the mainstream range, and 1 for the models aimed at emerging countries, such as the Peugeot 301. It is built on the PSA EMP2 platform, shared with Citroën C4 Picasso, resulting in 140 kg (310 lb) weight loss compared to previous generation.

The changes included daytime running lights/DRL at the bottom and the blinker (turn signal indicator) is on the daytime light, advising the pedestrian or other road user to which direction it is moving.

=== GTi by Peugeot Sport ===
The Peugeot 308 GTi by Peugeot Sport featured engines producing 250 hp (186 kW) and 270 hp (201 kW). The 250 hp version had full LED headlights, an electronic limited slip differential, 18" alloys, keyless entry, stop/start technology, 11 mm lowered ride height, a coloured reversing camera and twin exhausts.

Additionally, the 270 hp version gets 380 mm Alcon front brakes, massaging leather/Alcantara bucket seats, a Torsen limited-slip differential and 19-inch lightweight alloy wheels.

=== Facelift (2017) ===
The features include a new bonnet and front bumper design and indicators that scroll, and a newly designed grille that features the famous Peugeot Lion. All models, except Active and GTi, feature the Panoramic roof. New DRLs are matched at the back with the LED Claws lit permanently when the vehicle is running.

A new more powerful 1.5HDi engine with 130 bhp joined the line up from September 2017. All models have TomTom satellite navigation as standard in addition to the central touchscreen update.

=== 2020 update ===
In July 2020, a revised 308 was announced featuring a number of trim and colour changes, but most significantly, the introduction of the digital i-Cockpit which was first introduced on the Peugeot 3008.

Production of the 308 II ended in May 2021.

=== Gallery ===
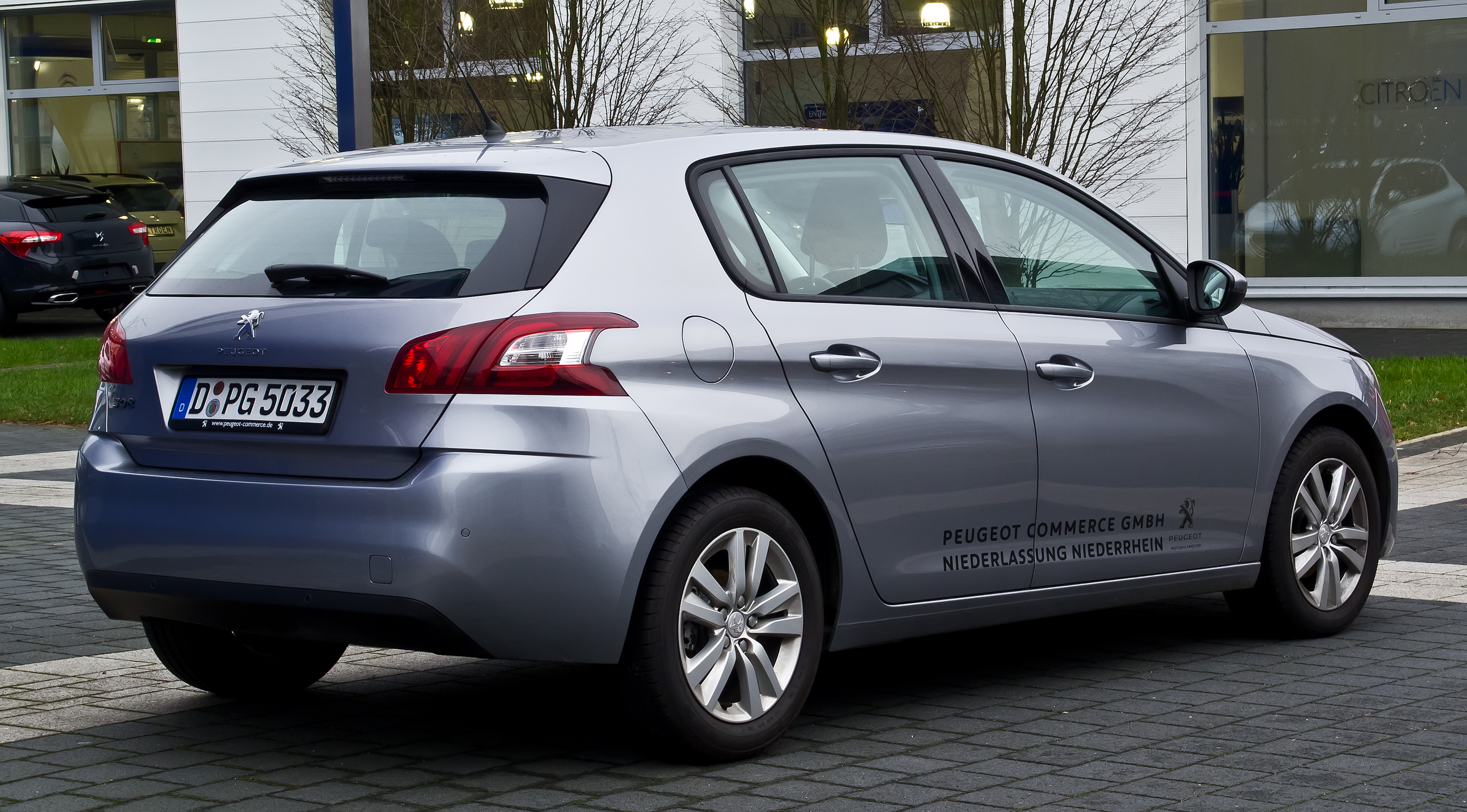
Hatchback (pre-facelift) rear

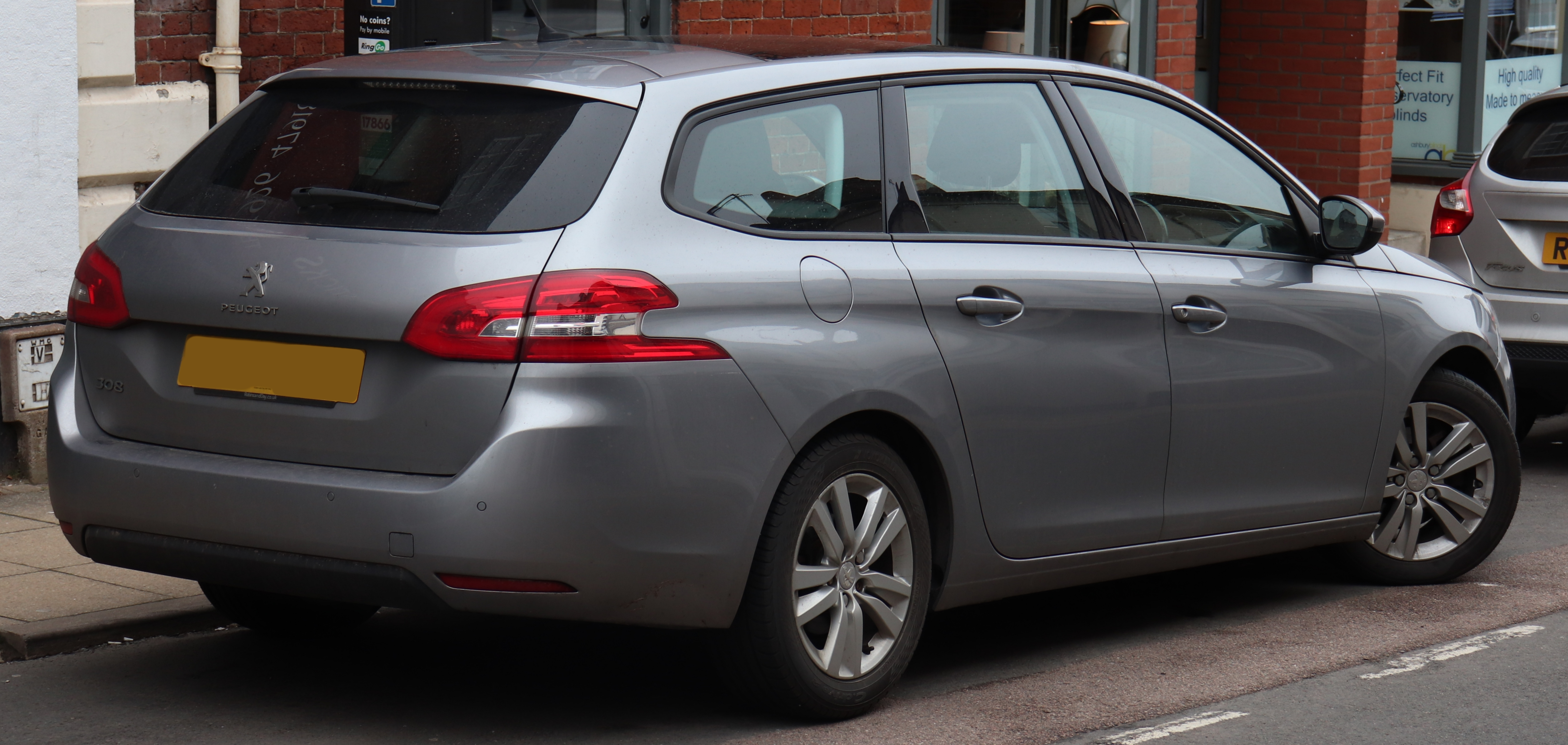
SW (pre-facelift)

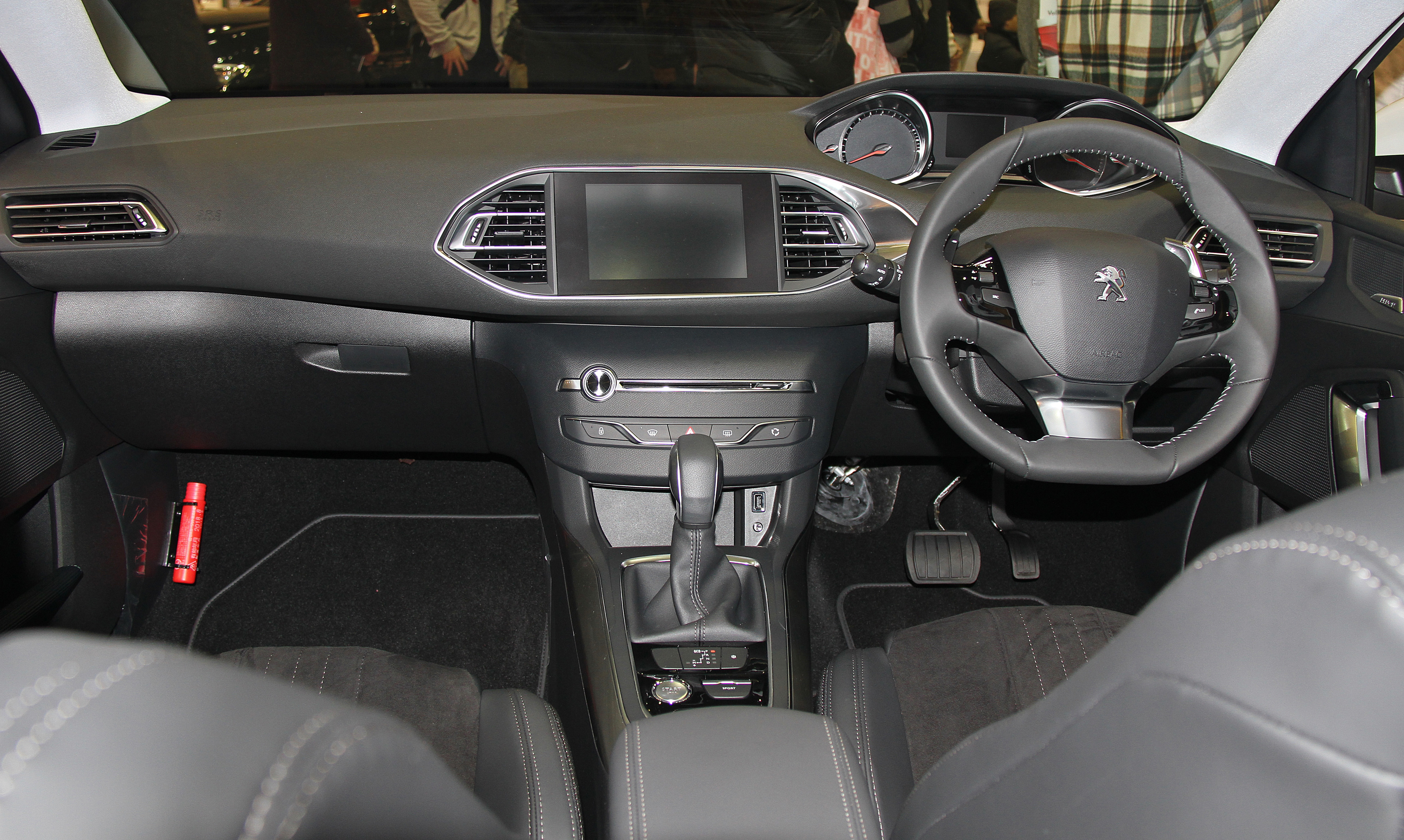
Interior

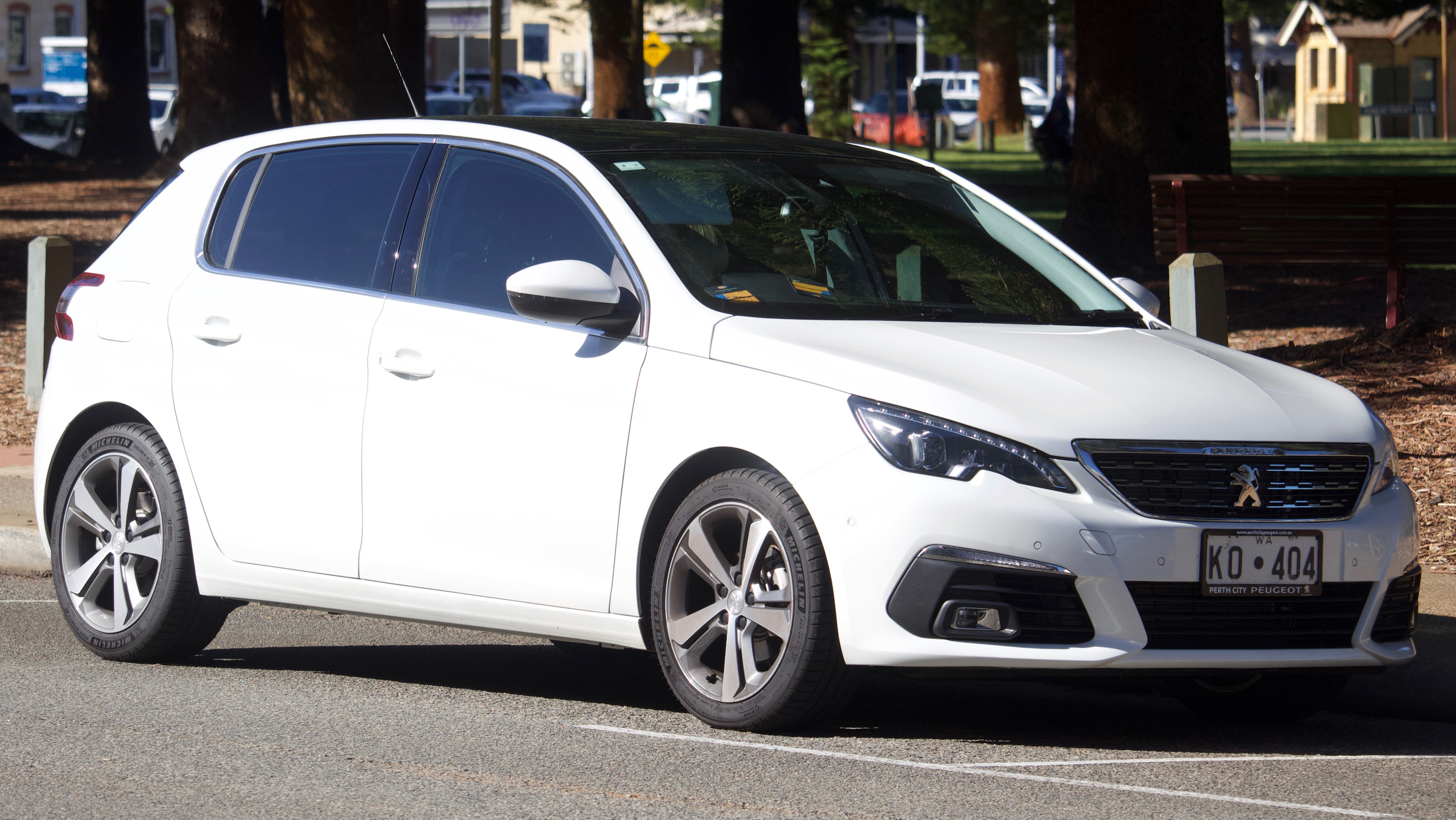
Hatchback (facelift) front

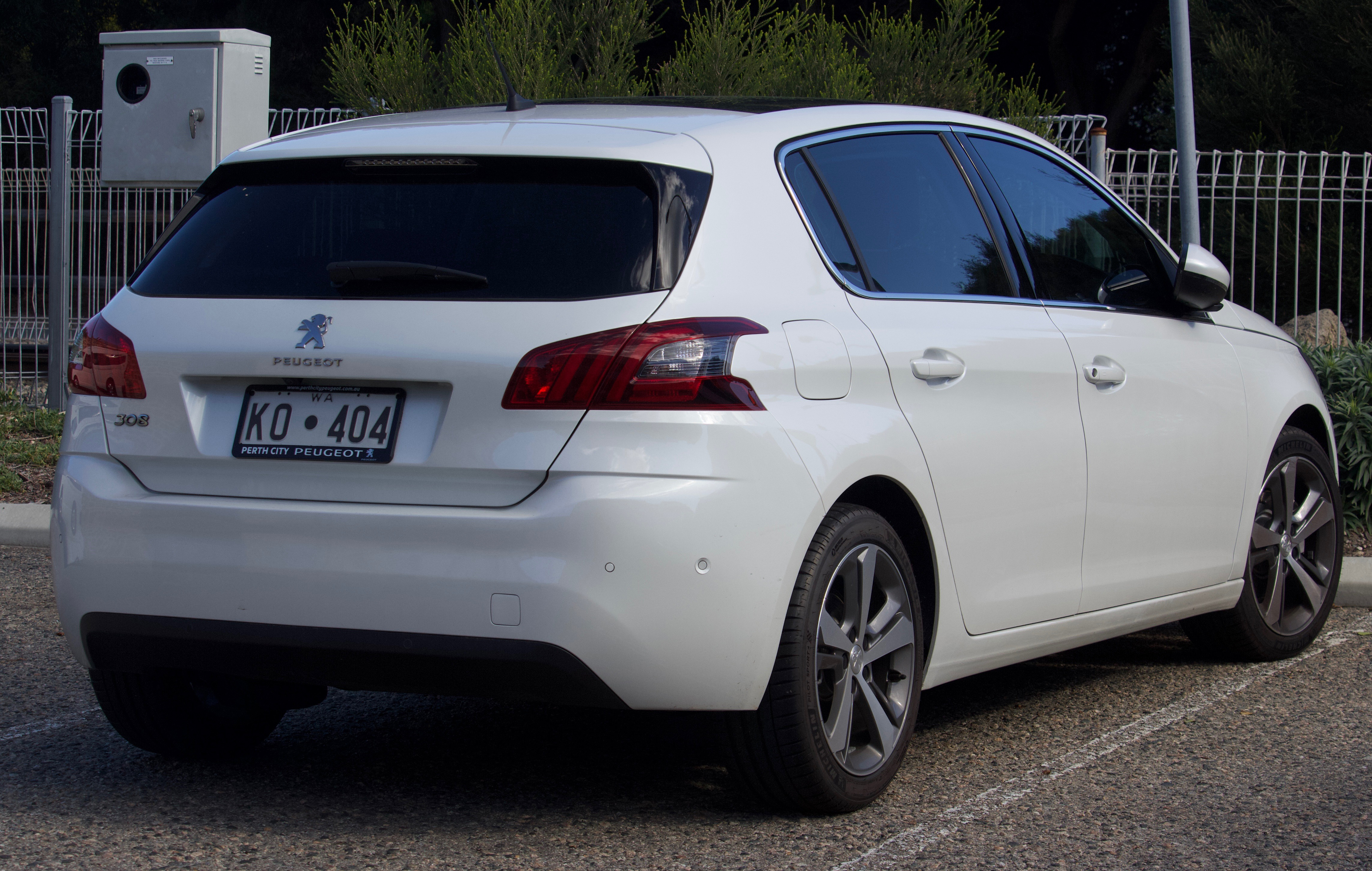
Hatchback (facelift) rear

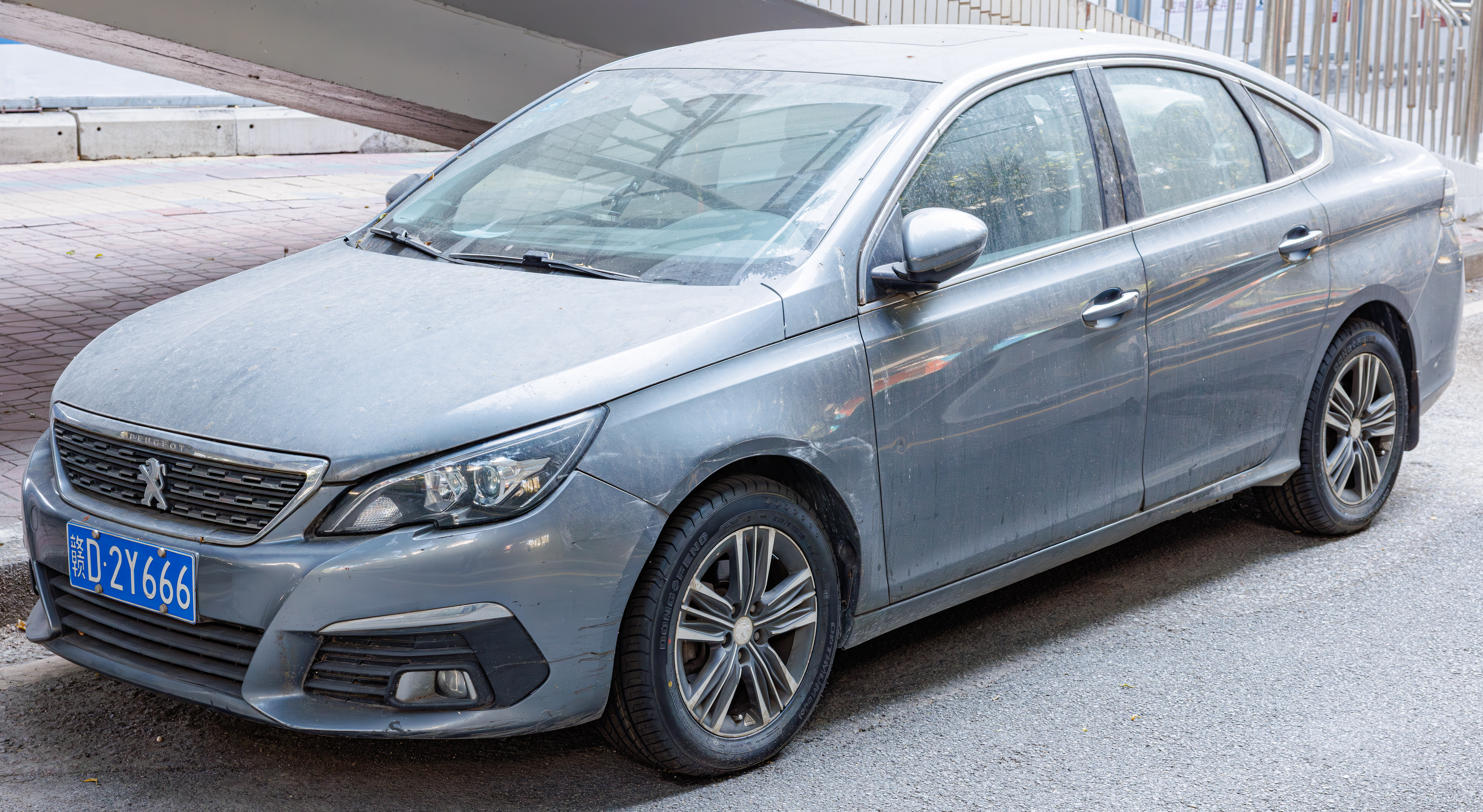
Sedan

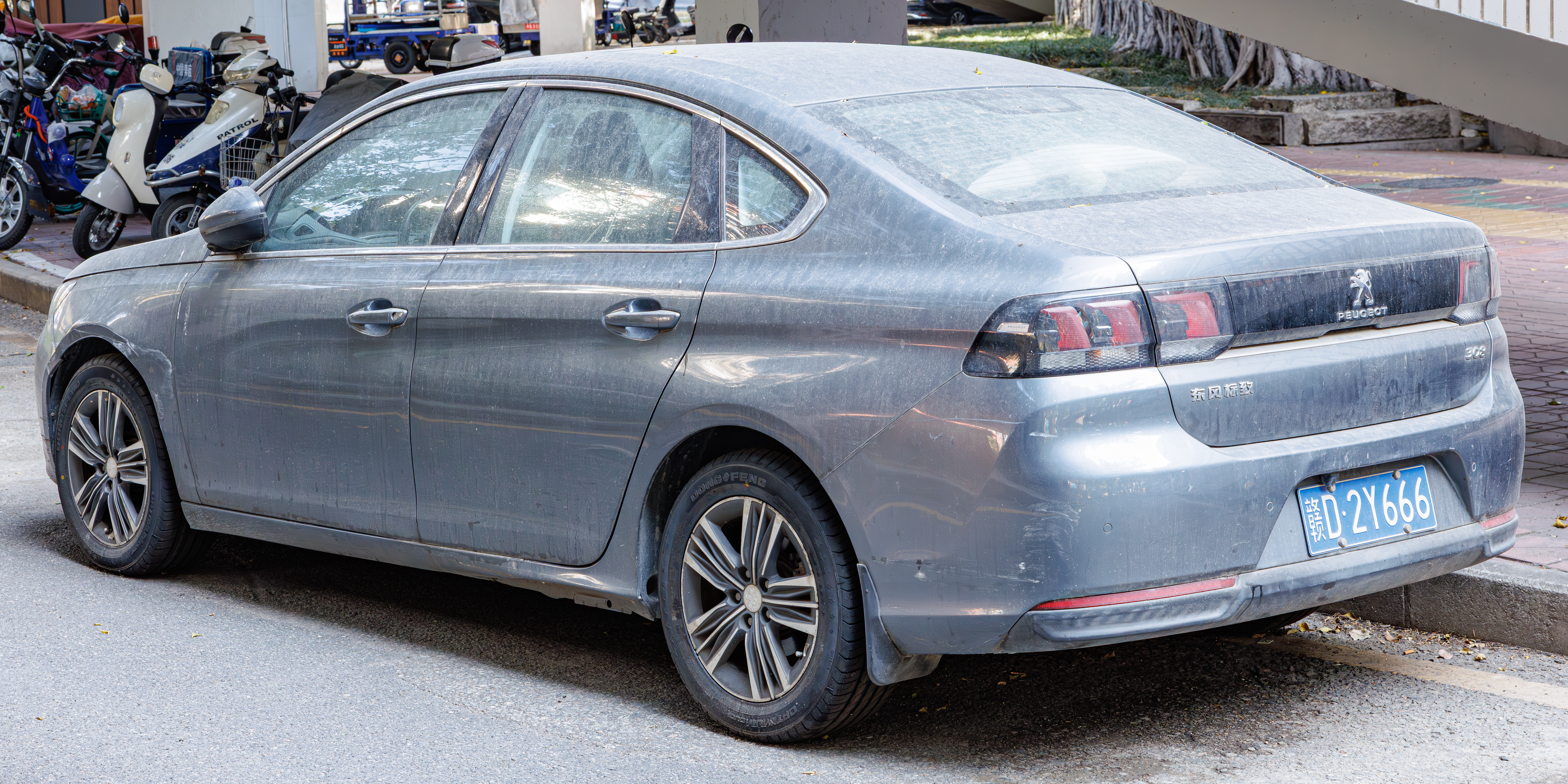
Sedan (rear view)

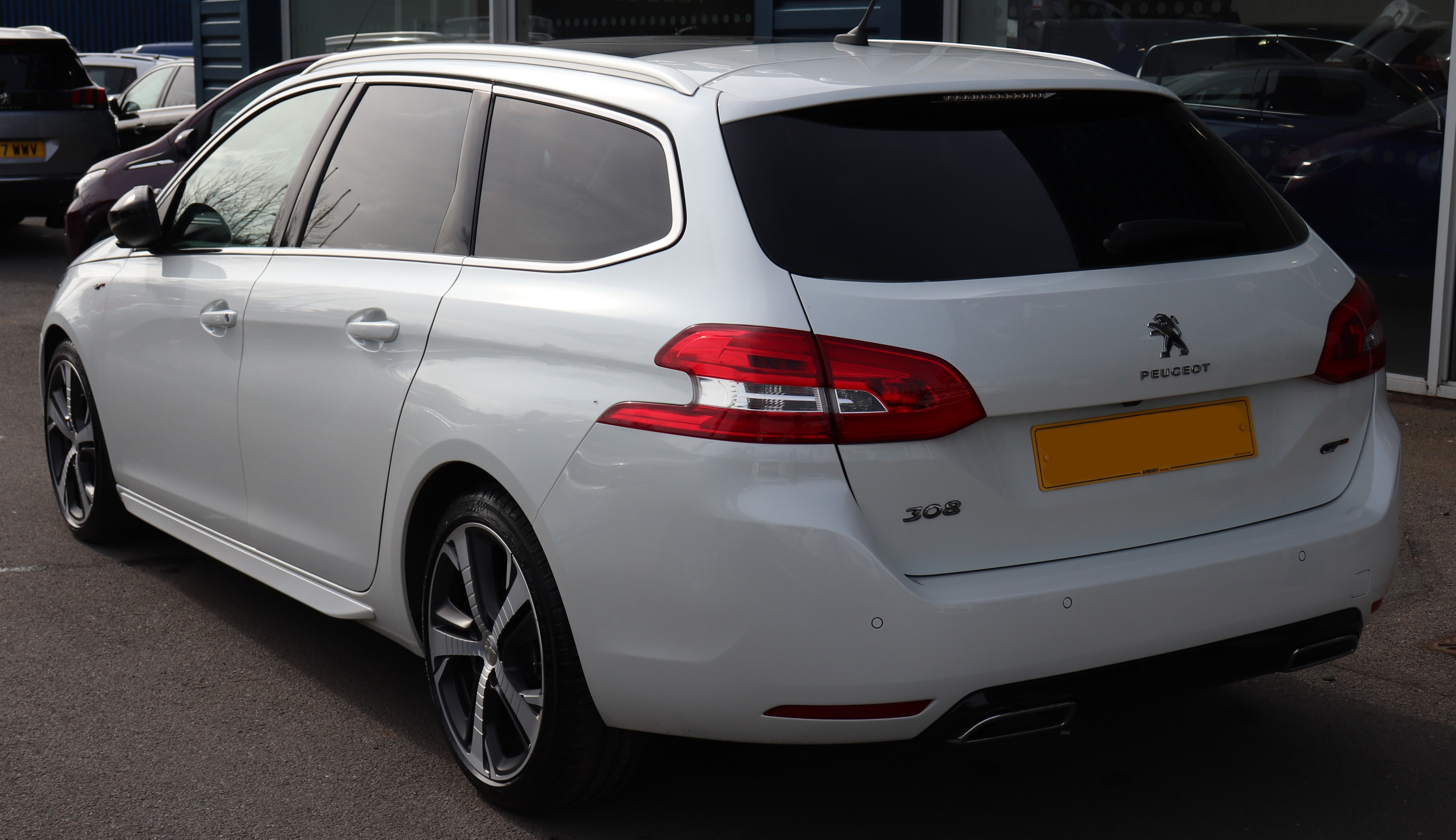
SW (facelift)

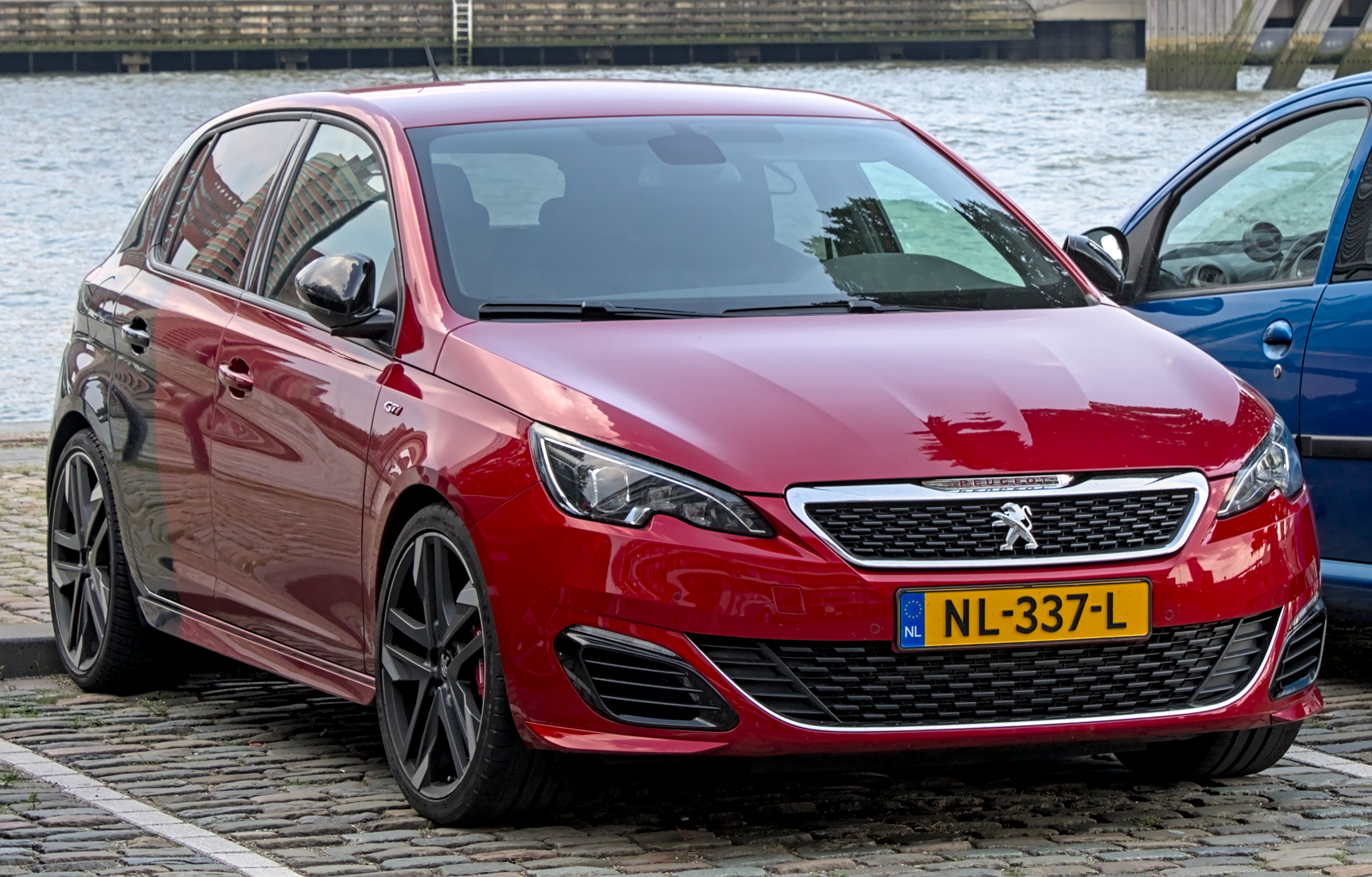
Peugeot 308 GTi (pre-facelift) front

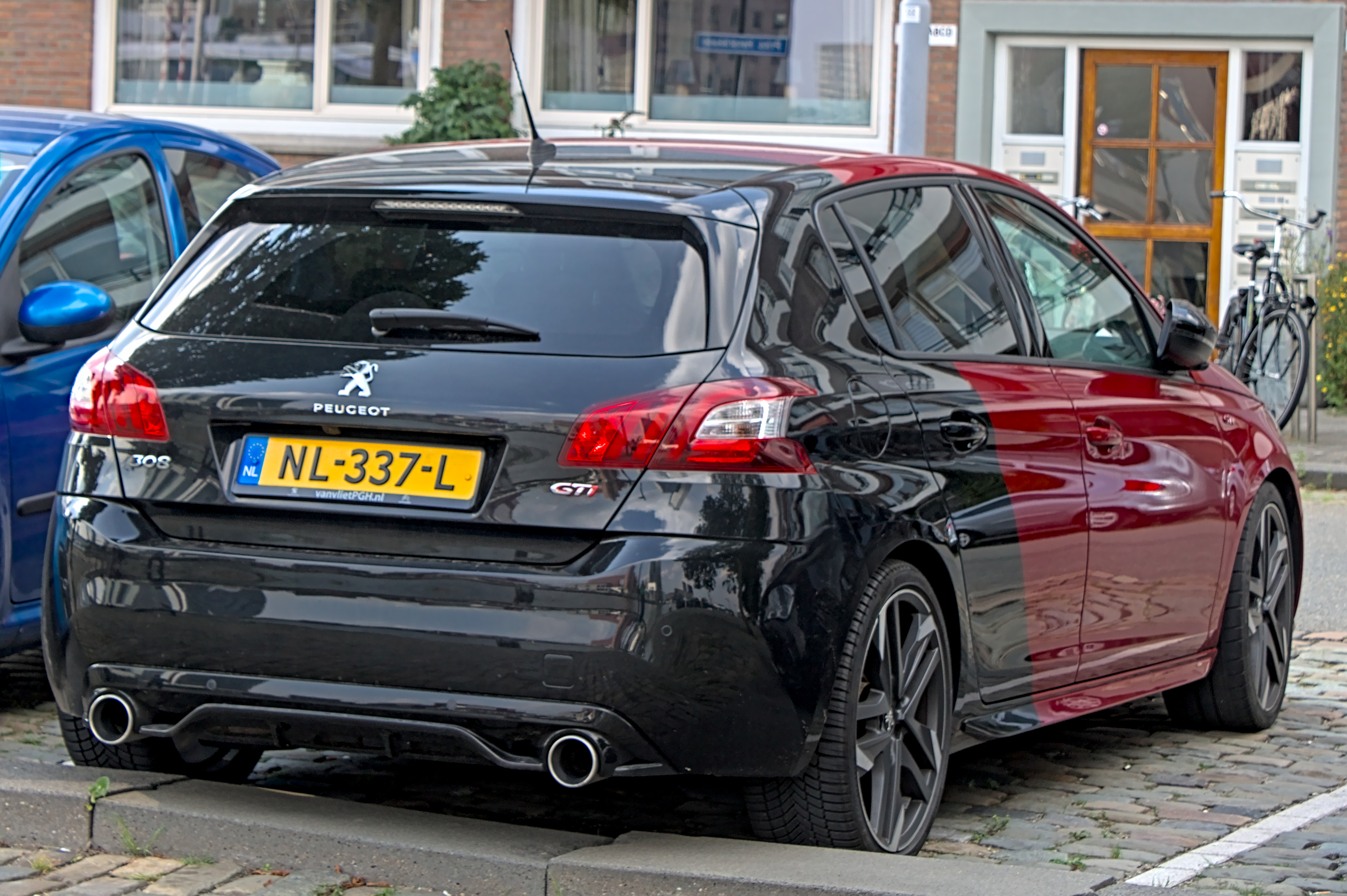
Peugeot 308 GTi (pre-facelift) rear

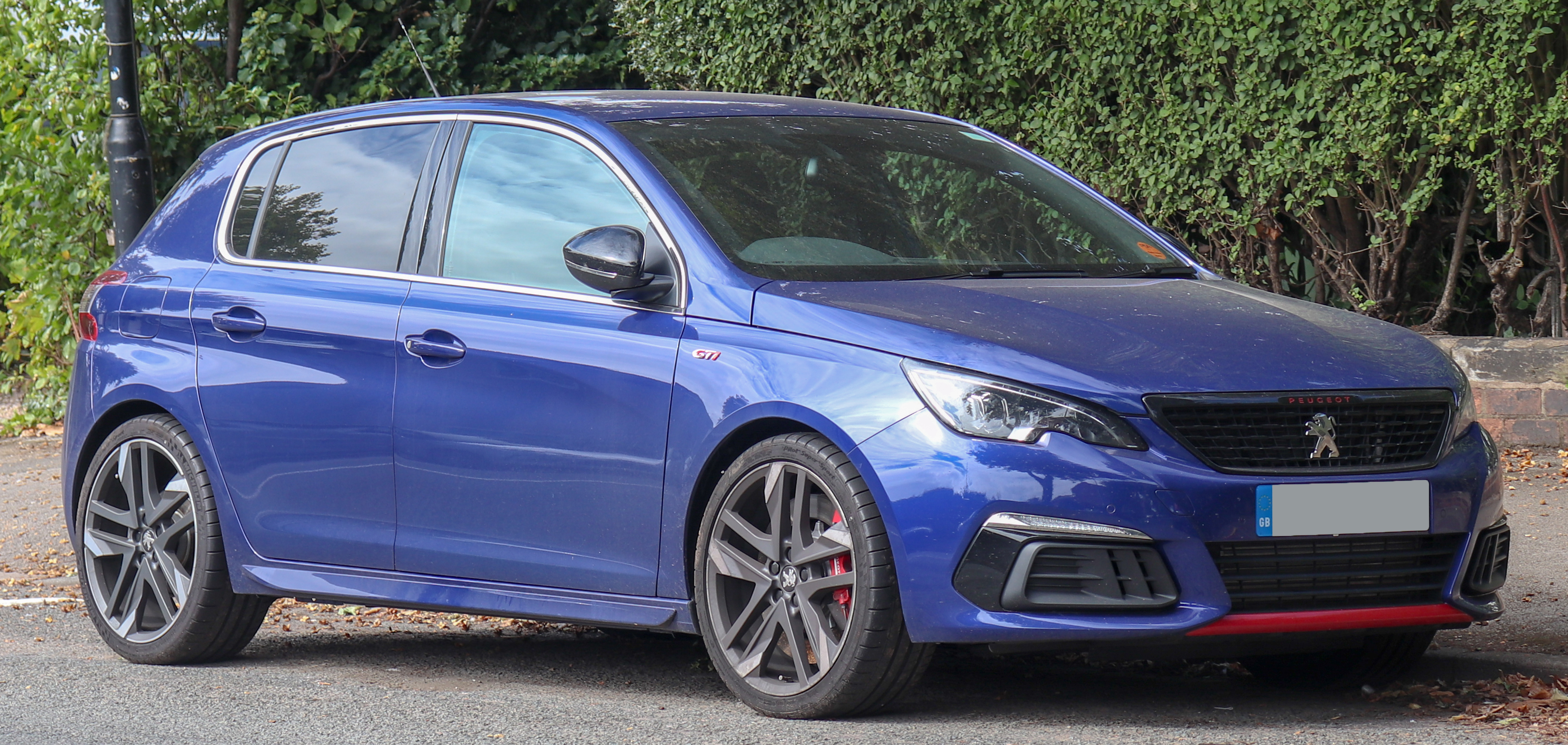
Peugeot 308 GTi (facelift) front

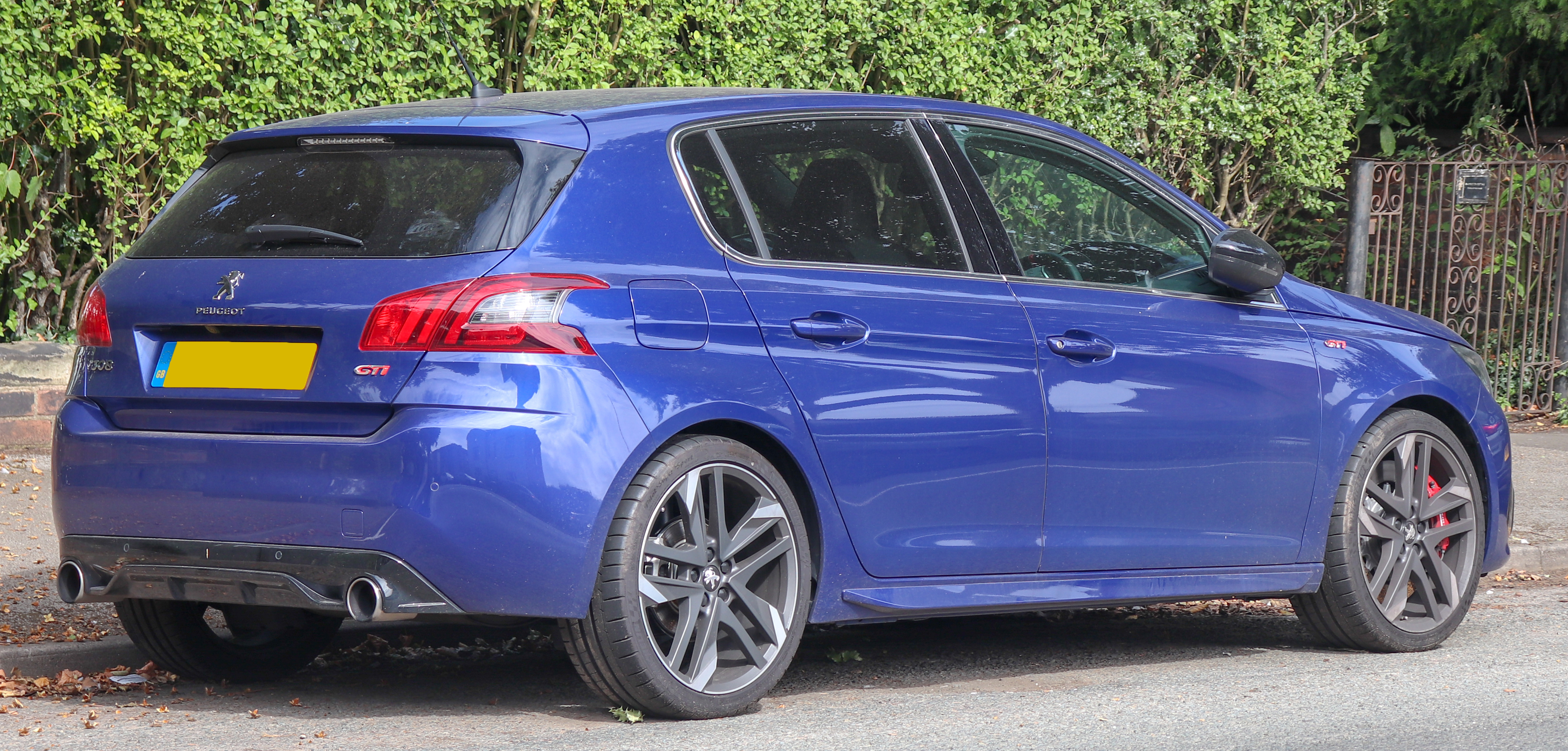
Peugeot 308 GTi (facelift) rear

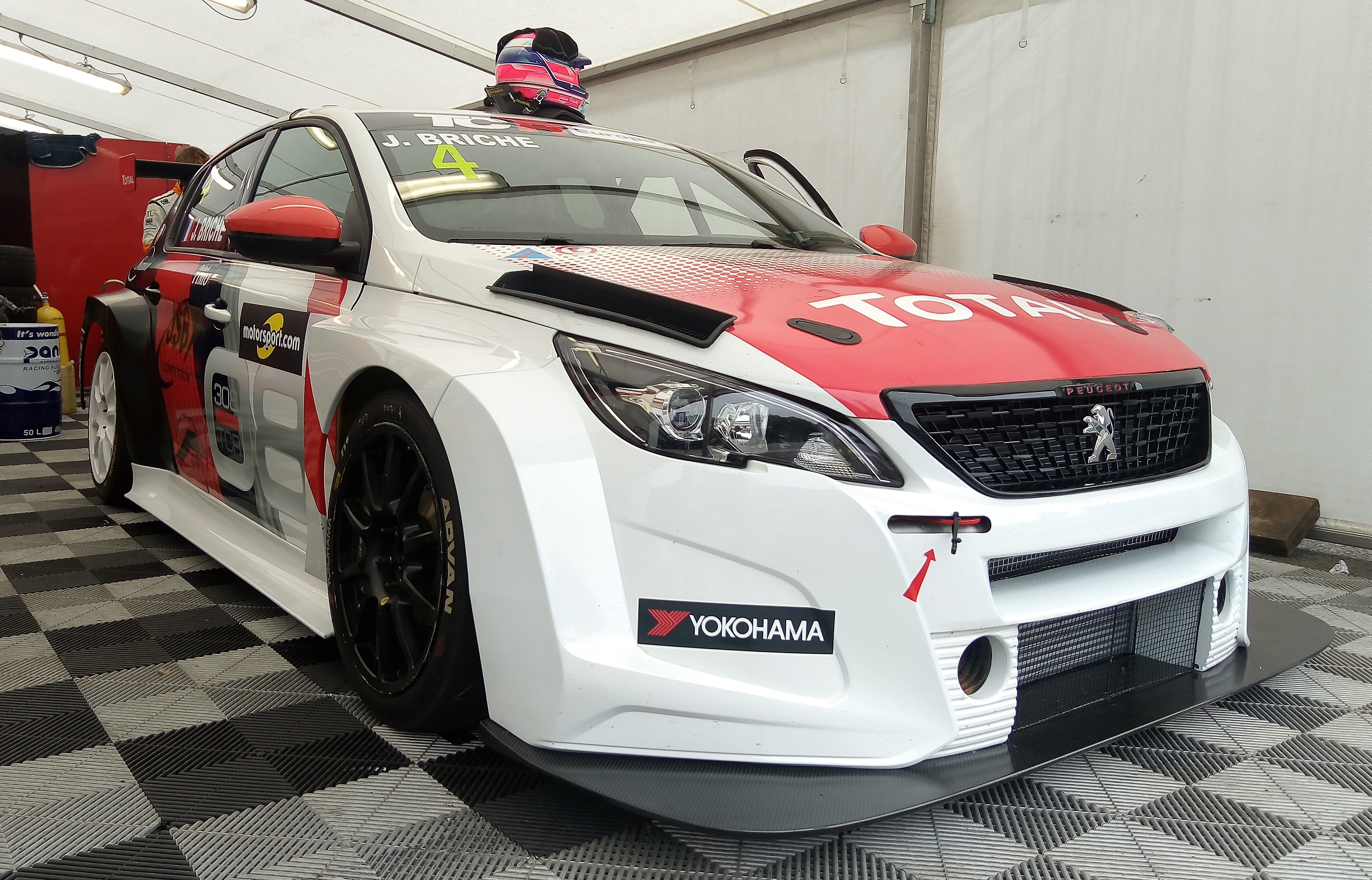
Peugeot 308 TCR

=== Safety ===
ANCAP test results* Peugeot 308 diesel variants only (2014)
Test	Score
Overall	5 /5 stars
Frontal offset	14.82/16
Side impact	16/16
Pole	2/2
Seat belt reminders	3/3
Whiplash protection	Good
Pedestrian protection	Adequate
Electronic stability control	Standard

Euro NCAP test results* Peugeot 308 1.6 diesel (LHD) (2013)
Test	Points	%
Overall:	5 /5 stars	
Adult occupant:	33	92%
Child occupant:	39	79%
Pedestrian:	23	64%
Safety assist:	7	81%

== Third generation (P5; 2021) ==
Peugeot 308 III
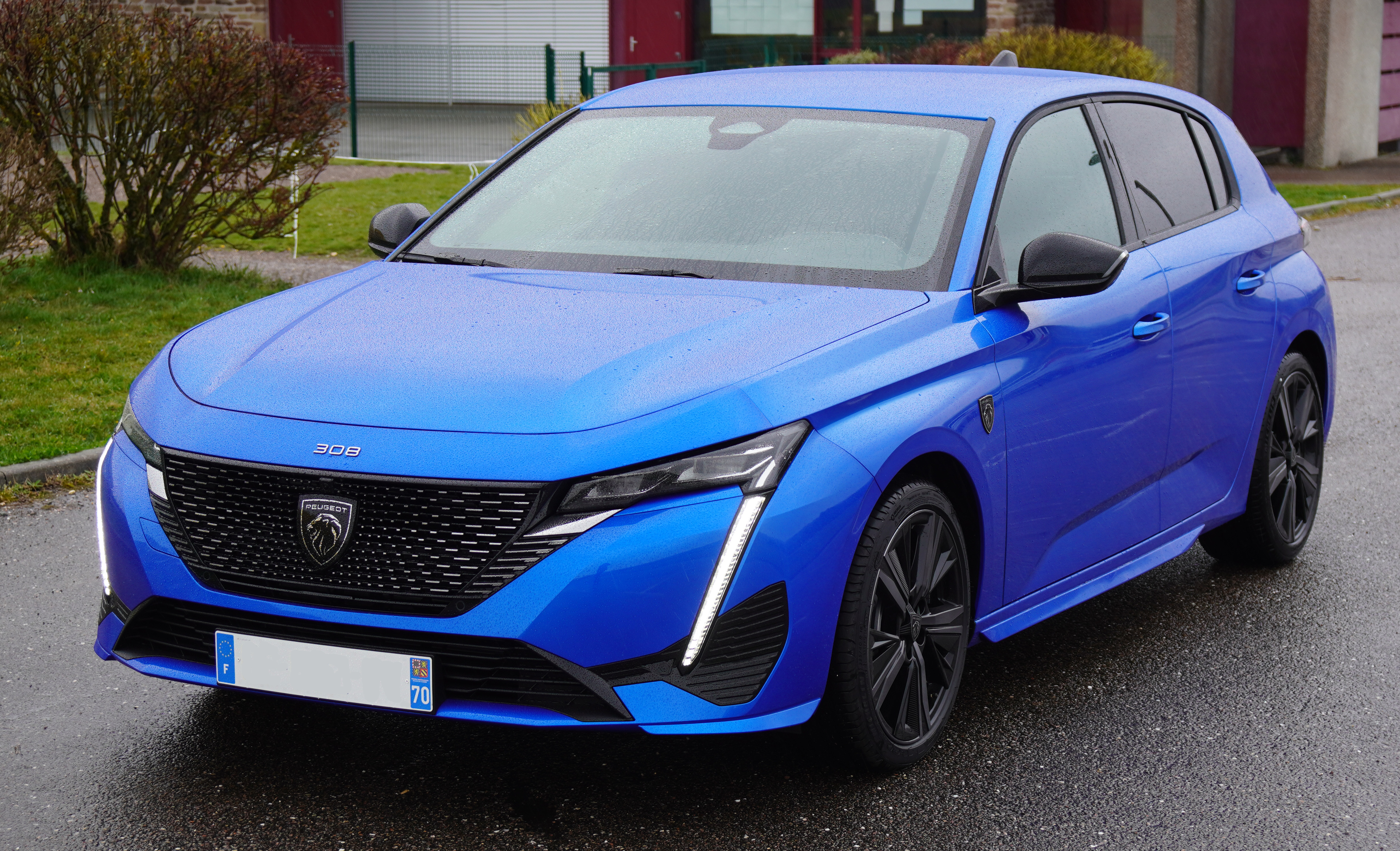

Overview
- Model code: P5
- Production: September 2021–present
- Assembly: France: Mulhouse (Mulhouse Plant)
- Designer: Sébastien Criquet

Body and chassis
- Body style: 5-door hatchback; 5-door estate
- Layout: Front-engine, front-wheel-drive
- Platform: EMP2 V3
- Related: Peugeot 408 (crossover); DS 4 (crossover); Opel Astra L

Powertrain
- Engine: Petrol: 1.2 L Puretech turbo I3; Petrol plug-in hybrid: 1.6 L EP6FDT I4; Diesel: 1.5 L DV5 BlueHDi I4
- Electric motor: Synchronous Electric Motor, 81 kW (110 PS; 109 hp) (308 PHEV); Permanent Magnet Synchronous Motor, 115 kW (156 PS; 154 hp) (e-308)
- Transmission: 6-speed manual 8-speed EAT8 Aisin automatic 1-speed direct-drive fixed gear ratio (e-308)
- Hybrid drivetrain: Plug-in hybrid (PHEV)
- Battery: 12.4 kWh (PHEV); 54/50 kWh (e-308 gross/net)
- Electric range: 58–60 km (36–37 mi) (PHEV, WLTP); 349–400 km (217–249 mi) (e-308), WLTP

Dimensions
- Wheelbase: 2,675 mm (105.3 in); 2,732 mm (107.6 in) (SW)
- Length: 4,367 mm (171.9 in); 4,636 mm (182.5 in) (SW)
- Width: 1,852 mm (72.9 in)
- Height: 1,440 mm (56.7 in)

The third-generation 308 was unveiled on March 18, 2021, and launched in May 2021. The vehicle is based on the third-generation of the EMP2 platform which made its wheelbase grow by 55 mm (2.2 in) and is shared with the second generation DS 4 as well as the sixth generation Opel Astra. Peugeot has also reduced its height by 20 mm (0.8 in) to create a sleeker silhouette and to achieve a lower drag coefficient of 0.28. It is also the first vehicle to bear the new Peugeot logo. It went to production on 29 September 2021 and went on sale on the same day.

All variants of the third-generation 308 are equipped with LED headlights complemented by vertical LED daytime running lights. These headlights feature the Peugeot Matrix LED Technology on GT and GT Premium variants. It is also equipped with the Drive Assist pack that adds adaptive cruise control with Stop and Go function, lane keeping assistance, semi-automatic lane change, anticipated speed recommendation, and curve speed adaptation. Other features offered as standard or optional include long-range blind-spot monitoring, 360-degree surround-view parking assistance with four cameras, rear cross-traffic alert, heating for the windscreen and steering wheel, and an E-call+ emergency call function.

It is also offered as a plug-in hybrid producing 180 PS (178 hp; 132 kW). The 225 PS (222 hp; 165 kW) version will also be available on the GT version.

The station wagon version was released in June 2021. A crossover derivative was unveiled in June 2022 as the 408.

A battery electric version called the e-308 was introduced in September 2022. It is equipped by a new generation 54 kWh battery pack, with a chemical composition of 80 per cent nickel, 10 per cent manganese and 10 per cent cobalt.

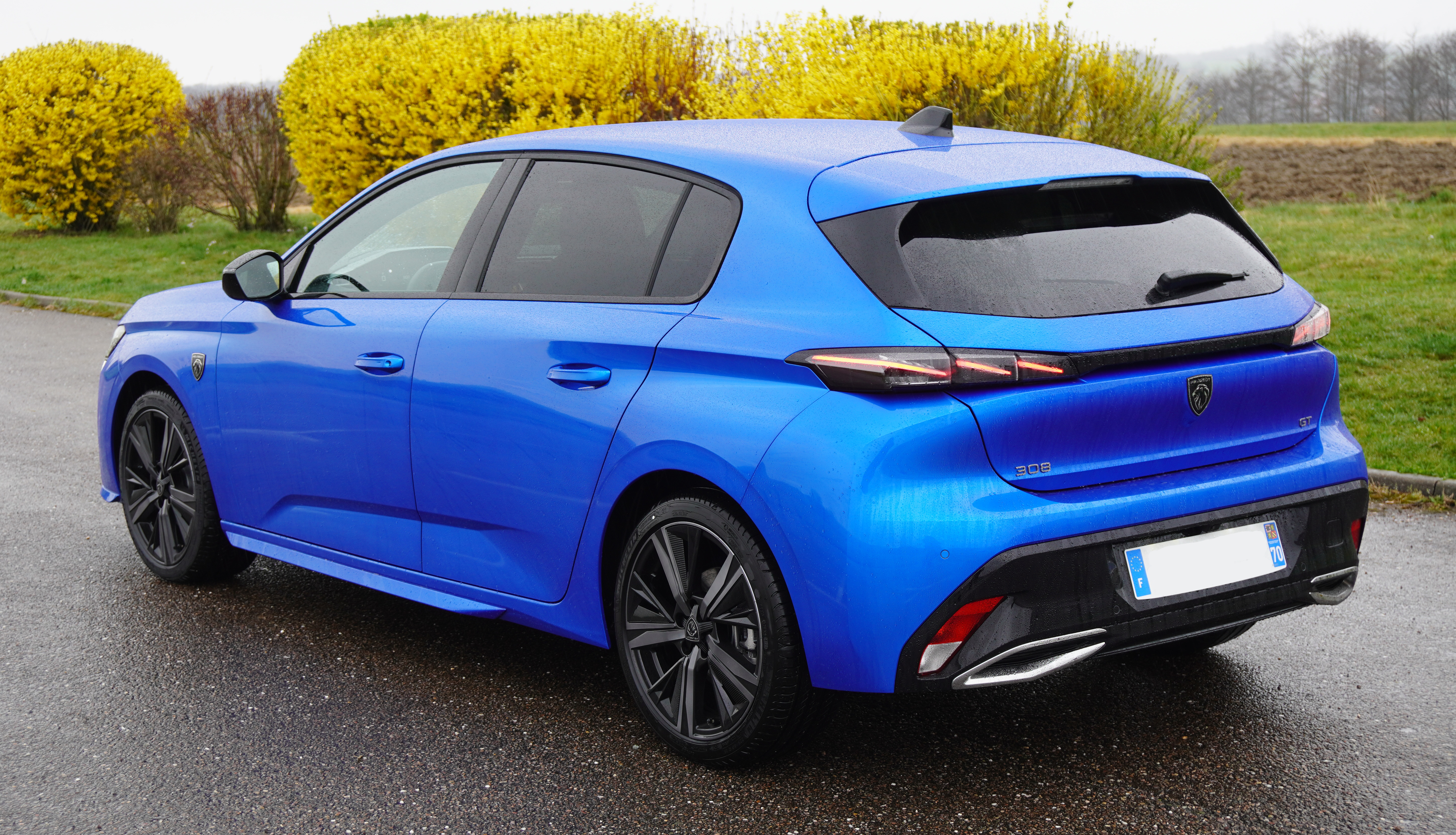
Hatchback (rear view) (pre-facelift)

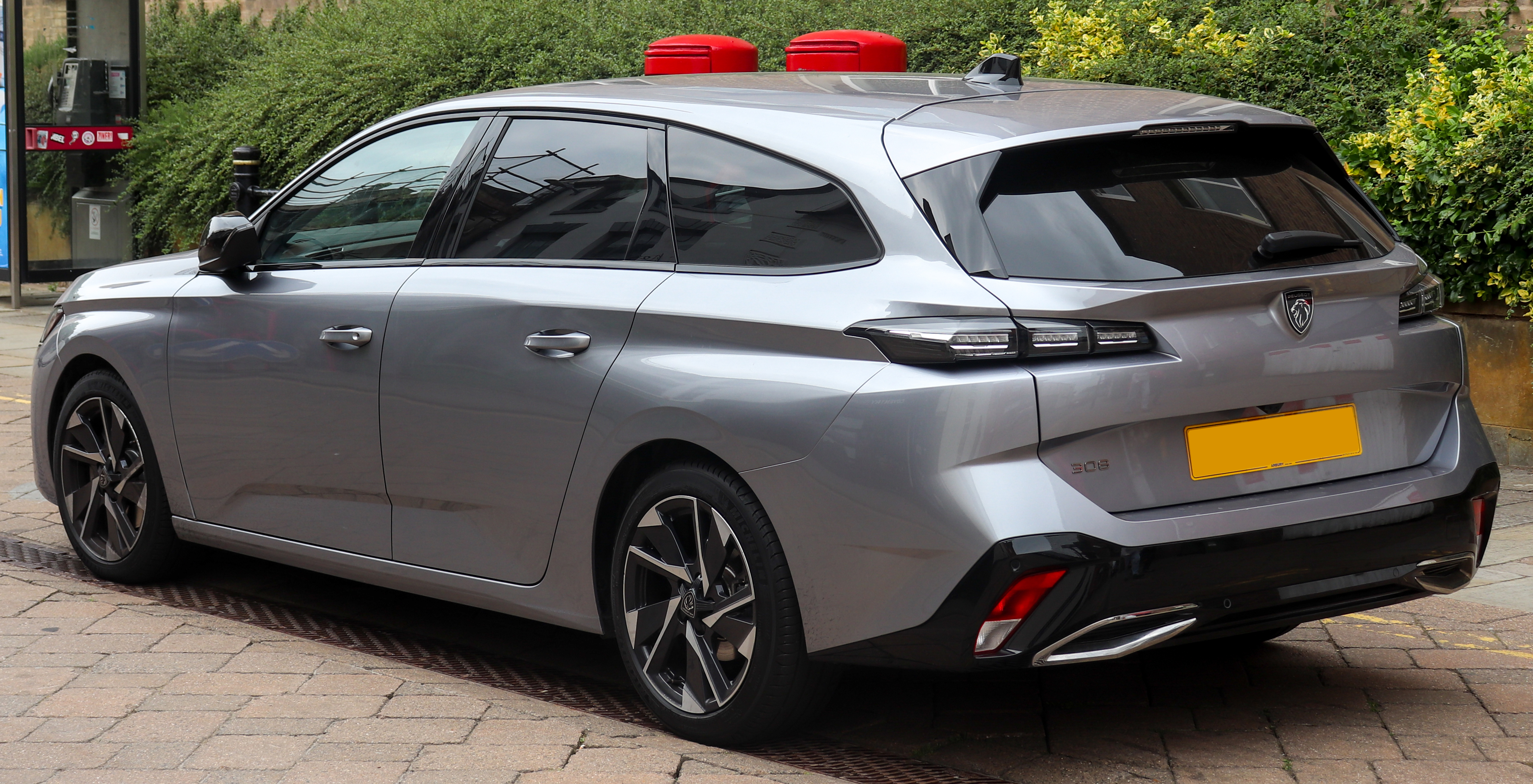
SW (rear view) (pre-facelift)

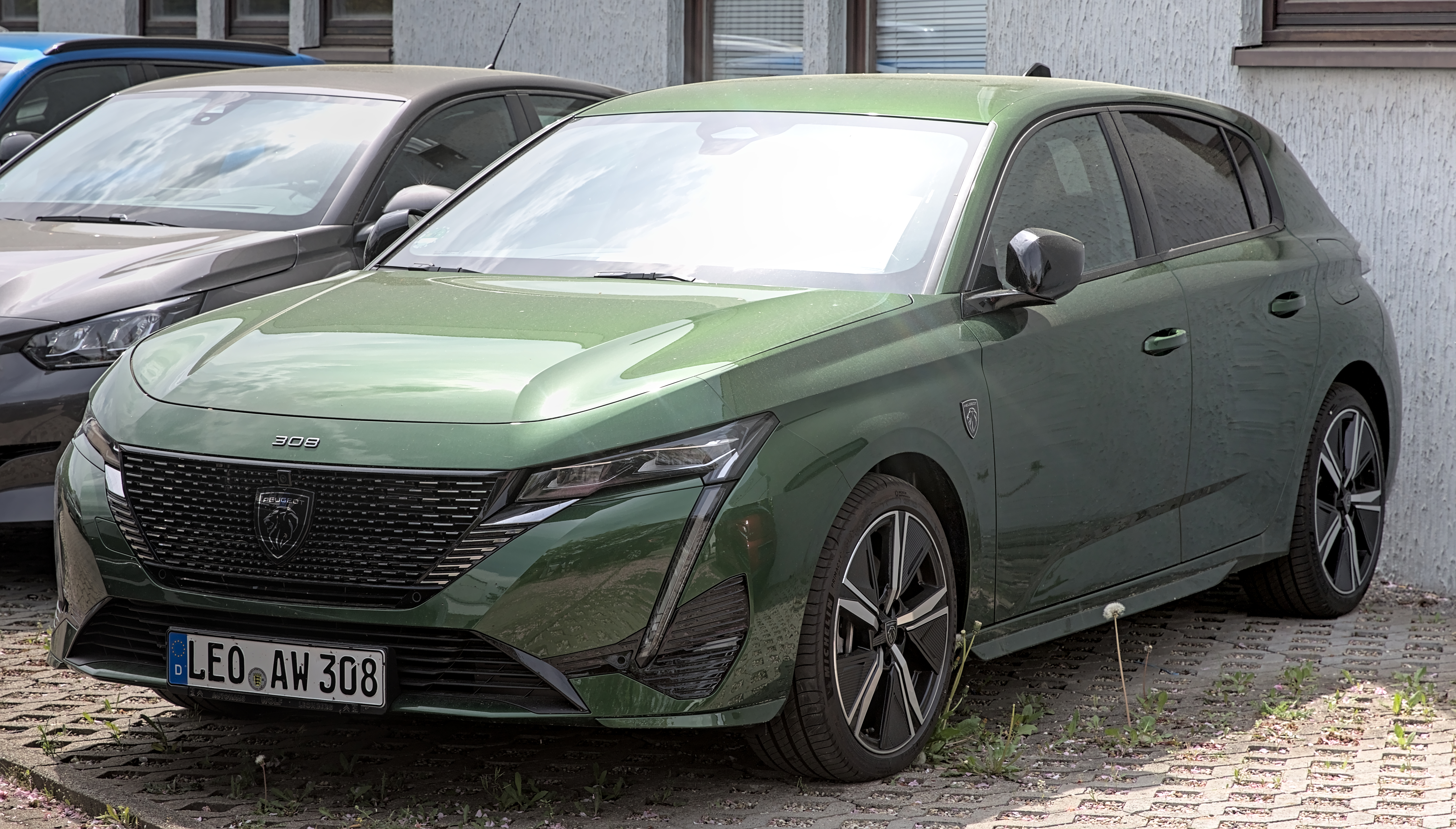
Peugeot 308 Hybrid (pre-facelift)

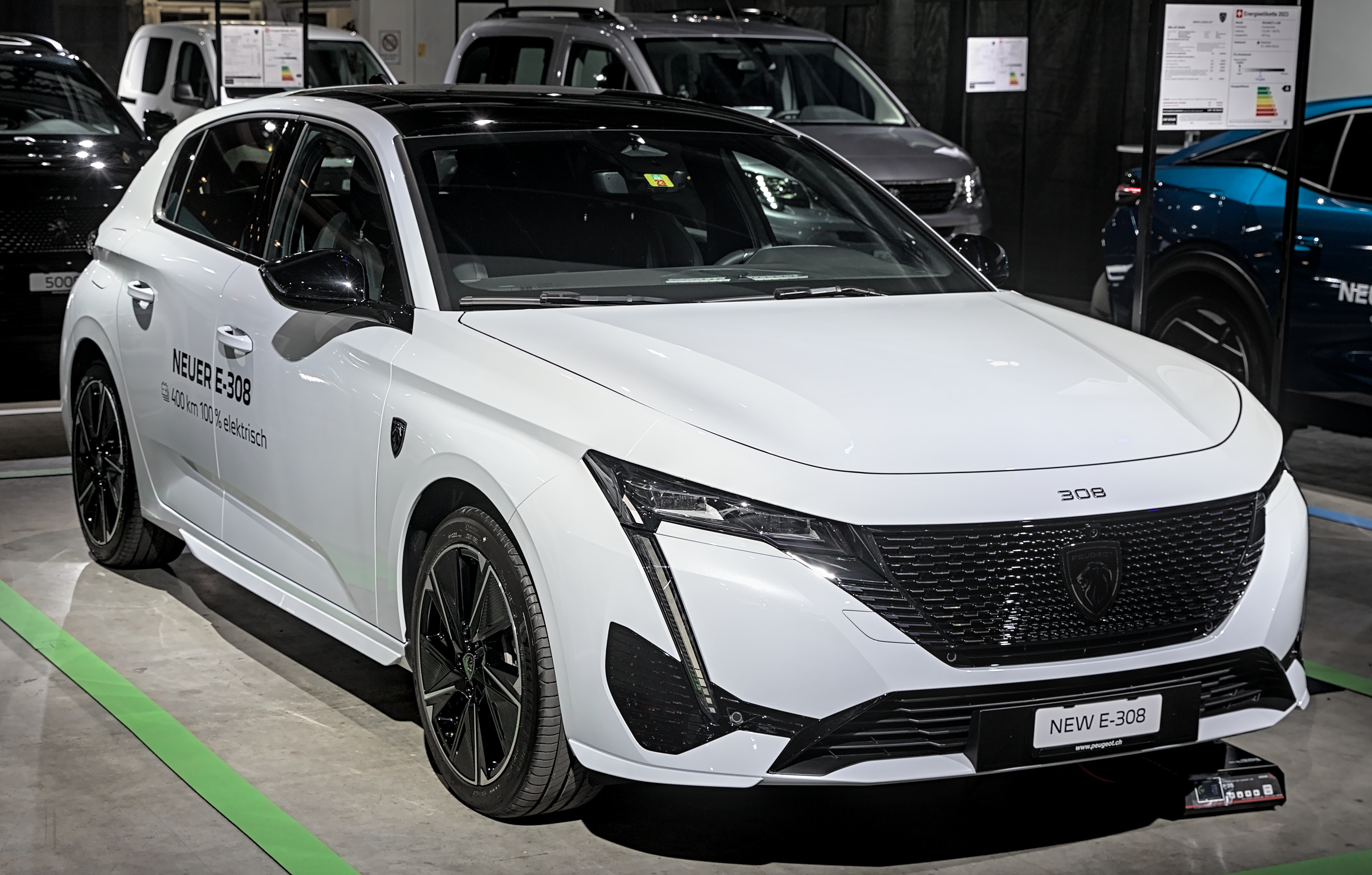
Peugeot e-308 (pre-facelift)

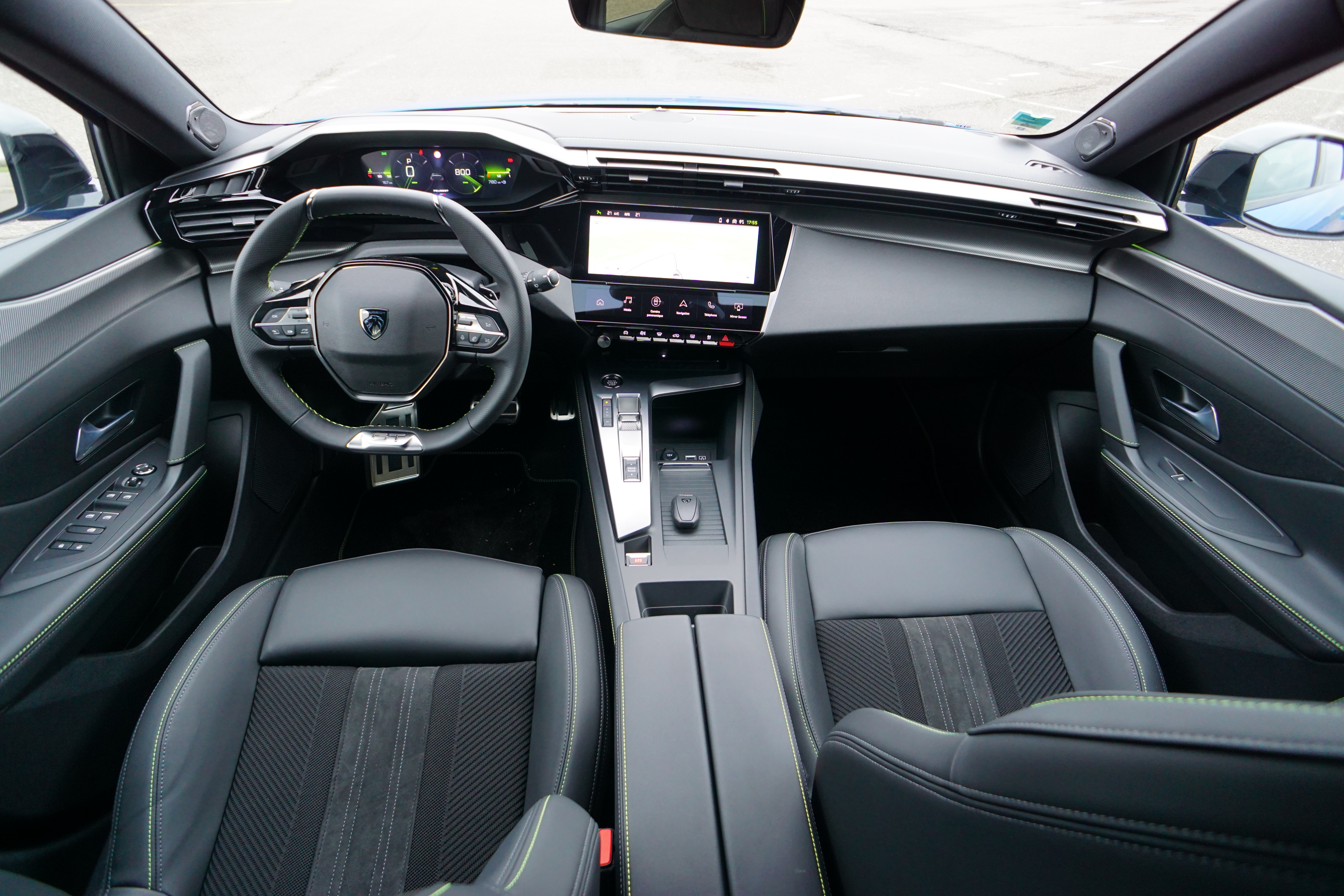
Interior

=== Interior and technology ===
The 308 offers two types of infotainment: the i-Connect system and the more advanced i-Connect Advanced.

=== Facelift (2025) ===
The facelift was unveiled on August 26, 2025. The front-end has been completely redesigned with the current car’s vertical driving light ‘fangs’ replaced a set of three LED ‘claws’ on each side. On higher trim levels, the badge is illuminated, a first for the brand.

Update also inclides new colour options and wheel designs.

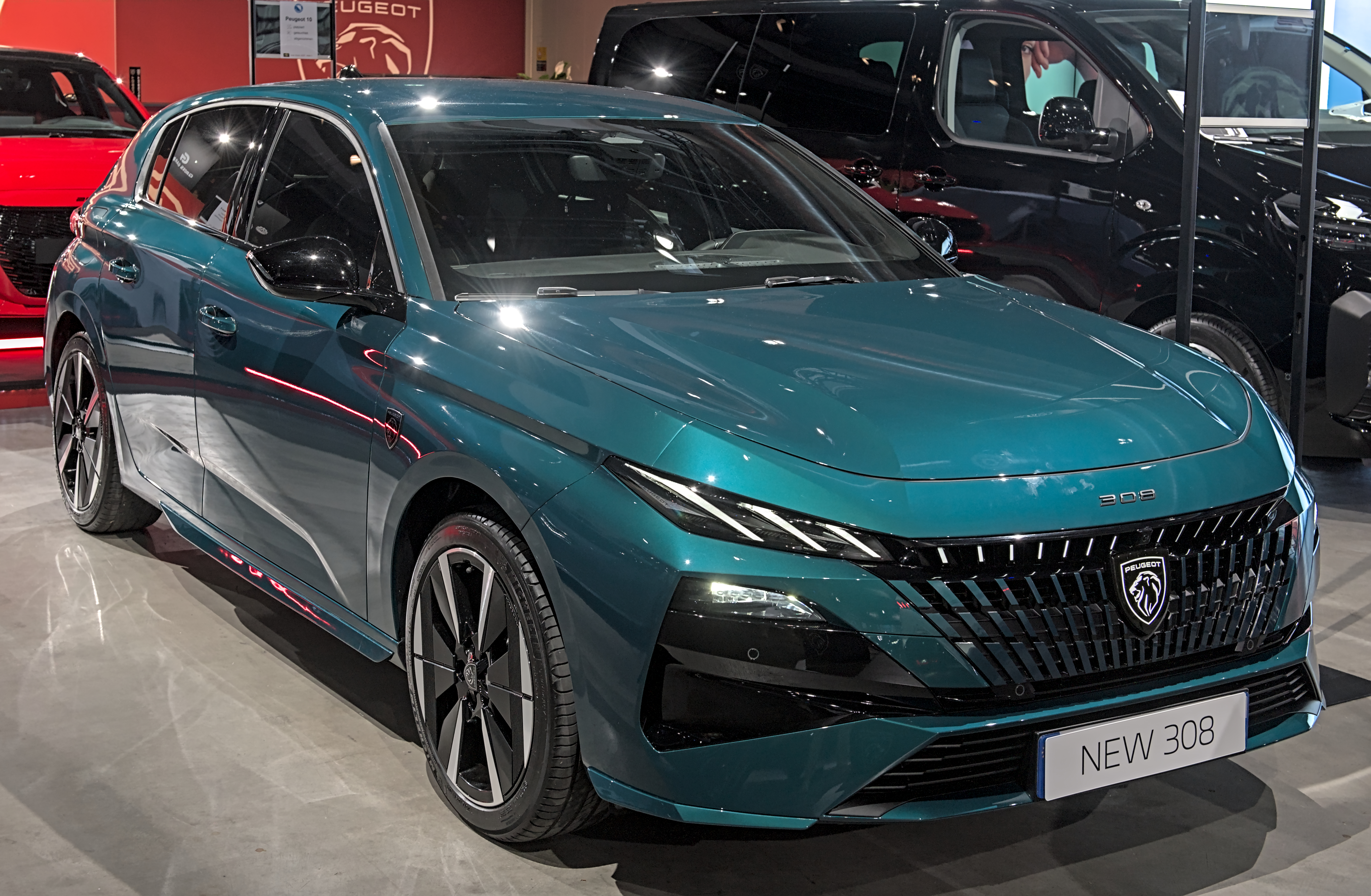
Peugeot e-308 (facelift)

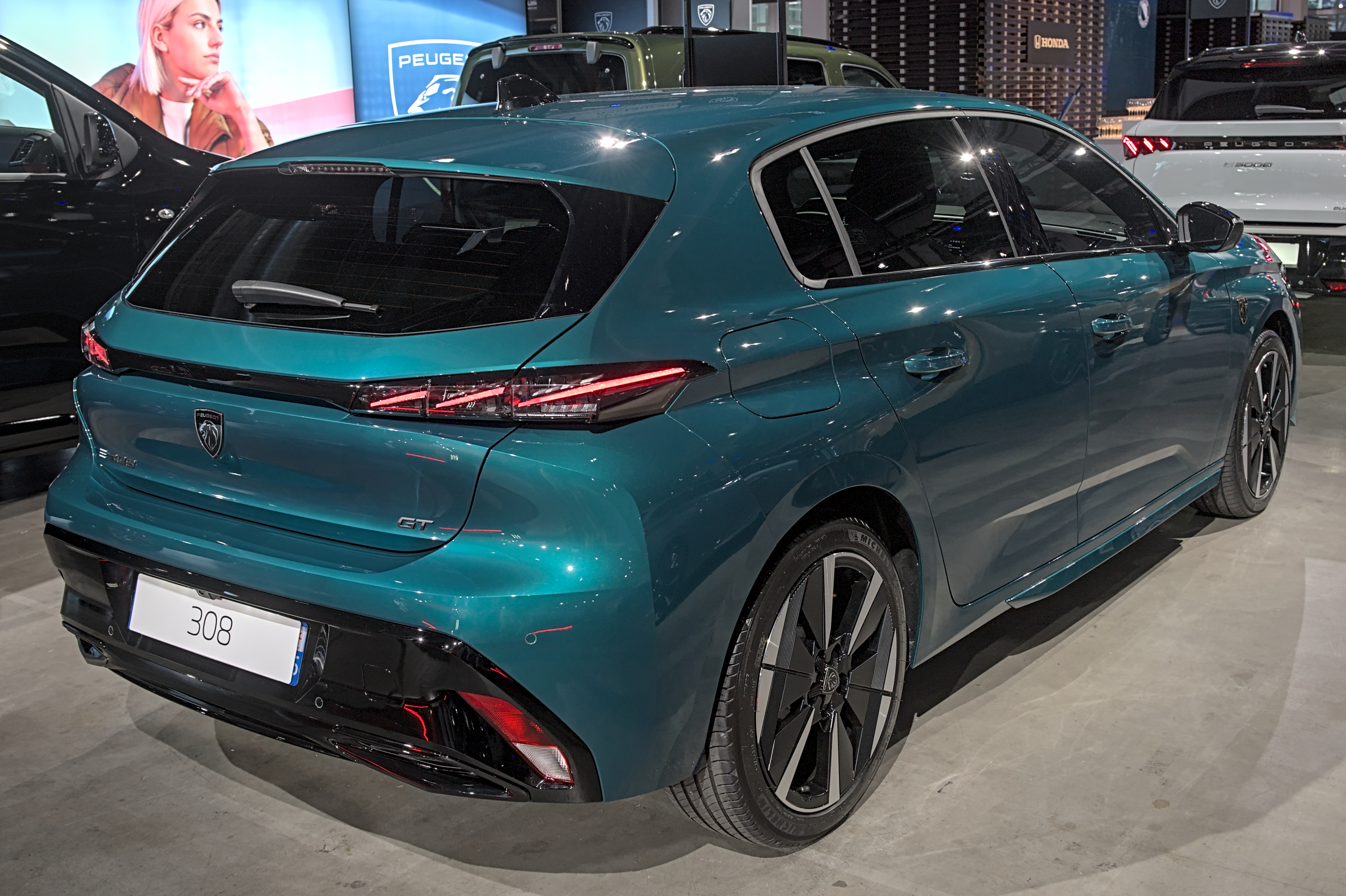
Hatchback (rear view) (facelift)

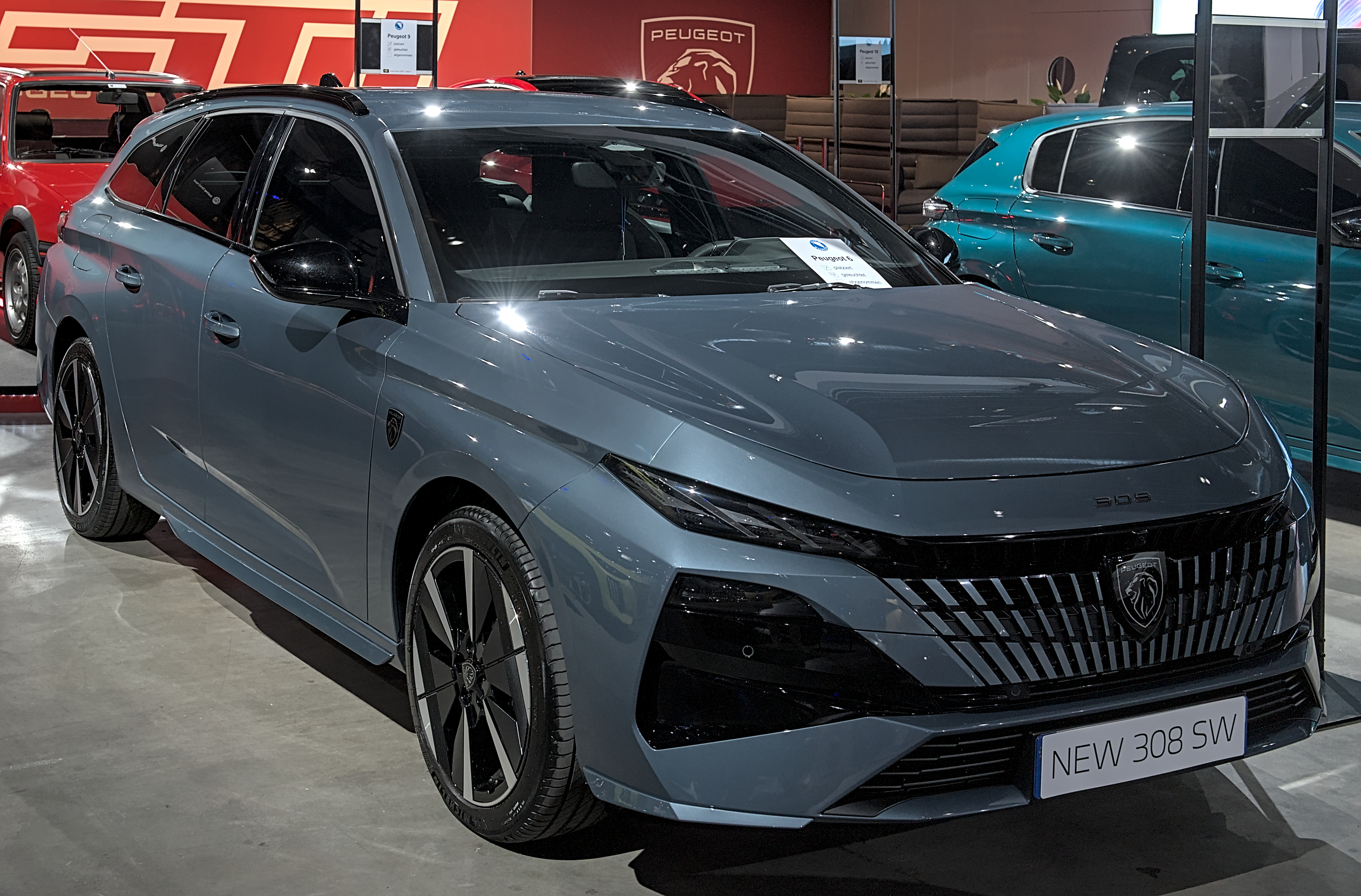
SW (facelift)

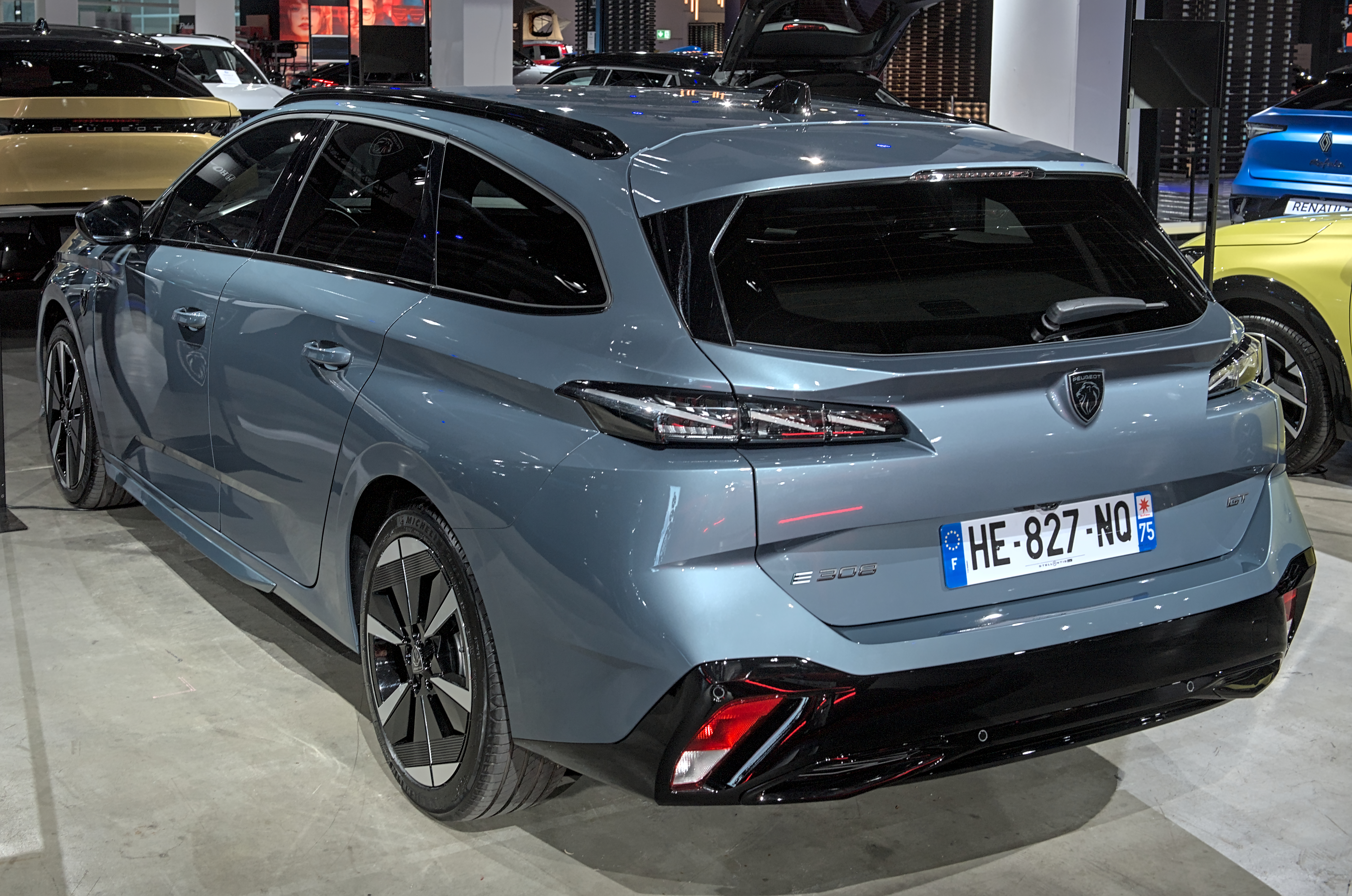
SW (rear view) (facelift)

=== Safety ===
ANCAP test results Peugeot 308 all variants (2022, aligned with Euro NCAP)
Test	Points	%
Overall:	5 /5 stars	
Adult occupant:	30.09	79%
Child occupant:	42.20	86%
Pedestrian:	37.02	68%
Safety assist:	12.37	82%

Euro NCAP test results Peugeot 308 SW PureTech 130 Allure (LHD) (2022)
Test	Points	%
Overall:	4 /5 stars	
Adult occupant:	29.1	76%
Child occupant:	41.3	84%
Pedestrian:	37.0	68%
Safety assist:	10.5	65%

== Sales and production ==
Year	Europe	Brazil	Worldwide Production	Worldwide sales	Notes
2007	43,256	—N/a	106,056	82,500	
2008	231,804	—N/a	304,131	290,100	
2009	225,949	—N/a	233,700	252,100	
2010	180,575	—N/a	226,600	226,200	
2011	155,272	—N/a	201,929	203,998	Total production reaches 1,072,551 units.
2012	119,143	12,016	179,200	184,300	Total production reaches 1,251,700 units.
2013	99,697	10,922			
2014	161,515	5,474			
2015	213,764	3,264			
2016	194,650	2,272			
2017	157,422	965			
2018	153,651	434			
2019	141,060	55			
2020	90,324	1			
2021	53,356	—N/a			
2022	90,160	—N/a			

== Awards ==
In March 2014, the Peugeot 308 was awarded European Car of the Year, in competition with the BMW i3 and Tesla Model S. The Peugeot 308 was also voted Car of the Year by Auto Europa in Italy, by the Italian automotive journalists' association; Car of the Year in Switzerland by Schweizer Illustrierte; and four other magazines.

In 2022, the new Peugeot 308 SW was selected as the 'Company Vehicle of the Year' at the Automobile Awards.
