= Citroën C4 Picasso =

Compact multi-purpose vehicle manufactured by Citroën

Citroën C4 Picasso/SpaceTourer
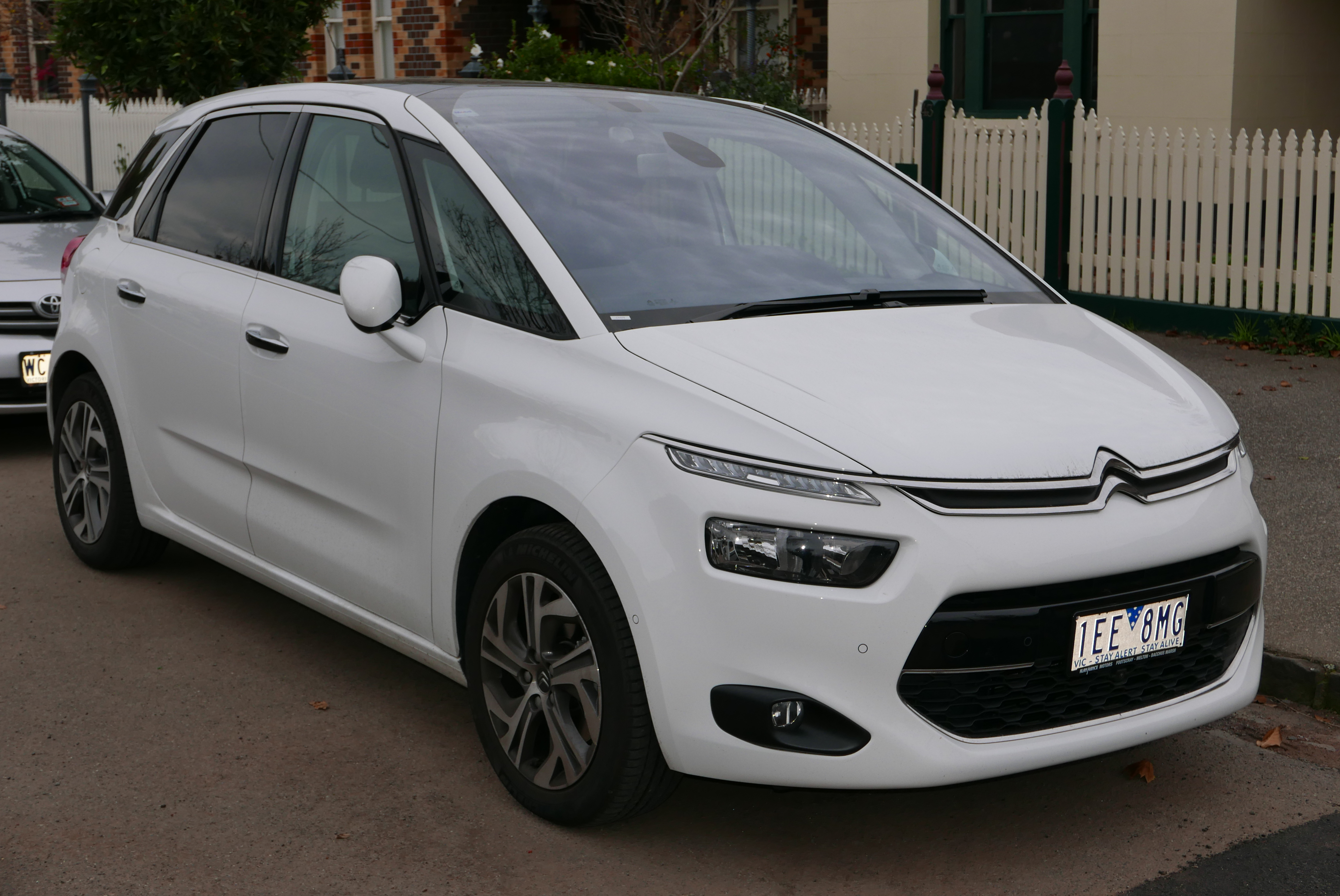

Overview
- Manufacturer: Citroën (Note: PSA Group (2006–2021); Stellantis (2021–present))
- Also called: Citroën C4 Picasso (until 2018); Citroën Grand C4 Picasso (seven-seater until 2018); Citroën Grand C4 SpaceTourer (seven-seater)
- Production: 2006–2022

Chronology
- Predecessor: Citroën Xsara Picasso; Citroën Xsara Estate; Citroën C8
- Successor: Citroën C5 Aircross (for five-seater); Citroën ë-Berlingo XL (for seven-seater); Citroën ë-SpaceTourer (for seven-seater)

The Citroën C4 SpaceTourer (formerly the Citroën C4 Picasso) is a five-seater car produced by French manufacturer Citroën with a seven-seater version called the Grand C4 SpaceTourer (formerly the Grand C4 Picasso) also available. It has a five-door compact multi-purpose vehicle (MPV) bodystyle. The seven seat Grand C4 Picasso made its debut first, at the Paris Motor Show in September 2006, followed by the five seat version in January 2007.

The first-generation C4 Picasso and Grand C4 Picasso were designed by Donato Coco for the French manufacturer Citroën and share the same platform and engines with the Citroën C4 and the Peugeot 307.

Both the C4 Picasso and Grand C4 Picasso are produced at the PSA Vigo Plant in Spain.

== First generation (2006–2013) ==
First generation
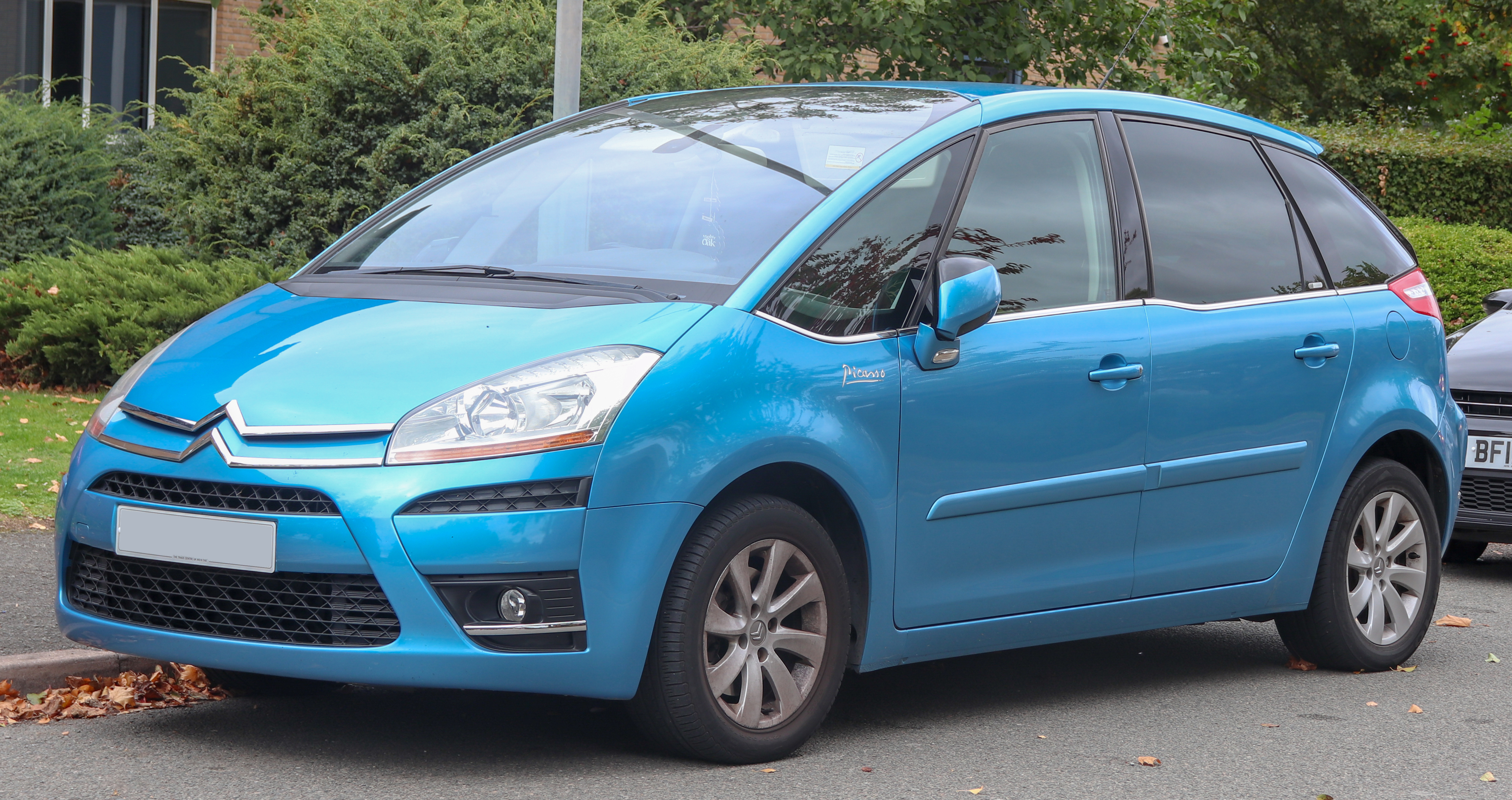

Overview
- Manufacturer: Citroën
- Also called: Citroën Grand C4 Picasso
- Production: November 2006 – March 2013 (7-Seater); 2007–2013 (5-Seater)
- Assembly: Spain: Vigo (PSA Vigo Plant)
- Designer: Donato Coco

Body and chassis
- Class: Compact MPV (M)
- Body style: 5-door MPV
- Layout: Front-engine, front-wheel drive
- Platform: PSA PF2 platform
- Related: Citroën C3 Picasso; Citroën C4 / Aircross

Powertrain
- Engine: Petrol: 1.6-litre I4; 1.8-litre I4; 2.0-litre I4; Diesel: 1.6-litre I4; 2.0-litre I4
- Transmission: 4-speed automatic 5-speed manual 6-speed automatic 6-speed manual

Dimensions
- Wheelbase: 2,730 mm (107.5 in)
- Length: C4 Picasso: 4,470 mm (176.0 in); Grand C4 Picasso: 4,590 mm (180.7 in)
- Width: 1,830 mm (72.0 in)
- Height: 1,690 mm (66.5 in)

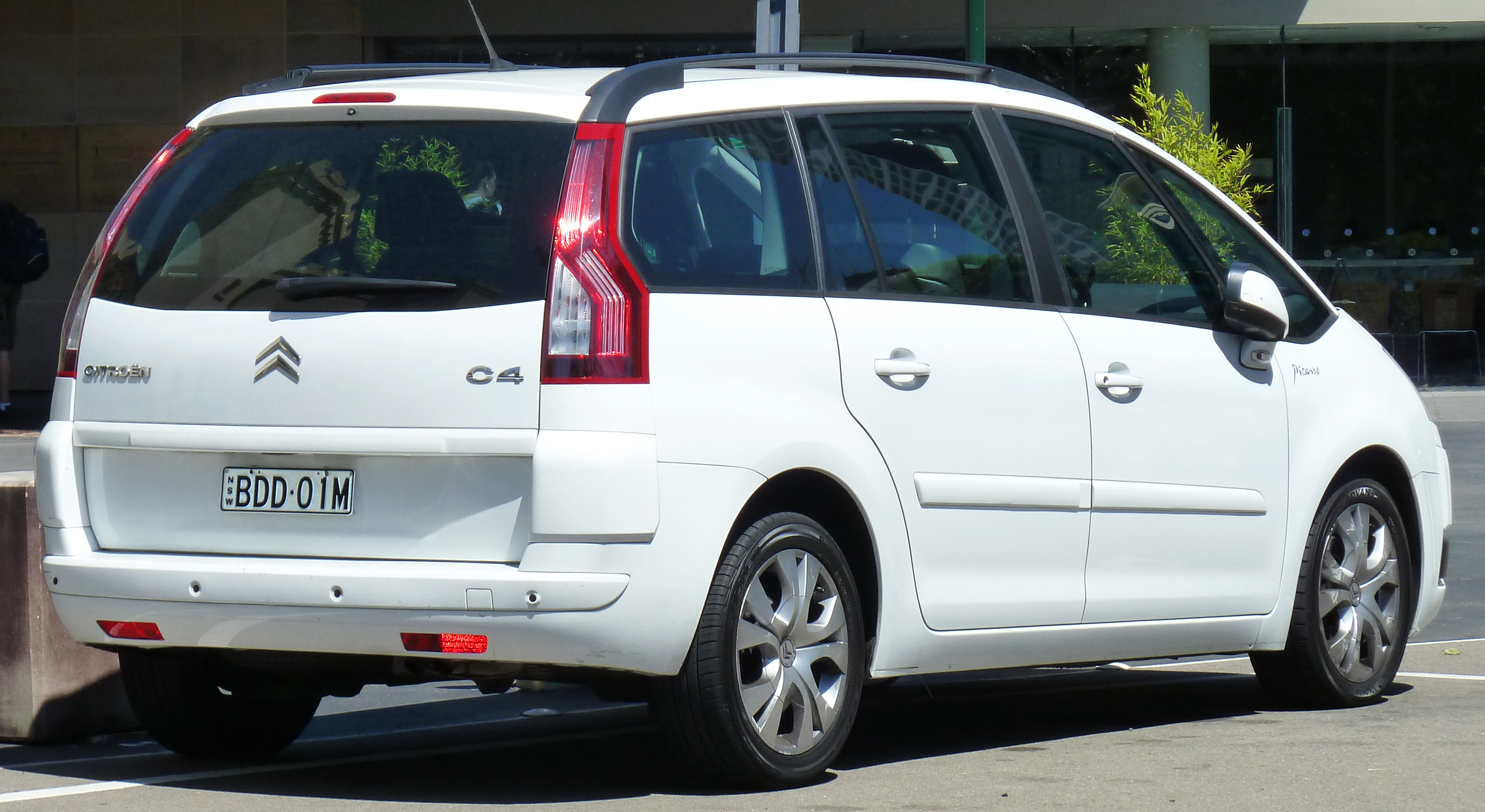
Citroën Grand C4 Picasso (Australia; pre-facelift)

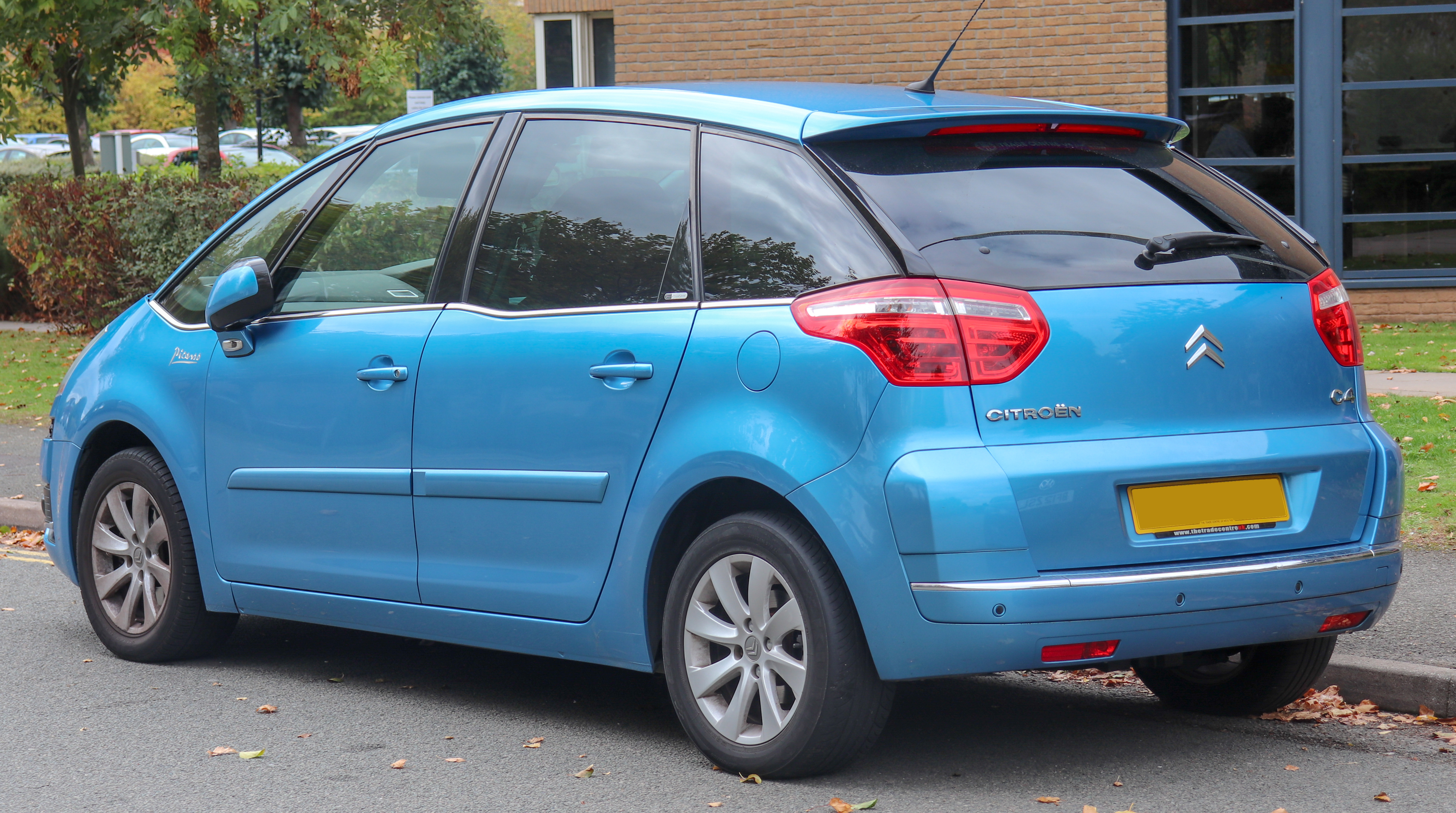
Citroen C4 Picasso (Europe; pre-facelift)

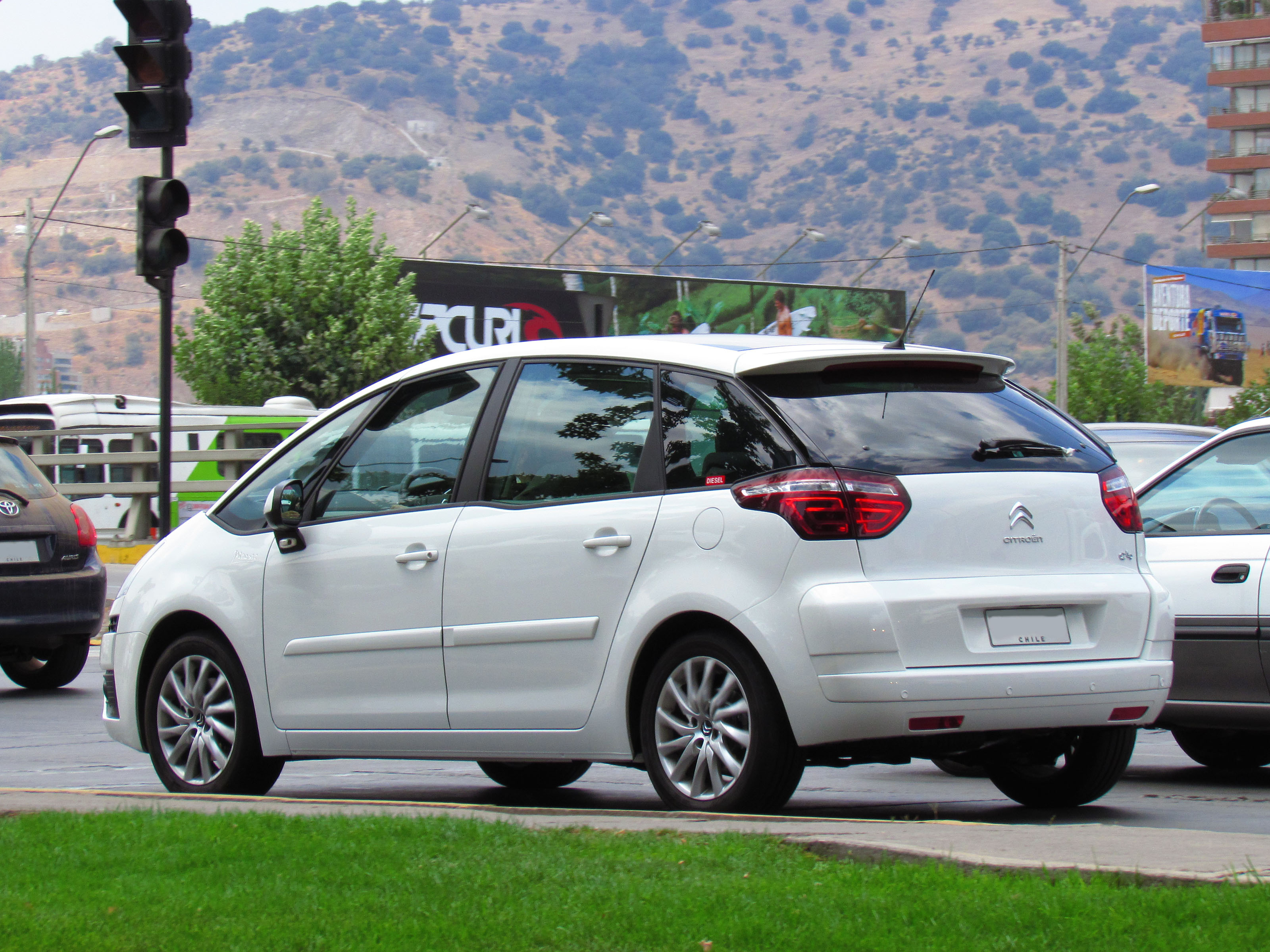
Citroen C4 Picasso (facelift)

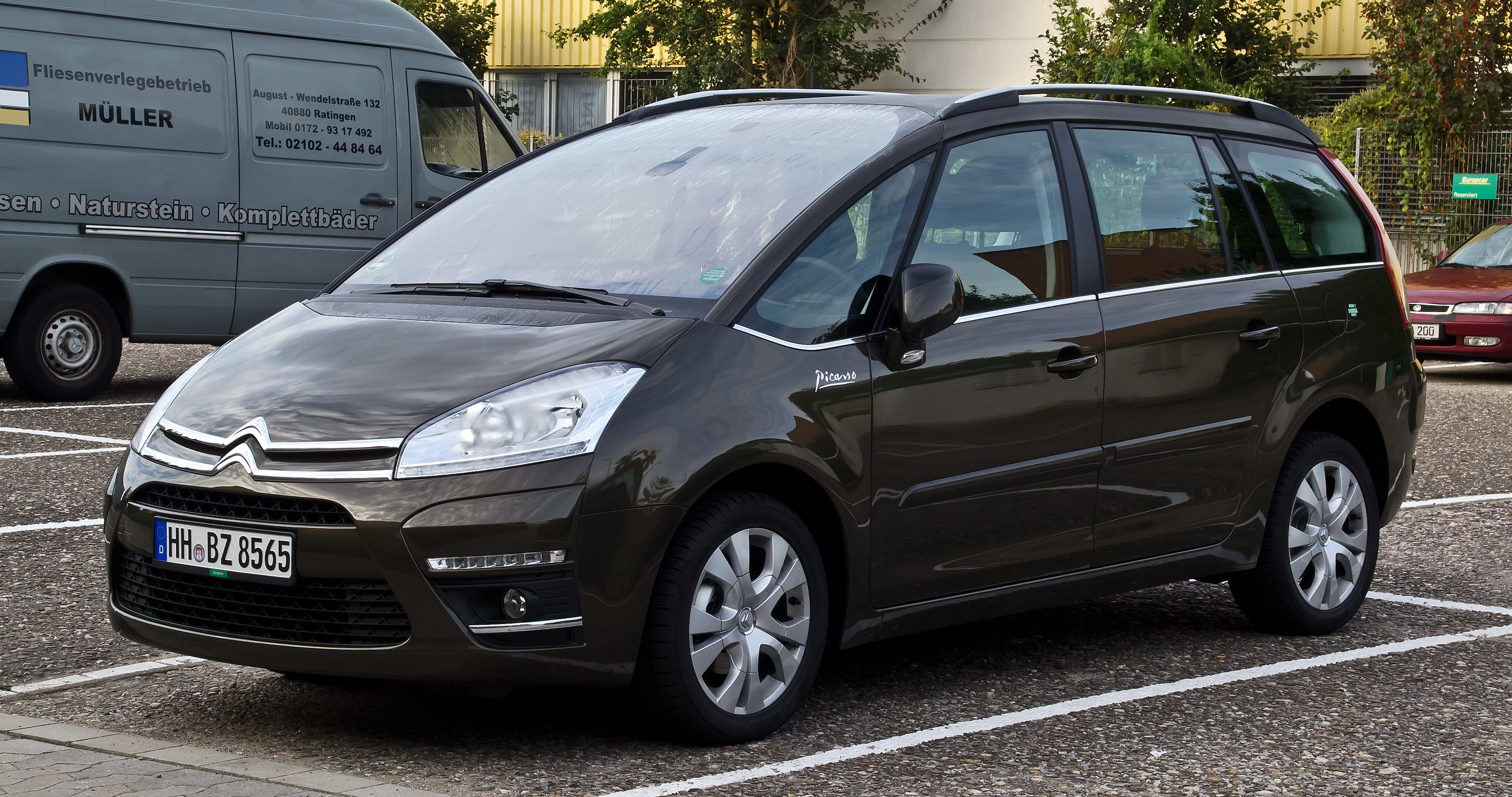
Citroën Grand C4 Picasso (Germany; facelift)

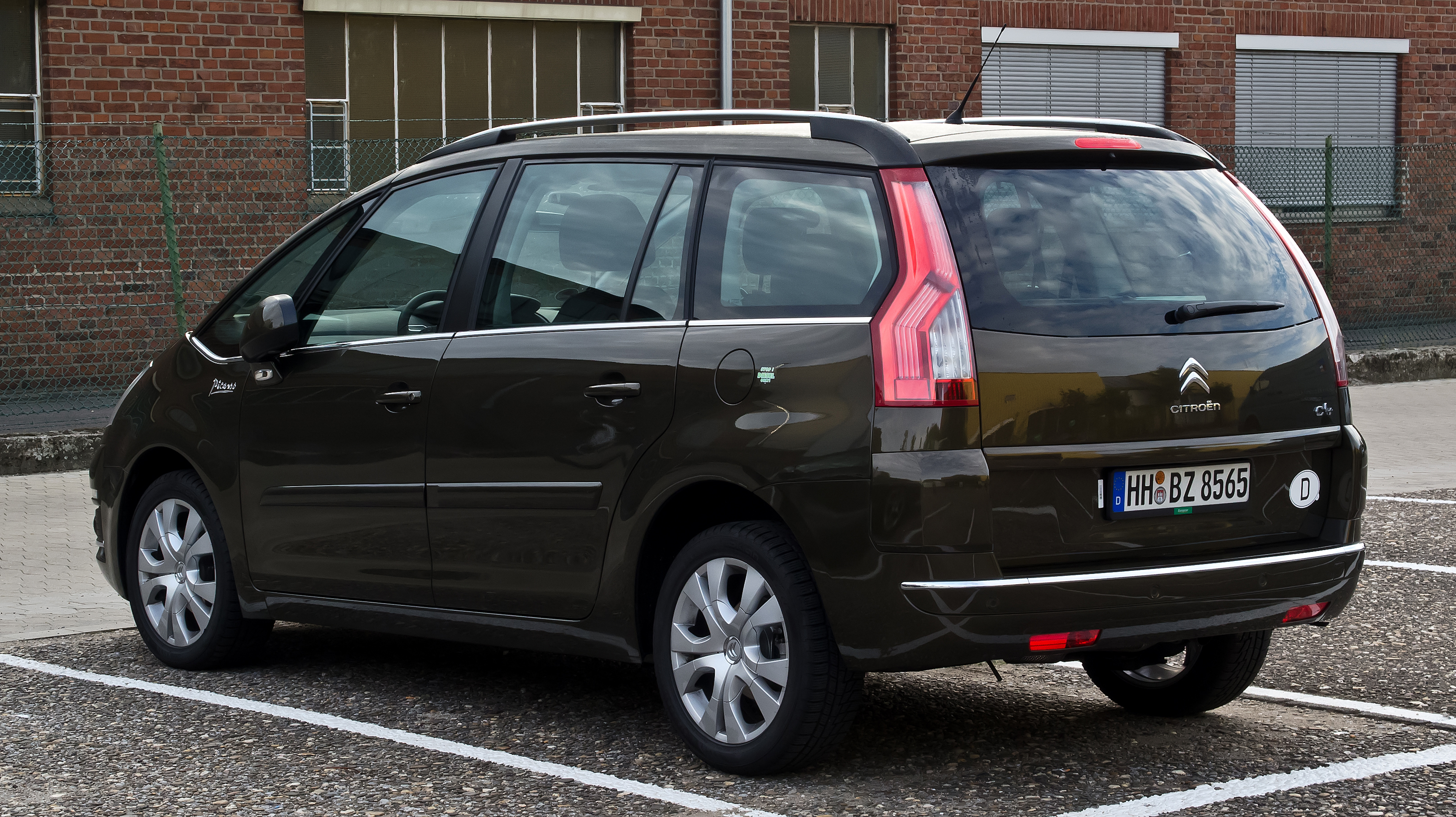
Citroën Grand C4 Picasso (Germany; facelift)

The first generation Grand C4 Picasso, a seven seater, was launched in November 2006 and produced until March 2013, when the second generation took over. The vehicle shares the same platform and range of engines as the Citroën C4 and Peugeot 307. The car was officially revealed in the Paris Motor Show on 30 September 2006.

The five seater C4 Picasso was officially unveiled early in January 2007, launched in February, and was displayed at the Geneva Motor Show in March.

Both vehicles featured a large panoramic windscreen and thin door pillars, to enhance the driver's field of vision, eliminate blind spots, and increase the amount of light inside the front cabin. In addition to the front sun visors, both vehicles have two blinds attached to further reduce glare and unwelcome lights for the driver and front passenger.

The Grand C4 Picasso was slightly larger than its nearest seven seat MPV competitors, like the Mazda5 and Opel/Vauxhall Zafira, and smaller than earlier large MPVs such as the Citroën Evasion and Opel Sintra.

The vehicle has five hundred litres of boot capacity and 1,951 litres with all rear seats down.

Rear parking sensors were available only on the Exclusive trim.

A pneumatic rear suspension is available as an option, which make the ride smoother and can lower the sill. In some markets, this option is only available on higher trim levels.

=== Safety ===
ANCAP test results* Citroen C4 Grand Picasso variant(s) as tested (2006)
| Test | Score |
|---|---|
| Overall | 5 /5 stars |
| Frontal offset | 14.86/16 |
| Side impact | 15.83/16 |
| Pole | 2/2 |
| Seat belt reminders | 2/3 |
| Whiplash protection | Not Assessed |
| Pedestrian protection | Marginal |
| Electronic stability control | Standard |

The first generation C4 Picasso to be tested by the European New Car Assessment Programme (Euro NCAP) was a LHD model from 2006. It received an overall five star rating due to the design and range of default safety features, including: front airbags for the driver and passenger, a driver's knee airbag, side body airbags, and side head airbags.

The vehicle was penalised in the crash tests for the risk of leg injuries caused by the dashboard, and for chest injuries to the driver in a side impact. In the front impact test the child restraint in the back seat tipped forward, striking the dummy infant's head on the driver's seat, and lost all head protection points for the dummy.

Euro NCAP test results* First generation (LHD) (2006)
| Test | Score | Rating |
|---|---|---|
| Adult occupant: | 35 | 5 /5 stars |
| Child occupant: | 34 | 3 /5 stars |
| Pedestrian: | 16 | 2 /4 stars |

Euro NCAP test results* First generation retest (LHD) (2009)
| Test | Points | % |
|---|---|---|
| Overall: | 5 /5 stars | |
| Adult occupant: | 31 | 87% |
| Child occupant: | 38 | 78% |
| Pedestrian: | 16 | 46% |
| Safety assist: | 6 | 89% |

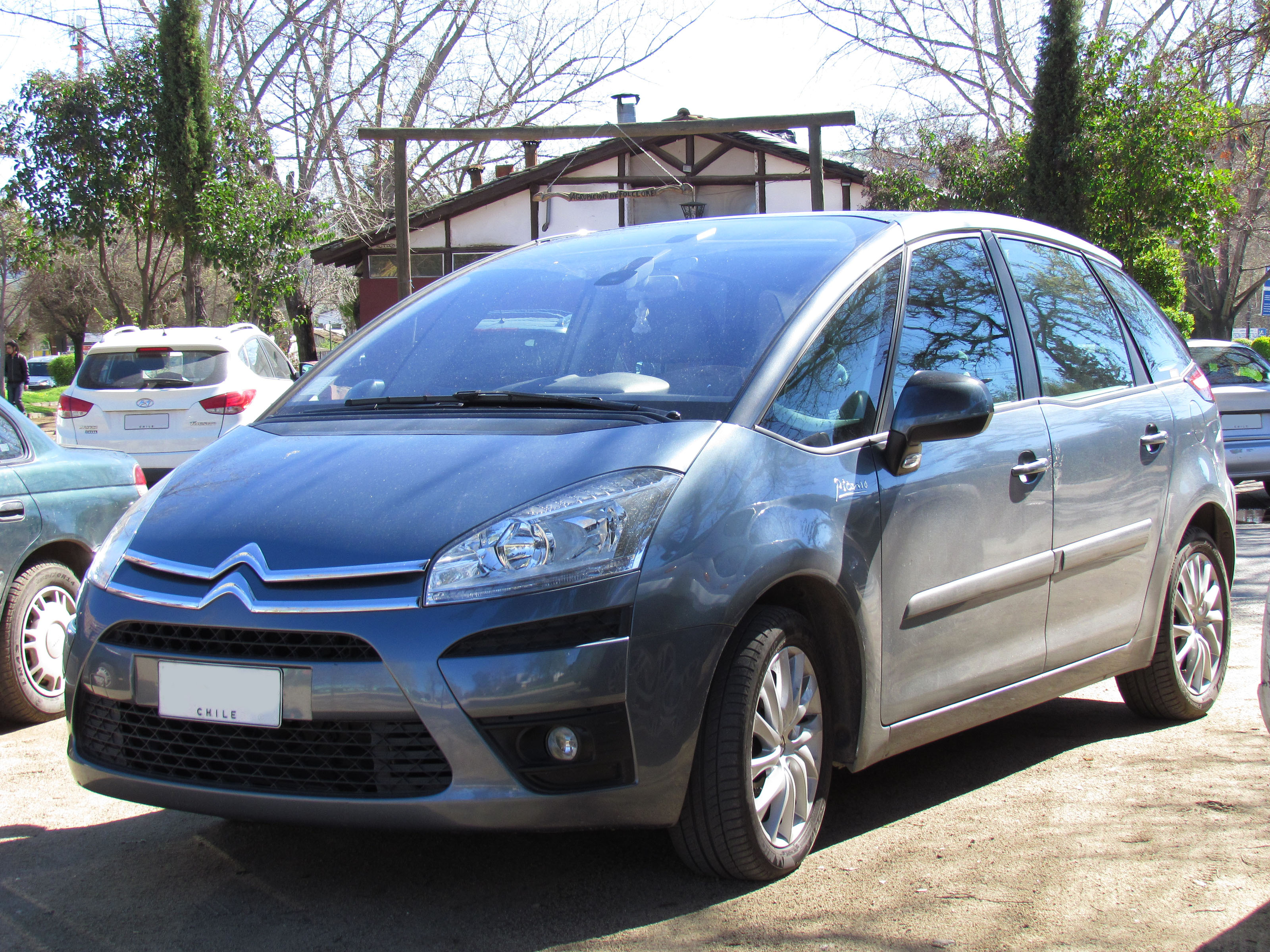
Citroën C4 Picasso (facelift)

=== Reliability ===
Scoring 111 points on the United Kingdom Reliability Index.

The average age and repair cost of the tested C4 Picassos was 40 months and £325. 58.62% of the repair costs were attributed to the axles and suspension, while air conditioning and transmission repairs were rare and featured at the bottom of the list at 0% each.

Between October 2010 to September 2011, the MOT test pass rate for the C4 Picasso was 71.2%, compared to the 56.8% average for all Citroën vehicles. Service intervals are every 12,500–20,000 miles (depending on engine) or 2 years, whichever happens first.

== Second generation (2013–2022) ==
Second generation
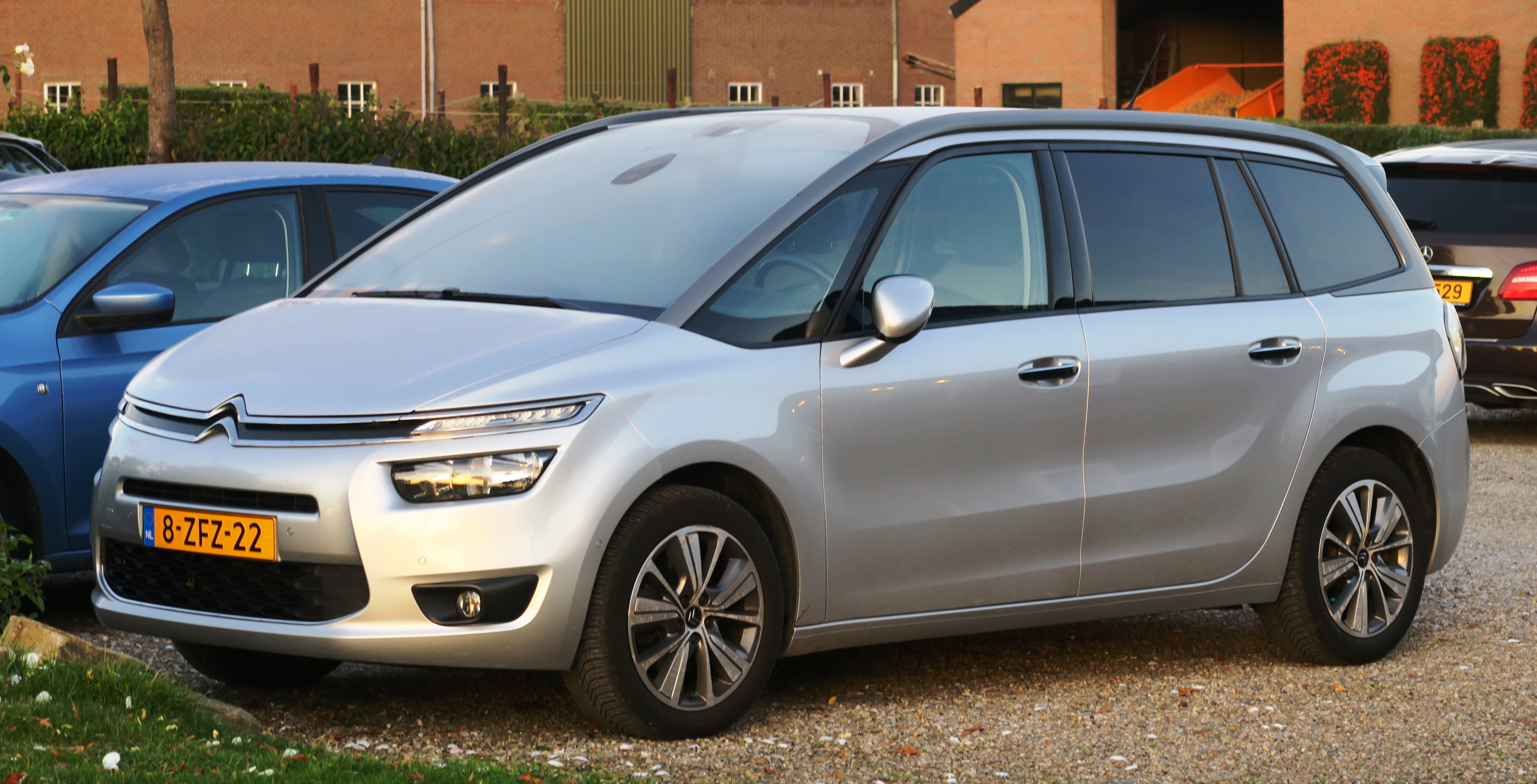

Overview
- Manufacturer: Citroën
- Also called: Citroën Grand C4 Picasso (until 2018); Citroën C4 SpaceTourer (2018–2020); Citroën Grand C4 SpaceTourer (2018–2022)
- Production: 2013–2020 (5-Seater); 2013–2022 (7-Seater)
- Assembly: Spain: Vigo (PSA Vigo Plant); Malaysia: Gurun (NAM)
- Designer: Frédéric Soubirou (C4 Picasso exterior); Olivier Vincent (Grand C4 Picasso exterior)

Body and chassis
- Class: Compact MPV (M)
- Body style: 5-door MPV
- Layout: Front-engine, front-wheel drive
- Platform: PSA EMP2 platform

Powertrain
- Engine: Petrol: 1.2 L EB2 I3; 1.6 L EP6 I4; 1.8 L EW7 I4; 2.0 L EW10 I4; Diesel: 1.5 L BlueHDI; 1.6 L DV6 I4; 2.0 L DW10 I4
- Transmission: 5-speed manual 6-speed manual 6-speed automatic 8-speed automatic (Grand C4 SpaceTourer, 2018)

Dimensions
- Wheelbase: 2,785 or 2,840 mm (109.6 or 111.8 in)
- Length: 4,428 or 4,600 mm (174.3 or 181.1 in)
- Width: 1,826 mm (71.9 in)
- Height: 1,610 or 1,625 mm (63.4 or 64.0 in)

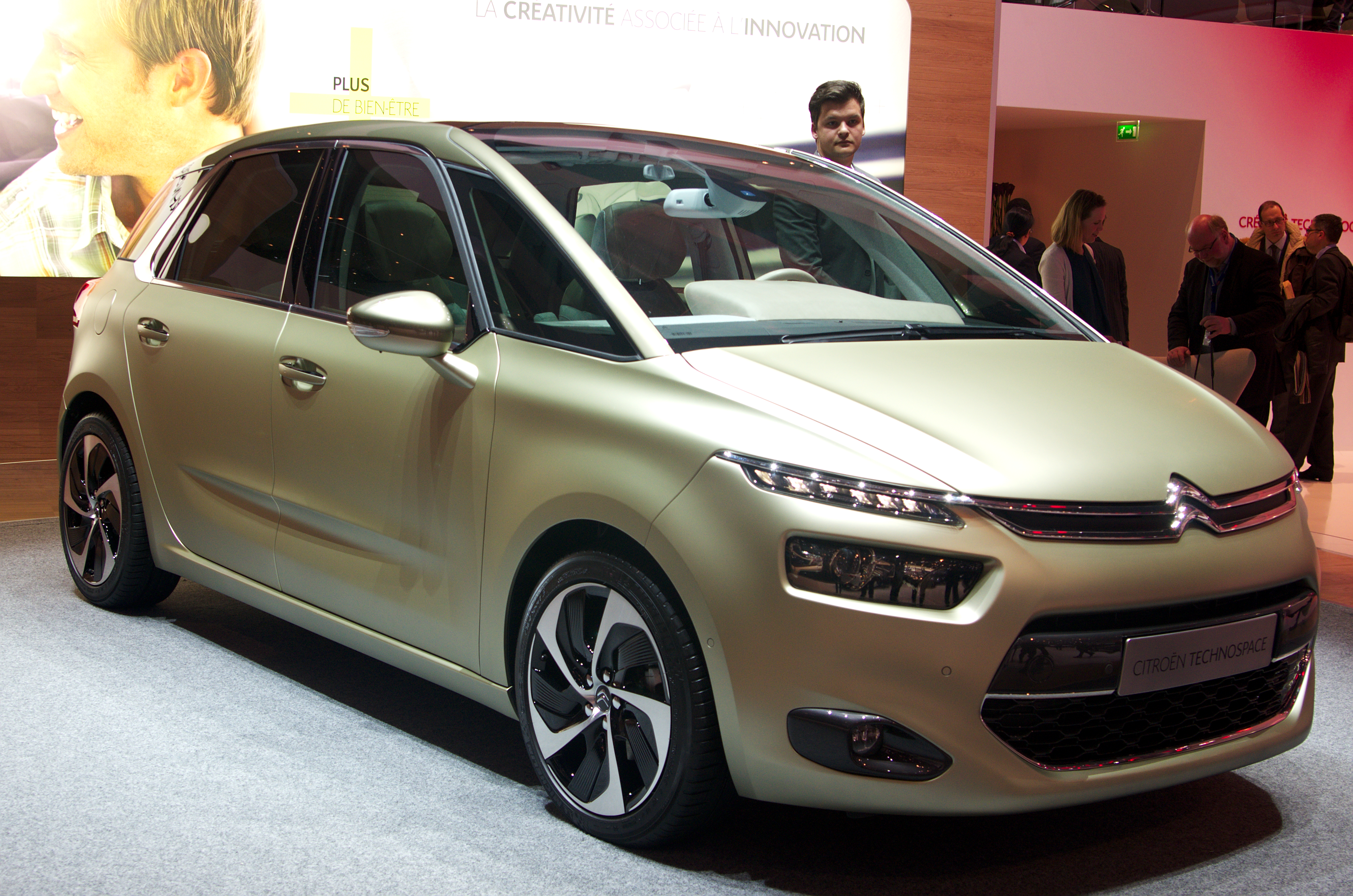
Citroën Technospace Concept

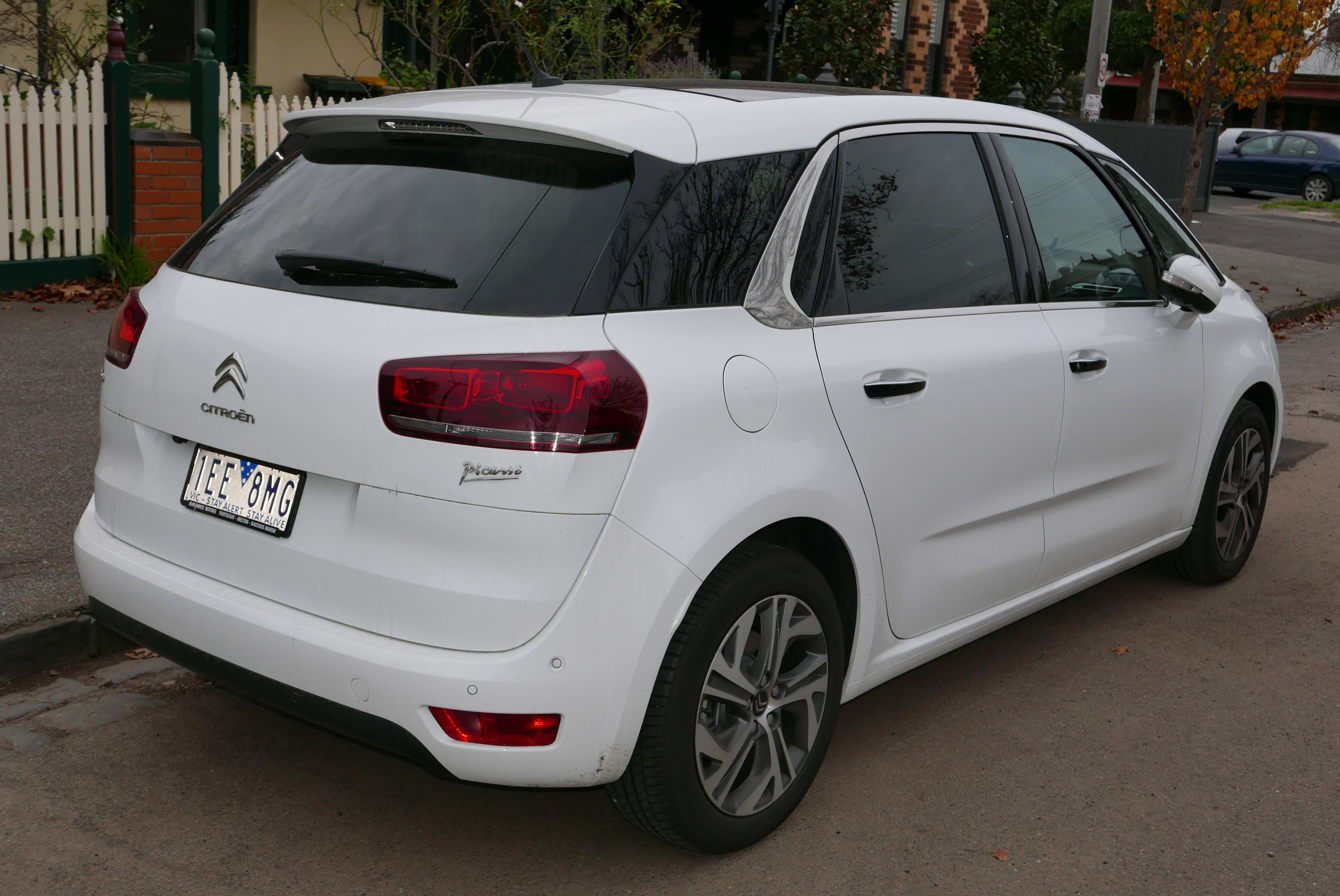
Citroën C4 Picasso (pre-facelift)

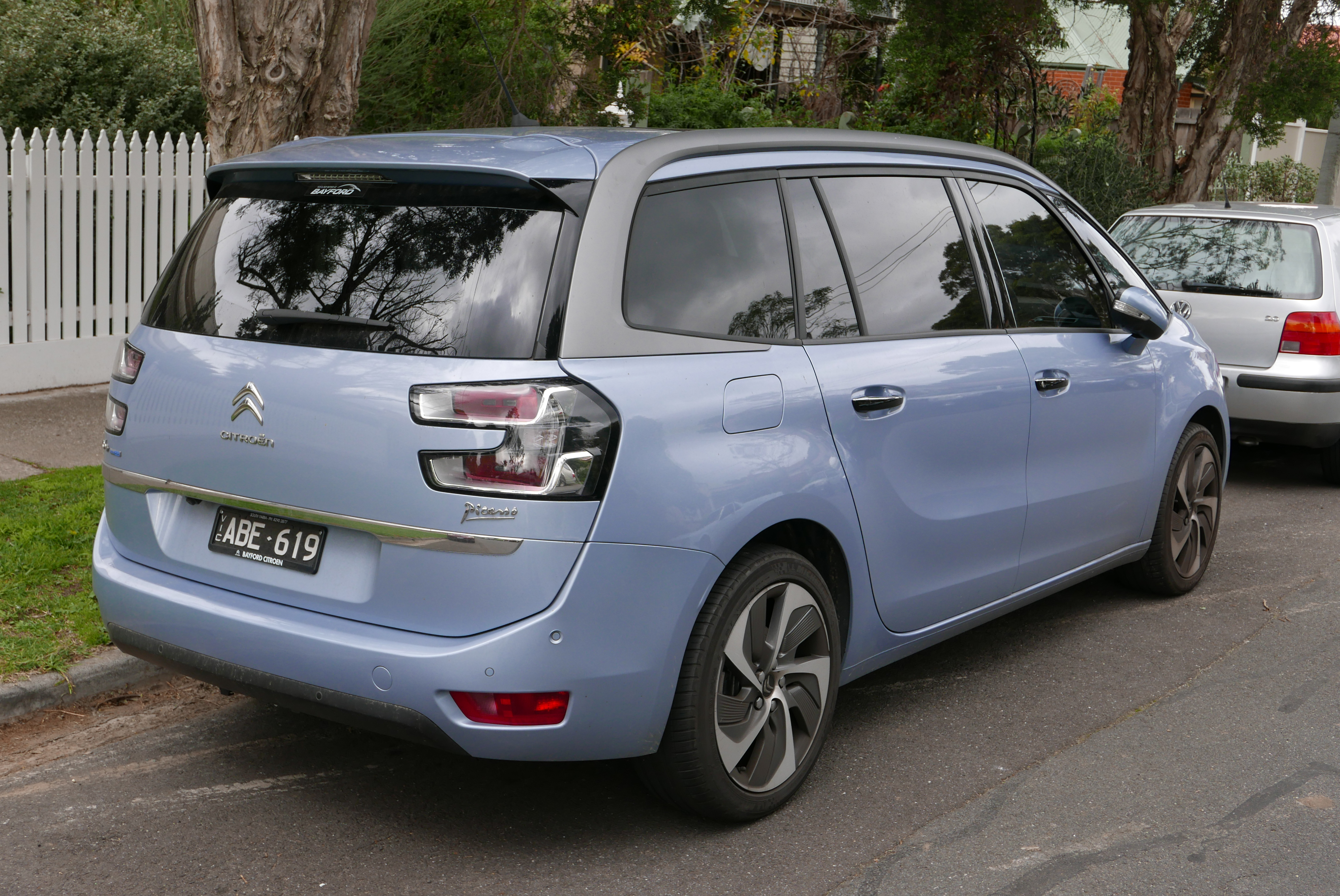
Citroën Grand C4 Picasso (pre-facelift)

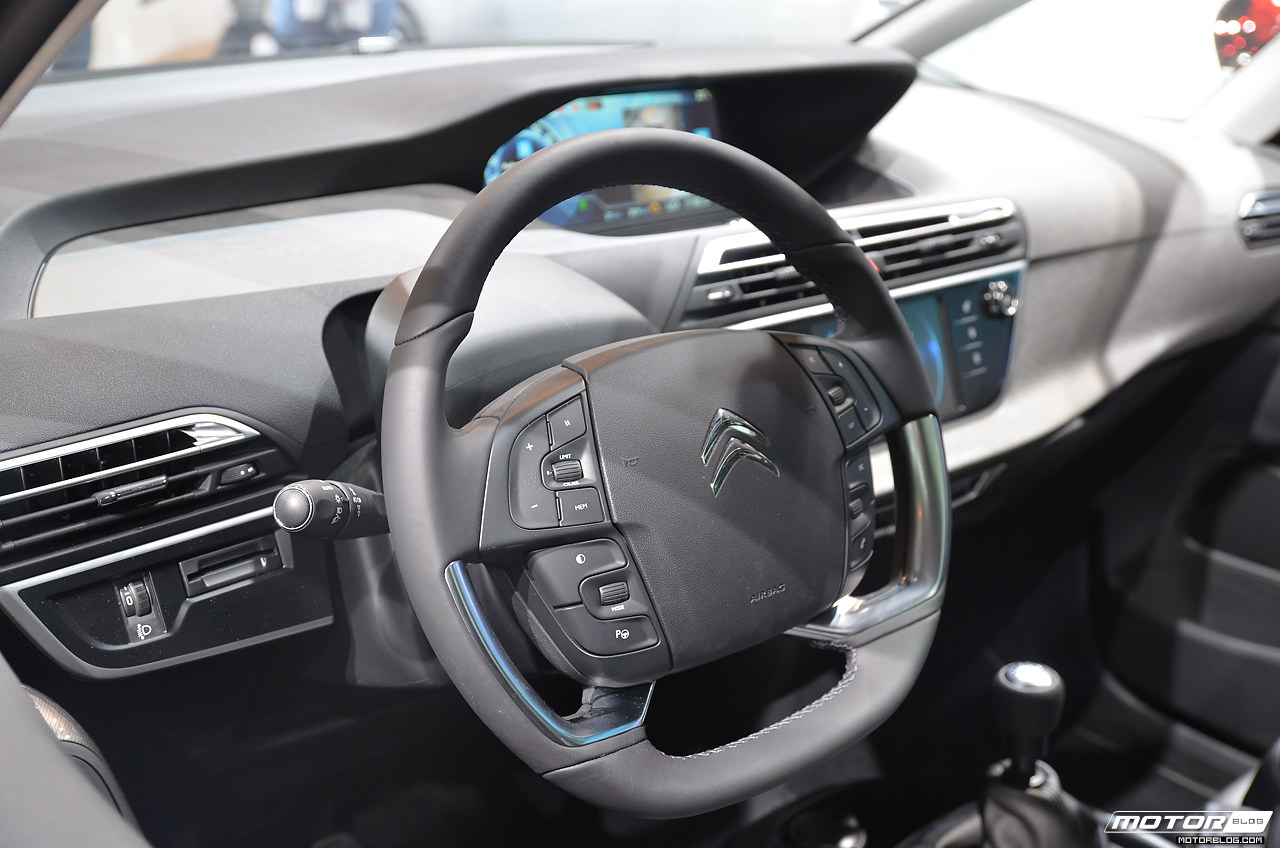
Interior (pre-facelift)

The second generation C4 Picasso was unveiled in March 2013, as the Citroën Technospace concept at the Geneva Motor Show.

The new C4 Picasso is built on the PSA EMP2 platform, which it shares with other PSA vehicles, including the second versions of the Peugeot 3008 and Peugeot 5008. Since the EMP2 platform is considerably lighter than the First generation's PF2, the C4 Picasso has a lower weight than the smaller Citroën C3 Picasso MPV.

The second generation of the C4 Picasso has a 537-litre boot capacity, increasing to 630 litres with the three rear seats downright. The passenger front seat also folds flat, enabling the vehicle to transport objects up to 2.5 metres in length.

In early 2018, the car was renamed from C4 Picasso to C4 SpaceTourer (and Grand C4 Picasso to Grand C4 SpaceTourer). At the same time the automatic transmission was changed to an 8-speed, replacing the older 6-speed.

The C4 SpaceTourer range was simplified in early 2019 due to the introduction of the C5 Aircross. The five-seat C4 SpaceTourer was discontinued in some export markets (as the UK in May 2019), but production was still running.

C4 SpaceTourer is out of production since mid-2020. 7 seat Grand C4 SpaceTourer is manufactured until July 2022.

=== Equipment ===
Depending on country, the available features and equipment vary accordingly, Daytime Running Lamps (DRLs) above the headlamps are standard in all EU markets. The vehicle also has a wide array of features including: Anti-lock Braking System (ABS), Electronic Brakeforce Distribution (EBD), Emergency Braking Assistance (EBA), Intelligent Traction Control (ITC), and Electronic Stability Control (ESC). Further, the vehicle also has an upgraded lane departure warning system (LDWS) over the previous generation, utilising digital imaging and line recognition to vibrate the front seatbelts in Exclusive+ models and warn of a lane change at low speed.

This gives the possibility to wake or alert a sleeping or distracted driver. The C4 Picasso gained a back-up rear view camera, and an optional 360 degree panoramic vision system which consists of four wide angle cameras fitted in the front, the rear door, and the side mirrors to eliminate blind spots and aid parking. A parking assistance system is also optional on the Picasso, which with the help of mounted ultrasonic sensors can determine a suitable parking space for a semi-automatic parking experience.

This same bumper mounted radar system is utilised for the Active Cruise Control (ACC) feature on the Exclusive+. The radar is able to detect the distance and speed of vehicles and slow the vehicle or brake if necessary to avoid a collision. The dashboard user interface was also upgraded, now featuring a twelve inch panoramic color display which allows for the display of navigation, and other road assistance tools, with a degree of customization.

The car also received a touch sensitive 7" tablet to control the navigation system, carkit, multimedia system and other infotainment features. The audio system features an 6 Arkamys speakers system powered by a dedicated custom designed amplifier, unlike most other Citroën cars that feature a Denon audio system.

Reviewers overall were impressed with the large five square metre space inside the vehicle, surrounded by large windows and thin door pillars. RACCars.co.uk were critical of the ETG6 gearbox, echoing previous criticisms from other reviewers, but praised the new platform for absorbing road imperfections easily and improving the driving experience.

=== Safety ===
ANCAP test results* Citroen C4 Grand Picasso all variants (2014)
| Test | Score |
|---|---|
| Overall | 5 /5 stars |
| Frontal offset | 13.53/16 |
| Side impact | 16/16 |
| Pole | 2/2 |
| Seat belt reminders | 3/3 |
| Whiplash protection | Good |
| Pedestrian protection | Adequate |
| Electronic stability control | Standard |

Euro NCAP test results* Second generation (LHD) (2013)
| Test | Points | % |
|---|---|---|
| Overall: | 5 /5 stars | |
| Adult occupant: | 31 | 86% |
| Child occupant: | 44 | 88% |
| Pedestrian: | 25 | 68% |
| Safety assist: | 7 | 81% |

The second generation C4 Picasso has six airbags by default, with adjustable pressures; two airbags for the front, two lateral for the passengers, and two side curtain airbags to prevent head injuries.

=== Transmissions ===
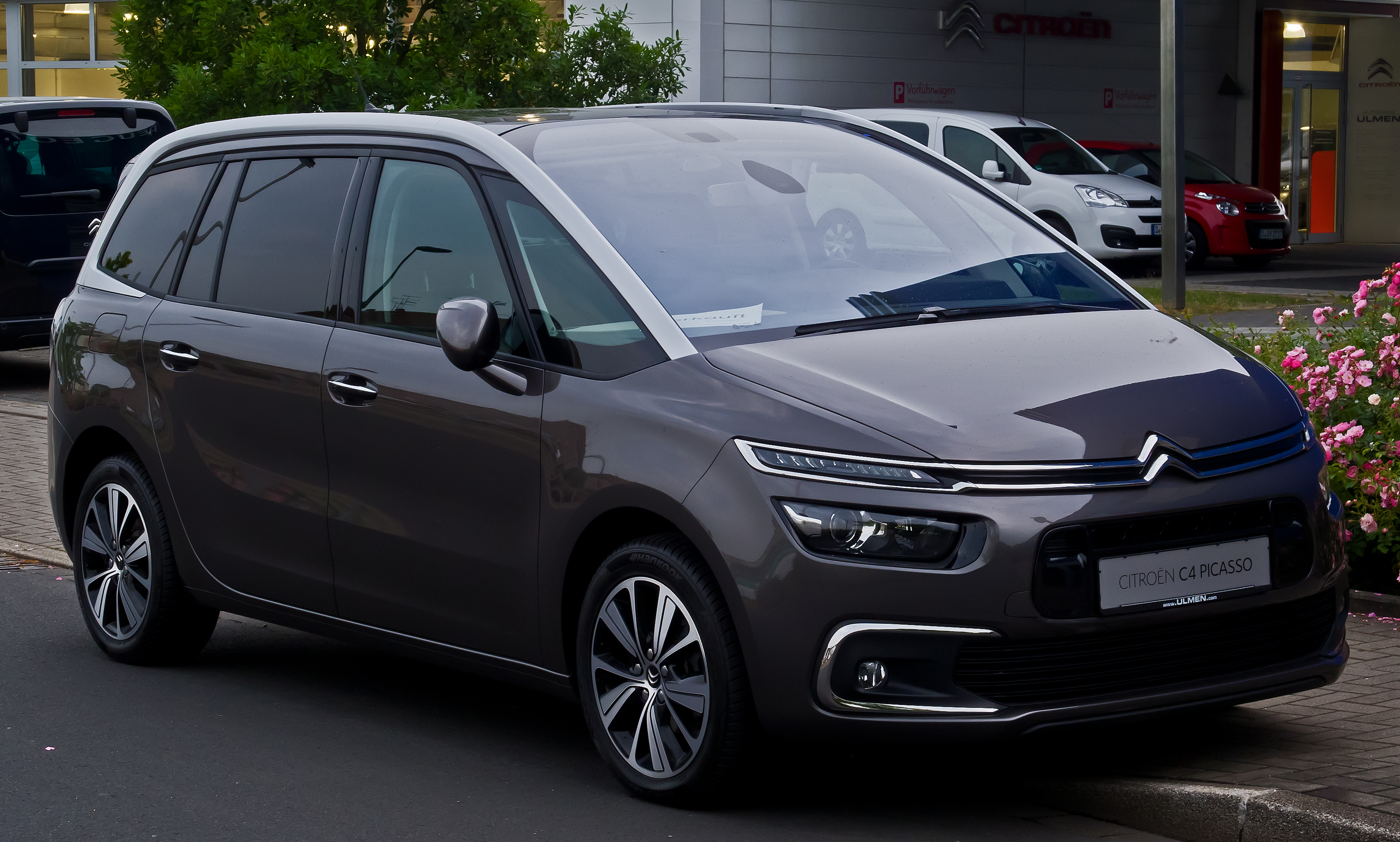
Citroën Grand C4 Picasso (facelift)

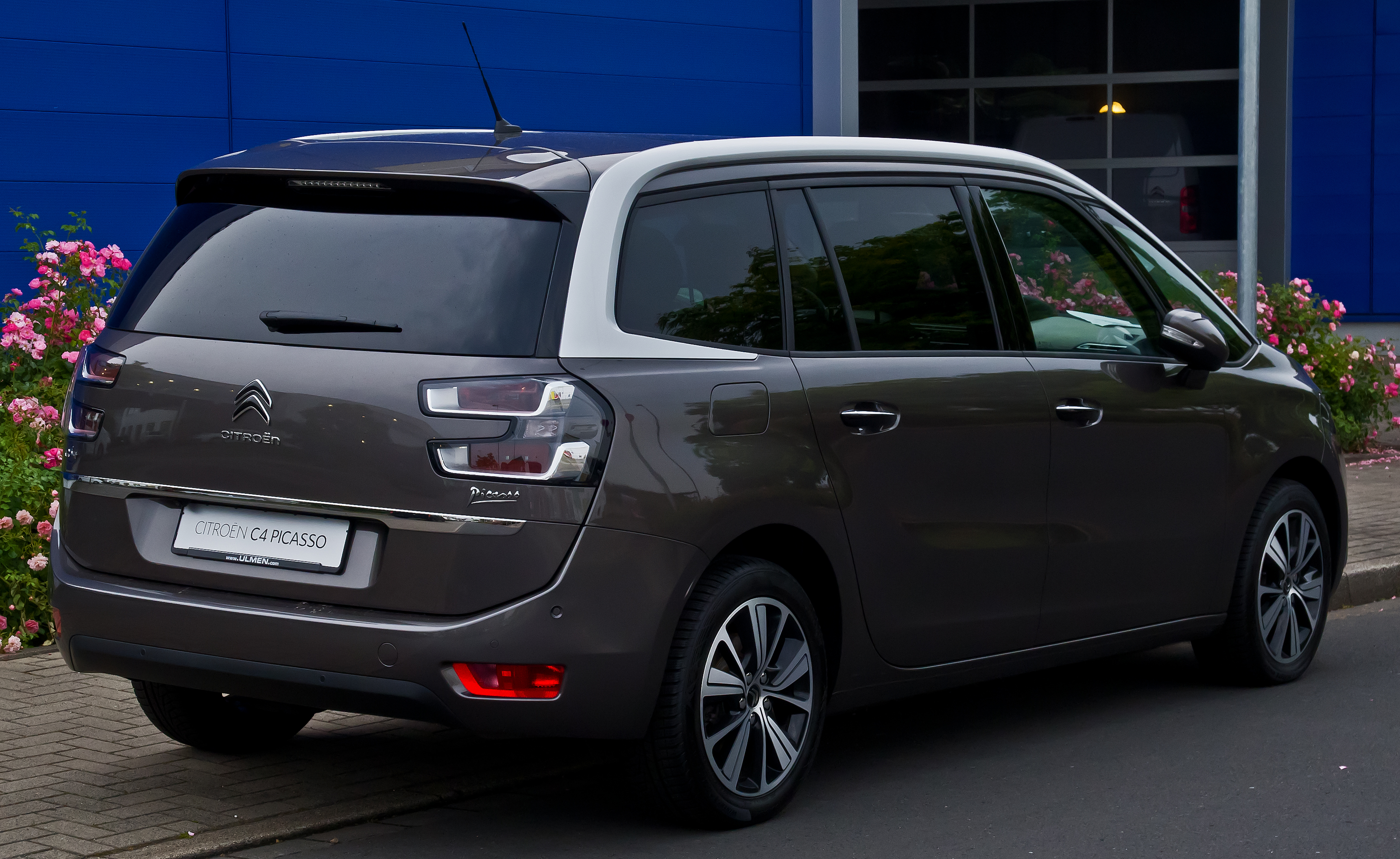
Citroën Grand C4 Picasso (facelift)

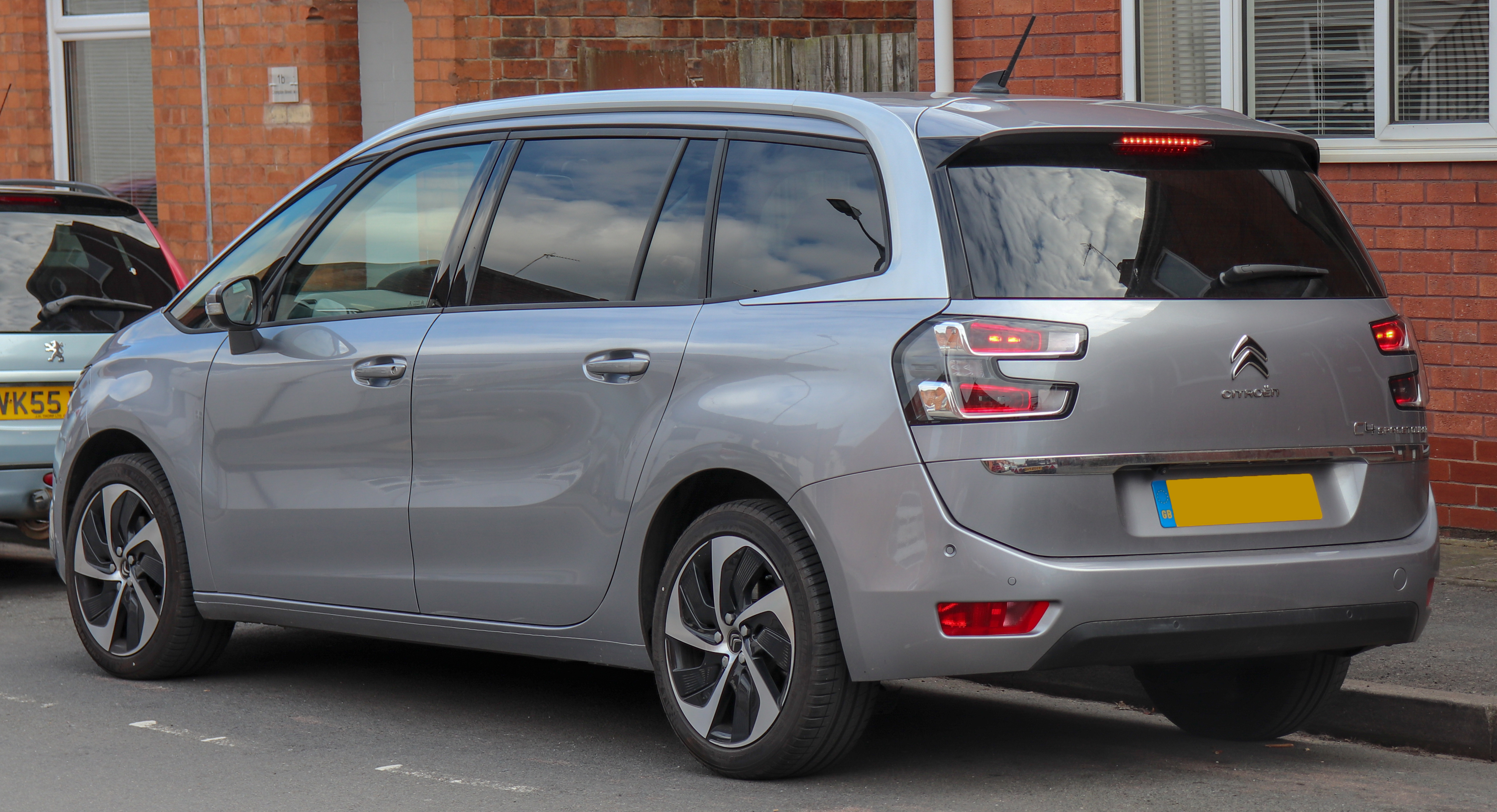
Citroën Grand C4 Spacetourer (facelift)

Initially, the C4 Picasso models featured Citroën's new six speed automated manual gearbox, called "Efficient Tronic Gearbox six speed" (ETG6). It allows the driver to switch, at any time, between manual and automatic modes. Some reviews have been critical of the ETG6 gearbox: Auto Trader's review called it "jerky" and slow to react to a gear change, while Citroën Owners Club called it "poor".

From 2015, with the introduction of the BlueHDi engine range, Citroën replaced the ETG6 transmission with an Aisin sourced six speed torque converter automatic transmission, known as EAT6.

The four speed automatic, six speed ETG and six-speed automatic transmissions have two shifting options chosen by a column mounted mode selector: either the paddle shifted manual mode or the fully automated/automatic mode with manual override with Formula One styled paddles. The ETG/automatic gearbox also brings with it an optional air conditioned storage compartment (fridge) including can holders, between the driver's and the front passenger's seat, where the manual transmission lever would usually be.

Earlier 1.6-litre diesel engines and post-2015 petrol engines featured a start-stop system based on the Valeo i-StARS reversible starter/alternator, and termed e-HDi for diesel models and e-THP for petrol models. Two "ultracapacitors" are charged during braking, and the energy stored in them is used to turn the i StARS when engine restart is required.

According to PSA, the system is able to restart the engine in as little as 400ms, and while the vehicle is still moving at between 8–20 km/h, which a conventional starter is unable to do. The i-StARS is rated for up to 600,000 restart cycles, and PSA claims up to 15% fuel savings. Modifications to prevent engine wear during the shut off phase and from constant restarts include an improved turbocharger lubrication system as well as reinforcements to the injection pump, crankshaft bearings, and dual-mass flywheel.

== Engines ==
Engine range and spec
| Model | Years | Engine code | Displacement (cc, cu in) | Power | Torque | 0–100 km/h (0–62 mph) (seconds) | Top speed | Transmission | CO_{2} emissions (g/km) |
Petrol engines
| 1.6 litre VTi 16v | 2006–present | EP6 | 1,598 (98) | 89 kW; 122 PS (120 bhp) | 160 N⋅m (118 lb⋅ft) | 12.1 | 187 km/h (116 mph) | five speed manual | 145 |
| 1.6 litre THP 16v | 2006–2013 | EP6DT | 1,598 (98) | 104 kW; 142 PS (140 bhp) | 244 N⋅m (180 lb⋅ft) | 11.5 | 192 km/h (119 mph) | four speed automatic | 197 |
| 1.6 litre THP 16v | 2006–2013 | EP6DT | 1,598 (98) | 112 kW; 152 PS (150 bhp) | 240 N⋅m (177 lb⋅ft) | 10 | 204 km/h (127 mph) | six speed automatic (ETG6) | 173 |
| 1.6 litre THP 16v | 2013–2015 | EP6CDT | 1,598 (98) | 116 kW; 157 PS (155 bhp) | 240 N⋅m (177 lb⋅ft) | 9 | 210 km/h (130 mph) | six speed manual | 139 |
| 1.6 litre THP 16v | 2006–2013 | EP6CDT | 1,598 (98) | 116 kW; 157 PS (155 bhp) | 240 N⋅m (177 lb⋅ft) | 9 | 210 km/h (130 mph) | six speed automatic (EAT6) | 155 |
| 1.8 litre injection 16v | 2006–2013 | EW7A | 1,749 (107) | 95 kW; 129 PS (127 bhp) | 170 N⋅m (125 lb⋅ft) | 11.9 | 185 km/h (115 mph) | five speed manual | 190 |
| 2.0 litre injection 16v | 2006–2013 | EW10A | 1,997 (122) | 107 kW; 145 PS (143 bhp) | 199 N⋅m (147 lb⋅ft) | 11.5 | 195 km/h (121 mph) | six speed automatic (ETG6) | 190 |
| 2.0 litre injection 16v | 2006–2013 | EW10A | 1,997 (122) | 107 kW; 145 PS (143 bhp) | 199 N⋅m (147 lb⋅ft) | 12 | 190 km/h (118 mph) | fourspeed automatic | 211 |
| 1.2 litre PureTech | 2015– | EB2DTS | 1,199 (73) | 96 kW; 131 PS (129 bhp) | 230 N⋅m (170 lb⋅ft) | 10.1 (10.8) | 201 km/h (125 mph) | six speed manual | 115 |
| 1.6 litre THP | 2015– | EP6FDT | 1,598 (98) | 122 kW; 165 PS (163 bhp) | 240 N⋅m (177 lb⋅ft) | 8.4 (8.7) | 210 km/h (130 mph) | six speed automatic (EAT6) | 130 |
Diesel engines
| 1.6 litre HDi 8v | 2013–2015 | DV6 | 1,560 (95) | 67 kW; 91 PS (90 bhp) | 230 N⋅m (170 lb⋅ft) | 12.9 | 174 km/h (108 mph) | five speed manual | 109 |
| 1.6 litre HDi 16v | 2006–2013 | DV6TED4 | 1,560 (95) | 82 kW; 112 PS (110 bhp) | 240 N⋅m (177 lb⋅ft) | 12.5 | 180 km/h (112 mph) | five speed manual | 140 |
| 1.6 litre HDi 16v | 2006–2013 | DV6TED4 | 1,560 (95) | 82 kW; 112 PS (110 bhp) | 240 N⋅m (177 lb⋅ft) | 13.2 | 180 km/h (112 mph) | six speed Automatic (ETG6) | 135 |
| 1.6 litre HDi 16v | 2006–2013 | DV6TED4 | 1,560 (95) | 82 kW; 112 PS (110 bhp) | 285 N⋅m (210 lb⋅ft) | 13.1 | 180 km/h (112 mph) | six speed manual | 132 |
| 1.6 litre HDi 16v | 2006–2013 | DV6TED4 | 1,560 (95) | 82 kW; 112 PS (110 bhp) | 285 N⋅m (210 lb⋅ft) | 13.3 | 182 km/h (113 mph) | six speed automatic (ETG6) | 132 |
| 2.0 litre HDi 16v | 2006–2013 | DW10BTED4 | 1,997 (122) | 103 kW; 140 PS (138 bhp) | 270 N⋅m (199 lb⋅ft) | 12.4 | 195 km/h (121 mph) | six speed automatic (ETG6) | 153 |
| 2.0 litre HDi 16v | 2006–2013 | DW10BTED4 | 1,997 (122) | 103 kW; 140 PS (138 bhp) | 270 N⋅m (199 lb⋅ft) | 12.1 | 190 km/h (118 mph) | six speed automatic (ETG6) | 195 |
| 2.0 litre HDi 16v | 2006–2013 | DW10BTED4 | 1,997 (122) | 103 kW; 140 PS (138 bhp) | 320 N⋅m (236 lb⋅ft) | 12.1 | 190 km/h (118 mph) | six speed automatic (ETG6) | 195 |
| 2.0 litre HDi 16v | 2006–2013 | DW10BTED4 | 1,997 (122) | 112 kW; 152 PS (150 bhp) | 300 N⋅m (221 lb⋅ft) | 10.6 | 190 km/h (118 mph) | six speed automatic (ETG6) | 137 |
| 2.0 litre HDi 16v | 2006–2013 | DW10CTED4 | 1,997 (122) | 119 kW; 162 PS (160 bhp) | 340 N⋅m (251 lb⋅ft) | 10.7 | 190 km/h (118 mph) | six speed automatic (ETG6) | 177 |
| 2.0 litre HDi 16v | 2006–2013 | DW10D | 1,997 (122) | 112 kW; 152 PS (150 bhp) | 340 N⋅m (251 lb⋅ft) | 10.2 | 195 km/h (121 mph) | six speed manual | 140 |
| 1.6 litre e-HDi Airdream 8v | 2013–2015 | DV6C | 1,560 (95) | 67 kW; 91 PS (90 bhp) | 230 N⋅m (170 lb⋅ft) | 13.7 | 175 km/h (109 mph) | six speed Automatic (ETG6) | 98 |
| 1.6 litre e-HDi Airdream 8v | 2013–2015 | DV6C | 1,560 (95) | 86 kW; 117 PS (115 bhp) | 270 N⋅m (199 lb⋅ft) | 12.3 | 188 km/h (117 mph) | six speed Automatic (ETG6) | 104 |
| 1.6 litre e-HDi Airdream 8v | 2013–2015 | DV6C | 1,560 (95) | 86 kW; 117 PS (115 bhp) | 270 N⋅m (199 lb⋅ft) | 11.8 | 188 km/h (117 mph) | six speed manual | 105 |
| 1.6 litre e-HDi Airdream 16v | 2006–2013 | DV6C | 1,560 (95) | 82 kW; 112 PS (110 bhp) | 285 N⋅m (210 lb⋅ft) | 13.3 | 182 km/h (113 mph) | six speed Automatic (ETG6) | 120 |
| 1.6 litre BlueHDi | 2015– | DV6FC | 1,560 (95) | 74 kW; 100 PS (99 bhp) | 254 N⋅m (187 lb⋅ft) | 12.7 (13.1) | 175 km/h (109 mph) | five speed manual | 99 |
| 1.6 litre BlueHDi | 2015– | DV6FC | 1,560 (95) | 88 kW; 120 PS (118 bhp) | 300 N⋅m (221 lb⋅ft) | 11.3 (11.6) | 188 km/h (117 mph) | six speed manual | 100 (105) |
| 1.6 litre BlueHDi | 2015– | DV6FC | 1,560 (95) | 88 kW; 120 PS (118 bhp) | 300 N⋅m (221 lb⋅ft) | 11.2 (11.5) | 188 km/h (117 mph) | six speed automatic (EAT6) | 100 (103) |
| 2.0 litre BlueHDi | 2013- | DW10FC BlueHDI | 1,997 (122) | 110 kW; 150 PS (148 bhp) | 370 N⋅m (273 lb⋅ft) | 9.7 (9.8) | 210 km/h (130 mph) | six speed manual | 102 |
| 2.0 litre BlueHDi | 2013- | DW10FC BlueHDI | 1,997 (122) | 110 kW; 150 PS (148 bhp) | 370 N⋅m (273 lb⋅ft) | 10.1 (10.2) | 208 km/h (129 mph) | six speed automatic (EAT6) | 112 |

== Sales ==
| Year | Worldwide production | Worldwide sales | Notes |
|---|---|---|---|
| 2009 | 133,800 | 143,800 | |
| 2010 | 126,800 | 128,800 | |
| 2011 | TBA | 116,927 | |
| 2012 | 80,600 | 82,900 | |
| 2013 | 104,700 | 99,900 | |
| 2014 | N/A | 124,100 | |

891,000 first generation and 732,000 second generation C4 Picasso (including C4 SpaceTourer) have been produced.

== See also ==
- List of Citroën vehicles
