= Citroën Xsara Picasso =

Five door compact MPV

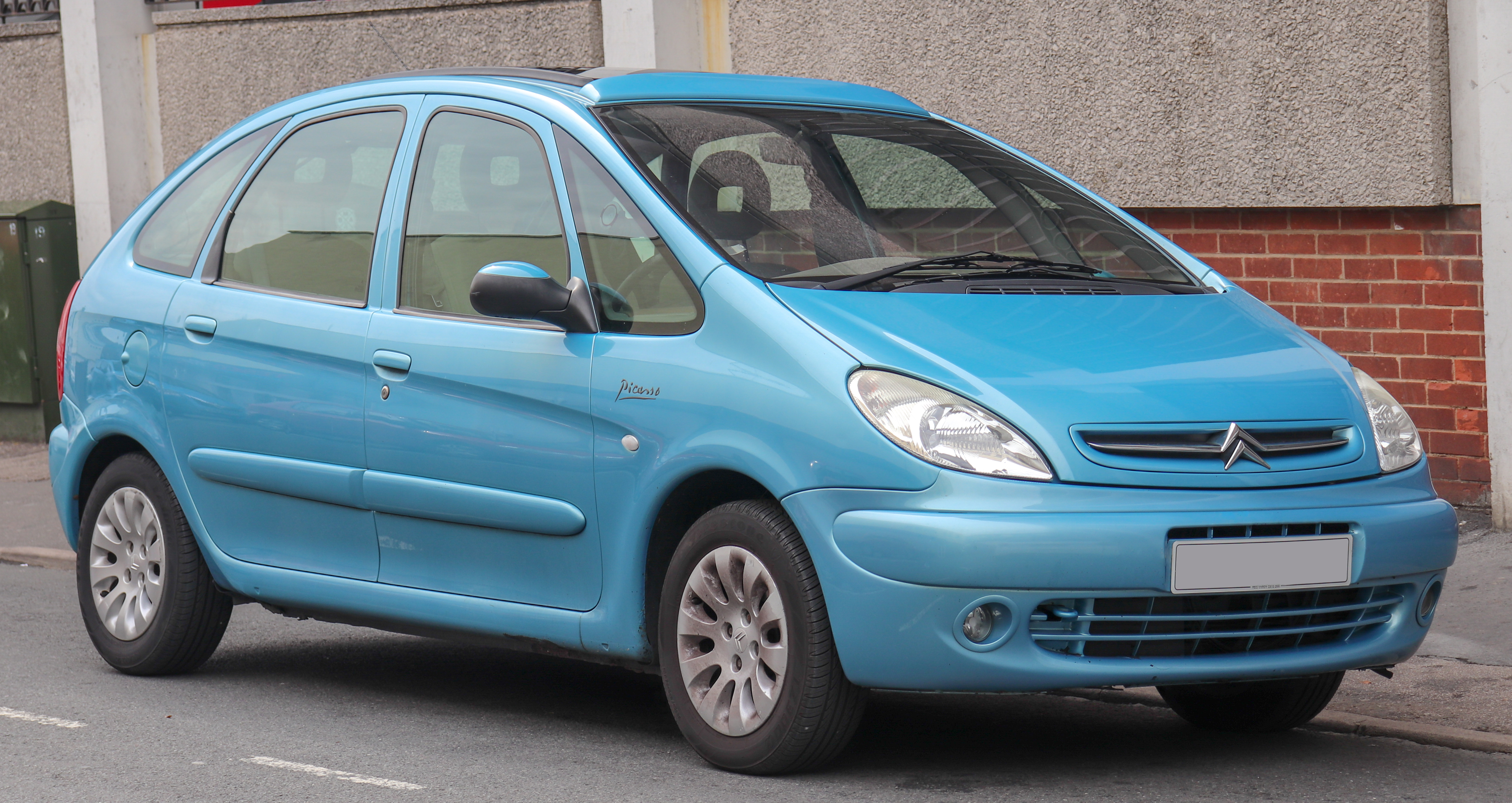

Overview
- Manufacturer: Citroën
- Production: 1999–2010 (Spain); 2001–2012 (Brazil); 2007–2009 (France); 2001–2009 (China)
- Assembly: Vigo, Spain (PSA Vigo Plant); Cairo, Egypt (AAV); Porto Real, Brazil (Citroën Brazil); Wuhan, China (DPCA); Rennes, France (PSA Rennes Plant)
- Designer: Donato Coco

Body and chassis
- Class: B-segment MPV (M)
- Body style: 5-door MPV
- Layout: Front-engine, front-wheel-drive
- Related: Citroën Xsara; Citroën C3 Picasso; Citroën C4 Picasso

Dimensions
- Wheelbase: 2,760 mm (108.7 in)
- Length: 4,280 mm (168.5 in)
- Width: 1,750 mm (68.9 in)
- Height: 1,640 mm (64.6 in)
- Curb weight: 1,300 kg (2,866.0 lb)

Chronology
- Successor: Citroën C3 Picasso; Citroën C4 Picasso

The Citroën Xsara Picasso is a five-seater, five-door compact MPV produced by Citroën from 1999 to 2012. It was based on the Xsara hatchback platform.

== Trim range ==
At the time of its release in December 1999 (June 2000 in the UK), two trim levels were available, LX and SX. Later designations were 'Desire', 'VTX', and the range topping 'Exclusive' trim level, some with an electric glass sunroof. On all models, the front seat backs have fold down tables, and the rear seats can be removed to create extensive internal space for transportation of bulky items similar to a small van.

=== 2004 facelift ===
The model received a facelift in early 2004 with updated bumpers and engines, while body-coloured bumpers were made standard on all trim levels.

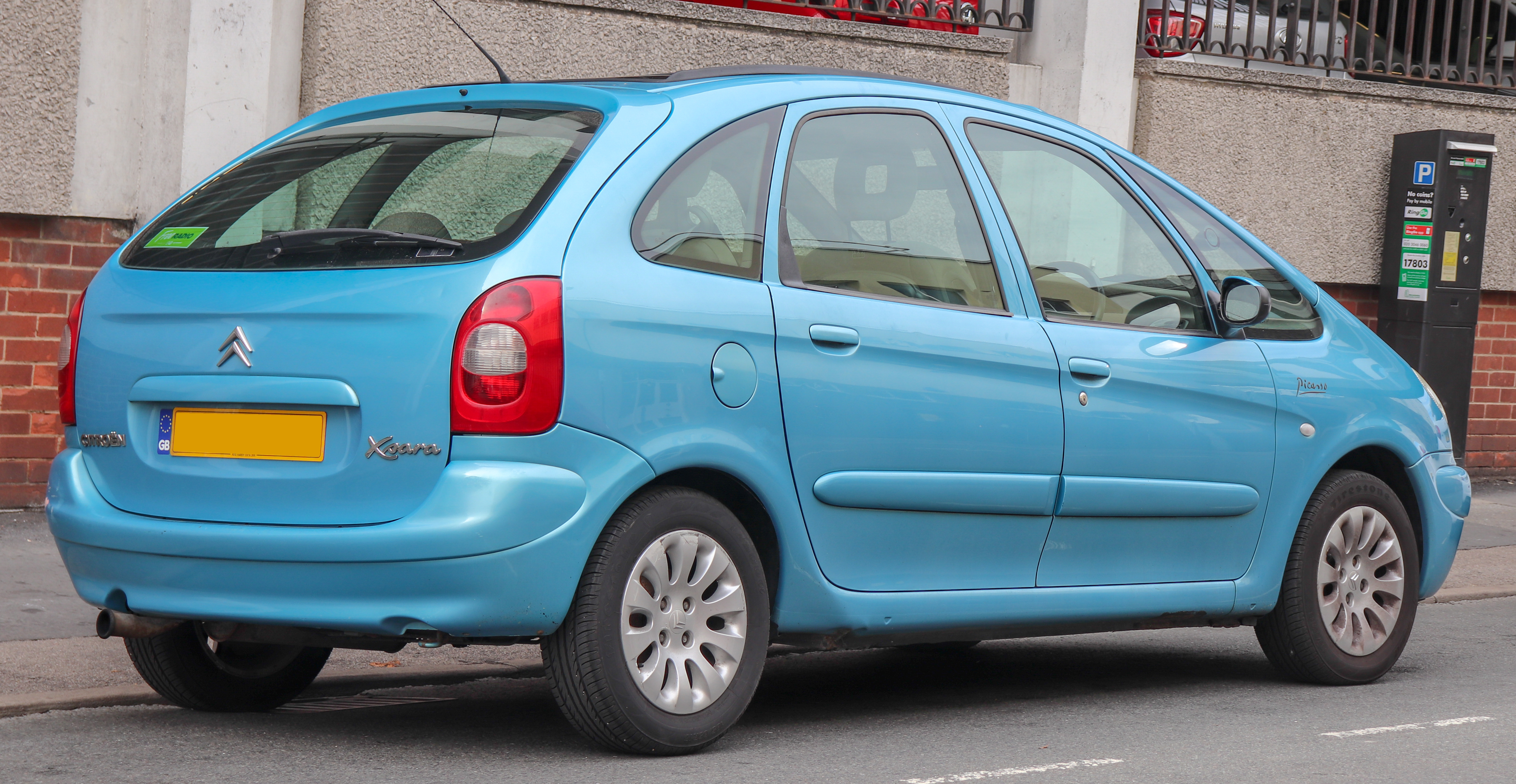
Rear view

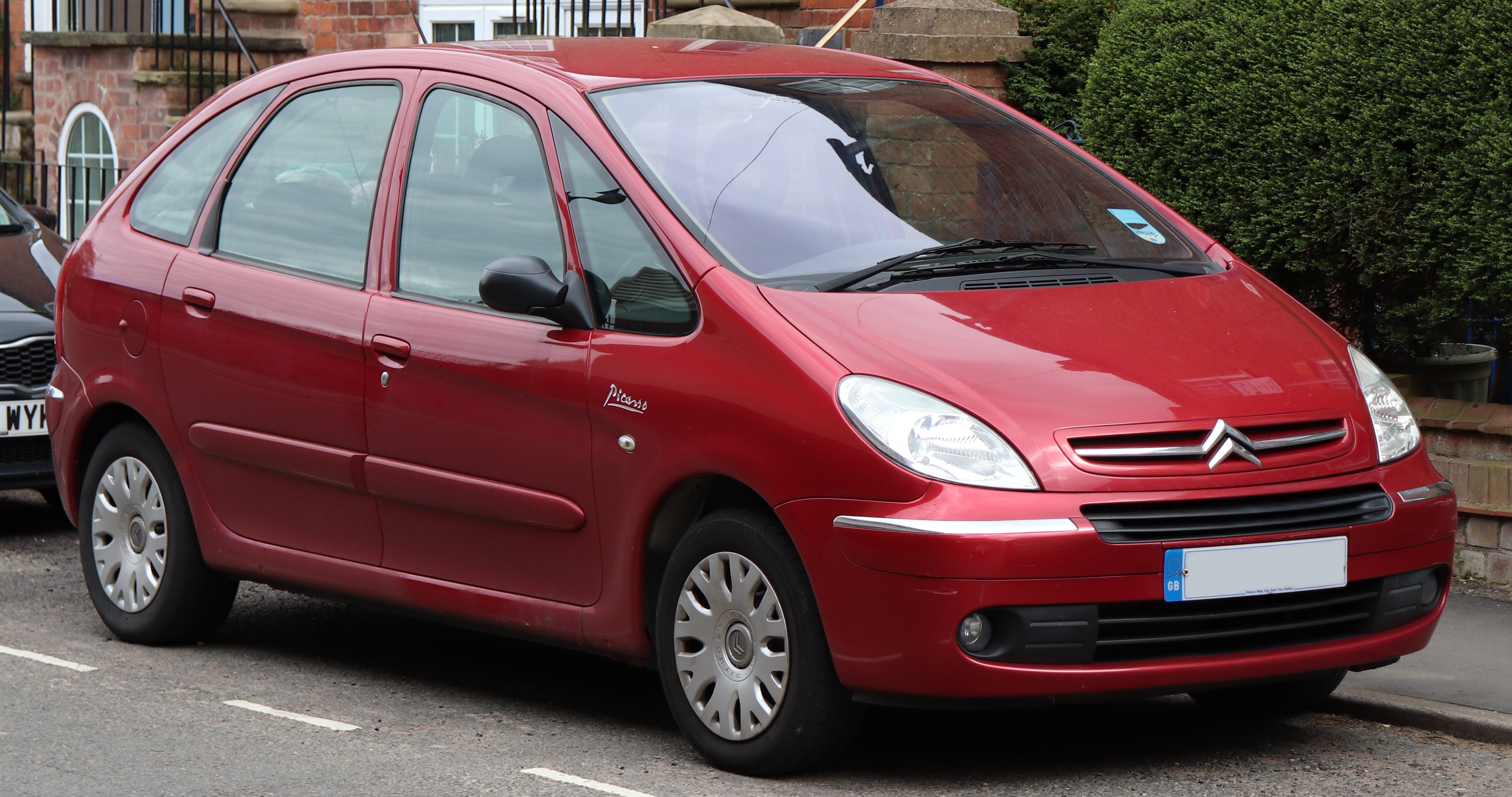
Facelift

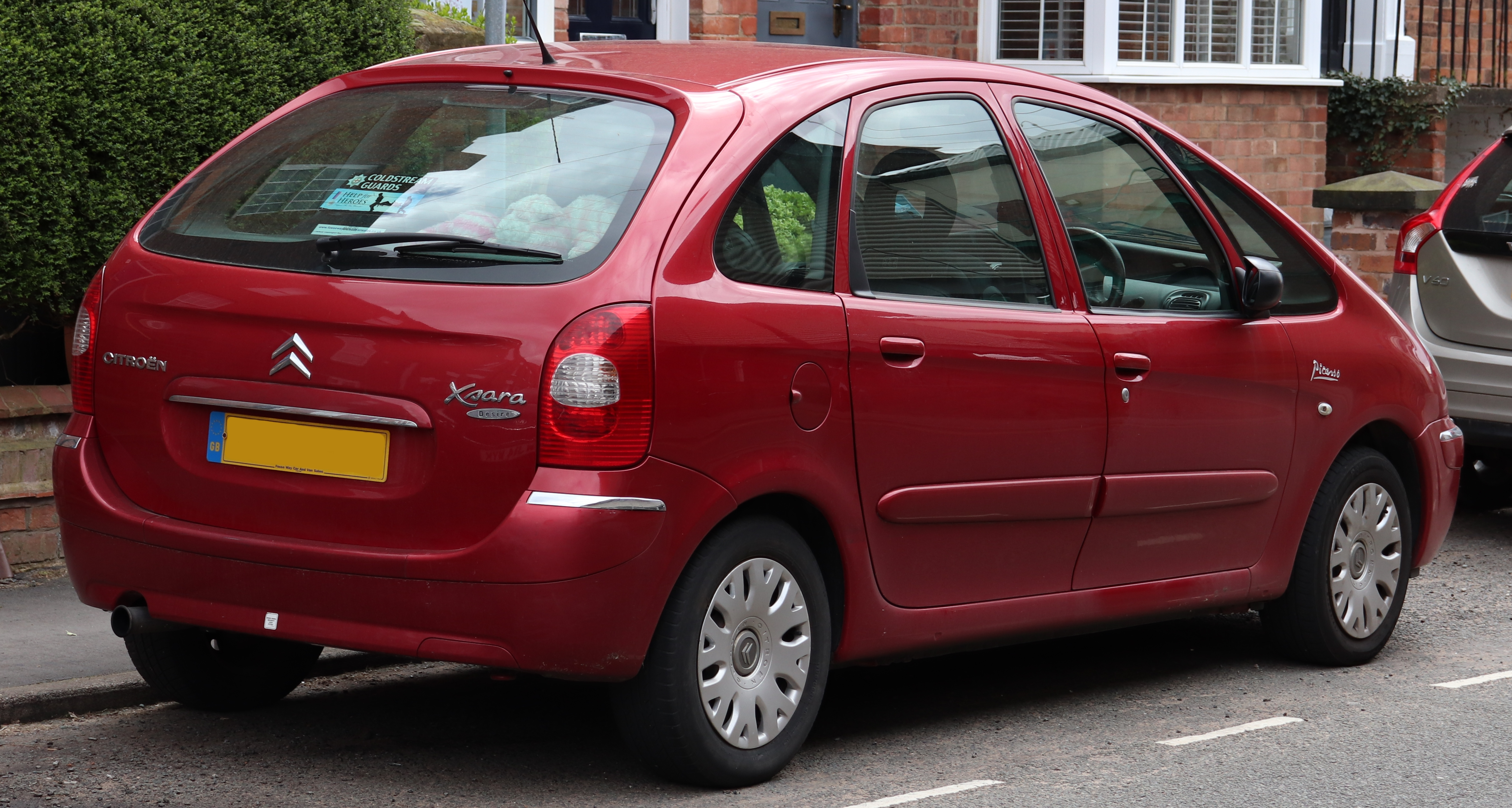
Rear view (facelift)

== Engines ==
The Xsara Picasso was available with a 1.6, 1.8 and 2.0 litre (automatic only) petrol engines, or a choice of 1.6 and 2.0-litre (replaced by the 1.6-litre 2004 onwards) diesels, all shared with the smaller Citroën Xsara apart from the 1.6 diesel.

Petrol engine
Model	Engine	Displacement	Power	Torque	0–100 km/h (0–62 mph)	Top speed	CO_{2} emission (g/km)
1.6i	I4	1587 cc	65 kW (87 hp) at 5,600 rpm	135 N⋅m (100 lbf⋅ft) at 3,000 rpm	15.0 s	110 mph (170 km/h)	187
1.6i	I4	1587 cc	69 kW (93 hp) at 5,700 rpm	135 N⋅m (100 lbf⋅ft) at 3,000 rpm	15.0 s	106 mph (171 km/h)	178
1.6i	I4	1587 cc	80 kW (110 hp) at 6,000 rpm	147 N⋅m (108 lbf⋅ft) at 4,000 rpm	15.0 s	110 mph (180 km/h)	172
1.8i	I4	1749 cc	85 kW (114 hp) at 5,500 rpm	160 N⋅m (120 lbf⋅ft) at 4,000 rpm	12.2 s	120 mph (190 km/h)	187
2.0i	I4	1997 cc	100 kW (130 hp) at 6,000 rpm	190 N⋅m (140 lbf⋅ft) at 4,100 rpm	10.9 s	119 mph (192 km/h)	207

Diesel engine
Model	Engine	Displacement	Power	Torque	0–100 km/h (0–62 mph)	Top speed	CO_{2} emission (g/km)
1.6 HDi	I4	1560 cc	66 kW (89 hp) at 4,000 rpm	205 N⋅m (151 lbf⋅ft) at 1,750 rpm	13.8 s	104 mph (168 km/h)	N/A
1.6 HDiF	I4	1560 cc	66 kW (89 hp) at 4,000 rpm	205 N⋅m (151 lbf⋅ft) at 1,750 rpm	11.9 s	104 mph (168 km/h)	136
1.6 HDi	I4	1560 cc	80 kW (110 hp) at 4,000 rpm	240 N⋅m (180 lbf⋅ft) at 1,750 rpm	11.9 s	114 mph (183 km/h)	131
1.6 HDiF	I4	1560 cc	80 kW (110 hp) at 4,000 rpm	240 N⋅m (180 lbf⋅ft) at 1,750 rpm	11.9 s	114 mph (183 km/h)	136
2.0 HDi	I4	1997 cc	66 kW (89 hp) at 4,000 rpm	205 N⋅m (151 lbf⋅ft) at 1,900 rpm	14.5 s	109 mph (175 km/h)	147

== Sales and production ==
On 22 March 2007, Auto Trader reviewed the Xsara Picasso, calling it the most popular MPV in the United Kingdom, "thanks to a combination of practicality and affordability". From 1999 to 2010, the Xsara Picasso has been assembled at PSA plant in Vigo, Spain.

== South America ==
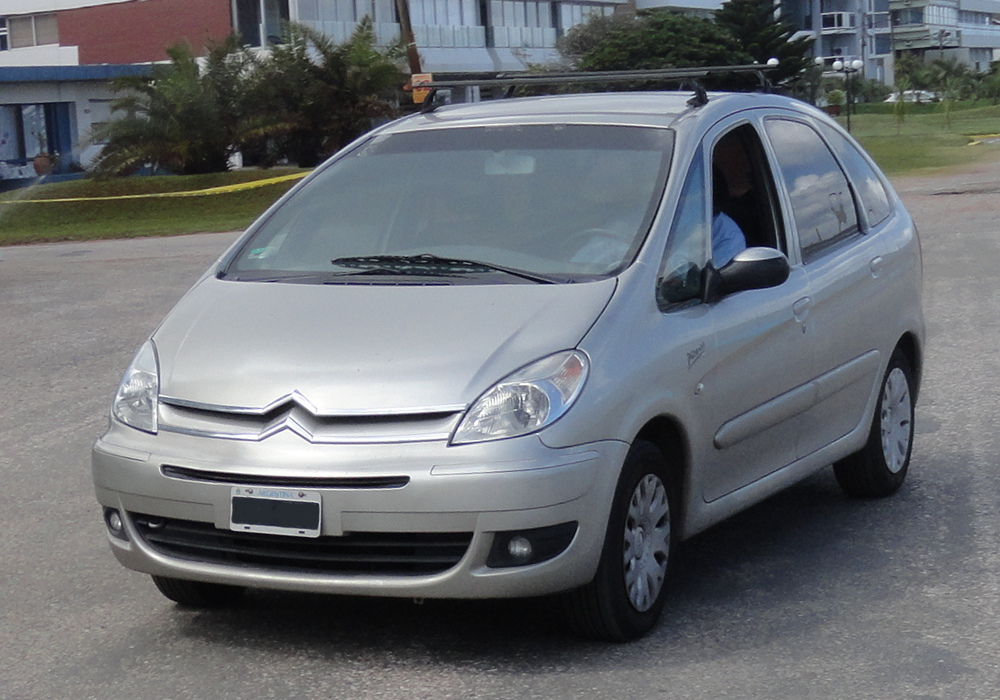
2007 Citroën Xsara Picasso for Latin America

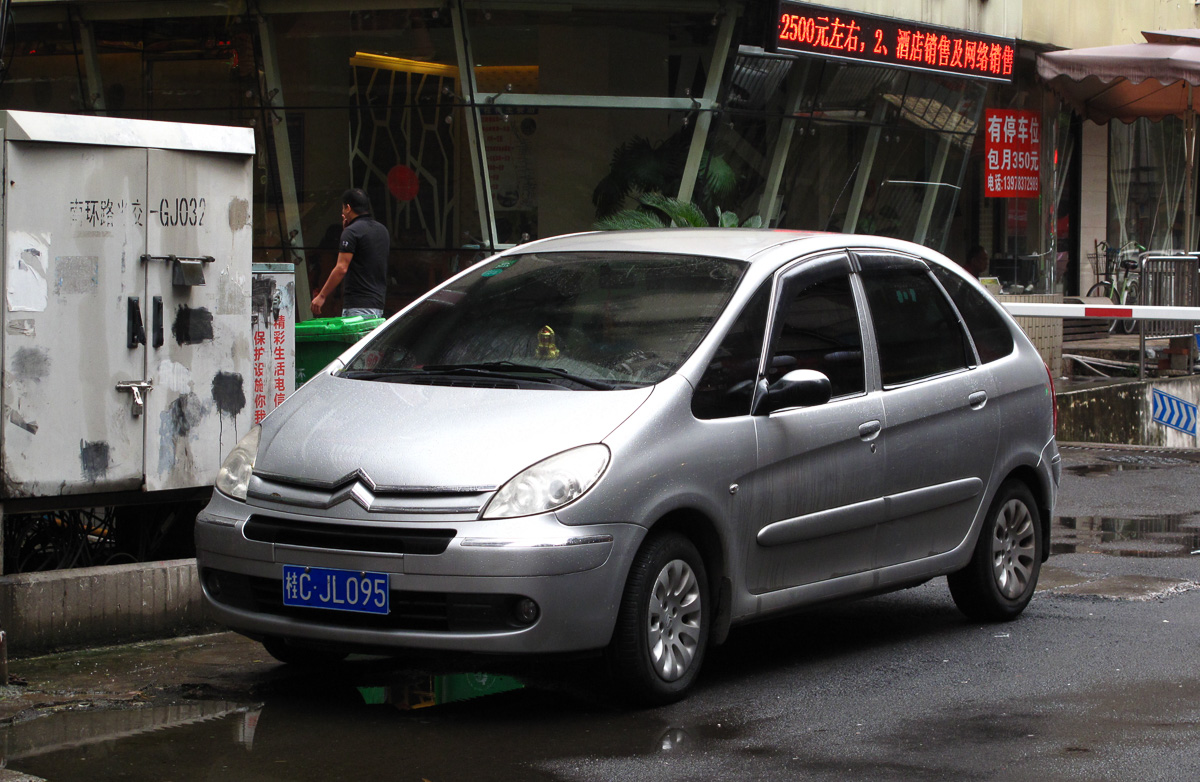
Citroën Xsara Picasso for China

Since 2001, the Xsara Picasso was produced in Porto Real, Brazil for the market in Latin America, where it was the top selling vehicle in its class for a while.

In December 2002, Citroën do Brasil launched a limited edition called Xsara Picasso Etoile, celebrating the victory of Lula from the PT at the 2002 Brazilian presidential election.

The model was restyled again in 2007 in China and South America, with the grille adopting wide chrome bars.

== Name ==
The Picasso name was licensed from the family of Pablo Picasso, which created significant international publicity at the time of the car's launch, as not all the Picasso family were happy with the association of the artist's name with a car, when his granddaughter Marina attempted to sue her uncle Claude in April 1999.

Pablo Picasso was originally associated with Citroën in the 1960s when he painted a Citroën DS with "The wreaths of Peace".
