= Citroën C3 Picasso =

Mini multi-purpose vehicle

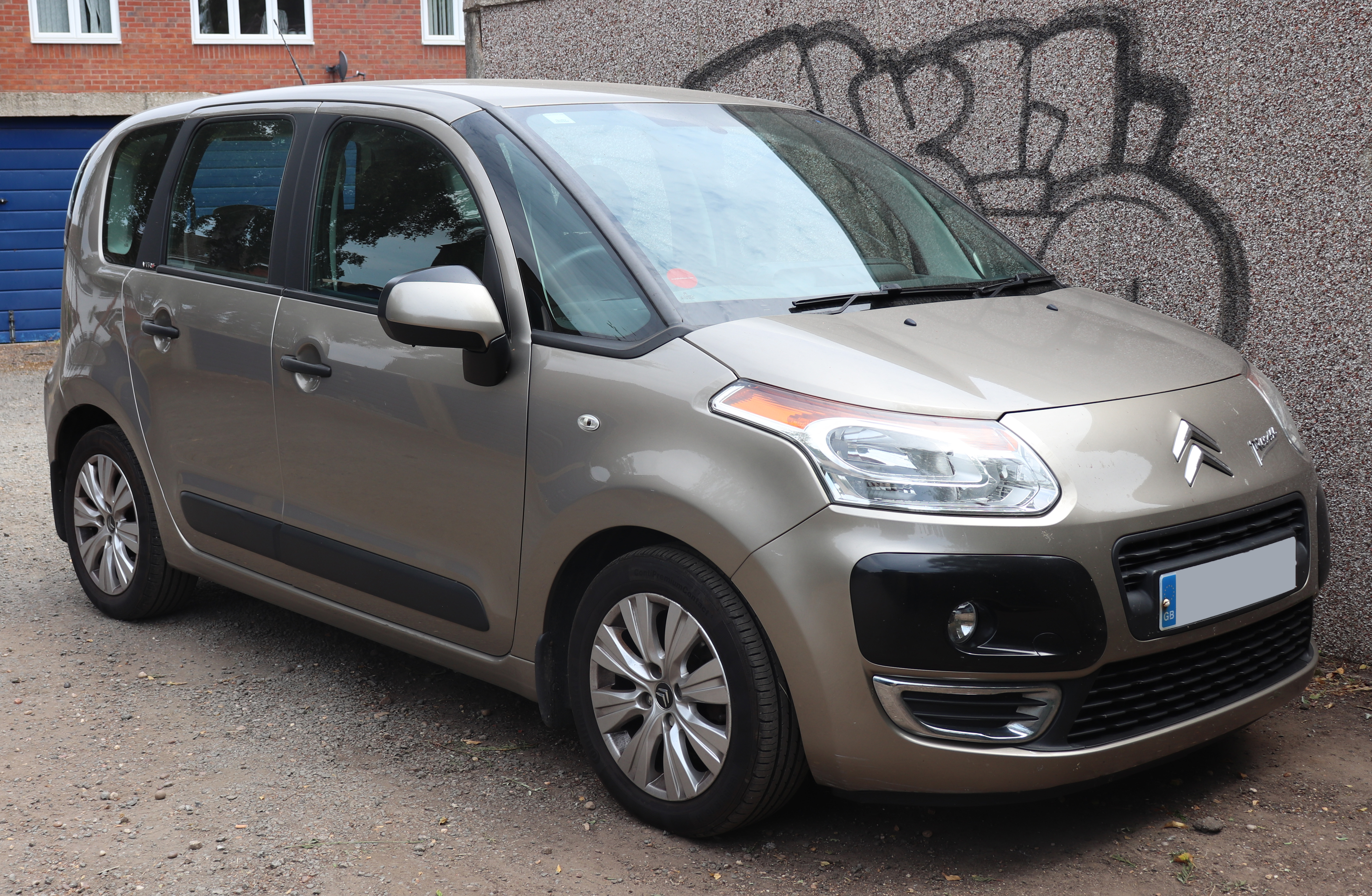

Overview
- Manufacturer: Citroën
- Production: 2008–2017
- Model years: 2009–2017
- Assembly: Slovakia: Trnava (Trnava Plant); Spain: Zaragoza (General Motors); Brazil: Porto Real (Citroën Brazil)
- Designer: Frédéric Duvernier (exterior); Miles Nurnberger (exterior); Andreas Stump (interior); Pascal Grappey (interior)

Body and chassis
- Class: Mini MPV (M)
- Body style: 5-door hatchback
- Layout: Front-engine, front-wheel-drive
- Platform: PSA PF1 platform
- Related: Peugeot 207 SW; Citroën C3; Citroën C3 Aircross

Powertrain
- Engine: Petrol: 1.4 L I4 16-valve; 1.6 L I4 16-valve; Diesel: 1.6 L I4 8-valve; 1.6 L I4 16-valve
- Transmission: 5-speed manual 6-speed manual 6-speed automatic (EGS6)

Suspension
- Front: Pseudo MacPherson strut
- Rear: Deformable torsion beam

Dimensions
- Wheelbase: 2,540 mm (100.0 in)
- Length: 4,078 mm (160.6 in)
- Width: 1,730–1,766 mm (68.1–69.5 in)
- Height: 1,624–1,669 mm (63.9–65.7 in)
- Kerb weight: 1,176–1,408 kg (2,593–3,104 lb)

Chronology
- Predecessor: Citroën Xsara Picasso
- Successor: Citroën C3 Aircross (2017)

The Citroën C3 Picasso is a car produced by the French motor company Citroën from 2008 to 2017. It has a five-door mini MPV design and was first unveiled at the 2008 Paris Motor Show as a concept car named "Drooneel". The Picasso is the mini MPV version of the Citroën C3 and the successor of the Citroën Xsara Picasso, and was designed to compete with the Opel Meriva, Nissan Note, Renault Modus and Ford Fusion.

The C3 Picasso was first assembled in December 2007 at the PSA Trnava Plant in Slovakia, which Citroën announced from France in July 2008 would be the sole manufacturing site of the model. Citroën presented the finished product to the Slovak press and public on 25 September before it was unveiled to the world in October at the 2008 Paris Motor Show. The Trnava Plant by then was expected to be building 28 cars per hour as the C3 Picasso went on sale in France in February 2009 for €14,950. The company began to sell the car in other European markets in March 2009.

A SUV-styled derivative named Citroën C3 Aircross (then Citroën Aircross) was manufactured in Brazil and sold in Latin America from 2010 to 2020. This model gave birth to a more urban-styled vehicle called C3 Picasso (manufactured in Brazil from 2011 to 2015), which was closer to the Brazilian C3 Aircross than to the global C3 Picasso. Both C3 Aircross and the Brazilian C3 Picasso were based on the Brazilian first generation Citroën C3, when the global C3 Picasso was based on the global Peugeot 207 SW.

When launched in Spain in 2009, only three trims were available: LX, SX, or Exclusive. The LX was the most basic and least expensive model, with a 71 kW; 96 PS (95 bhp) VTi engine, priced at €12,590, while the Exclusive model was most expensive with an 82 kW; 110 PS (110 bhp) HDi Airdream engine at €18,650. The C3 Picasso was launched in the United Kingdom on 9 April 2009, where it went on sale for £11,495 for the 1.4-litre VTi, the most basic model with 6.4 L/100 km; 37 mpg_{‑US} (44 mpg_{‑imp}), while the most expensive was the 'Exclusive' with a 1.6-litre HDi engine and 4.6 L/100 km; 52 mpg_{‑US} (62 mpg_{‑imp}) at £15,595.

A facelifted version of the car was shown at the 2012 Paris Motor Show on 27 September 2012 and was on sale in Europe by November.

== Models ==
- Exclusive is consistently the most expensive trim for each market, with the biggest choice of engines and features. It is the only model to feature roof rails and a folding front passenger seat, making the storage space into the whole interior of the car except the driver's seat. Extras for the trim include: tinted windows, rear parking sensors, automatic windscreen wipers, a leather and chrome interior, pollen filter, and dual-zone automatic climate control, which allows for two varying temperature settings simultaneously in the vehicle.

=== Limited and Special Edition ===
- 90th Anniversary; the release of the Limited Edition 90th Anniversary C3 Picasso in August 2009 was the UK's third limited-edition model. It was created to commemorate 90 years of Citroën and has similar features to the Exclusive trim, sold at the same price and features the MyWay SatNav system, leather upholstery, and a commemorative badge on the dashboard emblazoned with the wording "90 Years". As bonus, it came equipped with £1,000 of extras and was released in an advertising campaign of Anniversary trims for other Citroën models at the same time as the launch of the Limited Edition Millennium trim in France. The model was limited to 150 cars in the UK, of which only one has been sold and registered for use.
- Blackcherry is a limited edition trim, available in the UK since November 2010 and based on the VTR+. It was sold with the 1.6-litre High-pressure Direct Injection (HDi) diesel engine. It was discontinued and replaced with the Code Red and Code White in January 2012, which have the same engine.
- Rossignol; first collection launched in November 2010, second in November 2011.
- Millennium; several trims were released in France under the Millennium moniker, including the: C1, C4, C4 Picasso, C5 and C5 Tourer. The model has 16-inch (41 cm) alloy wheels, the MyWay SatNav system and radio with built-in Bluetooth and dual-zone automatic climate control. The car was available in a metallic or pearlescent finish.
- Code Red/Code White was released in January 2012. The limited edition C3 Picasso Code Red and Code White replaced the Blackcherry in the UK. The Code has the same engine as the Blackcherry and has been finely tuned for a marginally increased fuel economy and lower carbon dioxide (CO_{2}) emissions. It features obsidian black bumpers and 17-inch (43 cm) Polar White or Cherry Red "clover" alloy wheels, and can be equipped with extra features, which include roof bars, curtain airbags, cruise control and a speed limiter. Body colours exclusive to the trim are Belle Ile Blue, Shark Grey and Cherry Red.
- Passion Bleus was released in France to celebrate the 2012 European Football Championship. The name is a tribute to the France national football team, which Citroën supports as a partner of the French Football Federation. The advertising campaign for the Passion Bleus involved French footballers, rallying champion Sébastien Loeb, and an online Facebook game "Le Pilote et le Bleu" (The Pilot and Blue). Other Citroën vehicles to receive a Passion Bleus trim were the: C1, C3, C4, C4 Picasso, and the Berlingo Multispace.
- Music Touch was launched in January 2013 in France. Created through a partnership with Samsung and Universal Music Group, the C3 Picasso Music Touch comes with a free white Samsung Galaxy Tab 16 GB. The obvious styling differences are the additional chrome trims and mirror covers, and white pearlescent paint. The Music Touch special series was also added to the C4 Picasso, C4 Aircross and Berlingo Multispace vehicles.

== Design and features ==
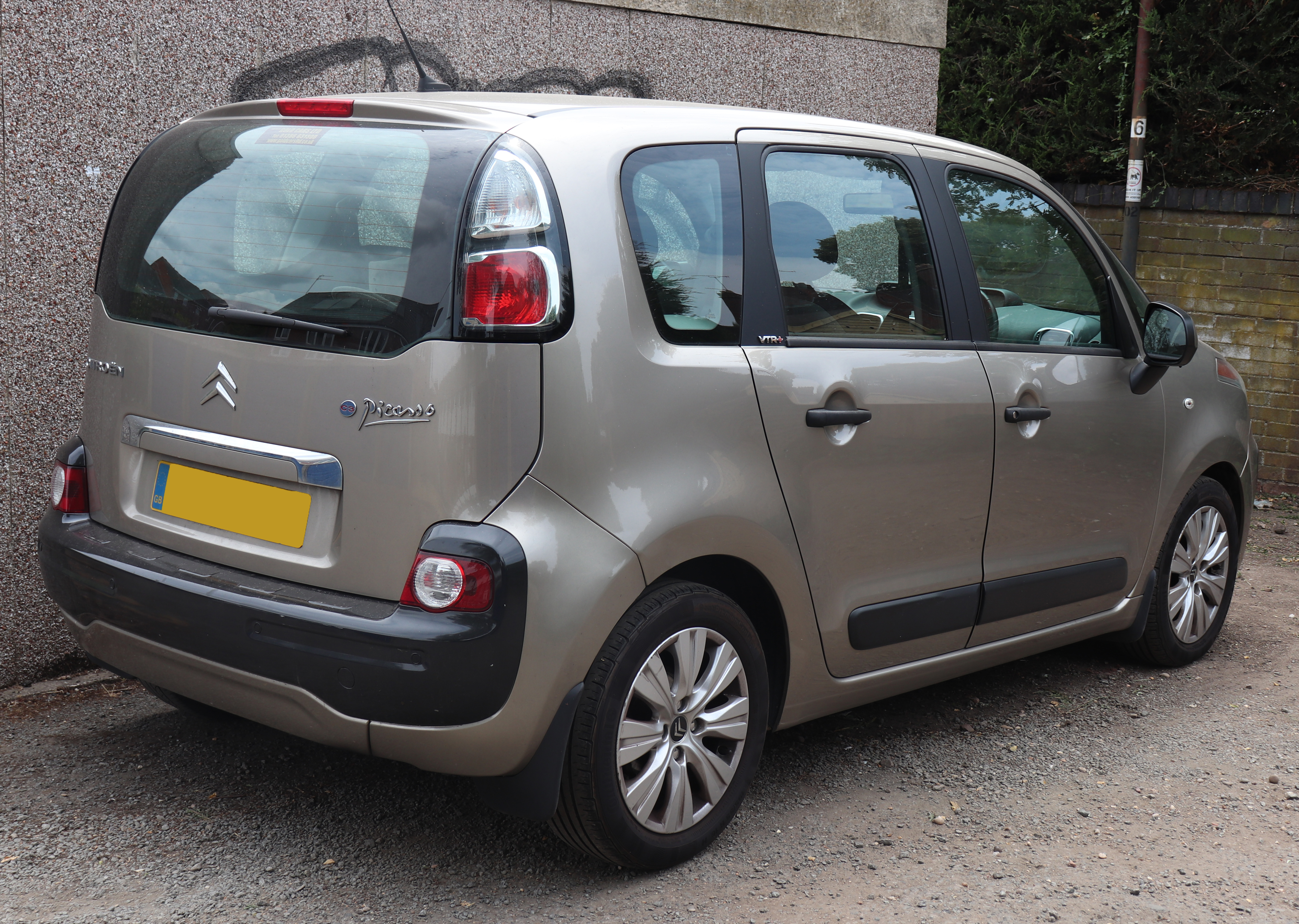
The rear of the C3 Picasso

All C3 Picasso models have an anti-lock braking system (ABS), Electronic brakeforce distribution (EBD), child locks, remote central locking and two front airbags. Electronic Stability Control (ESC), once an option, is now included across the range. The vehicle is only available as a 5-seater, but with all models the three rear seats can be folded flat to increase the boot capacity from 385 litres (13.6 cu ft) or 500 litres (18 cu ft) including the hidden compartment to store the parcel shelf, up to a maximum of 1,506 litres (53.2 cu ft). The Exclusive model features a folding front passenger seat to increase the storage space further. All models in the range have a "Mistral Maxi Taylor" woven cloth interior; according to Citroën, top European engineers and designers including Donato Coco and Jean-Pierre Ploué were involved in designing the vehicle.

Optional accessories are available for the range, including an aluminium roof rack capable of carrying 60 kg (132 lb) and kerbside lights in the door mirrors. Also available are: 16-inch (41 cm) and 17-inch (43 cm) alloy wheels with a choice of two patterns, chrome mouldings for the bumpers and doors, front fog lamps and cruise control, rear parking sensors, automatic lights (standard on some variants), and a speed limitation device – which are commonly used for safety reasons or to reduce fuel bills. A seatbelt reminder, which can be added to the passenger and rear seats, is fitted to the driver's seat as standard.

The chassis platform used for the C3 Picasso is a modified version of that in the Citroën C3 and the Peugeot 207, giving it a comparable wheelbase. The reuse of automobile platforms is commonplace, especially for Citroën because the Trnava plant builds the Peugeot 207 and the C3 Picasso. The parent company PSA Peugeot Citroën pools resources and manufacturing for some vehicles, and sometimes rebadges vehicles, combining design teams between two or more brands to create a shared product. Citroën placed a contractual obligation on the manufacturers to use green materials for the C3 Picasso range. These comprise ≥11% of the 170 kg (374.8 lb) of polymers on the vehicle, including the mudguards, parcel shelf and boot carpet. Citroën recommends the vehicle is serviced at least every two years, or at every 32,000 km (20,000 miles) for petrol models and 20,000 km (12,000 mi) for the HDi diesel models.

=== Engines ===
When equipped with the 1.6-litre VTi engine, the C3 Picasso Exclusive and VTR+ models are capable of a top speed of 188 km/h (117 mph) and 0–97 km/h (0–60 mph) in 10.6 seconds, sporting 89 kW; 122 PS (120 bhp). This 1.6-litre and a smaller 1.4-litre VTi petrol engine, were developed by PSA Peugeot Citroën and BMW, along with a 1.6 L diesel engine and the two 1.6 L HDi Airdream engines. Every model came with a 5-speed manual gearbox until 2011, when 6-speed manual and automatic (EGS6) manual versions were introduced, along with an eco-friendly start-stop system and regenerative braking technology in certain models, notably the Exclusive and Tendance models for the German market. According to Citroën, these two new features reduce CO_{2} emissions significantly and their introduction coincided with the release of a higher specification Airdream engine, the European emission standards (Euro 5) carbon dioxide emissions limits were lowered and the addition of low-rolling resistance tyres were added to the entire range. The tyres are specially designed to minimize wasted energy when the tyre rolls and have been estimated by the California Energy Commission to save 1.5–4.5% of fuel in a typical car.

At first, Citroën decided not to offer their new automatic EGS6 gearbox version in the UK due to the unfavourable exchange rate and costs, although this changed after a small number were privately imported for insurance classification purposes. The EGS6 gearbox became an option for the 1.6 L VTi engine models shortly after.

Starting with June 2015 production, Citroën replaced the older petrol engines with a 1.2-litre Pure Tech 110 motor. This new 3 cylinder 82 kW (110 hp) engine is paired with 5 speed manual transmission. CO_{2} emissions are 115 g/km. A 73 kW (98 hp) BlueHDi 100 diesel coupled to a 5 speed manual transmission replaced the earlier offerings. The EGS6 automatic transmission is no longer available.

The complete vehicle lineup includes multiple models and engine configurations, all with different specifications and tuning:

Full model line-up and engine availability
Model	Engines				
Model	1.4 L VTi 16v (95 bhp)	1.6 L VTi 16v (120 bhp)	1.6 L HDi 16v (110/115 bhp)	1.6 L HDi 8v (90 bhp)	1.6 L e-HDi 16v (90 bhp)
Advance (–2012)	Yes	—N/a	—N/a	—N/a	—N/a
Attraction (–2012)	Yes	—N/a	Yes	Yes	—N/a
Attraction (-2012)	Yes	—N/a	—N/a	Yes	—N/a
Aura (–2012)	Yes	Yes	Yes	—N/a	—N/a
Business (–2012)	—N/a	—N/a	—N/a	Yes	Yes
Business (-2012)	—N/a	—N/a	—N/a	Yes	Yes
Color Selection (–2012)	Yes	Yes	Yes	Yes	—N/a
Confort (–2012)	Yes	Yes	Yes	Yes	Yes
Confort (-2012)	Yes	Yes	Yes	Yes	Yes
Connexion (–2012)	—N/a	—N/a	—N/a	Yes	—N/a
Cool & Sound (–2012)	Yes	—N/a	—N/a	—N/a	—N/a
Exclusive (–2012)	Yes	Yes	Yes	Yes	Yes
Exclusive (-2012)	Yes	Yes	Yes	Yes	Yes
LX (–2012)	Yes	—N/a	—N/a	Yes	—N/a
Seduction (–2012)	Yes	Yes	Yes	Yes	Yes
Seduction (-2012)	Yes	Yes	Yes	Yes	Yes
SX (–2012)	Yes	Yes	Yes	Yes	—N/a
Tendance (–2012)	Yes	Yes	Yes	Yes	Yes
VT (–2012)	Yes	—N/a	Yes	Yes	—N/a
VT (-2012)	Yes	—N/a	—N/a	Yes	—N/a
VTR+ (–2012)	Yes	Yes	Yes	Yes	—N/a
VTR+ (-2012)	Yes	Yes	—N/a	Yes	—N/a
Limited/Special Edition models
90th Anniversary (–2012)	—N/a	—N/a	Yes	—N/a	—N/a
Blackcherry (–2012)	—N/a	—N/a	—N/a	Yes	—N/a
By Carlsson (–2012)	—N/a	Yes	Yes	—N/a	—N/a
Code (2012 only)	—N/a	—N/a	—N/a	Yes	—N/a
Collection (–2012)	Yes	Yes	Yes	Yes	Yes
Collection (-2012)	Yes	Yes	Yes	Yes	Yes
Millennium (–2012)	Yes	Yes	Yes	Yes	Yes
Millennium (-2012)	Yes	Yes	Yes	Yes	Yes
Music Touch (-2013)	Yes	Yes	Yes	Yes	Yes
Passion Bleus (2012 only)	Yes	—N/a	—N/a	—N/a	—N/a
Rossignol (–2012)	—N/a	—N/a	—N/a	Yes	—N/a
Selection (–2012)	Yes	Yes	Yes	—N/a	Yes
Selection (-2012)	Yes	—N/a	—N/a	Yes	—N/a

Petrol engines
Model	Year	Engine code	Displacement (cc, cu in)	Power	Torque	0–100 km/h (0–62 mph) (seconds)	Top speed	Transmission	CO_{2} emissions (g/km)
1.2-litre PureTech 12v	2015–	EB2DT	1,299 cc (79 cu in)	81 kW (110 PS; 109 bhp)	205 N⋅m (151 lb⋅ft)	11.8	187 km/h (116 mph)	5-speed manual	115
1.4-litre VTi 16v	–2012	EP3	1,397 cc (85 cu in)	71 kW; 96 PS (95 bhp)	184 N⋅m (136 lb⋅ft)	12.2	179 km/h (111 mph)	5-speed manual	149
1.4-litre VTi 16v	2012–	EP3	1,397 cc (85 cu in)	71 kW; 96 PS (95 bhp)	184 N⋅m (136 lb⋅ft)	12.2	179 km/h (111 mph)	5-speed manual	145
1.6-litre VTi 16v (Latin American C3 Picasso + C3 Aircross)	2010–	EP6	1,587 cc (97 cu in)	82 kW; 112 PS (110 bhp)	147 N⋅m (108 lb⋅ft)	14	165 km/h (103 mph)	5-speed manual	220
1.6-litre VTi 16v	2009–	EP6	1,598 cc (98 cu in)	89 kW; 122 PS (120 bhp)	160 N⋅m (118 lb⋅ft)	10.9	188 km/h (117 mph)	5-speed manual	149
1.6-litre VTi 16v	2009–	EP6	1,598 cc (98 cu in)	89 kW; 122 PS (120 bhp)	160 N⋅m (118 lb⋅ft)	11.5	188 km/h (117 mph)	6-speed automatic (EGS6)	137
Diesel engines
1.6-litre BlueHDI	2015–	DV6	1,560 cc (95 cu in)	73 kW (99 PS; 98 bhp)	254 N⋅m (187 lb⋅ft)	13.3	179 km/h (111 mph)	5-speed manual	101
1.6-litre HDi 16v	–2012	DV6	1,560 cc (95 cu in)	82 kW; 112 PS (110 bhp)	366 N⋅m (270 lb⋅ft)	11.2	183 km/h (114 mph)	6-speed automatic (EGS6)	125
1.6-litre HDi 16v	–2012	DV6	1,560 cc (95 cu in)	82 kW; 112 PS (110 bhp)	366 N⋅m (270 lb⋅ft)	11.2	183 km/h (114 mph)	6-speed manual	125
1.6-litre HDi 16v	2012–	DV6	1,560 cc (95 cu in)	86 kW; 117 PS (115 bhp)	366 N⋅m (270 lb⋅ft)	11.2	183 km/h (114 mph)	6-speed manual	125
1.6-litre HDi Airdream 8v	2009–	DV6	1,560 cc (95 cu in)	67 kW; 91 PS (90 bhp)	312 N⋅m (230 lb⋅ft)	13.5	174 km/h (108 mph)	5-speed manual	112
1.6-litre e-HDi Airdream 8v	–2012	DV6	1,560 cc (95 cu in)	67 kW; 91 PS (90 bhp)	230 N⋅m (170 lb⋅ft)	15.7	177 km/h (110 mph)	6-speed automatic (EGS6)	109
1.6-litre e-HDi Airdream 8v	2012–	DV6	1,560 cc (95 cu in)	67 kW; 91 PS (90 bhp)	230 N⋅m (170 lb⋅ft)	15.7	177 km/h (110 mph)	6-speed manual	109

== Safety ==
Euro NCAP test results 5 door LHD MPV (2009)
Test	Points	%
Overall:	4 /5 stars	
Adult occupant:	86	81%
Child occupant:	37	76%
Pedestrian:	16	43%
Safety assist:	3	40%

The European New Car Assessment Programme (Euro NCAP) tested a C3 Picasso Confort 90 bhp (67 kW; 91 PS) model with standard equipment, including: a single forward airbag for each front seat, a speed limitation device, but no ESC. The vehicle was scored on the basis of: child and adult injury, including whiplash risk from the seating, a pedestrian front impact rating, safety equipment and clear labels detailing how to disable some features. The results of the front end tests were mixed, with the bumper scoring all available points, but the vehicle was penalised for the lack of protection and the potential damage caused if a pedestrian is struck by the bonnet. Protection inside the car was scored highly for almost every seat, and for adult and child protection; it lost points for its use of forward-facing restraints, which can be fatal in an accident if an infant is hit by an airbag. The C3 Picasso was also penalised for offering very poor whiplash protection in the driver's seat – scoring nothing in two of the three tests and then losing points for the position of the unadjusted restraint. Overall, the vehicle scored four of five stars, less than most vehicles the Euro NCAP compares it with, which were released around the same time.

=== Recalls and Watchdog investigation ===
On 20 June 2010, 611 C3 Picassos built between January and March 2010 were recalled due to incorrectly routed fuel pipes, which were believed to have been in contact with the heat shield. This fault may have caused chafing and may lead to a fuel leak. The models were built between January and March 2010 and were sold in the UK. On 24 August 2010, all 13,234 Picassos sold in the UK were recalled because the windscreen trim could deteriorate, and could eventually detach, leading to a loose-fitting windscreen.

In May 2011, all 24,091 C3 Picassos in the UK were recalled for a safety modification, following complaints and an investigation by BBC consumer affairs programme Watchdog into brakes that could be activated on the passenger side of the right-hand drive vehicles. The problem occurred because of the way the vehicles were modified for right-hand-drive. The investigation showed that although the brake pedal had been moved to the right, it was still connected to a mechanism on the passenger side. This was covered by felt carpet and meant that both the front passenger and driver could activate the brakes. A further investigation by Watchdog later found the same problem in other Citroën models and some vehicles produced by Renault and Peugeot, some of which were registered in 2002. All three manufacturers worked with the Vehicle and Operator Services Agency (VOSA) to identify the severity of the problem but no vehicles were found to be affected enough to issue recalls.

8,815 Picassos built between January and May 2011 for the UK market were recalled on 2 September 2011 when it was discovered that the battery cable was too short and could cause gearbox failures and in turn stall the engine. The faulty earth return cable was replaced. Despite the recalls, the vehicle continued to sell well in the UK and has won numerous awards.

== Reviews ==
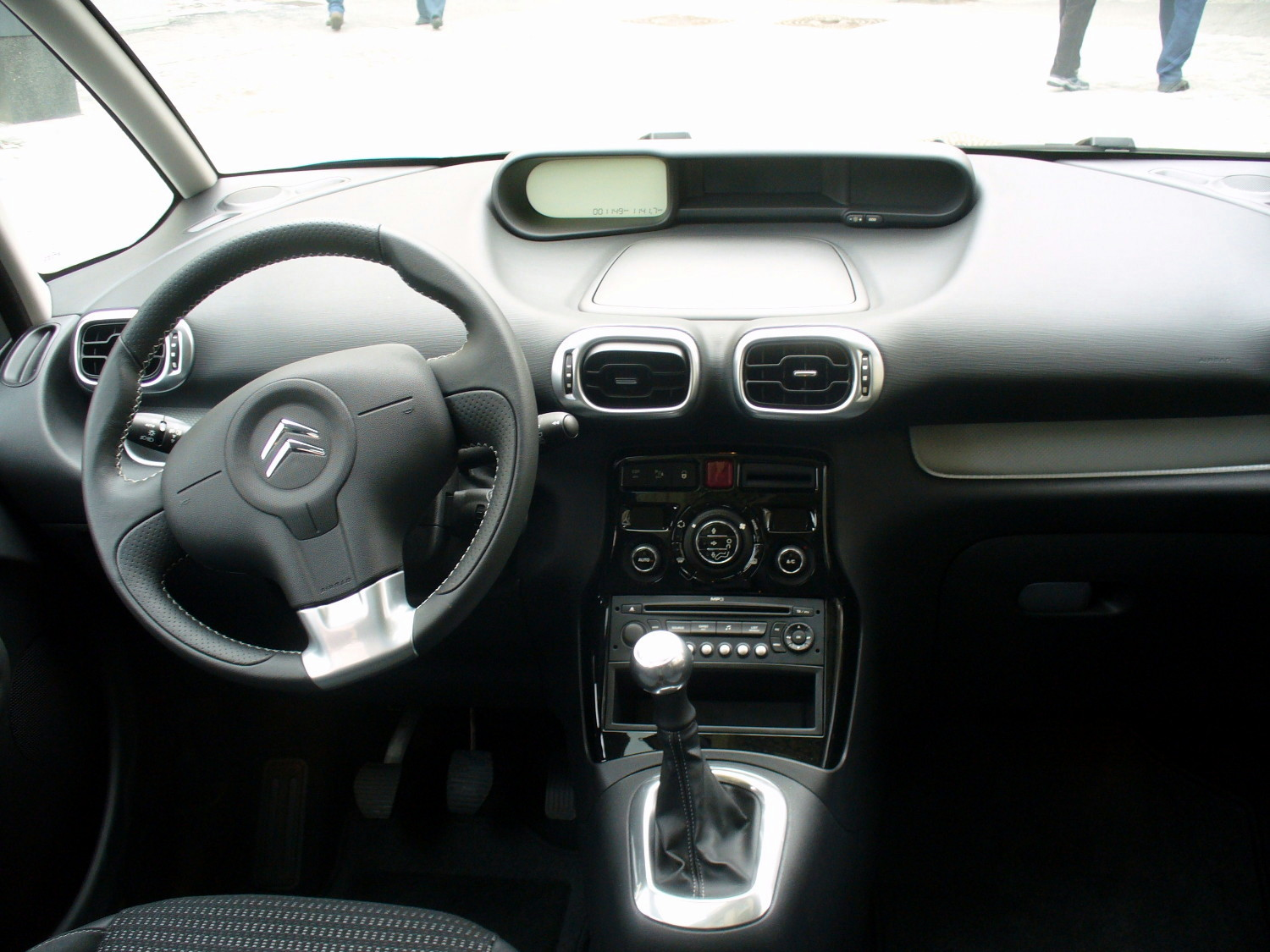
Reviews of the hard plastic interior were mostly negative.

Critics praised the Citroën C3 Picasso in reviews for its ergonomics, Bauhaus-inspired styling, ease of use and the amount of space offered. Many reviewers criticised the interior, which they said felt "cheap". The quality and reliability of the petrol engines was also criticised by most reviewers as "sluggish" and struggling to carry the weight of the vehicle, although the diesel engines feedback was more positive as they are able to cope much better and run smoother. Reviewers' comments about the tight turning radius of the vehicle were favourable. The combination of the panoramic three-part windscreen, thin door pillars and high seats, which together increase the visibility of the road – led one reviewer to compare it with a greenhouse.

The car has three monitors on the dashboard, the first monitors the status of important components, while the second controls the sound system, and the last is a rev counter, digital speedometer and the fuel gauge. CNET described the speed gauge monitor as clear and "close to the driver's natural line of sight", but criticized the other two monitors for being unreadable and possibly dangerous if used by the driver while the car is moving. Some reviewers complained about the vehicle's soundproofing, which could not adequately conceal the screech of the wind. The engine at high speed received mixed reviews, while a number of reviewers reported a fault with the screenwash bottle, which can freeze in cold weather and blow a fuse when used. The reviewer for European Car of the Year 2010 called the nominated C3 Picasso fuel efficient, but said it had "dull steering".

=== Awards ===
UK publication Top Gear Magazine awarded the C3 Picasso "Family Car of the Year" in 2008, stating "This is what a 21st century family car should look like". Michael Harvey, the editorial director of the magazine admitted they had taken a chance as the model was not available in the United Kingdom until the following year. In 2009 when the car was finally launched the awards increased, first with "Best MPV" at What Diesel's Car of the Year Awards, "Scottish MPV of the Year" at the Scottish Car of the Year Awards, "Best Supermini MPV of the year" at "Auto Express New Car Awards" and finally "Design of the Year" at the Fleet World Honours. The vehicle was nominated for European Car of the Year in 2010, but received the lowest overall score of any candidate, finishing last, in seventh place. The JD Power survey in 2011 announced the C3 Picasso as the best MPV on the market, with a satisfaction rating of 83.1% and five stars overall, but with the lowest rating given to the exterior quality at three stars. Many reviewers had complained of poor fitting and the finish used on the exterior.

== Advertising ==
"DOG" was created by H Suresnes advertising agency in France and released in June 2010. The advertisement shows a dog made up of various items, including a purse, swimming goggles, blow-dryer and shoes, wandering around the streets to the English-language song "Somebody Come And Play" by Joseph G Raposo. In the last scene the dog is invited into the boot of a C3 Picasso by a family leaving for a holiday; the dog fits into the car with enough space to seat everyone comfortably.

Another advertisement for the vehicle range was "Ghostbusters Reloaded", which was produced by Euro RSCG Paris. It shows three futuristic Ghostbusters in a C3 Picasso battling a monster in the style of the Ghostbusters character Stay Puft Marshmallow Man. The monster is the size of a tall building and is made up of items including bicycles, suitcases and tyres. As the monster is defeated, it disassembles and the items fit into the boot of the Picasso. The music used is a remix of the Ray Parker Ghostbusters theme tune performed by the Street Life DJs. The advertisement's strapline is; "The New Citroën C3 Picasso: The Spacebox".

== 2012 facelift ==
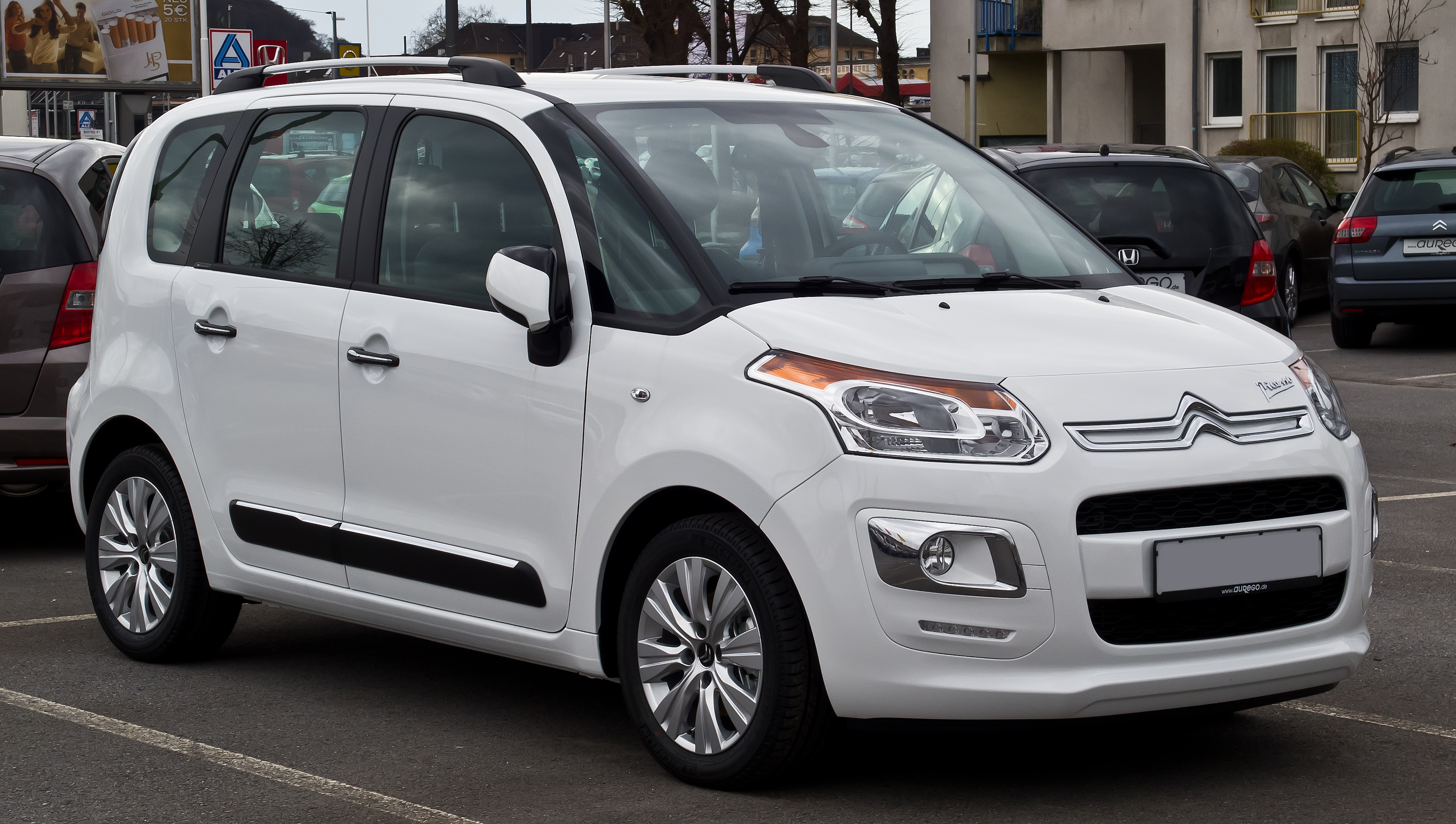
2012 facelift

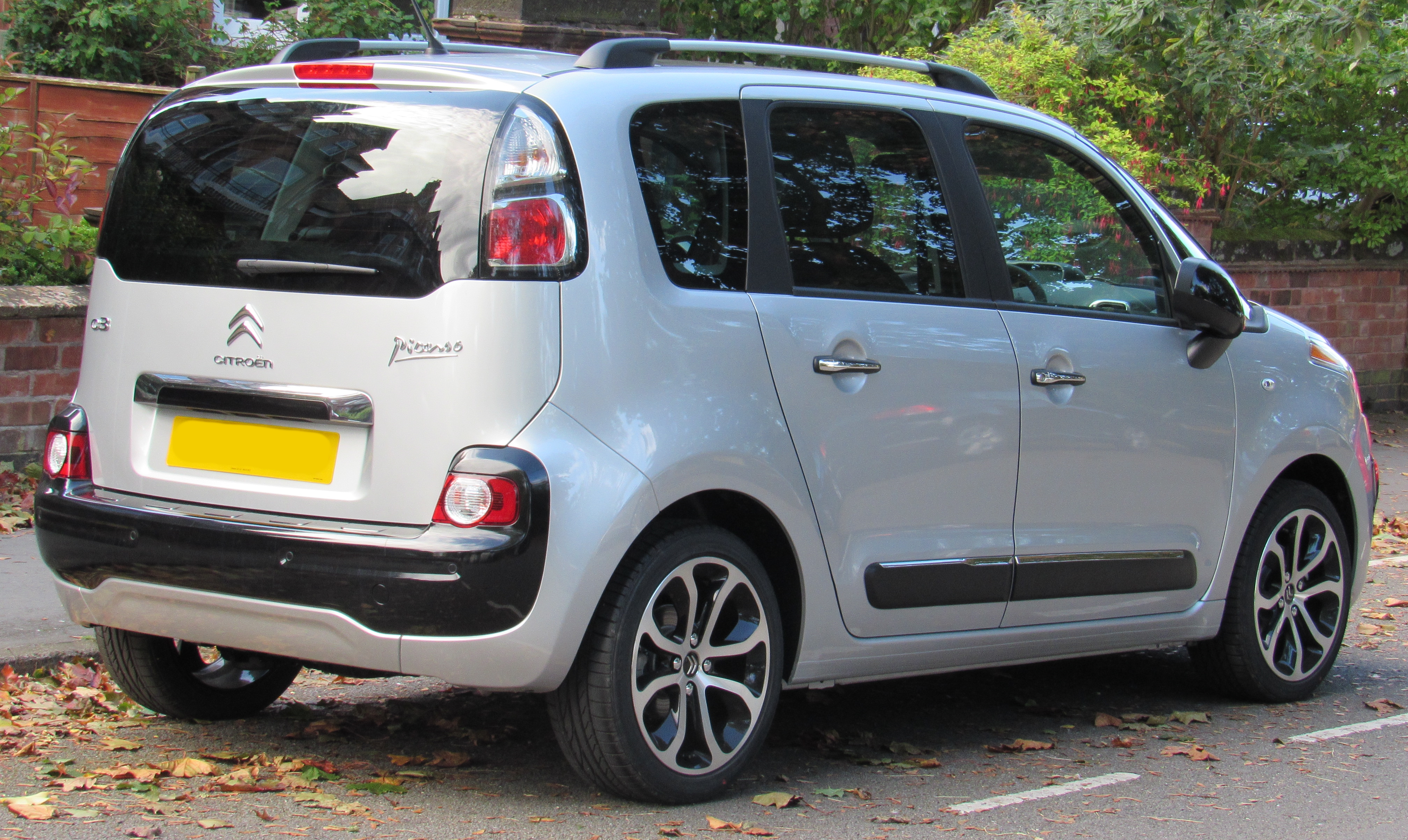
2012 facelift

The facelift of the Citroën C3 Picasso appeared first at the 2012 Paris Motor Show on 27 September. The new eMyWay SatNav system, located on the central console, is more functional than the previous model, allowing connection to a reversing camera (available as an extra), which displays on the console screen. LED daytime running lamps and fog lamps with built-in cornering lamps, which illuminate the roadside, are also non-standard features on the facelifted C3 Picasso. In addition, Citroën has added two new exterior paint colour options; "Pearlescent white" and "Ink blue" to the vehicle. The front grille now features Citroën's new branding, joining the two chrome chevron badge in the form of a crown.

The Spanish market launch took place in November 2012 with four trim choices, the least expensive being the Attraction with a 95 bhp (71 kW; 96 PS) VTi engine at €12,250 and the most expensive being the Exclusive with a 115 bhp (86 kW; 117 PS) HDi engine at €18,475. The UK launch took place in December 2012.

== 2017 successor ==
In September 2010, Citroën do Brasil launched the Citroën C3 Aircross in Brazil and Argentina. The car is a C3 Picasso-based mini SUV with styling differences including: raised suspension, chrome roof bars and mirror covers, side skirts, and a rear spare tyre.

A successor for the C3 Picasso was previewed at the Geneva Motor Show in March as the C-Aircross Concept. The Citroën C3 Aircross, as it became called, launched in late 2017, introducing with it the new Citroën SUV designation. Auto Express reported the vehicle is taking design cues from the C-Aircross Concept, and will make the transition from MPV to an SUV design.

== Worldwide sales and production figures ==
Year	Production	Sales	Notes
2008	1,600	0	Was sold in some European countries for a small portion of the year.
2009	91,700	86,500	Officially launched throughout Europe and production increased to ≥850 units per day to keep up with demand. Citroën expected sales of between 90,000 and 100,000 units, a target which was not met.
2010	77,100	83,700	Worldwide sales decreased by 3.2% in 2010 and production was cut by about 16% in anticipation of lower sales in 2011, possibly caused by the European recession – Europe is the biggest market for the vehicle.
2011	TBA	101,612	The Trnava plant was closed between 28 October and 18 November as production had exceeded demand. Citroën said overall sales had fallen by 13.3% since 2010 and announced that three PSA plants could be closed.
2012	TBA	84,700	
2013	TBA	90,000	
2014	TBA	65,300	

657,807 C3 Picasso models have been produced in Trnava plant.

== See also ==
- List of Citroën vehicles
