= Donato Coco =

Italian automobile designer

Donato Coco is an Italian car designer born in Foggia, Apulia, Italy in 1956. He is known for designing automobiles for Citroën, but even more well-known for designing some of Ferrari's recent cars.

Coco was Head of Design at Lotus from 2009 to November 2014.

His works include:

- Ferrari 458
- Ferrari California
- Citroën ZX at Bertone
- Citroën Saxo
- Citroën Xsara
- Citroën Xsara Picasso
- Citroën C3 Lumière concept, Citroën C3 Air concept and Citroën C3 Pluriel concept
- Citroën C2
- Citroën C1
- Citroën C3 (First generation)
- Citroën C3 Pluriel
- Citroën C4
- Ocqueteau RC10
