= Citroën Argentina =

Former automotive manufacturer in Argentina

Citroën Argentina S.A.
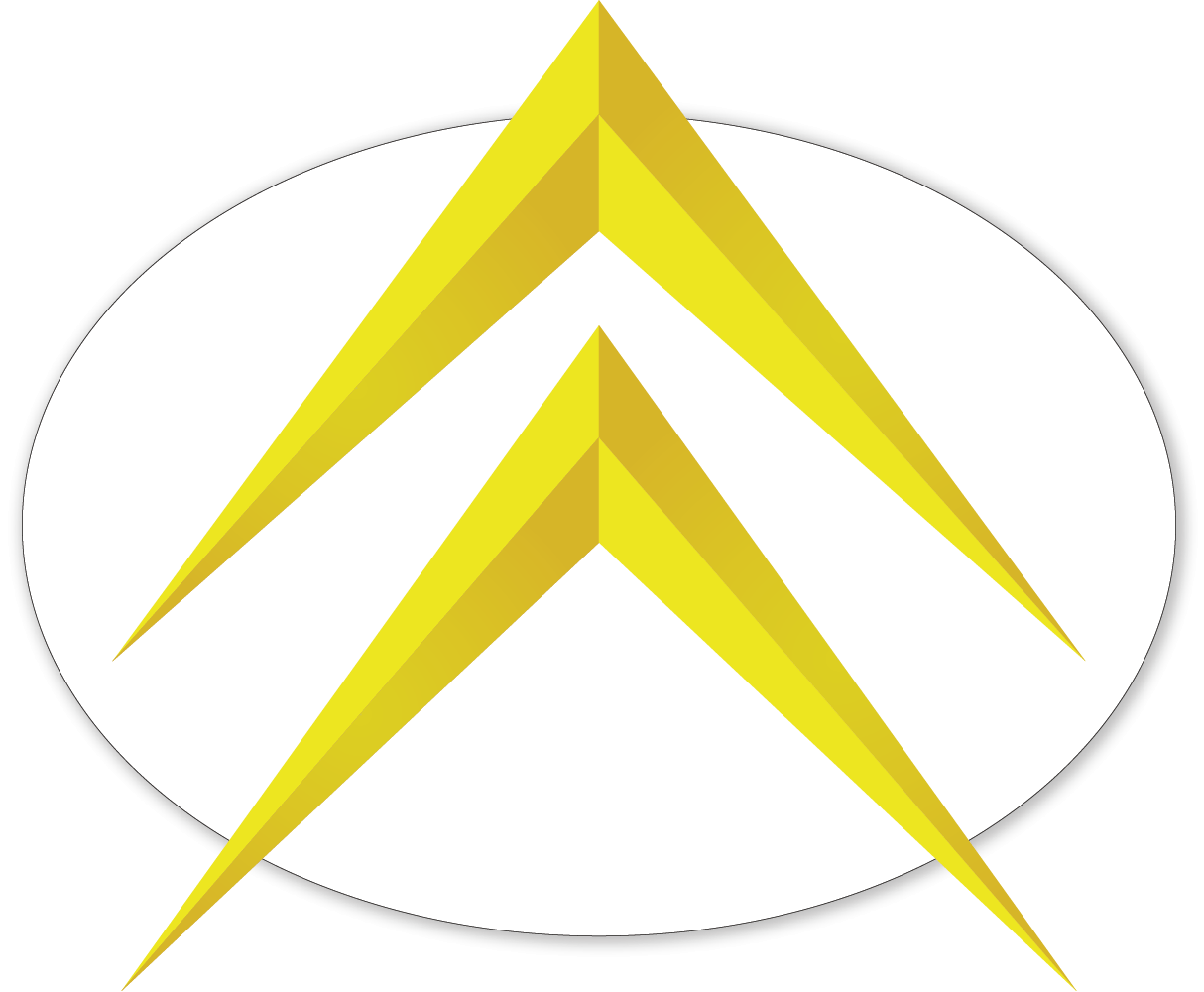

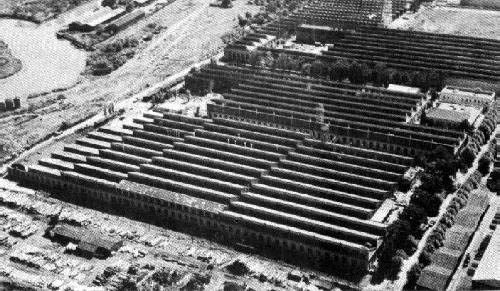
- The plant in Barracas, Buenos Aires
- Type: Subsidiary
- Industry: Automotive
- Founded: 1959
- Defunct: 1979; 47 years ago
- Successor: PSA Group Argentina (1998–2021); Stellantis Argentina (2021–pres.)
- Headquarters: Barracas, Buenos Aires, Argentina
- Area served: Argentina
- Products: Automobiles, panel vans
- Parent: Citroën

Citroën Argentina S.A. was the Argentine subsidiary of French automotive manufacturer Citroën, which produced vehicles of the brand in the country. Established in 1959 and headquartered in Barracas, Buenos Aires, it operated in the country for 30 years, until the economic crisis during the military government reorganisation process forced the company to cease its operations.

The Citroën brand would return to Argentina as part of the local PSA Group subsidiary that took over Peugeot and Citroën operations after acquiring rights to the Peugeot brand from the defunct company Sevel Argentina.

In 2021, PSA Group Argentina became part of Stellantis Argentina.

== History ==
=== Background: Imported models ===
From the beginning of the 20th century to the end of the 1950s, the automotive market in Argentina was dominated almost exclusively by cars of North American origin. European cars were rare.

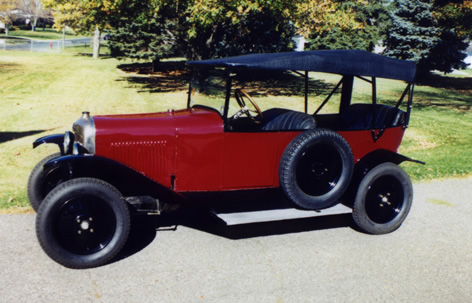
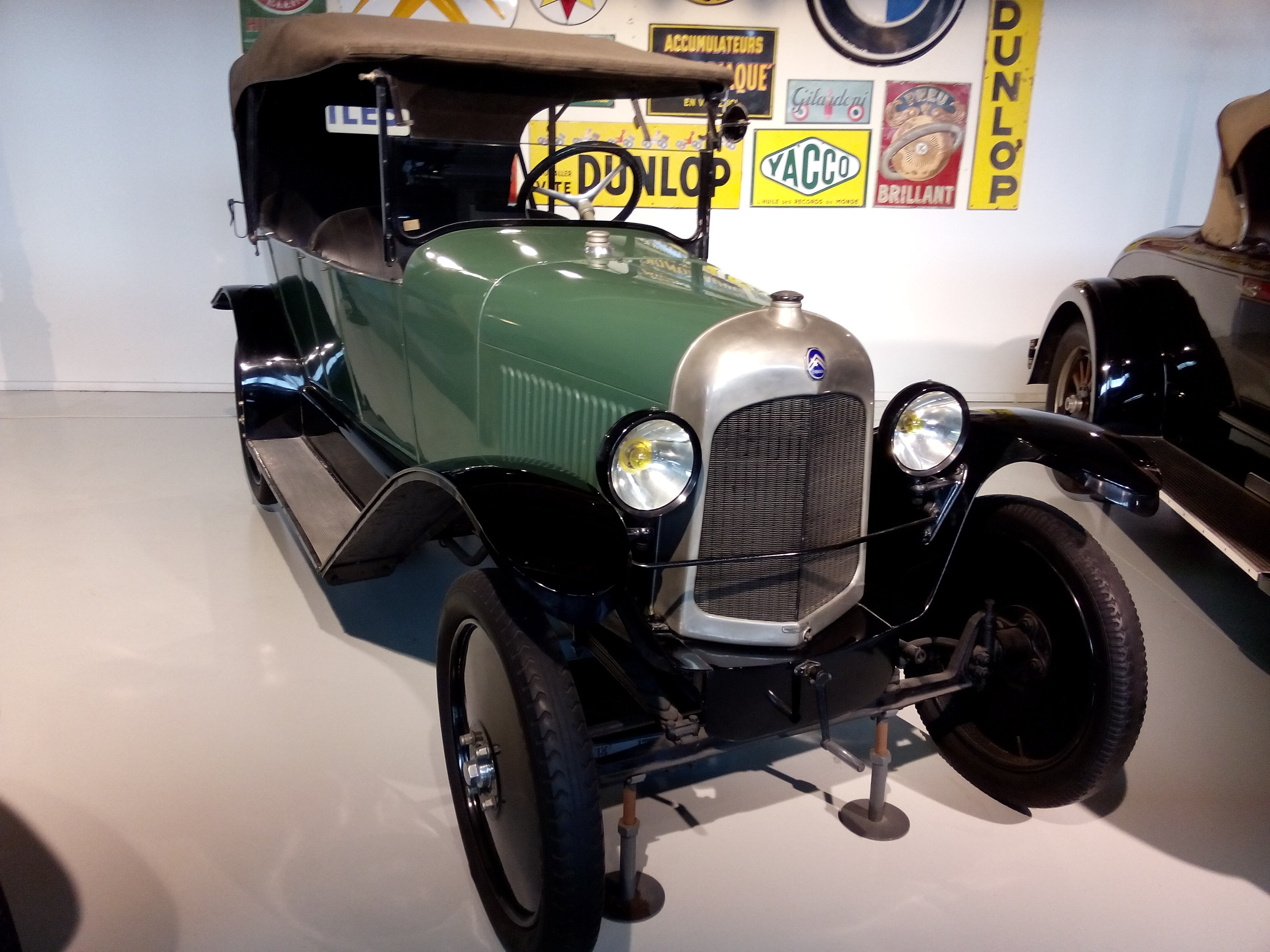
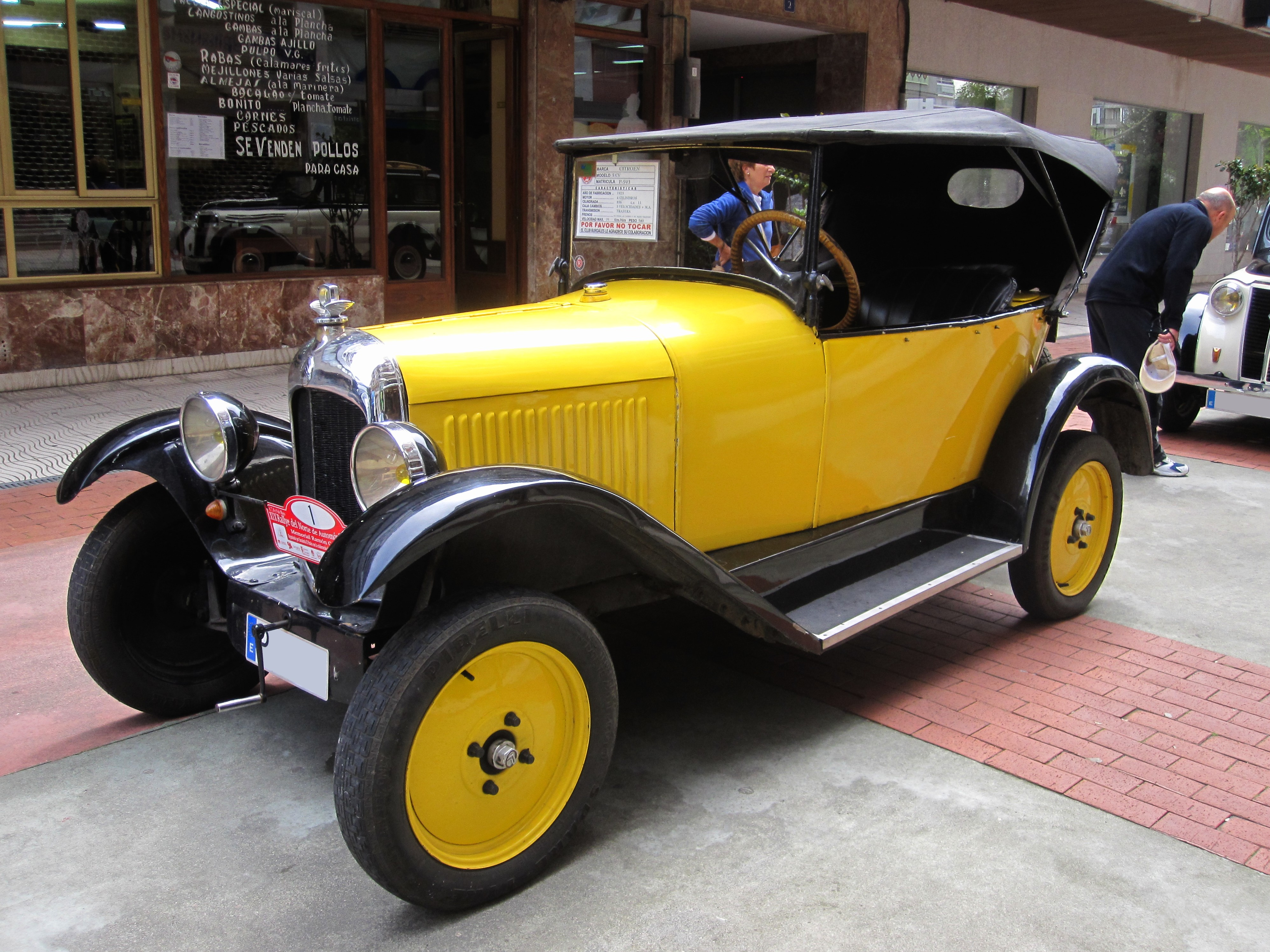
The first Citroen models imported to Argentina were the Type A (left) and Type B (center), and Type C (right).

The first Citroën models arrived in Argentina at the beginning of the 1920s. Imported individually or, more rarely, by request, some Type A with 10 horsepower and Type B2 vehicles entered the country. In 1925, the firm Vengerow y Cía was authorized to sell Citroën and Voisin cars in Argentina. The firm, which had its showroom at 1165 Montevideo Street, began by importing the 5CV, commonly known as Treflé (clover leaf) due to the particular arrangement of its three seats. The model became very famous in Argentina because several Argentine movie stars drove Treflé models, including Sofía Bozan, Iris Marga, Pepe Arias, and Florencio Parravicini. Other body versions of the 5CV could also be purchased, such as the 2-seater Torpedo and the 2-seater Cabriolet with the particular "boat tail."

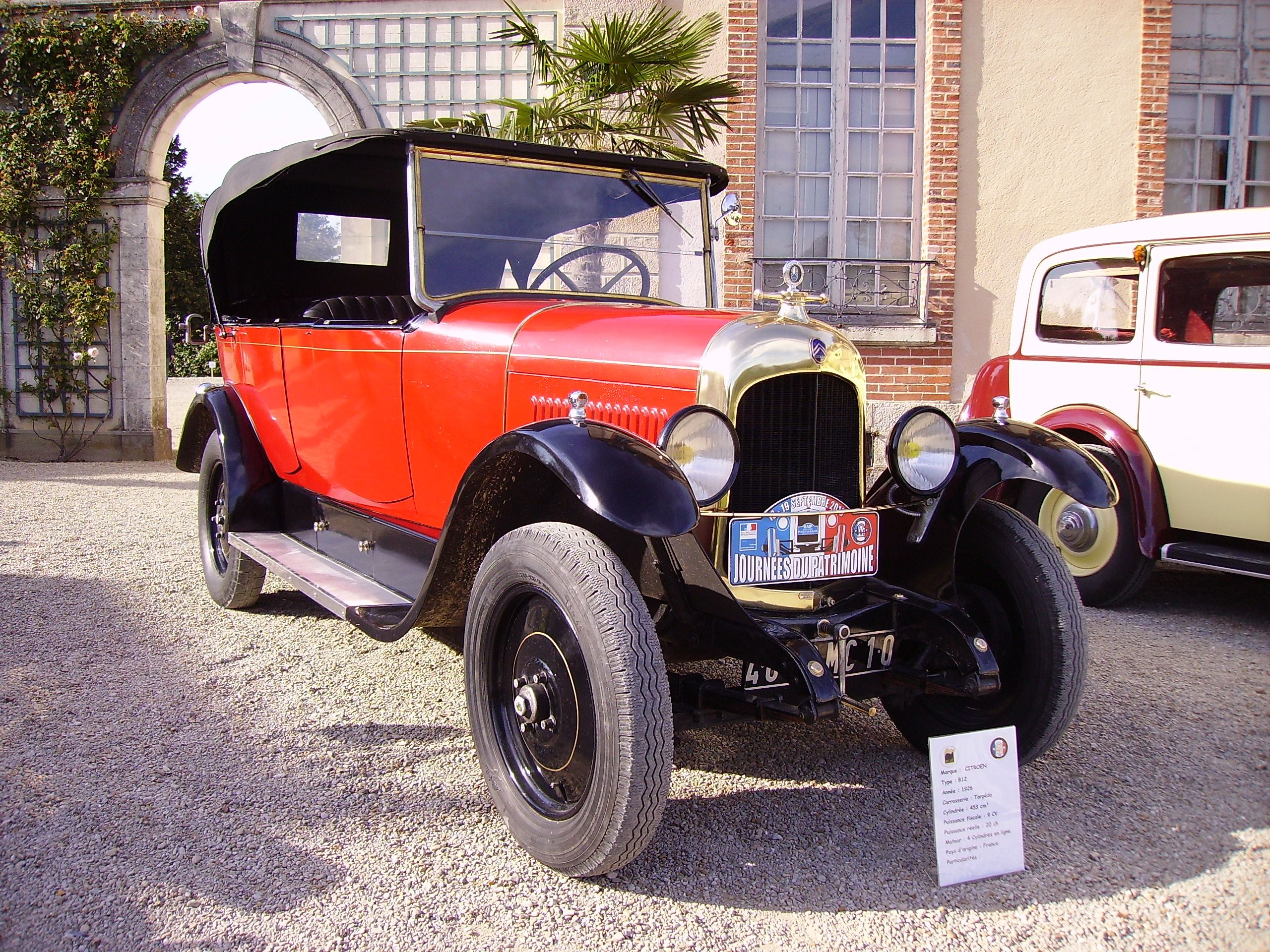
The Type B12 model began to be imported in 1926.

In 1926, the Vengerow firm expanded its range with the B12 (20 hp) and B14 (22 hp) models in 15 different body versions. In 1929, the company changed its name to "Gesta Vengerow y Cía" and presented the brand new models C4 and C6 the Hall of Buenos Aires. Because, in those years, Argentina drove on the left, the versions imported by the Vengerow firm were fully manufactured for England.

In 1931, Citroën's representation in Argentina passed to the company "Talleres Metalúrgicos San Martín" with its headquarters at Calle Florida 983 and an exclusive service station for customers on Avenida Alvear in Buenos Aires. This firm continued with the importation of C4F (30 HP) and C6F (45 HP) models, but not for much longer. It was not until 1939 when Citroën set commercial offices at 464 Paseo Colón street and presented the 7CV (in its latest version: 7C) 11CV models, in the B, BL, Familiale, and Cabriolet versions, and only a few 15 SIX G and Type R23 trucks.

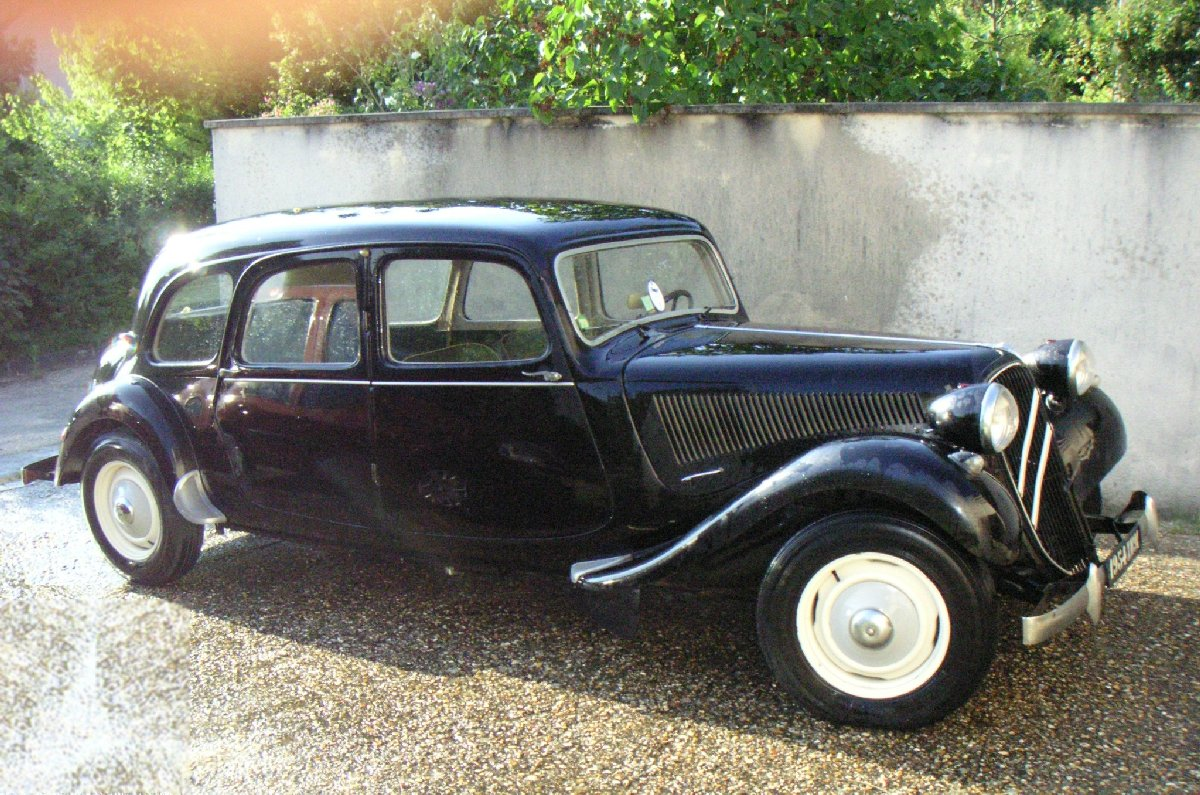
The Traction Avant was a huge success in Argentina.

During the Second World War, the importation of vehicles from France ceased. They restarted in 1946 with an official dealership, Teodoro Gilotaux, located at 3628 Alvear Avenue, and its own workshop at 3626 Canning Street. This dealership brought the Traction Avant model, also known as "11 Ligero" (light eleven). The car quickly earned a solid reputation, being advertised as "the ideal car for the plain and the mountains" and sold very well in Argentina. It also included in its catalog the 11 Normale, Cabriolet, and Familiale, as well as the King of the road: the 15 SIX D. Racers Rodolfo Brusco and Jorge Ansaldo travelled from Buenos Aires to New York in 1951 on a 1947 Traction Avant. In 1953, some races exclusively for Traction Avant cars were held in Autódromo de Buenos Aires.

In 1947, the commercial subsidiary of Citroën was founded in Buenos Aires under the name of SIVARA, which imported the chassis of the Type 45 6-cylinder heavy trucks, and in 1951, Automobiles Citroën S.R.L appeared, with its offices and salesroom at 1117 Venezuela Street in the Federal Capital.

The 2CV did not appear in Argentina before because there were, until the end of 1955, tax regimes that applied to all cars whose weight was less than one ton, which was a serious obstacle for the importation of vehicles. Towards the end of the 1950s, the first DS and ID appeared, and they were quickly nicknamed Citroën Sapo (frog), but they were not well received due to their unusual design at the time and their high price.

=== Local production ===
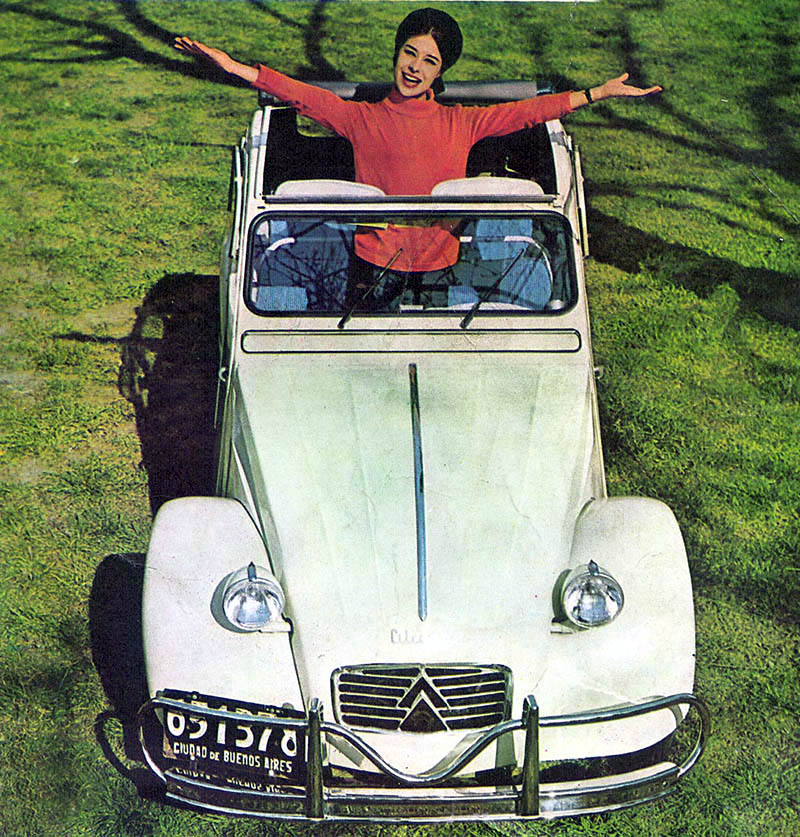
Advertisement for the 2CV model of 1965

In 1958, the Citroën 2CV made its official appearance, thanks to another dealership that imported them: Staudt y Cía. S.A. These models from France and Belgium caused great astonishment and, as in European countries, their followers began to grow since, they perfectly adapted to Argentina's varied geography; pampas and mountains, hot or cold, dirt or asphalt. The environment did not seem to matter to the 2CV and sales grew day by day. In this context, the Citroën plant in France decided to grant the concession for the manufacturing of these vehicles in Argentina. Therefore, Decree 12,267/59 authorized the filing of capital for the assembly of the 2CV in Argentina, while Resolution 90/59 of the Ministry of Industry and Mining approved the manufacturing plans for category B-segment automobiles presented by the Societe Anonyme André Citroën of Paris.

On March 25, 1959, "Citroën Argentina Sociedad Anónima" was founded by decree number 3,693/59, granted by the Executive Power of the Nation, and legal status was granted on May 8 of the same year. The assembly of 2CV AZL vehicles began on February 18, 1960, in a provisional plant located in the town of Jeppener in Brandsen Partido, 80 kilometers from the Federal Capital. This plant was a sewing machine factory, "Pfaff Bromberg S.A.I.C.", which had very advanced machining centers for the time. Because of that, and through an agreement with the directors of this company, about 100 cars and 20 AZU vans were assembled there. The plant continued to work for Citroën Argentina S.A. until 1980 under the name of EMECA and afterwards belonged to PSA Peugeot-Citroën of Argentina.

Meanwhile, the final plant was being built in the old Catita kitchen factory, on a 75,000 m2 site located at 3220 Zepita Street, in the industrial neighborhood of Barracas, Buenos Aires. It was inaugurated on May 31, 1960, when the 2CV number 101 left the assembly line. In the same year, Citroën presented a booth exhibition at the International Motor Show in Buenos Aires, in which it built a test track where roads and streets of the country were reproduced. The 2CVs, which were driven by test pilots, took visitors for a ride around this track and performed various demonstrations. One DS19, two ID19, and three ID breaks were exhibited there. After the show ended, it went up for auction, eventually sold for a price three times higher than the base price.

Initially, the plant had a covered area of 51,000 m2, distributed in two buildings, Edificio Norte and Edificio Sur, with nearly 1,200 employees. On July 22, 1960, panel vans began to be assembled. The North building, with 23,000 covered m2, centralized the mechanical manufacturing and assembly of parts, while the South Building, with 28,000 m2, focused on the manufacture of bodywork, protection, painting, and the final assembly of the vehicles. A third building, the East Plant, stored all the autoparts to supply the dealership network, commercial, advertising, selling, after sales, guarantees areas, and even mechanics academies. Citroen Argentina exported autoparts to France, Spain, Chile, and Uruguay, and fully assembled vehicles to Paraguay, Bolivia, and Cuba.

In the beginning, the vehicles were assembled with parts received from France. As the factory was assembled, new manufacturing processes were incorporated and the parts and assemblies were nationalized. The production of vehicles increased constantly, from 992 units built in 1960 to 6,954 in 1964, to reach 15,280 units per year in 1969. By 1966, Citroën Argentina already had 30,000 units circulating on the streets.

==== 3CV ====
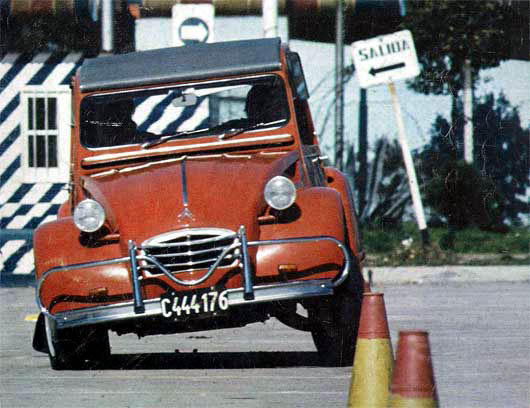
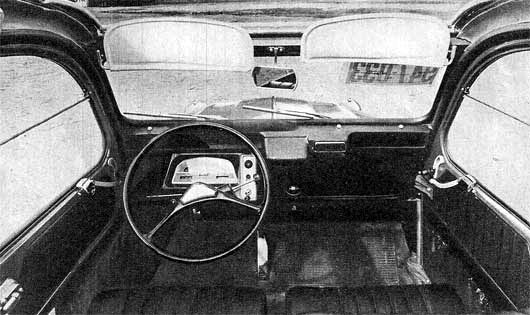
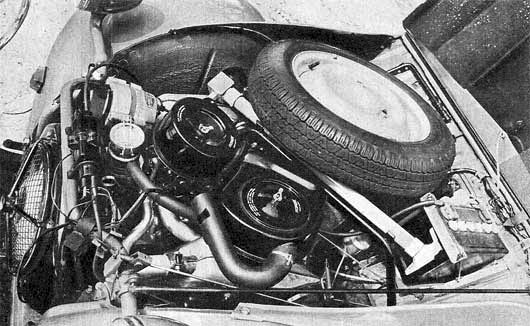
Argentine Citroën 3CV front, interior and engine pictured in 1972

El 1º de noviembre de 1969 Citroën Argentina lanza el modelo 3CV AZAM-M28 con el motor de 602 cc. y 32 HP. a 6.250 R.P.M (motor M28), con alternador de 12 volts, primero con filtro de aceite en el interior del cárter (primer montaje) para luego, en 1971, incorporar el filtro del lubricante reemplazable en el exterior del cárter (segundo montaje). En el aspecto exterior las únicas differencias con el 2CV eran: los faros traseros, que son los del Dyane 6 francés y en los faritos indicadores de giro delanteros de forma rectangular, combinando el diseño con los traseros, ubicados en el frente de los guardabarros (desaparecen los faros indicadores laterales). En su interior no hay mayores differencias con el 2CV AZAM salvo en el velocímetro que ahora indica 120 km/h! La caja de velocidades es de diseño totalmente nuevo, propio de Citroën Argentina basada en la caja del ami 6 francés, (continua como opcional el embrague centrífugo), los tambores de frenos delanteros pasan a ser de 220 mm. de diámetro y las transmisiones son, en el 3CV, homocinéticas (con ocho crucetas) También se incorporan amortiguadores hidráulicos en las 4 ruedas. En 1970 tanto los 2CV como los 3CV incorporan las puertas delanteras de apertura «normal» según las normas de seguridad vigentes en ese año. Aparece la furgoneta AK, con la mecánica del 3CV, en versiones AKR (con vidrio lateral) y AK (sin vidrio lateral).

==== Ami 8 Club ====
At the end of 1970, Citroën Argentina incorporated a completely new model into its production: the Ami 8 Club, with identical mechanics to the 3CV (second assembly) except for the carburetor, which was double body (Solex 26–35 CSIC) that powered to 35 HP. The press described Ami 8 as a "transition car", however, it was not like that, since it competed directly with models from the medium/small range such as the Renault 6 or the Fiat 128. Citroën de Argentina only manufactured the break (station wagon) version of the Ami 8, the club, which, unlike its French pair, had front drum brakes. In the frame or chassis, it incorporates a stabilizer bar (anti-roll) in the front, suspension cylinders, and springs with a larger diameter than in the 2CV and 3CV. The inertia beaters continued and the wheel bearings were larger (from 35x72x27mm. to 36x76x29mm.) These features would be incorporated into the 3CV in 1971, with the exception of the stabilizer bar. The Ami 8 had a top speed of 113 km/h.

==== Mehari ====
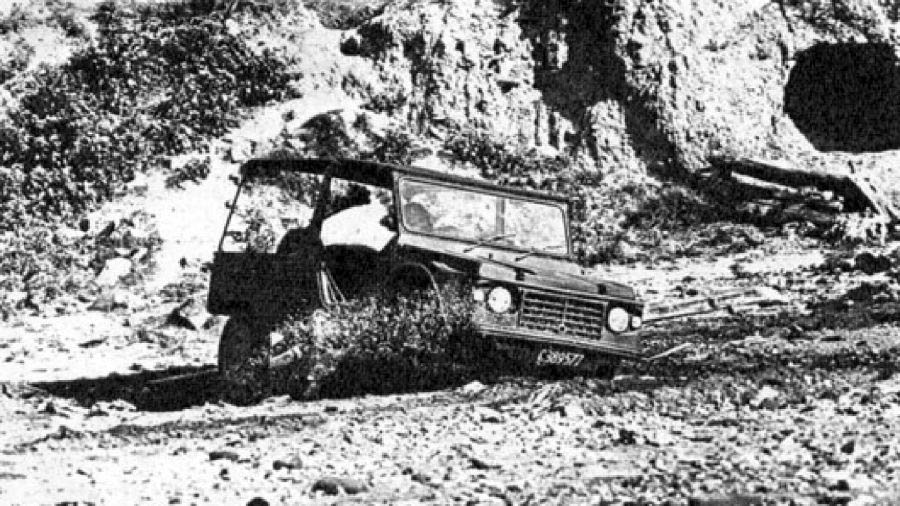
Argentine Mehari being tested in 1972

Also in 1971, Citroën Argentina launched a new model, the Méhari, an off-road roadster oriented to the young public, also thought for rural and coastal areas, due to be built in polyester reinforced with fiberglass, unlike the European model made in ABS. Fiberglass was chosen because there were no machines in South America to mold plastics in that size. This bodywork was manufactured in Uruguay by the Dasur company.

The mechanics were exactly the same as the 3CV and red was its only color (although a series in blue was manufactured for the Tucumán police). The Méhari had a load capacity of 400 kg.

=== Closure ===
Despite the increase in production compared to the previous year and plans to produce the GS model in Argentina, the company decided to finish its business in the country due to the government's economic policies.

In their Annual Report published in 1980, Citroen Argentina stated that

... in 1979, the production of vehicles reached 10,479 against the 8,226 produced in the previous year, signifying an improvement of 27.60%. In terms of sales, 9,962 were made against the 9,160 made the previous year, denoting an increase of the order of 9%. Such a number of sales, which corresponds exclusively to domestic vehicles, should increase with the 1,786 sales of imported cars, made in the second half of the year.

On the contrary, we have not had the necessary financial support to be able to position ourselves at the level required by the current market.

It is not beyond the knowledge of those of us who in one way or another are linked to this industry, that the opening of imports would necessarily force investments that would allow a reduction in operating costs and an improvement in the units produced.

On December 31, 1979, Citroën Argentina S.A. ceased activities, with a total of 223,442 vehicles produced.

=== Revival ===
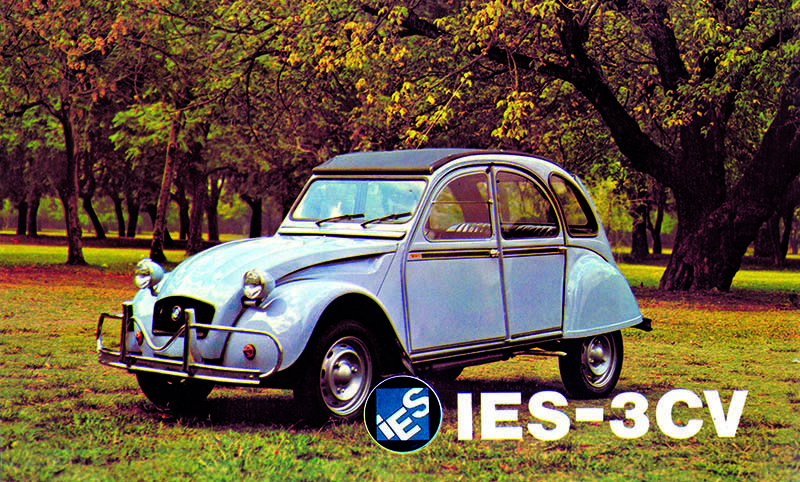
IES 3CV, a rebadged Citroen 3CV

Two years after of the departure of Citroën from Argentina, engineer Eduardo Sal-Lari bought the market share of the subsidiary. During some time, Sal-Lari kept the license of the brand through the import of vehicles from France. In 1982, Sal-Lari acquired parts to locally produce the 3CV engine and gearbox. In January 1983, Sal-Lari was authorised to produce automobiles in the country. A factory was built in Gowland, Mercedes Partido, and the first cars were launched in November. Motor car builder Oreste Berta (who had supervised the IKA Torino car that competed in the 1969 Nürburgring 84-hour race) helped Sal-Lari in his project, improving the 3CV engine, expanding it from 625cm3 to 850cm3 and from 28 to 45HP. It was also switched from air cooling to water cooling.

Therefore, "Industrias Eduardo Sal-Lari" (IES) revived the 3CV models, rebadged as IES 3CV. At a price of AR $388 million, the IES 3CV was the cheapest car in Argentina. Models were produced in the old factory in Barracas while the Gowland plant was under construction. Sal-Lari also rebadged other Citroën models, such as the Méhari (renamed "Safari") and the 3CV panel van ("Carga"). Nevertheless, and due to lack of support from the national government, Sal-Lari was removed from the company in 1989 and IES was closed in 1990.

== Vehicles produced ==
Name	Type	Produced	Image
2CV / 3CV (Note: The 2CV was produced 196069, being replaced by the "3CV" in 1969.)	economy family car panel van	1960–79	
Ami 8 Club (Note: Local name for the "Ami" model.)	economy family car	1970–79	
Méhari	Roadster	1971–79	
