= Stellantis Argentina =

Argentine subsidiary of Stellantis

Stellantis Argentina S.A.
- Type: Subsidiary
- Industry: Automotive
- Predecessor: FCA Argentina (1996–2021); Peugeot-Citroen Argentina (1998–2021)
- Founded: 2021; 5 years ago
- Headquarters: El Palomar (Peugeot/Citroën); Ferreyra (Fiat), Argentina
- Area served: Argentina, Brazil
- Key people: Antonio Filosa (COO for South America)
- Products: Automobiles, pickups
- Brands: Citroën; Fiat; Peugeot
- Parent: Stellantis

Stellantis Argentina S.A. is the Argentine subsidiary of international conglomerate Stellantis which produces and markets Citroën, Fiat, and Peugeot vehicles in the country. Established in 2021, the company is successor of several firms that had operated in Argentina as subsidiaries or licensors for these brands, such as Fiat Argentina (then FCA Argentina), and Groupe PSA Argentina.

Stellantis produces its vehicles in the former Sevel Argentina and Fiat Concord factories located in El Palomar, Buenos Aires, and Ferreyra, Córdoba, respectively.

== History ==
=== Citroën brand in Argentina ===
French automotive Citroën began to produce vehicles in 1960 with the launching of 3CV, being operative until 1979. In 1998, Sevel Argentina sold its share percent to PSA Group, which brought the Citroën brand back to Argentina.

=== Fiat brand in Argentina ===
After the dissolution of Sevel, Fiat resumed operations in Argentina in 1996. The company built a new plant in Ferreyra with an investment of USD600 million to produce its new models, the Palio and Siena. The company also took over Iveco operations in the country. Nevertheless, the 2001 economics crisis caused the plant was closed. It would not be resume operations until 2008.

The plant in Ferreyra has been producing the Fiat Cronos since 2018. In 2014, the company was renamed "FCA Argentina" after the Fiat and Chrysler merger. That allowed the Argentine subsidiary to import Chrysler Corporation brands to the Argentine market such as Jeep, Ram and Alfa Romeo among others.

=== Peugeot brand in Argentina (1960–2021) ===
The first Peugeot automobiles were brought to Argentina in 1957 through the establishment of DAPASA (acronym from "Distribuidora Automóviles Peugeot Argentina S.A.") which imported the 403 model. The society was then renamed "IAFA" and began producing the 403 in the new factory in Berazategui, Greater Buenos Aires from 1960 to 1965. During that period, a total of 22,000 units were manufactured.

IAFA launched the 404 model in 1962, which would become a success, being produced until 1980 by IAFA and continued shortly by Sevel Argentina. At the moment of being discontinued, a total of 152,000 units had been produced. In 1960, a new plant in El Palomar, Buenos Aires, was opened to produce Peugeot models, with its first cars being assembled in 1963.

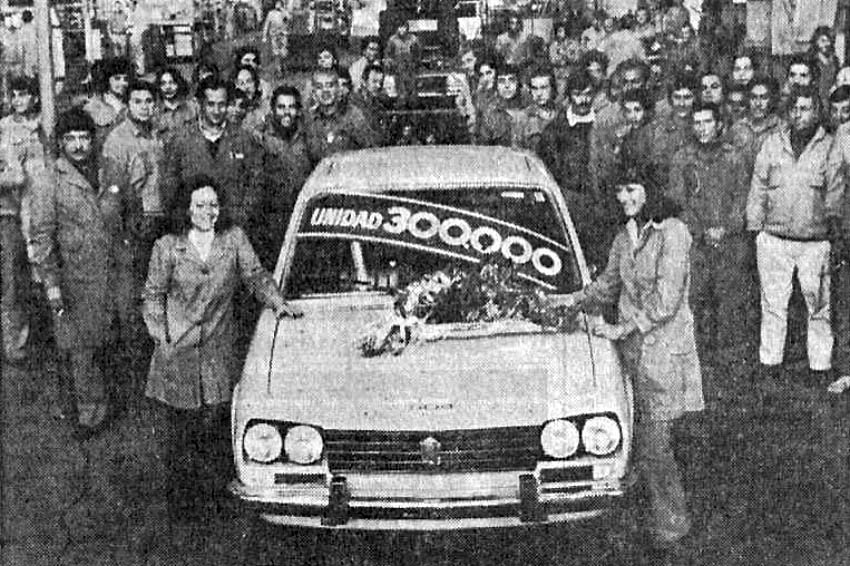
The vehicle number 300,000 produced by Peugeot in Argentina was a 504, which was its most successful car

After some irregularities detected in the IAFA's operations, a new company, SAFRAR ("Sociedad Anónima Franco Argentina de Automotores") was created in 1965. The company took over production of Peugeot models, launching the T48 (403 pickup) in 1967. Until 1973, when it was discontinued, 16,000 units were assembled. In 1969, SAFRAR launched the Peugeot 504 which would become not only an emblematic model for the brand but its most successful car for decades. Furthermore, at the moment of being discontinued, it had been the most produced models in the history of Argentine automotive, surpassing other legends like Renault 12 and Ford Falcon. It was produced until 1999 with near 400,000 units assembled. In 1973, the 404 pickup replaced its 403 counterpart, being produced until 1981.

In 1981, SAFRAR and Fiat Concord S.A. agreed to form a joint venture named Sevel Argentina. The merger was in response to law No Nº 21.932 of 1979, ordering the restructuring of the Argentine automotive industry. At first, Sevel resumed production of models previously made by both companies, but shortly afterwards it began to add new models.

That same year Sevel launched the Peugeot 505, which was produced until 1995 with 92,000 units sold including a station wagon version, and the 504 pickup, produced until 1999 after 92,000 units.

After several years without new releases, in 1992, Sevel launched the Peugeot 405, which would be produced until 2001 totalising 51,000 units. The 306 was launched in 1996 and also discontinued in 2001 after 50,000 units produced in 4 and 5-door versions.

The Argentine economic crisis that began in 1994 affected the automotive production among other sectors. After Fiat and Peugeot split in 1995, PSA Group took over production of Peugeot and Citroën vehicles under the name of "Peugeot-Citroën de Argentina". Sevel was eventually liquidated, rescinding its Peugeot licence in March 2000, well into the 1998–2002 Argentine great depression.

The first model under PSA's parenthood was the Partner, a panel van rebadged from the Citroën Berlingo, in 1998. Peugeot expanded its range of models with the 206 and its successor, the 207 (designed by Argentine and Brazilian engineers) with almost 500,000 units producing for both until 2016. The 307 was produced from 2004 to 2011 for a total of 183,000 units. It was replaced by the 408 in 2010.

In 2012, PSA launched the 308, another C-segment automobile, which had a similar platform than the discontinued 307.

=== Stellantis Argentina (2021–present) ===
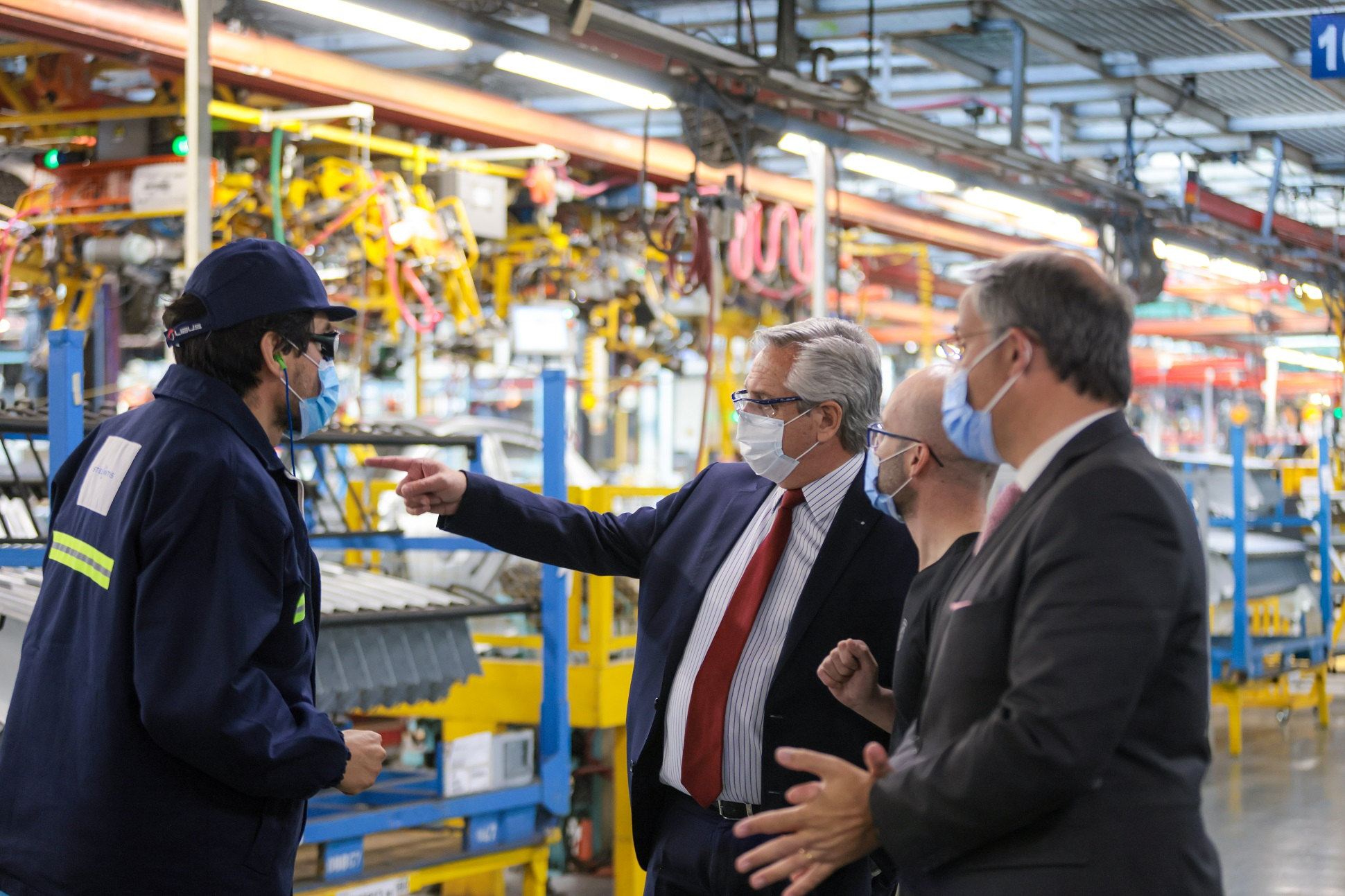
President of Argentina Alberto A. Fernández during a visit to the Stellantis plant in El Palomar, October 2021

When Stellantis took over Argentine subsidiaries' operations, the company announced that some models would be discontinued, those were Peugeots 308 and 408 and Citroën C4, manufactured in the El Palomar plant that had belonged to Sevel (since 1981) and previously to SAFRAR. Those changes were in order to focus on the production of the 208.

In 2021, Stellantis was the lead manufacturer in South America with a 30% share, with a sales growth of 48% compared with 2020. The company also published a list of most selling cars in the region, where Fiat Cronos was the most successful model in Argentina. Stellantis also stated that the company expect to release 16 new models between 2022 and 2025. That will include 28 restylings and 7 electric and hybrid cars. In 2022, Stellantis stated that 70% of its production was exported to other markets, mainly Brazil.

In May 2026, Stellantis Argentina announced they would discontinue production of Peugeot Partner and its counterpart Citroën Berlingo, both assembled at the plant located in El Palomar, Buenos Aires, which had been produced in Argentina since 1998. That decission was based on safety requirements and plant modernization so the subsidiary wanted to focus on vehicles with bio-hybrid technology and more modern global platforms. The models will be replaced by similar vehicles manufactured in Brazil.

== Current models produced ==
As of May 2026:

Previous manufacturer	Marque	Name	Type	Orig.	Released	Image
FCA Argentina	Fiat	Cronos	Subcompact	BRA	2018	
No previous manufacturer	Fiat	Titano	Mid-size pickup	ITA	2026	
PSA Argentina	Peugeot	208	B-segment	FRA	2020	
No previous manufacturer	Peugeot	2008	B-segment	FRA	2024	
No previous manufacturer	Ram	Dakota	Mid-size pickup	ITA	2026	

== Past models produced ==
Since 2021, when Stellatins was established:

Previous manufacturer	Marque	Name	Type	Orig.	Produced	Image
PSA Argentina	Citroën (Note: Rebadged model.)	Berlingo	Panel van	FRA	1998–2026	
PSA Argentina	Peugeot	Partner	Panel van	FRA	1998–2026	

=== Citroën past models (1998–2021) ===
List of Citroën vehicles produced by PSA in Argentina until Stellantis was established:

Manufacturer	Name	Type	Orig.	Produced	Image
PSA Argentina	C4	Compact	FRA	2007–14	
PSA Argentina	C4 Lounge	Compact	FRA	2014–21	

=== Fiat past models (1996–2021) ===
List of vehicles produced by Fiat Auto Argentina until Stellantis was established:

Manufacturer	Name	Type	Orig.	Produced	Image
Fiat Argentina	Siena	Subcompact	ITA	1997–2002, 2007–16	
Fiat Argentina	Palio	B-segment	ITA	1997–2002, 2008–16 2012-18	

=== Jeep past models (1994–2021) ===
Manufacturer	Name	Type	Orig.	Produced	Image
Jeep Argentina	Grand Cherokee	SUV	USA	1997–2000	
Jeep Argentina	Cherokee	SUV	USA	1997–2000	

=== Peugeot past models (1960–2021) ===
List of vehicles produced by Peugeot in Argentina since 1960 to 2021 until Stellantis was established:

Manufacturer	Name	Type	Orig.	Produced	Image
IAFA	403	Sedan / Pickup (Note: Produced 1965–73.)	FRA	1960–65	
IAFA	404	Sedan / Pickup (Note: Produced 1973–81.)	FRA	1962–65	
SAFRAR	404	Sedan / Pickup	FRA	1965–80	
SAFRAR	504	Sedan / Pickup (Note: Produced 1981–99.)	FRA	1969–80	
Sevel	504	Sedan / Pickup	FRA	1980–99	
Sevel	505	D-segment / Station wagon (Note: Named "Break".)	FRA	1981–95	
Sevel	405	D-segment	FRA	1992–99	
PSA	306	C-segment	FRA	1995–99	
PSA	206	B-segment	FRA	1999–2008	
PSA	307	C-segment	FRA	2004–11	
PSA	207 Compact	B-segment	FRA	2008–16	
PSA	308	C-segment	FRA	2012–21	
PSA	408	C-segment	FRA	2010–21	

== Imported models ==
Models from the brand's country of origin, except where it indicates:

- Citroën Basalt (Brazil, 2025–)
- Citroën C3 (Brazil, 2003–)
- Citroën Aircross (Brazil, 2024–)
- Citroën C3 Aircross (Brazil, 2010–2021)
- Citroën C3 Picasso (Brazil, 2009–2015)
- Citroën C4 Hybrid (Spain, 2026–)
- Citroën C4 Aircross (Japan, 2013–15)
- Citroën C4 SpaceTourer (Spain, 2017–20)
- Citroën C4 Cactus (Spain/Brazil, 2017–24)
- Citroën Grand C4 SpaceTourer (Spain, 2017–20)
- Citroën C5 (France, 2003–12)
- Citroën C5 Aircross (France, 2020–23)
- Citroën C-Elysée (Spain, 2016–20)
- Citroën DS3 (France, 2010–)
- Citroën DS4 (France, 2011–)
- Citroën Xsara Picasso (Brazil, 2001–12)
- Dodge Journey (Mexico, 2008–20)
- Fiat 500 (Poland/Mexico, 2008–23)
- Fiat 500X (Italy, 2018–21)
- New Fiat 600 (Poland, 2025–)
- Fiat Argo (Brazil, 2017–)
- Fiat Bravo (Brazil, 2017–)
- Fiat Bravo (Brazil, 2010–14)
- Fiat Doblò (Brazil, 2012–19)
- Fiat Fastback (Brazil, 2024–)
- Fiat Fiorino (Brazil, 1980–)
- Fiat Idea (Brazil, 2005–16)
- Fiat Linea (Brazil, 2009–16)
- Fiat Marea (Brazil, 1998-2007)
- Fiat Mobi (Brazil, 2016–)
- Fiat Pulse (Brazil, 2022–)
- Fiat Punto (Brazil, 2007–18)
- Fiat Qubo (Brazil, 2011–16)
- Fiat Stilo (Brazil, 2004–10)
- Fiat Strada (Brazil, 1999–)
- Fiat Novo Uno (Brazil, 2010–21)
- Fiat Uno Fire (Brazil, 2004-14)
- Fiat Tipo (Turkey, 2017–2020)
- Fiat Toro (Brazil, 2016–)
- Jeep Renegade (Brazil, 2016–)
- Jeep Cherokee (United States, 2017–2021)
- Jeep Compass (Brazil, 2017–)
- Jeep Commander (Brazil, 2022–)
- Jeep Grand Cherokee (United States, 2023–)
- Jeep Patriot (United States, 2009–14)
- Jeep Wrangler (United States, 2022–)
- Jeep Gladiator (United States, 2022–)
- Peugeot 106 (France, 1997–2001)
- Peugeot 2008 (Brazil, 2016–24)
- Peugeot 301 (Spain, 2016–19)
- Peugeot 3008 (France, 2021–)
- Peugeot 406 (France, 199?–2004)
- Peugeot 407 (France, 2005–10)
- Peugeot 408 (France, 2026–)
- Peugeot 508 (France, 2012–17)
- Peugeot 5008 (France, 2021–)
- Peugeot 605 (France, 199?–2000)
- Peugeot 607 (France, 2001–200?)
- Peugeot 806 (France, 199?–2000)
- Peugeot 807 (France, 2003–?)
- Ram Rampage (Brazil, 2024–)
- Ram 1500 (United States, 2013–)
- Ram 2500 (Mexico, 2014–)
