= Industria Argentina Vehículos de Avanzada =

Argentine automotive company

IAVA
- Industry: Automotive
- Founded: 1971
- Founder: Fiat Argentina dealers
- Defunct: 1985; 41 years ago
- Fate: Filed for bankruptcy
- Headquarters: Martínez, Buenos Aires, Argentina
- Area served: Argentina
- Products: Performance cars
- Brands: Fiat
- Parent: Fiat Concord (1971–80); Sevel Argentina (1980–85)

Industria Argentina de Vehículos de Avanzada (abbrevriated IAVA) was an automotive company created in 1971 by 16 owners of Argentine Fiat dealerships. Headquartered in Martínez, Buenos Aires, IAVA was the first manufacturer of performance vehicles in Argentina, being a subsidiary of Fiat Concord and then Sevel Argentina until it was closed in 1985.

As Abarth did in Italy, the goal of IAVA was to provide the Argentine industry with a higher performance version of the Argentinian Fiat 128. The philosophy was to use the platform of the 128, but change the engine to a transversely mounted 1100 cubic centimeter four cylinder. With this new engine IAVA offered, in addition to the increase in power, more comfort, and even aerodynamic accessories for the 128.

== History ==
IAVA was established in 1971 after an initiative of Carlos Marsengo, then Director of Fiat Concord, the Argentine subsidiary of Fiat S.p.A. It was believed that Marsengo had been given approval to establish a performance vehicles division from Italy.

The first models were assembled in the Fiat plant in Caseros, Buenos Aires, but short after production moved to Martínez, on Fondo de la Legua avenue. The first president of IAVA was Gerónimo Grossi, and Marcelo Zunnino was appointed as Director.

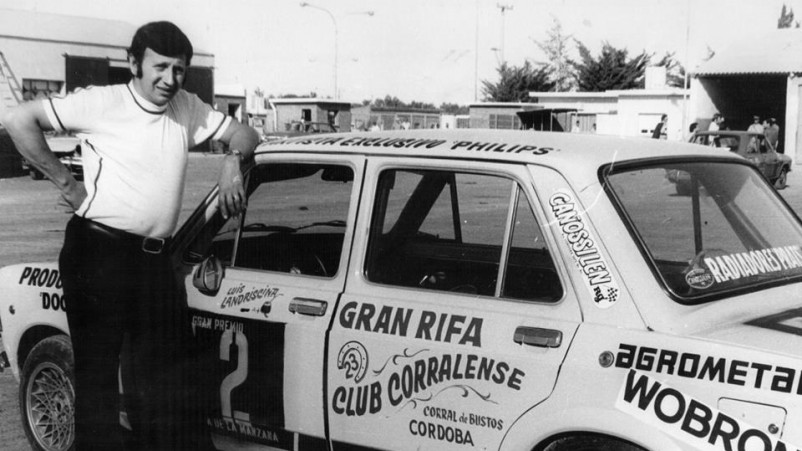
Humorist Luis Landriscina posing with his Fiat 128 IAVA competition car

IAVA's most emblematic model was Fiat 128, which performance cars competed in Rallying and Turismo Carretera with successful results. The IAVA "128 TV" ("Turismo Veloz") was launched in March 1972, with near 500 units built in the first year. This model had a top speed of 170 km/h at 7,000 rpm.

IAVA also made version of the Fiat 147 which was named Sorpasso. They also made versions of the Fiat 133 called IAVA and Fiat 133 Top respectively. Later, IAVA created a buggy called Kikito Buggy but produced less than 25 units, along with 2 berlinetta-type prototypes. It also made a motor for boats based on an SSB structure and a prototype for the firm Mara. Other Fiat models modified by IAVA were the 600, 125, and Duna.

In 1985, Sevel Argentina (which produced Fiat and Peugeot brands in the country since 1980), determined that the subsidiaries should be closed, causing the end of IAVA.

== Production ==
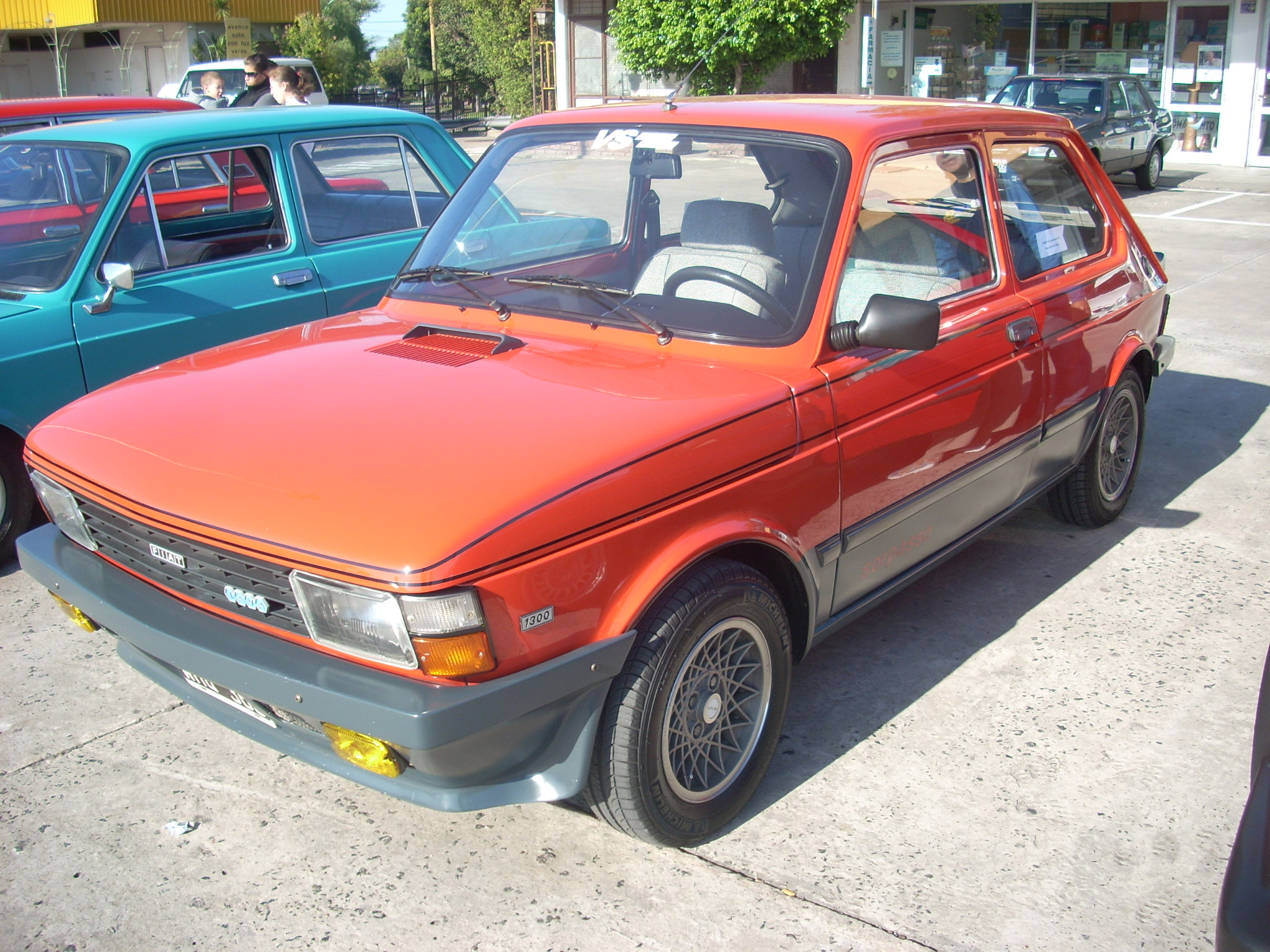
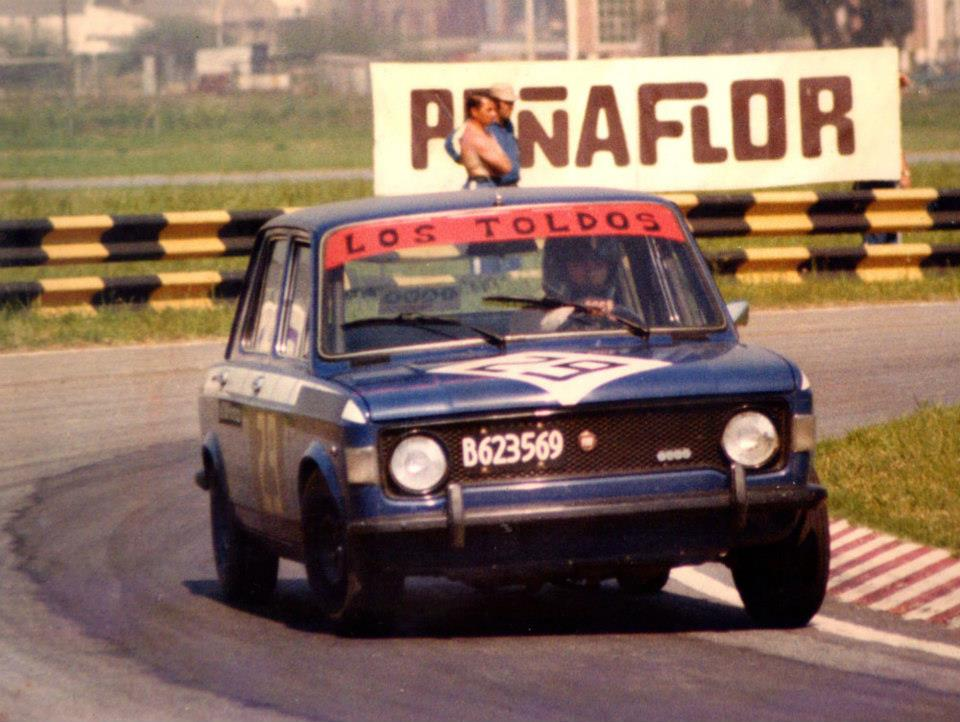
Two IAVA models, Fiat 147 Sorpasso (left), and Fiat 128 in racing competition (right)
- 1971–73 - Fiat 128 IAVA 1100 (71 HP)
- 1974–77 - Fiat 128 IAVA 1300 (88 HP)
- 1977–78 - Fiat 128 Europa IAVA 1100 (88-100)
- 1977–78 - Fiat 128 Europa IAVA 1300 (100 HP)
- 1978–82 - Fiat 128 IAVA TV 1300 (88 & 102 HP)
- 1979–82 - Fiat 133T IAVA 900 (54 HP)
- 1982–83 - Fiat 147 Sorpasso IAVA 1300 (90 HP))
- 1983–84 - Fiat 147 TR5 IAVA 1300 (90 HP)

== Famous owners ==
Some famous personalities of Argentina that owned Fiat IAVA automobiles were Sandro, Daniel Scioli, Ramón Díaz, Carlos Monzón, Marcelo Tinelli, Hugo Gatti, and Guillermo Coppola. Humorist Luis Landriscina not only owned a 128 but he drove his car in a 1974 rally.
