= Fiat Concord =

Argentine subsidiary of Fiat

Fiat SOMECA Concord S.A.C.I

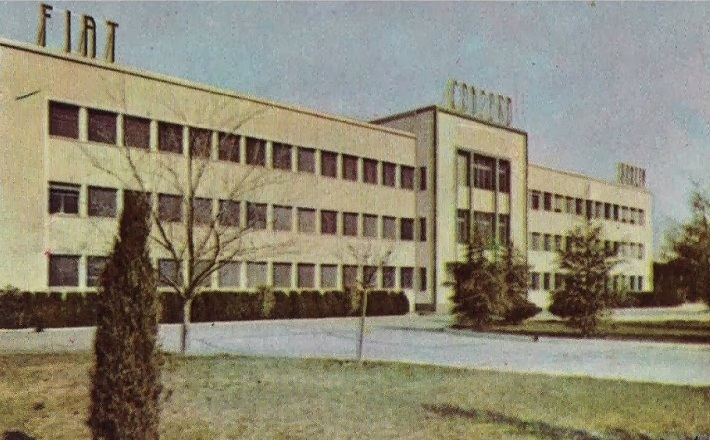
- Fiat Concord factory in Ferreyra, 1962
- Type: Subsidiary
- Industry: Automotive
- Founded: 1954
- Defunct: 1980; 46 years ago
- Successor: Sevel Argentina
- Headquarters: Ferreyra, Córdoba, Argentina
- Area served: Argentina
- Products: Automobiles, trucks, diesel multiple units, rolling stock
- Parent: Fiat S.p.A.
- Subsidiaries: Materfer; IAVA

Fiat SOMECA Concord S.A.C.I (or simply Fiat Concord) was the Argentinan subsidiary of Italian automotive manufacturer Fiat Automobiles S.p.A. and the first manufacturer of Fiat vehicles in the country. Established in 1954, the factory produced not only automobiles but railway vehicles through its subsidiary Materfer. Some of Fiat Concord's most emblematic products included the 600, 128, and the 1500 coupé designed by Vignale.

In railway, Fiat Concord produced diesel multiple units (with the 7131 as its most notable development in the 1960s) and other rolling stock.

== History ==
The first Fiat dealership in Argentina was established in 1919 in Buenos Aires to import Fiat automobiles. Four years later, "Fiat Argentina S.A." was officially established to sell and assist automobiles and trucks imported from Italy.

Initially, Fiat activities in Argentina focused on agriculture, importing tractors through its local subsidiary "Agromecánica S.A.C.I.F." created in 1949. Tractors were imported until 1954, when "Fiat Someca Construcciones Córdoba" (then renamed "Fiat Concord") was established to produce those vehicles in Argentina. In 1959, Fiat of Italy signed an agreement with state-owned Industrias Aeronáuticas y Mecánicas del Estado (IAME) to give technical support. The assembly plant was built that same year in the city of Ferreyra, Córdoba Province, one year later another factory was built to produce diesel engines.

Fiat expanded its operations in Argentina when the company entered to railway market in 1956 after state-owned railway company Ferrocarriles Argentinos granted it concession to provide 300 diesel locomotives and rolling stock. That agreement paved the way for the establishment of Materfer to produce railway vehicles. The plant, also built in Ferreyra, was inaugurated in 1958.

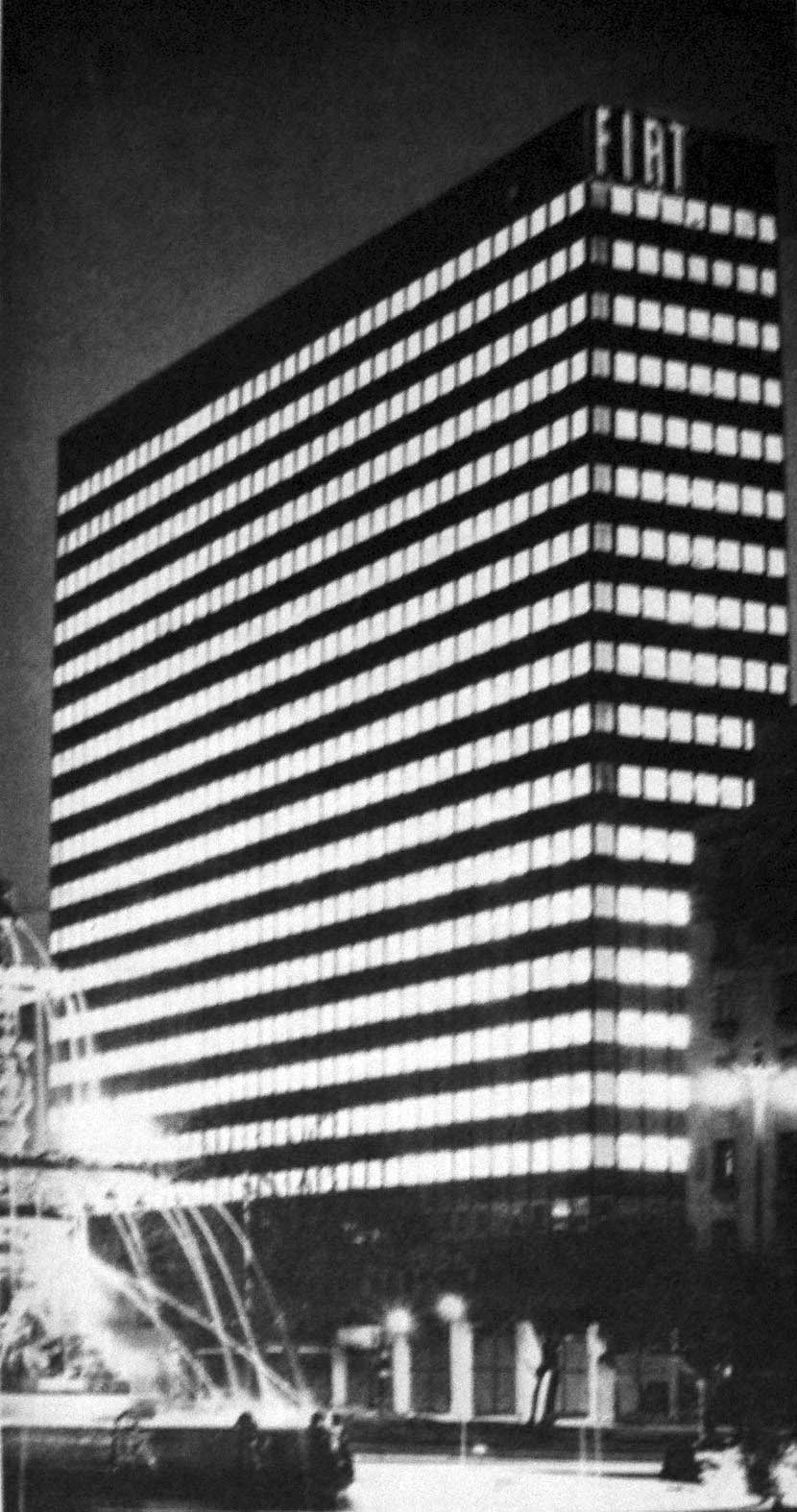
Fiat Concord Building in Buenos Aires, 1966

On 30 September 1959, the Government of Argentina approved a Fiat proposal to invest USD4,5 million to build a factory in Caseros, Buenos Aires. The first locally produced Fiat vehicle, Fiat 600, was launched on 8 April 1960. Soon after, the 1100 was added to the production line. Both models totalised 4,000 units produced at the end of that year.

The 1100 was assembled until 1963, being replaced by the 1500, with a station wagon (familiare) version released one year later. That same year, Fiat Argentina began exporting autoparts to Chile. Fiat Argentina's range of products expanded with the "Multicarga" pickup, 1500 Coupé, and 770 Coupé (being renamed "800" in 1966). In 1966 Fiat Concord launched the 1500 Coupé Vignale, based on the 1500 and designed exclusively for the Argentine market by Italian coachbuilder Alfredo Vignale.

Fiat became leader of the Argentine automotive market with a 23% share in 1967, with more than 40,000 vehicles produced. Two years later production increased to 50,000 units. That same year the 1600 model was launched as a successor of 1500. It was not an original Fiat model but an Italian Fiat 125 body powered by a Fiat 1500 engine. Besides, Fiat Concord launched its first heavy trucks, the 619. In 1969, production of the 1500 was discontinued.

As production increased, in 1971 the factory produced more than 60,000 vehicles per year. Fiat launched one of their most successful and emblematic models, the 128, which added a station wagon model in 1973. The 128 would be produced until 1990. Besides, "Industria Argentina Vehículos de Avanzada" (IAVA S.A.) was established as a Fiat Concord subsidiary to produce performance vehicles. At the time the 128 model ceased to be produced,

The 1600 model was replaced by the 125 in 1972. This model was produced in three versions, sedan, station wagon, and coupé. In 1973, a pickup version (named "Multicarga") was added, being produced until 1980.

In 1977, Fiat Concord launched the 133, a rebadged SEAT 133 (thanks to an agreement between both companies) and marketed in Argentina under license. The car was poorly received, with only 15,821 units produced between 1977 and 1982 being replaced by the 147, a very similar model.

In 1980, Fiat Concord and "Sociedad de Automóviles Franco Argentinos" (SAFRAR), local representative of French brand Peugeot, merged to form Sevel Argentina (officially, "Sociedad Europea de Vehículos para Latinoamérica"), a joint venture that operated as a Latin America subsidiary of European Sevel S.p.A. that had been established in 1978. Entrepreneur Franco Macri would take over Sevel becoming the owner of the company.

== Vehicles produced ==
List of vehicles (automobiles and trucks) produced by Fiat in Argentina, 1960–80:

Name	Type	Orig.	Produced	Image
600	A-segment	ITA	1960–80	
1100	Sedan	ITA	1960–63	
1500	Sedan / Station wagon Pickup	ITA	1963–69	
1500 Vignale (Note: Based on the 1500 and designed by coachbuilder Carrozzeria Alfredo Vignale, this model was marketed exclusively in Argentina.)	Coupe	ARG	1966–70	
619	Truck	ITA	1969–80 (Note: Production continued by Sevel.)	
125 (Note: From 1969–72, it was named "Fiat 1600".)	Sedan / Station wagon Pickup	ITA	1972–80	
128	Sedan / Station wagon	ITA	1971–80	
133	B-segment	SPA	1977–80	

== Railway vehicles ==
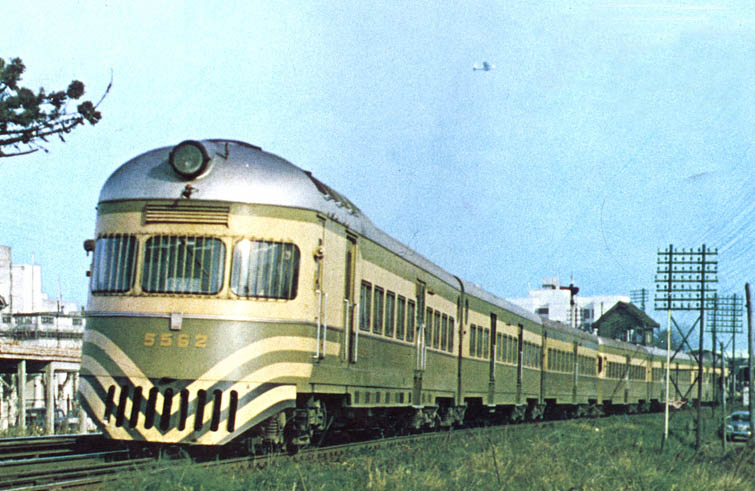
Fiat-Materfer 7131 railcar

In 1962, the first 7131, manufactured by FIAT Concord, made its debut on the Villa Ballester–Zárate and Victoria–Capilla del Señor sections of Mitre Railway. Those light cars replaced Ganz railcars that had been running on those lines since 1938. The 7131 also served in some lines of Santa Fe province.

On the Roca and Sarmiento lines the 7131 replaced old Drewry, Birmingham and Armstrong Whitworth coaches in the Temperley–La Plata–Cañuelas; Haedo–José Mármol, Merlo–Lobos, Pereyra–Ensenada, La Plata–Pipinas–Atalaya–Magdalena; Moreno–Luján–Mercedes, Lobos–Navarro, among other suburban branches. The 7131 also served on Bahía Blanca–Darregueira–Carmen de Patagones; Constitución–TandilNecochea, covering a large area of the south and west of Buenos Aires Province.

== See also ==
- Alstom Ferroviaria (formerly, "Fiat Ferroviaria")
- Sevel Argentina (successor)
