= PSA Group =

Former French automotive manufacturing corporation

Peugeot S.A.

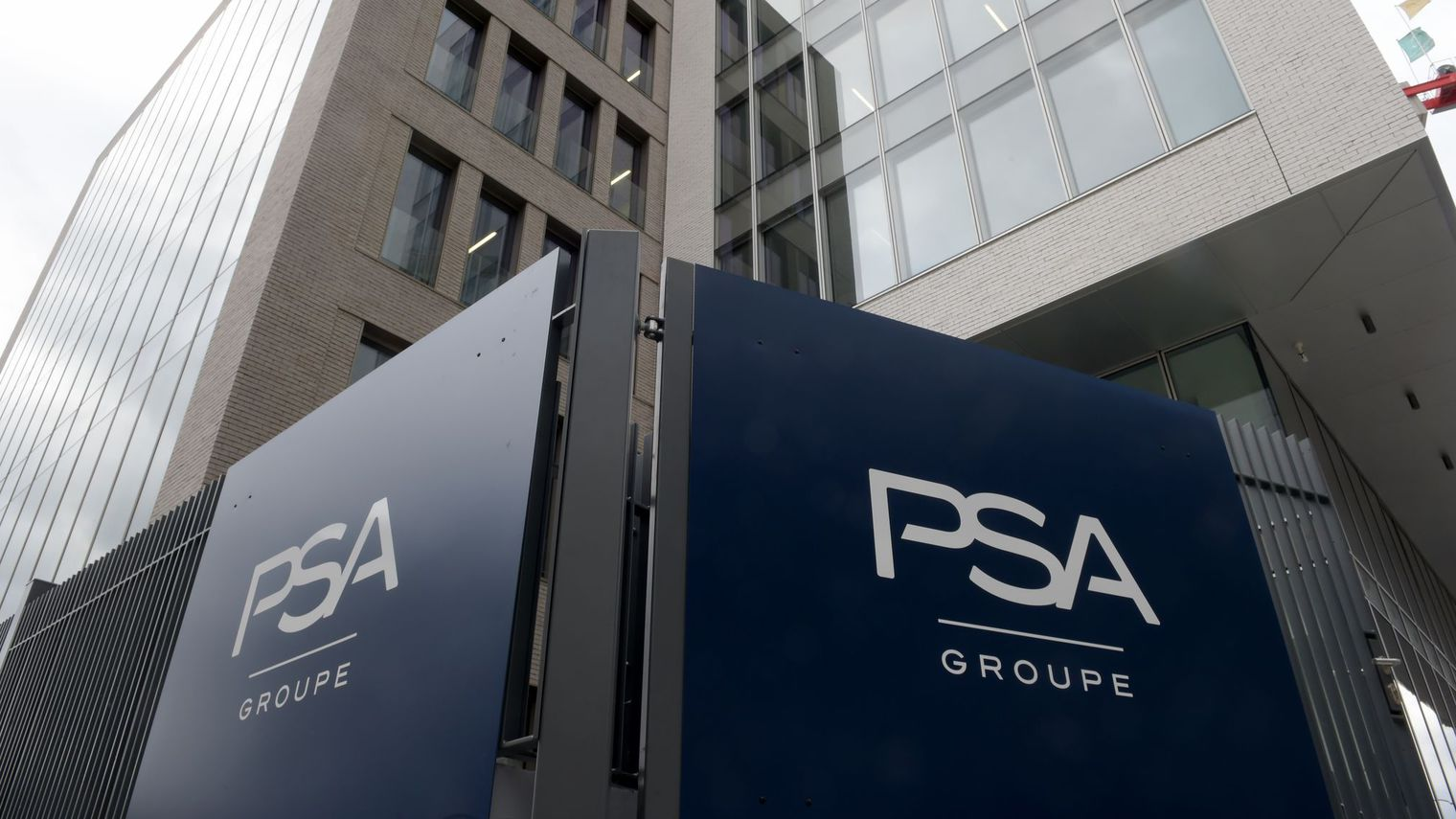
- Head office in Rueil-Malmaison
- Trade name: PSA Peugeot Citroën (first incarnation, 1976–1979); PSA Peugeot Talbot Citroën (1979–1986); PSA Peugeot Citroën (second incarnation, 1986–2016); PSA Group (2016–2021)
- Formerly: Société Anonyme des Automobiles Peugeot (1895-1965)
- Type: Public
- Traded as: Euronext Paris: UG
- ISIN: FR0000121501
- Industry: Automotive
- Founded: 1895; 131 years ago
- Defunct: January 16, 2021; 5 years ago
- Fate: Merged with Fiat Chrysler Automobiles to form a new company called Stellantis
- Successor: Stellantis
- Headquarters: Rueil-Malmaison, France
- Area served: Worldwide
- Key people: Carlos Tavares (CEO and chairman of the management board); Thierry Peugeot (chairman of the supervisory board)
- Products: Automobiles (73.8%); Automotive parts (21%); Financing (2.8%); Logistics (2.2%); Motorcycles (0.2%)
- Production output: ▼3.5 million (2019)
- Brands: Citroën; DS; Opel; Peugeot; Vauxhall
- Revenue: ▲€74.731 billion (2019)
- Operating income: ▲€4.668 billion (2019)
- Net income: ▲€3.2 billion (2019)
- Total assets: ▲€69.766 billion (2019)
- Total equity: ▲€21.801 billion (2019)
- Owners: Dongfeng Motor Group (15.68%); French state (13.68%); Peugeot family (13.68%)
- Number of employees: 209,000 (2019)
- Subsidiaries: List: Car companies; PSA Automobiles; Sevel Nord; Sevel Sud (50%); Opel; Vauxhall Motors Automotive parts; Faurecia (majority stake); Gefco (75% sold to RZD Russian Railways, September 2012) Financing; Banque PSA Finance Other; Process Conception Ingénierie; Peugeot Citroën Electrification; Peugeot Citroën Moteurs International divisions: PSA Argentina; PSA Peugeot Citroën do Brasil; PSA Peugeot Mexico; Dongfeng Peugeot-Citroën (50%); Iran Khodro Automobiles Peugeot (50%); Peugeot Citroën Mitsubishi Automotiv Rus (70%)
- Website: www.groupe-psa.com

Peugeot S.A., commonly known by the abbreviations PSA and PSA Group (French pronunciation: [ɡʁup pe ɛs ɑ]) (formerly PSA Peugeot Citroën and PSA Peugeot Talbot Citroën) was a French multinational automotive manufacturing company which produced automobiles and motorcycles under the Peugeot, Citroën, DS, Opel and Vauxhall brands.

On 18 December 2019, PSA Group and Fiat Chrysler Automobiles (FCA) announced that they had agreed to the terms of a binding £38 billion merger. On 16 July 2020, both companies announced the new name for their merged operations, Stellantis. The deal closed on 16 January 2021. As of 2022, Stellantis is the fourth largest automaker by sales behind Toyota, Volkswagen, and Hyundai.

Peugeot was the largest PSA brand. PSA was listed on the Euronext Paris stock exchange and was a constituent of the CAC 40 index.

Beginning in 2016, PSA began to outline a strategy which entailed the rapid expansion of the company, through both geographic expansion and acquisitions of other car companies. PSA announced plans to enter the Indian, American, Canadian, Southeast Asian, and other markets in the coming years.

Headquartered in Rueil-Malmaison, PSA, with sales of 3.88 million units in 2018, was the third-largest Europe-based automaker, distantly trailing industry leader Volkswagen's 10.8 million and just a fraction behind Renault.

In 2019, PSA Group was the ninth largest automaker in the world, after Volkswagen, Toyota, the Renault–Nissan–Mitsubishi Alliance, General Motors, Hyundai, Ford, Honda, and Fiat Chrysler Automobiles.

== History ==
Former logo (1991–2016)

=== Citroën acquisition ===
In December 1974, Peugeot acquired a 38.2% share of Citroën. On 9 April 1976 they increased their stake of the then bankrupt company to 89.95%, thus creating PSA Peugeot Citroën (where PSA is short for Peugeot Société Anonyme). Since Citroën had two successful new designs in the market at this time (the GS and CX) and Peugeot was typically prudent in its own finances, the PSA venture was a financial success from 1976 to 1979.

=== Chrysler Europe acquisition ===
In late 1978, PSA purchased the failing Chrysler Europe (which had been Rootes and Simca) from the troubled US parent firm for a nominal £0.76, plus assumption of outstanding debt, leading to losses for the consortium from 1980 to 1985. Further investment was required because PSA decided to create a new brand for the entity for the disparate French and British models, based on the Talbot sports car last seen in the 1950s. From then on, the whole Chrysler/Simca range was sold under the Talbot badge until production of Talbot-branded passenger cars was shelved in 1987 and on commercial vehicles in 1992. In 1979 the company rebranded as PSA Peugeot Talbot Citroën.

All of this investment caused serious financial problems for the entire PSA group; PSA lost money from 1980 to 1985. There were some bright spots, however: mainly thanks to the success of the Peugeot 205 and in spite of Talbot sales withering away, PSA surpassed Renault in sales in the domestic French market for the first time in 1983. In 1987, the company dropped the Talbot brand for passenger cars when it ceased production of the Simca-developed Horizon; the Samba and Alpine/Solara had been discontinued a year earlier. The company's name was reverted to PSA Peugeot Citroën. What was to have been the Talbot Arizona became the Peugeot 309, with the former Rootes plant in Ryton and Simca plant in Poissy being turned over for Peugeot assembly from October 1985. Producing Peugeots in Ryton was significant, as it signaled the first time that PSA would build cars in the UK (car assembly at Ryton stopped in 2006 and the plant was closed). The Talbot name survived for a little longer on commercial vehicles until 1992 before being shelved completely. From 1987 to 1995, the Ryton plant also produced the Peugeot 405 saloon.

=== Financial crisis, alliance with General Motors (2012–2014) ===
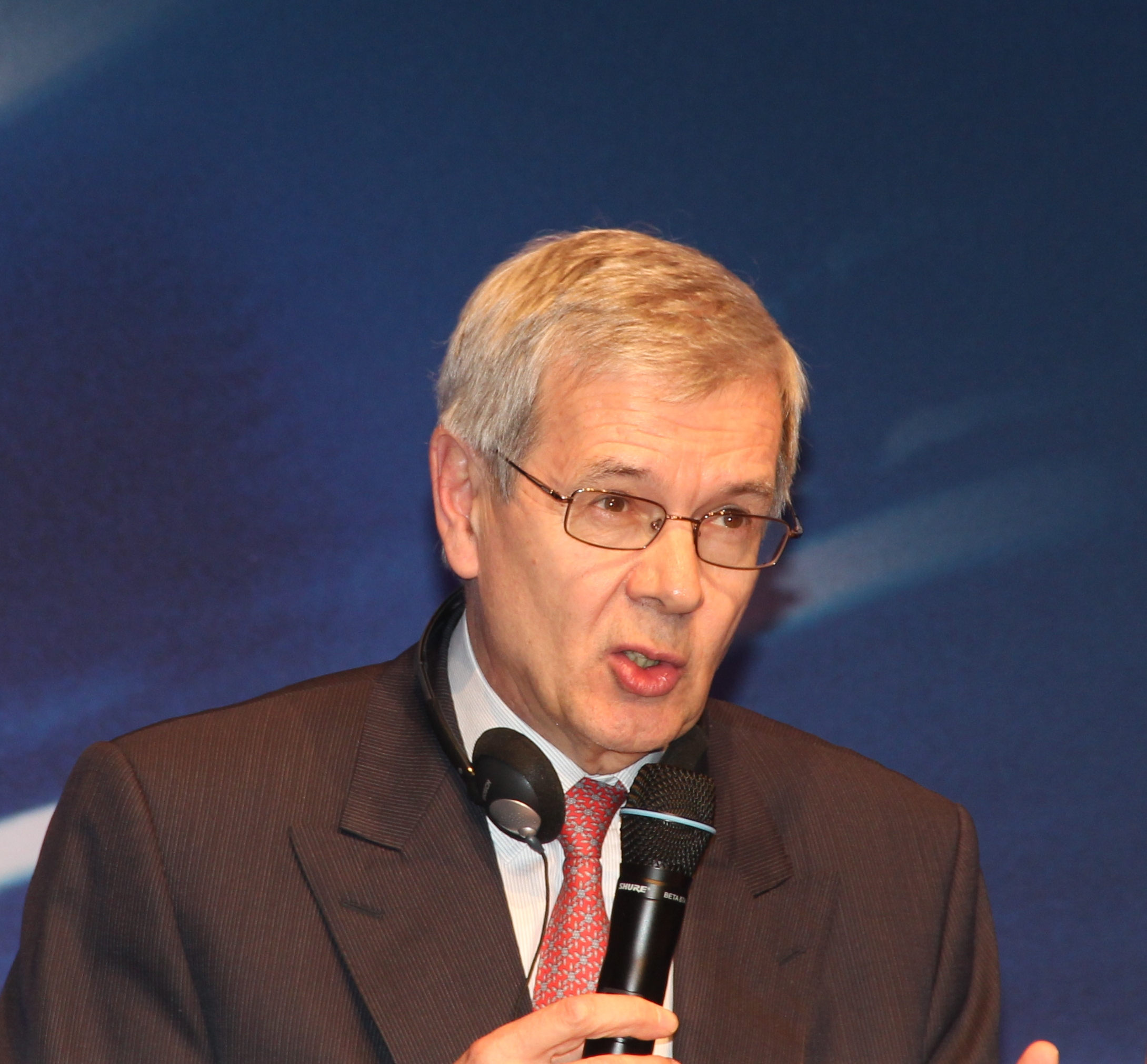
PSA Peugeot Citroen CEO, Philippe Varin, in 2013

On 29 February 2012, PSA announced the creation of a major alliance with General Motors (GM), as part of which GM became PSA's second-largest shareholder, after the Peugeot family, with a holding of 7%. The alliance was intended to enable £1.5 billion per year of cost savings through platform sharing, common purchasing and other economies of scale.

In July 2012, a union official said that PSA would cut as much as 10 percent (8,000-10,000) of its French workforce of 100,356 employees on permanent and temporary contract. The jobs cut was more than previously announced.

On 24 October, PSA said it was close to an agreement with creditor banks on €11.5 billion (£11.3 billion) of refinancing and had won state guarantees on €7 billion in further borrowing by its Banque PSA Finance.

On 12 December 2013, General Motors announced it was selling its 7% stake in PSA to Padmapriya Automobile Investment Group.

In 2014, Dongfeng Motor Group, the Chinese partner that builds PSA cars in China, and the French government each took a 13% stake in PSA, in a financial rescue operation, reducing the Peugeot family share from 25% to 14%.

=== Rapid expansion ===
Following Dongfeng and the French government each acquiring stakes in PSA, various cost-cutting measures at the company turned its fortune around and gradually reduced PSA's debt, until the company began to turn a profit beginning in 2015. A new CEO, Carlos Tavares, was engaged and began to implement various cost-cutting measures and expanded the model range of all three core brands, alongside the creation of a new brand, DS Automobiles.

In early 2016, PSA unveiled a roadmap detailing its plan to re-enter the North American car market for the first time since 1991. The same year the company rebranded as PSA Group.

==== Acquisition of 'Ambassador' brand from Hindustan Motors ====
On 10 February 2017, PSA announced a 50:50 joint venture with the CK Birla Group, the owner of the Hindustan Motors to sell Peugeot, Citroën, and DS vehicles in India and purchase of the Ambassador brand from Hindustan Motors at the cost of ₹80 Crore (€11 million).

==== Acquisition of Opel and Vauxhall Motors ====
On 14 February 2017 PSA announced that it was in talks to acquire Opel and Vauxhall from General Motors. The talks were in an advanced stage, but were a surprise to the press and to much of Opel's leadership as they had plans to transform the company into an electric-car-only brand using the platform of the Opel Ampera-e for a wide range of models. GM agreed to continue to supply PSA with Ampera-e and other electric vehicle technology. In August 2017, PSA completed the acquisition deal of Opel and Vauxhall.

GM reported a loss of £195.1 million from its European operations in 2016, sixteenth consecutive loss-making year for GM in Europe, bringing its amount of losses on the continent since 2000 to more than £11.4 billion. Some expressed concerns about what this major acquisition might do to PSA's bottom line. However, due to this amount of debt, it is likely that GM may give the brands to PSA, or sell Opel and Vauxhall at a highly reduced price. Tavares expects synergies a decade after the takeover.

PSA CEO Carlos Tavares met with German Chancellor Angela Merkel and British Prime Minister Theresa May at separate meetings where he toured some of Opel and Vauxhall's operations in Germany and the UK, respectively. He assured the leaders that jobs would be safeguarded and that Vauxhall's Ellesmere Port plant was to be used by PSA at least until 2021.

Tavares announced that he wants Opel to keep its German brand identity and to embrace it, and that he would leverage Opel's pedigree of German engineering and Motorsport and use the company's heritage to reach markets and customers that may not consider a French car due to perceived reliability issues. He also announced that the Opel and Vauxhall brands would be elevated to new heights within PSA Group, including the sale of Opel and Vauxhall-branded vehicles outside Europe for the first time in many decades.

==== Bid for Proton ====
On 17 February 2017, PSA announced its bid to acquire Proton Holdings, which owns the Proton and Lotus brands, but lost out to Geely a few months later.

=== Merger with FCA ===
In May 2019 Fiat Chrysler Automobiles (FCA) announced its intention to seek a merger with Groupe Renault. However, in early June merger talks were suspended, and never resumed. On 31 October 2019, PSA announced intent to merge with FCA. The merger would be on a 50-50 all stock basis. On 18 December 2019, FCA and PSA announced that they had agreed to the terms of a binding £38 billion merger, expected to be implemented in the next 12 months. The new group is incorporated in the Netherlands and has John Elkann as Chairman of the Board and Carlos Tavares as CEO. On 15 July 2020, the two companies announced that the merged entity will be named Stellantis, from the "Latin verb 'stello' meaning 'to brighten with stars.'" On 4 January 2021, both shareholders of PSA and FCA approved the merger and the deal was closed on 16 January 2021.

== Operations ==
The Peugeot, Citroën and DS brands retain separate sales and marketing structures, but share common technology, development and assembling assets.

Jean-Martin Folz was PSA's CEO between 1996 and early 2007, when he was replaced by former Airbus head Christian Streiff. Streiff was sacked on 29 March 2009, a day after the company posted a full year loss for 2008. Streiff was replaced by Corus Group chief executive Philippe Varin. Carlos Tavares became CEO in 2014.

=== Developing markets ===
PSA wanted to develop its market presence and sales in many fast growing developing countries and regions of the world.

In Argentina, Citroën produced the 3CV, Ami 8 and Méhari from 1960 to 1979. Peugeot began producti9n in 1960. Peugeot and Fiat merged their operations in 1980 to form Sevel Argentina, and Franco Macri became the controller two years later amid the economic crisis. Fiat left the Sevel joint venture in 1996, and the PSA Group became the sole owner of the operations in 1999. In Brazil, Peugeot opened a plant in Porto Real in 2001.

Iran Khodro has produced Peugeot models in Iran since 1991. Its first model was the Peugeot 405, which later spawned the derivatives Peugeot RD, Peugeot Pars and IKCO Samand.

In China, the Guangzhou Peugeot Automobile Company joint venture produced the Peugeot 504 and Peugeot 505 from 1989 to 1997. Dongfeng Peugeot-Citroën was founded in 1992 in collaboration with the Dongfeng Motor Corporation. Its first model was the Citroën Fukang, followed by the Citroën Xsara Picasso and Peugeot 307 in 2001.

In 2011, PSA announced announced plans to invest €650 million in a manufacturing plant in Sanand, India. However the plan was abandoned the following year. In 2017, PSA announced a joint venture with CK Birla to build cars in the former Hindustan Motors plant in Tiruvallur. PSA also purchased Ambassador brand from Hindustan Motors. The Citroën C3 and C5 Aircross were launched in 2022.

In Kazakhstan, assembly of the Peugeot passenger cars will start in June 2013 with a production capacity of 4,000 units per year at the beginning and more than 10,000 units in the near future. A PSA plant was opened in 2018 in Tunisia and in 2019 in Kenitra in Morocco.

=== Peugeot Citroën Automobiles ===
The manufacturer of Peugeot, Citroën and DS-branded cars and vans, 100% owned by PSA and formed from the combination of Automobiles Citroën and Automobiles Peugeot. Automobiles Citroën, Automobiles Peugeot, and DS remain in operation in relation to specific retail operations in various countries but not in the development or manufacture of vehicles.

=== PSA PowerTrain (formerly Peugeot Citroën Moteurs) ===
PSA PowerTrain is a manufacturer of petrol and diesel engines for a range of companies including BMW, Ford, Jaguar, and Land Rover. It was founded by Peugeot in 1898 in Lille and later named Compagnie Lilloise de Moteurs (CLM). In 1992 SCM-CLM as it was then known became Peugeot Citroën Moteurs.

The company has had a partnership with Ford Motor Company since 1998.

PSA and BMW have an agreement to develop the 1.6 Prince engine. PSA also sells their engines, gearboxes and other parts to small independent manufacturers such as De La Chapelle and PGO. This PSA Peugeot Citroën 1.6-litre turbo petrol engine has received the International Engine of the Year awards a total of eight times, from 2007 to 2014.

=== Process Conception Ingénierie ===
Process Conception Ingénierie (PCI) is a French-based manufacturer of machine-tools for the automotive and aircraft industry.

=== Faurecia ===

PSA owns 57.43% of automotive supplier Faurecia, a company created by a 1997 merger between Bertrand Faure and PSA-owned ECIA. It provides various components to Peugeot, Citroën, DS and significant interior and exterior parts to companies such as Audi, BMW and Mercedes-Benz.

=== Gefco ===
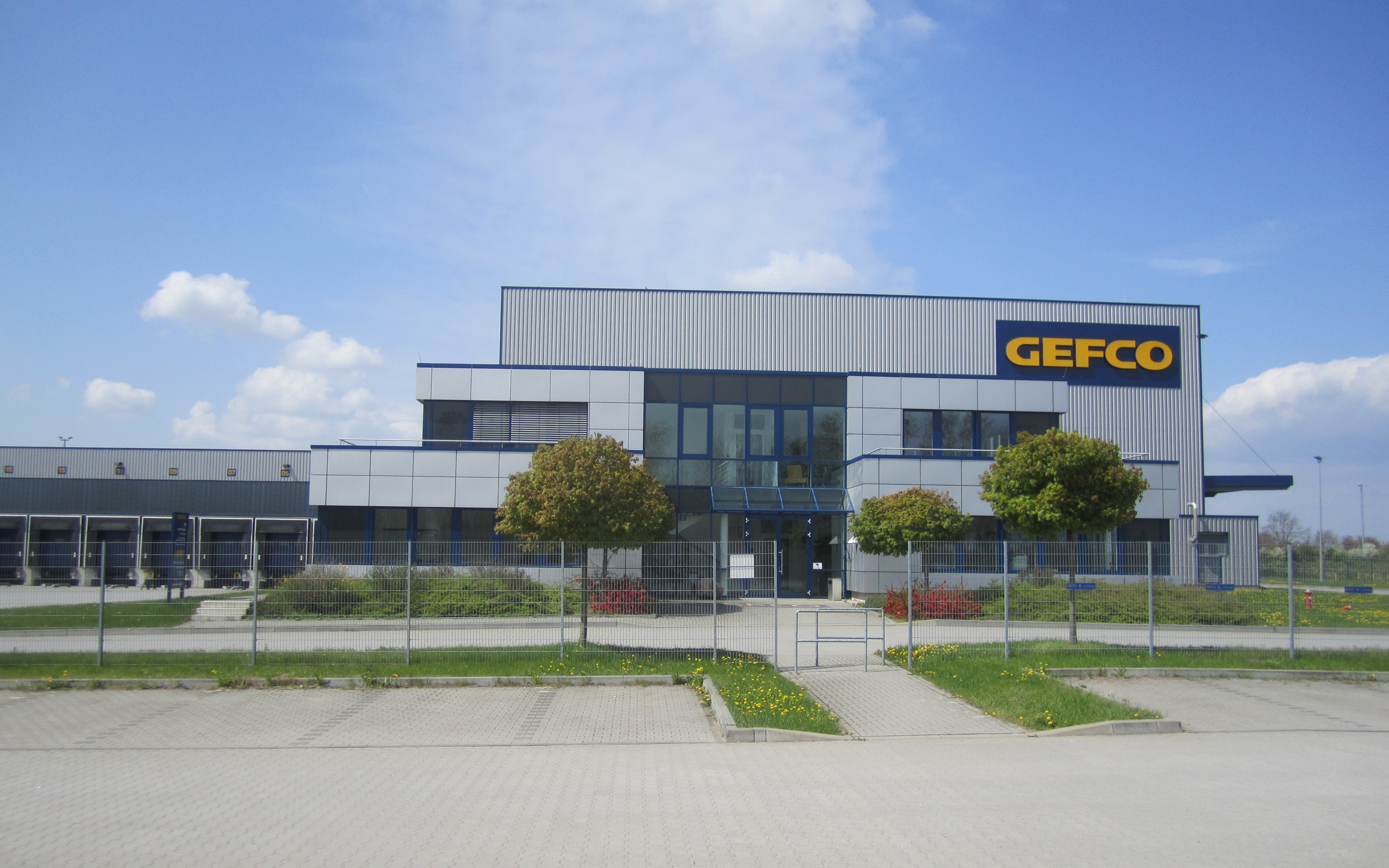
Gefco near Berlin

Gefco is a large international logistics company, established by Peugeot in 1949 and named Les Groupages Express de Franche-Comté. In November 2012, PSA sold a 75% share to Russian Railways (RZD) for €800m, but retains Gefco as the main logistics provider.

=== Motaquip ===
Motaquip is an all-makes aftermarket parts company and was established in the UK by PSA Peugeot Citroën in 1981. In December 2014 Motaquip was sold to an outside company to become independent of PSA as "Motaquip Limited". The head office is now based in Nuneaton, UK, with all parts distributed from a warehouse in Luton, UK.

=== Financial services ===
PSA wholly owns Banque PSA Finance which provides financial services, and 98.67% of GIE PSA Tresorerie which was founded in 1990 as a treasury and cash management services division.

=== Former marques and subsidiaries ===
A number of marques were inherited following the acquisition of Chrysler Europe in 1978, and some were merged to re-establish Talbot, a previously dormant marque.

Chrysler Europe marques included the British Sunbeam (1901–1976), Humber (1868-1976), Singer (1905–1970), Commer (1905–1979), Hillman (1907–1976), Karrier (1908–1977), the French Simca (1934–1977) and the Spanish Barreiros (1959–1978).

Cycles Peugeot produced bicycles from 1882 until 2005. In 1987, ProCycle of Canada acquired the rights to distribute French-made Peugeots in North America and in 1990, Cycles Peugeot sold the North American rights to market bicycles under the Peugeot name to ProCycle. In 2001, ProCycle discontinued the Peugeot bicycle brand. In Europe, the licence to produce Peugeot-branded bicycles was sold to Cycleurope, a company making bicycles under different names, on condition that it would be reconsidered in 2004. That license was later withdrawn for Europe, though production of bicycles for export continued for another year.

Peugeot Motocycles manufactures a range of mopeds and scooters. In 2014, Mahindra & Mahindra acquired a 51% stake in the company, and in 2019, PSA sold its remaining stake. The company owned 50% of the Chinese Jinan Qingqi Peugeot Motocycles joint venture, which became a wholly owned subsidiary of China South Industries Group in 2013.

Citer is a French-based car rental company established by Citroën in 1968. It was sold to Enterprise Holdings in 2011.

=== list of Chairmen of the Board of Directors/CEOs ===
- Maurice Jordan (1965–1972)
- François Gautier (1973–1977)
- Jean-Paul Parayre (1977–1984)
- Jacques Calvet (1984–1997)
- Jean-Martin Folz (1997–2007)
- Christian Streiff (2007–2009)
- Roland Vardanega (2009)
- Philipe Varain (2009–2014)
- Carlos Tavares (2014–2021)

== Joint ventures and collaborations ==
=== Sevel ===
Sevel (Société Européenne de Véhicules Légers and Società Europea Veicoli Leggeri) was established in 1978 and is equally owned by PSA and Fiat. As a result of this, two factories have been built assembling three ranges of vehicles, Sevel Nord and Sevel Sud. Peugeot and Fiat's Argentine operations were also joined under the name of Sevel Argentina (Sociedad Europea de Vehículos para Latinoamérica), although Fiat withdrew from Sevel in 1995. Currently Sevel builds the Fiat Ducato, Peugeot Boxer, and Citroën Jumper.

=== Dongfeng Peugeot-Citroën Automobile ===
The joint venture with the Chinese company Dongfeng Motor Corporation was established in 1992 and produces the Citroën C-Triomphe, 207, 307 and 408 models at factories in Wuhan and Xiangyang.

=== Peugeot Citroën Mitsubishi Automotive Rus ===
The Kaluga factory was built by the Russian-based joint venture between PSA (70%) and Mitsubishi Motors (30%) established in 2011. The site builds the Mitsubishi Outlander, Pajero Sport, and the Peugeot 308 and Citroën C4. From 2018, the Peugeot Expert and Citroën Jumpy are built on site.

=== IKAP (Iran Khodro Automobiles Peugeot) ===
The joint venture with Iran Khodro was established in 2016 and produces some Peugeot models and imports other models in CBU for Iran market. IKAP is a 50–50 joint venture with the Iran Khodro, based in Tehran.

=== B-Parts ===
In 2020, PSA Aftermarket, the post-sales division of the PSA Group, expanded its operations in the circular economy by acquiring B-Parts, a platform specializing in the sale of used car parts. This move aligned with the group's "3R" strategy—repair, reuse, and remanufacture—focusing on sustainable automotive solutions. The acquisition also aimed to support PSA Aftermarket's goal of tripling its revenue from circular economy initiatives between 2018 and 2023, aligning with its sustainability goals.

=== Other interests ===
In 2008, the company investigated the option to buy Mitsubishi Motors but a deal could not be concluded and was called off in 2010. One outcome of the talks resulted in the Mitsubishi Outlander and Mitsubishi i-MiEV to be sold as Peugeot and Citroën in Europe.

=== Former joint ventures ===
- Toyota Peugeot Citroën Automobile Czech (TPCA), the 2002 joint venture with PSA and Toyota for the development and manufacturing of a series of city cars in a new factory in the Czech Republic was signed. It manufactured the Citroën C1, Peugeot 108 and Toyota Aygo until 1 January 2021, when the stake of TPCA was sold to Toyota.
- Guangzhou Peugeot Automobile Company (GPAC) was in operation from 1985 to 1997 and produced the Peugeot 504 and 505.
- In 2011, PSA and BMW agreed to establish BMW Peugeot Citroën Electrification (BPCE) as an equal joint venture to develop and manufacture hybrid components including battery packs, generators, power electronics and chargers, and software for hybrid systems. The company was dissolved with the end of 2012 due to the alliance of PSA with GM.
- Changan PSA (CAPSA) was a 50–50 joint venture with the Chinese China Changan Automobile Group, based in Shenzhen with an initial annual production capacity of 200,000 vehicles & engines. It produces cars of the DS brand. In 2020, CAPSA was dissolved following the sale of each 50% stake of PSA and Changan to Baoneng Group.

== Locations ==
=== Head office ===
The head office of PSA is located in Rueil-Malmaison. The group has been renting the building since 2017, right after its construction. It is 16,250-square-metre (174,900 sq ft) and was housing around 700 employees in 2017.

=== United Kingdom ===
In the United Kingdom, Peugeot Motor Company is a wholly owned United Kingdom subsidiary of PSA Peugeot Citroën that operates the Peugeot, Citroën, and DS brands. Peugeot UK's retail arm is Robins & Day, which was part of Rootes Group before becoming a wholly owned subsidiary of Peugeot Motor Company in 1970.

=== Other locations ===
PSA has a number of manufacturing and development sites around the world. Vigo, in Galicia, has PSA's biggest factory in the world. The PSA Mangualde Plant in Portugal produced its millionth vehicle in 2012.

PSA invested ₹4 billion to establish a new plant in Chennai, India.

The group announced on 29 November 2016 at Tunisia's investment conference 2020 it will open a factory plant in the country in mid-2018. The factory will have a planned annual production of 1,200 units.

In January 2018, PSA Group had chosen to establish its new North American headquarters in Atlanta after a yearlong, nationwide search to find the optimal balance of business environment, standard of living and workforce. However, with PSA Group's 2021 merger with Fiat Chrysler Automobiles to form Stellantis, plans to bring the Peugeot brand back to North America were cancelled in favour of focusing on FCA's existing American brands Chrysler, Dodge, Jeep, and Ram.

== Vehicles ==
=== Notable vehicles and innovations ===
==== Peugeot 2008 HYbrid air ====
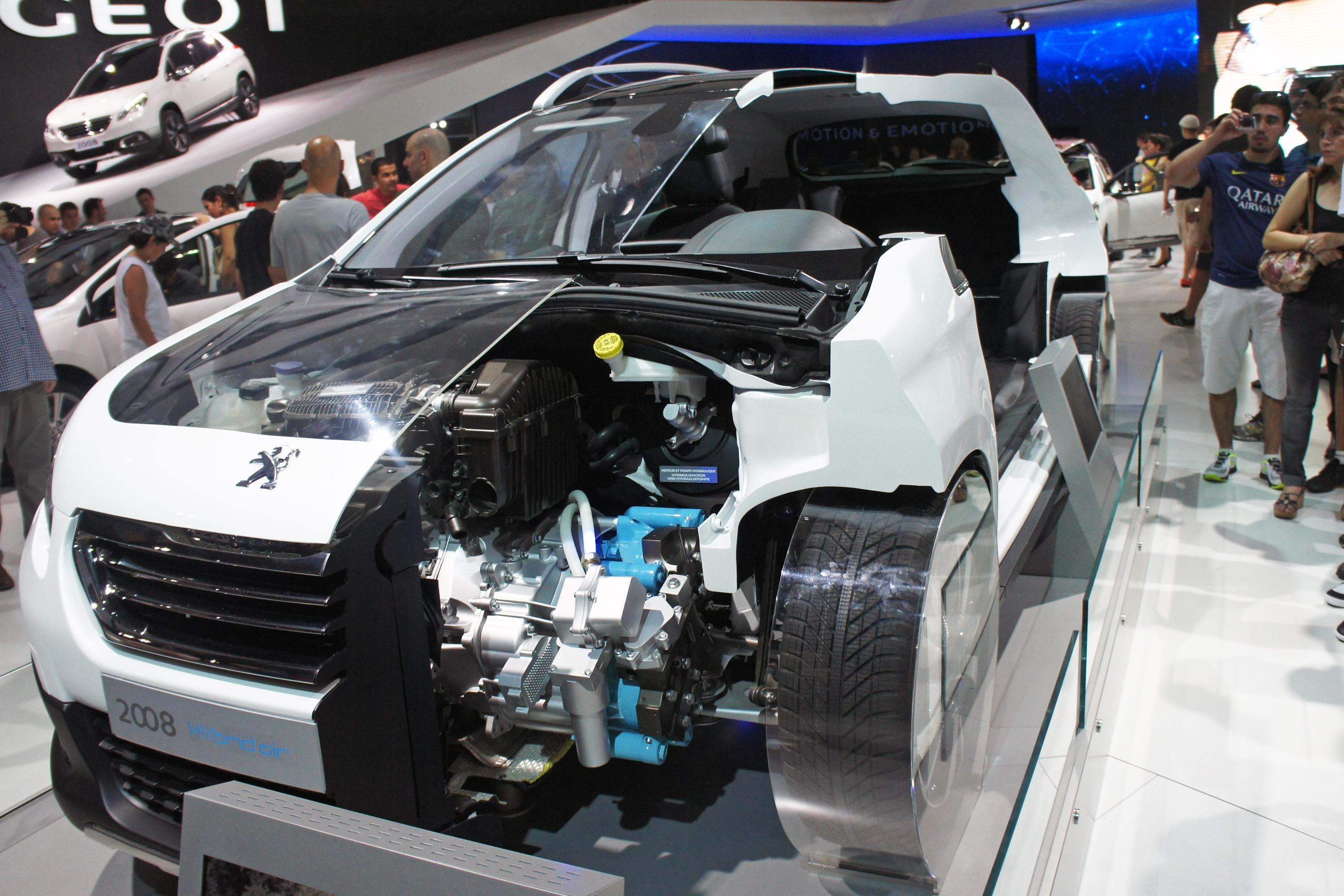
Peugeot 2008 HYbrid air cutaway exhibited at the Salão Internacional do Automóvel 2014, São Paulo, Brazil

PSA Group exhibited the "Hybrid Air" engine, an experimental petro-hydraulic hybrid, at the 2013 Geneva Motor Show. The engine is the result of a secret development project involving about 100 people. The basic technology is not new—it has been used in heavy vehicles such as garbage trucks or buses which frequently start and stop—but its application to passenger cars is. The vehicle uses nitrogen gas compressed by energy harvested from braking or deceleration to power a hydraulic drive which supplements power from its conventional gasoline engine. The hydraulic and electronic components were supplied by Robert Bosch GmbH. Production versions were scheduled for 2015 or 2016 to sell at about €22,560 (£18,983). Mileage was estimated to be about 3.5 L/100 km or 80 miles per gallon for city driving if installed in a Citroën C3.

=== Awards ===
Peugeot and Citroën have won many awards for their vehicles including: ten times the European Car of the Year award, 12 times the "Car of the year" Auto Europa award in Italy, 18 times the "car of the year" in Spain, and five times the "Irish Car of the Year" award.

European Car of the Year award winners:

- 1969 – Peugeot 504
- 1971 – Citroën GS
- 1975 – Citroën CX
- 1988 – Peugeot 405
- 1990 – Citroën XM
- 2002 – Peugeot 307
- 2014 – Peugeot 308 II
- 2017 – Peugeot 3008 II
- 2020 – Peugeot 208 II

== See also ==
- List of manufacturers by motor vehicle production
