= Peugeot 408 =

Automotive nameplate by Peugeot

The Peugeot 408 is an automobile nameplate used by the French automobile manufacturer for two different C-segment car models:

- Peugeot 408 (saloon), a C-segment saloon car mainly marketed in China, Southeast Asia and Latin America since 2010 across three generations
- Peugeot 408 (crossover), a C-segment crossover introduced in 2022 marketed in Europe and in China as the 408 X
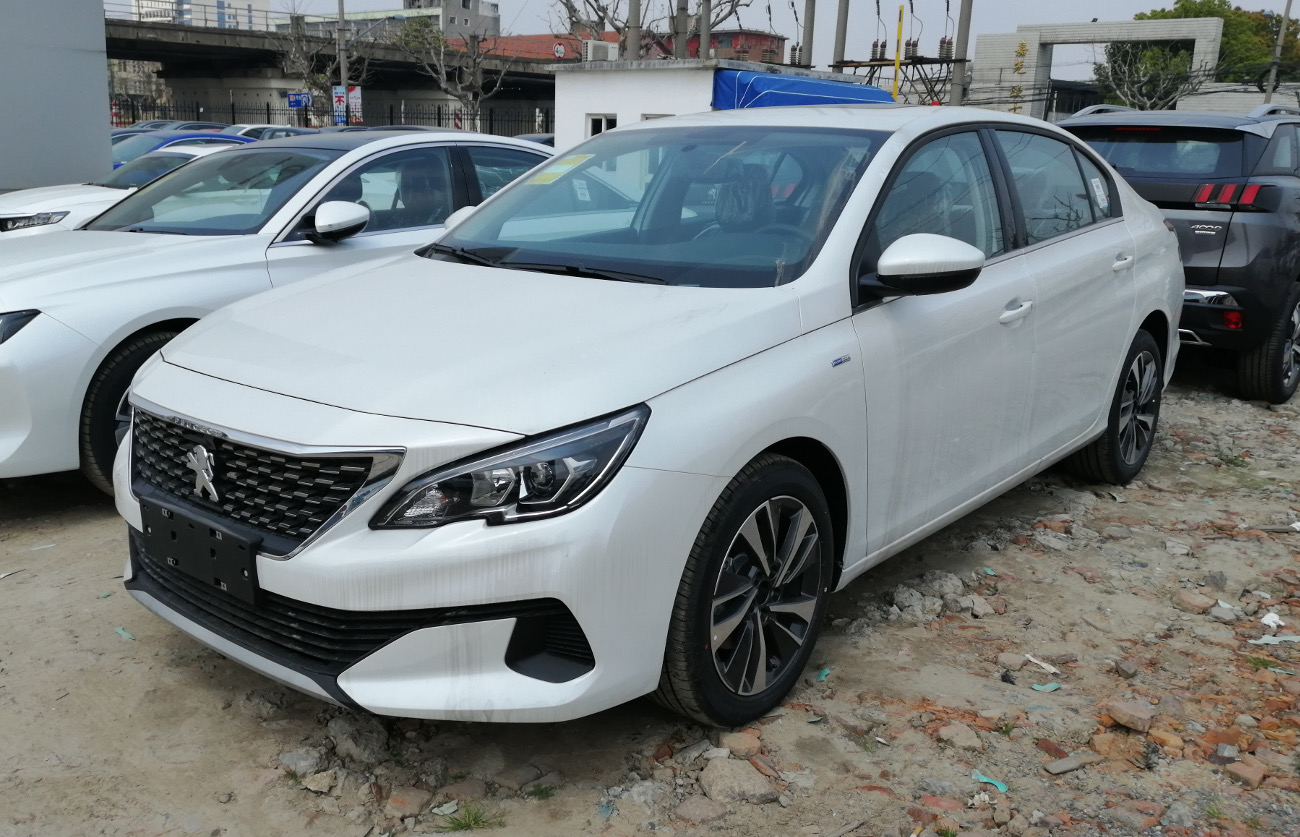
Peugeot 408 saloon (second generation, China)

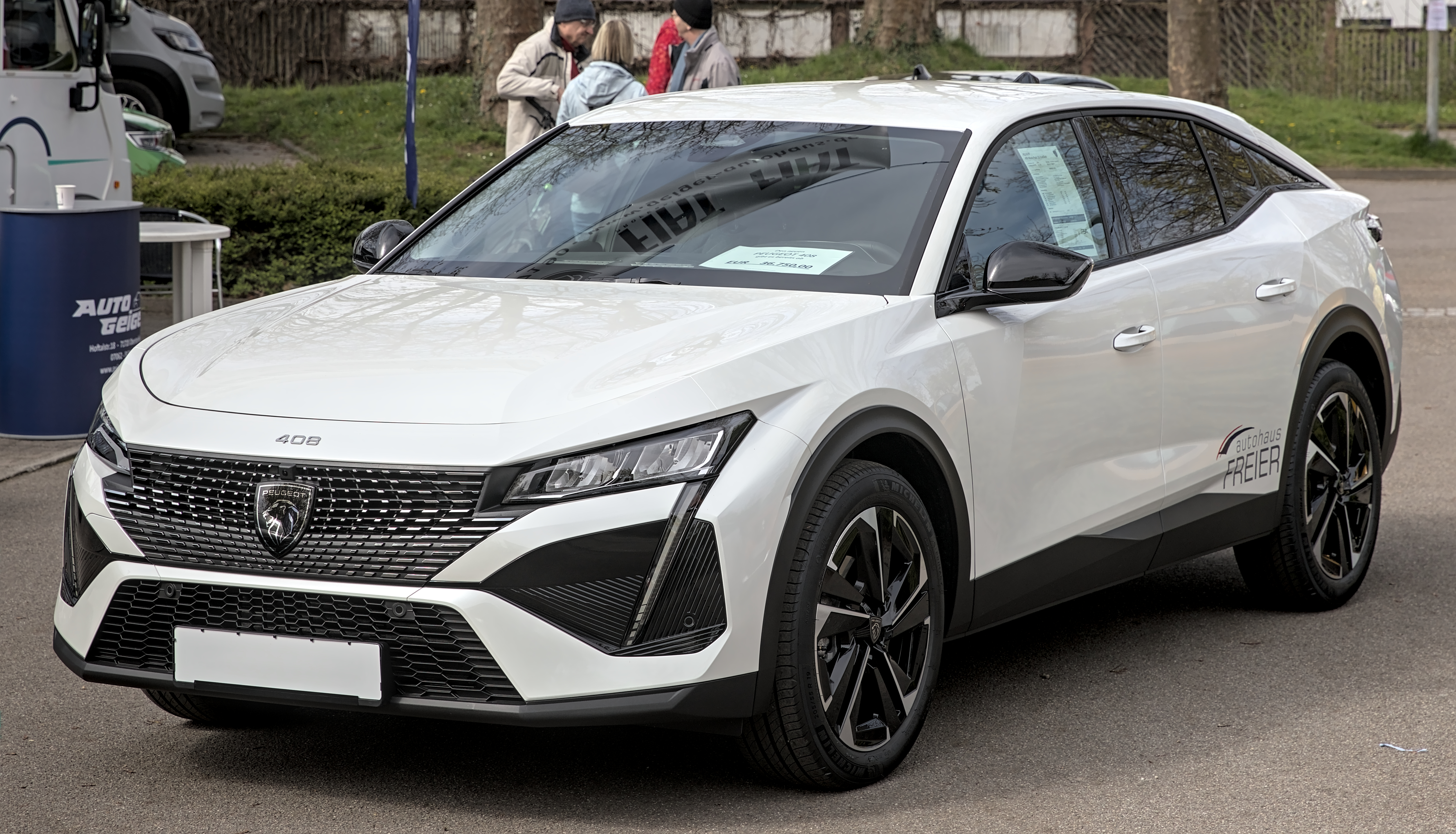
Peugeot 408 crossover (Europe)
