= Franco Macri =

Italian-Argentine contractor, developer and industrialist (1931-2019)

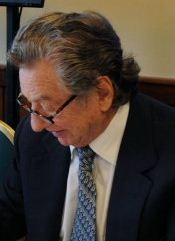
- Born: 15 April 1931; Rome, Kingdom of Italy
- Died: 2 March 2019 (aged 87); Buenos Aires, Argentina
- Occupations: Contractor; developer; industrialist
- Years active: 1951–2019
- Spouse(s): Alicia Blanco Villegas (1958–1981); Cristina Cressier (1981–1986)
- Children: 6, including Mauricio

Francesco Raùl Macri (15 April 1931 – 2 March 2019) was an Italian-Argentine contractor, developer, industrialist and father of former Argentine President Mauricio Macri.

== Life and career ==
=== Childhood in Italy ===
Macri was born in Rome, to Giorgio Macri and Lea Garbini. His mother belonged to a prosperous local family, proprietors of an intercity bus service and supporters of Fascist dictator Benito Mussolini.

His father was born to a family of fallen nobility from the Calabria region. Opponents of il Duce, their kinship to the powerful Pellicano clan allowed them to retain a small postal service carrier in the area around San Giorgio Morgeto. The eight-year-old Franco and his two younger siblings were sent to a military school in 1938, following their parents' divorce two years earlier, a common fate for the children of divorced couples under Italian Fascism. They were reunited with their father in Genoa five years later.

=== Arrival in Argentina ===
The birth of the Italian Republic prompted Giorgio Macri to enter politics, by which he co-founded a nationalist party, the Common Man's Front, ahead of the general elections in June 1946; following the party's poor showing, however, he departed for Buenos Aires, settling in the western suburb of San Justo. He immigrated with two of his seven siblings- Antonio (the father of Jorge Macri) and Maria Pia (who married Antonio Calcaterra). He later obtained housing in the Eva Perón Foundation's Ciudad Evita community, and was joined by his three children in January 1949. Franco Macri found work in as a construction laborer; he was promoted quickly and held an administrative post within a year, later earning his secondary school diploma at the Colegio Nacional de Buenos Aires and, in 1950, establishing a construction firm, Urbana.

Obtaining a number of small, public contracts, Urbana ultimately failed, and Macri entered into a partnership, Vimac, in 1953. The firm was boosted by a lucrative contract from Loma Negra, the leading Argentine cement producer, for the construction of a new plant near Tandil in 1955. He married Alicia Blanco Villegas, the daughter of a prominent Tandil physician, in 1958, relocated to Mar del Plata, and had the first of their four children, Mauricio, in 1959.

=== Leading contractor ===
Macri started a home builder, Demaco, and purchased a tiny Buenos Aires apartment facing Vicente López Plaza (in the heart of the upscale Recoleta district). The 1962 installation of ultraconservative Economy Minister Alvaro Alsogaray, however, and the latter's policy of paying state contractors and employees with worthless "Ninth of July Bonds" led to Vimac's closure.

Joined by two investors and aided by an economic recovery, in 1964 he fused Demaco with the remains of Vimac to establish Impresit-Sideco. The firm secured a coveted contract with Italian automaker Fiat, for the construction and maintenance of their Caseros factory, and quickly became a leading public works contractor, notably in the construction of the General Belgrano Bridge, the Atucha I and Embalse nuclear power plants (Latin America's first), as well as in private works, such as an Agip gas pipeline and the Catalinas Norte office park.

Inheriting his father's interest in film (the elder Macri had worked for the iconic Cinecittà Studios), he also established MBC, which produced cinema for local directors Leopoldo Torre Nilsson and Alejandro Doria, among others.

Having completed over 30 major public works projects worth over US$1.8 billion since 1964, Macri acquired Philco and NEC's Argentine affiliates and gained controlling interest in Impresit and established Socma, a holding company for his various interests, in 1976. The installation of the last dictatorship that year, and their appointment of Buenos Aires Mayor Osvaldo Cacciatore led to the closure of the city's tens of thousands of apartment building incinerators, whose noxious disposal of the city's 3,000 daily tons of refuse had been worsening air quality for decades. Cacciatore had them replaced in 1979 with curbside pickup service awarded to Manliba, a consortium between Impresit-Sideco and Waste Management, Inc.

Macri's marriage ended in separation in 1980 (no provision existed in Argentina for divorce until 1987), and in 1982 he married Cristina Cressier, with whom he had his sixth child, Florencia. The collapse of the Argentine auto industry in 1981–82 allowed Macri to purchase a controlling stake in Sevel Argentina, a local joint venture between Fiat and Peugeot formed in 1980. The acquisition averted the closure of the European automakers' Argentine plants, and tripled Socma's income.

Macri's finances were undermined, however, from losses stemming from the Banco de Italia y Río de la Plata, of which he was majority shareholder between 1975 and 1980. The subsequent crisis, which resulted from the implosion of Economy Minister José Alfredo Martínez de Hoz's financial deregulation and strong peso policies, also prompted Macri to take advantage of an exchange rate guarantee enacted by the Central Bank in 1980 for large private borrowers facing sharply higher U.S. dollar payments, a benefit granted to Sevel.

=== Ventures and misadventures ===
Macri entered into a valuable real estate venture in New York, when in 1979, developer Abraham Hirschfeld sold him a 75% stake in 30 hectares (75 acres) of Hudson Riverfront land formerly owned by Penn Central. Planning to develop "Lincoln West," a residential complex, Macri agreed to invest US$100 million in mandated public works and related expenses, but could not find development financing. Ultimately, he sold the land to Donald Trump in 1985 for US$117 million, by transferring a unserviced Chase Manhattan loan to Trump. The aforementioned disappointment was compounded by a heart attack in 1983, and the end of his second marriage in 1986, by which he lost custody of Florencia. He suffered serious losses during the country's repeated currency crises between 1987–90, but gained from a partnership with BellSouth and Motorola to form Movicom, the first large-scale Argentine mobile phone service provider.

A supporter of La Rioja Province Governor Carlos Menem ahead of his upset victory in the 1988 Justicialist Party primaries, Macri broke from the flamboyant president when, after his 1989 election (which he won on a populist platform), he pursued aggressive free trade policies that undermined Sevel (by then the largest automaker in Argentina) in favor of cheaper imports. Carlos Grosso, Menem's appointed Mayor of Buenos Aires (a presidential prerogative until 1996), was a managerial employee of Macri's. A vocal Peronist, Grosso had reportedly been spared becoming one of the "disappeared" upon his 1978 military abduction only by Macri's appeal on his behalf to Internal Affairs Minister Albano Harguindeguy and Apostolic Nuncio Pio Laghi. The family was shaken by 23 August 1991, kidnapping of Mauricio Macri, Franco Macri's eldest son. Freed after two weeks in captivity for a reported ransom of US$6 million, Macri's abduction was executed by four members of the Policía Federal Argentina, which has policing purview over Buenos Aires (the perpetrators were located only a decade later).

Sevel, the Socma Group's centerpiece at the time, initially benefitted from the boom touched off by Economy Minister Domingo Cavallo's Convertibility Plan in 1991, seeing its auto sales grow from 30,000 in 1990 to 200,000 in 1994. The local auto industry was hit hard, however, by the Mexican peso crisis. A fall in sales to 130,000 led the company to divest itself of the Fiat licence in 1996, and Sevel revenues fell by nearly half, to US$1.1 billion. During the Menem-era wholesale privatization drive, Macri was outmaneuvered in a 1997 bid for the management of the nation's 33 main airports by Eduardo Eurnekian, although Socma was sold the national postal service in July 1997.

Sevel was eventually liquidated, rescinding its Peugeot licence in March 2000, well into the 1998–2002 Argentine great depression, and the Socma Group's global revenues fell from US$4.5 billion in 1994 to US$2 billion in 2001. Following Sevel's liquidation, Macri was convicted of customs duty evasion relating to an auto export-import scheme via neighboring Uruguay.

=== Legacy ===
Macri, a fan of the Boca Juniors football club since the 1950s, had a commercial relationship with it for almost as long, dating from his 1960 partnership in a small insurance firm with the club's president at the time, Alberto Armando. He leveraged this to promote his elder son, Mauricio, as president of the club in 1992, though he was defeated by the incumbent, Antonio Alegre (credited with saving the club from insolvency in the 1980s). Macri was elected in 1995, however, and caused controversy by earmarking a multi-million dollar renovation of the Bombonera stadium, and granting the contract to Impresit (Macri's construction firm).

Florencia, Macri's youngest daughter, was kidnapped on 30 April 2003, and freed a week later after a ransom of nearly a million dollars was reportedly paid. The federal postal service contract with Socma, through Correos Argentinos, was rescinded, citing the company's debt to taxpayers of US$296 million. Pago Fácil, the electronic funds transfer service operated by Socma, became one of the group's leading firms, processing over 7 million payments a month. Among the group's most significant real estate developments after 2004 was the Mulieris Towers, in Buenos Aires' Puerto Madero district.

Macri returned to the auto industry in 2007, when he obtained licensing to produce Chery automobiles, as well as their parts, which would be assembled in Uruguay. His son, Mauricio, was elected Mayor of Buenos Aires in 2007, and in 2008, the 78-year-old Macri divested Socma of two of its most important firms, Iecsa (construction) and Creaurban (real estate), in favor of Angelo Calcaterra, his nephew. Chery Socma, the joint venture with the Chinese automaker, exported its first units in September 2009.

Macri published a reflection on his over half-century as an Argentine businessman, El futuro es posible, in 2004. From 1949 when he arrived in Argentina Macri kept the suitcase with which he came.

== Panama Papers scandal ==
In April 2016, following the leak to German newspaper Süddeutsche Zeitung of 11 million documents belonging to Panamanian law firm Mossack Fonseca, the leaked Panama Papers revealed that Mauricio Macri was listed as director of a Bahamas-based trading company that he did not disclose during his tenure as Mayor of Buenos Aires. Shortly after the Panama Papers made the news, Mauricio appeared in a short television interview in which he said his father, Franco Macri, had founded the company through a "legal operation". He added that the company had been intended to carry out investment operations in Brazil but the business was never completed.

Journalist Joaquín Morales Solá considered it unlikely that Mauricio would be prosecuted for the Panama revelations. Mauricio appears himself in the directory, Franco Macri had reported it to the AFIP, and it was closed in 2008, just a year after Mauricio Macri became chief of government.

On 7 April 2016, federal prosecutor Federico Delgado began a formal investigation into Macri's involvement with Fleg Trading Ltd., the company registered in Panama for which President Macri was listed as director. Judge Sebastián Casanello was asked to start the file on the inquiry. The initial petition was made by Norman Martínez, deputy for the Front for Victory. Martínez claimed Macri could be guilty of perjury due to omissions made in his sworn statement. Martínez also referenced another offshore company, Kagemusha SA, which had been established in 1981 and to which President Macri also had connections.

== Death ==
Macri died on 2 March 2019, in his house in Barrio Parque. Most Argentine politicians sent their condolences to Mauricio Macri, including (despite their rivalry) former president Cristina Fernández de Kirchner. He also received messages from other South American presidents, such as Brazilian Jair Bolsonaro, Bolivian Evo Morales, Paraguayan Mario Abdo Benítez, Peruvian Martín Vizcarra and the U.S. ambassador Edward Prado.

He was buried at the cemetery Jardín de Paz in Pilar. The Macri family arrived from San Martín de los Andes following a private funeral.
