= Fiat 619 =

Multi-purpose truck

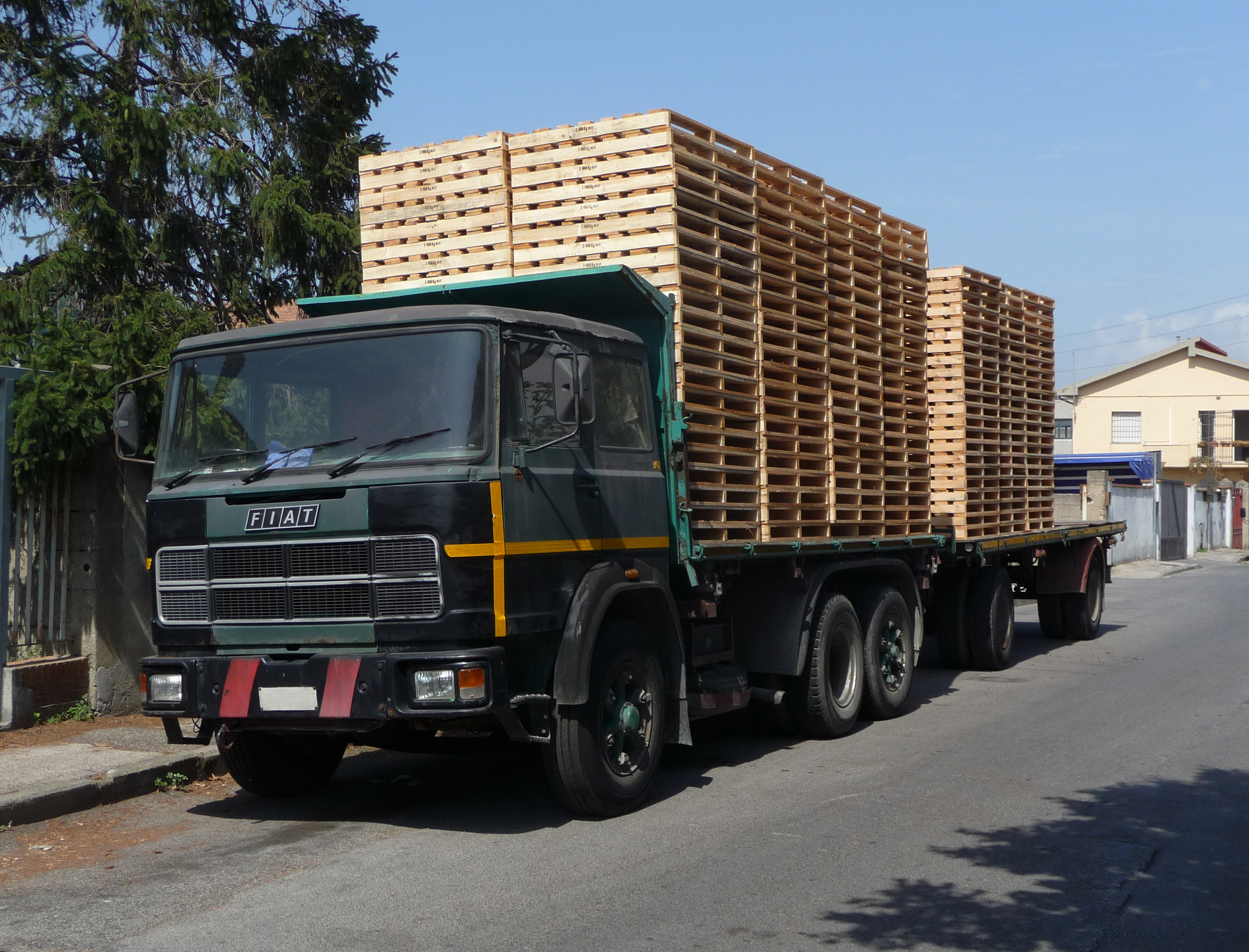
- Fiat 619N1 second generation

Overview
- Type: Truck
- Manufacturer: Fiat Veicoli Commerciali
- Production: 1964–1980

Dimensions
- Length: 5,860–7,900 mm (230.7–311.0 in)
- Width: 2,411–2,590 mm (94.9–102.0 in)
- Height: 2,799 mm (110.2 in); 1,480 mm (58.3 in) (estate)
- Curb weight: 9,500–16,000 kg (20,944–35,274 lb)

Chronology
- Predecessor: Fiat 682; Unic Cargo (France)
- Successor: Iveco T-series

The Fiat 619 is a multi-purpose truck, tractor for Semi-trailer trucks, manufactured from 1964 to 1980 and part of the Fiat V.I. family of heavy vehicles. The truck was intended to replace the Fiat 682 in production since 1952, but the manufacturing of the latter continued until 1984, also thanks to the demands of the African market.

== Different versions ==
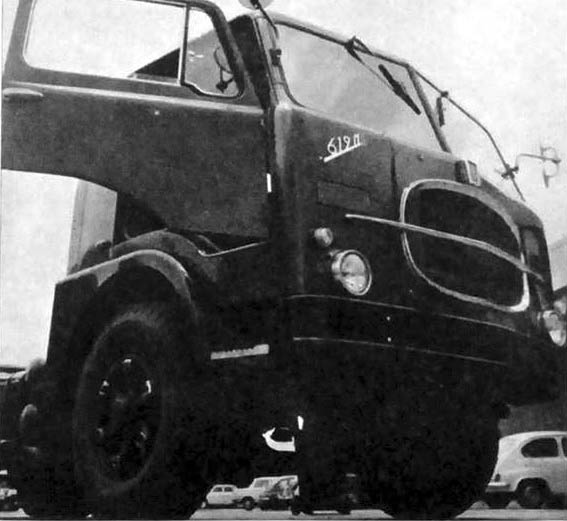
1969 Fiat 619

The first generation included two versions: the Fiat 619 N, as a chassis truck, and the Fiat 619 T, as a road tractor. At that time the letters after the number indicated "naphtha" for the N and "tractor and semi-trailer" for the T. Both were equipped with the characteristic Fiat baffo cabin with the characteristic moustache (baffo in Italian) on the front. The Fiat baffo cabin would become the emblem of Fiat VI trucks from 1955 to 1974 and was designed to comply with the new Italian Highway Code of 1952, that imposed new rules on the sizes of Vehicles, in accordance with the Geneva Convention (1949) on international transport. In South America, where it was produced until 1994, the Fiat 619 was nicknamed pico de loro, that is parrot beak, due to the shape of the cabin.

The second generation was launched (Fiat 619 N1 and Fiat 619 T1) from 1970 and was equipped with the more spacious Fiat H cabin, which was then kept until 1991. Initially equipped with an engine of 12,883 cubic centimeters and 210 horsepower, with the N1 and T1 versions it changed to a propulsion unit of 13,798 cubic centimeters and 260 horsepower.

The two vehicles, built in advance of the European Code which stipulated 19 Tonnes as mass limits for two-axle vehicles and 26 tonnes for three-axle vehicles, were quite popular in Northern Europe. This preferential position of foreign markets ended up defining the Fiat 619 as the export truck.

The 619 T1 was equipped with a diesel engine type 221, straight-six engine, with a power of 208 and a displacement of 12883 cc. All combined with a Fiat 4 +4 gearbox. The maximum speed was 95 km/h.

The range was also marketed as a Unic in France and as a Magirus-Deutz in Germany.
