= Sevel Argentina =

Company

Sevel Argentina S.A.
- Type: Subsidiary
- Industry: Automotive
- Predecessor: Fiat Concord; SAFRAR Peugeot
- Founded: 1981; 45 years ago
- Founder: Jean Paul Parayre & Umberto Agnelli
- Defunct: 1999; 27 years ago
- Successor: Fiat Auto Argentina; Peugeot-Citroën Argentina
- Headquarters: El Palomar, Buenos Aires, Argentina
- Key people: Franco Macri; Mauricio Macri (president, 1994–95)
- Products: Automobiles, pickups
- Brands: Fiat; Peugeot; Chevrolet (1985–91); List: (Imported); Alfa Romeo; Citroën
- Parent: Sevel

Sevel Argentina S.A. was an Argentine automobile company established in 1981 that produced and marketed Fiat, Peugeot, Alfa Romeo, Chevrolet, and Citroën vehicles for the local market until it was dissolved in 1999. The company was created by merging Fiat's and Peugeot's Argentine operations (Fiat Concord and SAFRAR).

Entrepreneur Franco Macri had a controlling stake in Sevel, which would become as the largest automaker in Argentina. Franco's son and former president of Argentina, Mauricio Macri, was in charge of Sevel (first as vice-president and then as president of the company) in the early 1990s.

== History ==
In Europe, Fiat S.p.A. and PSA Peugeot Citroën began a 50/50 joint venture in 1978 under the name of "Sevel" (an acronym of "Société Européenne de Véhicules Légers" or "Società Europea Veicoli Leggeri"). Two factories, Sevel Sud in Italy and Sevel Nord in France, still produce commercials and MPVs.

The Argentine manufacturers of Peugeots (SAFRAR, Sociedad Anónima Franco Argentina de Automotores CIF) and Fiats (Fiat Concord S.A.) then merged in 1981. The merger was in response to law No Nº 21.932 of 1979, ordering the restructuring of the Argentine automotive industry. The new company formed was also called Sevel, but here the versatile acronym stood for "Sociedad Europea de Vehículos para Latinoamérica" (European Company for making Vehicles for Latin America). At first, Sevel resumed production of models previously made by Fiat Concord (125, 128) and SAFRAR (404, 504) but the company soon added new models such as Peugeot 505 (1981), and Fiat 147 (1982).

Italian immigrant to Argentina and entrepreneur Franco Macri, who had been associated with Fiat in construction business, took over Sevel operations in 1982 through its Grupo SOCMA, after acquiring the 85% share. The company proposed to reduce production of automobiles to 30,000 per year, which caused the closure of two out of five assembly plants in Argentina, and the suspension of 15,000 employees. In the second half of the 1980s, Fiats Regatta (spelled with two t's in South America except for Venezuela), Uno, Duna were added, as well as the Chevrolet C-10 pickup produced under license from General Motors.

As part of the rationalization effort, production of passenger vehicles was to take place in Fiat's large El Palomar plant, while commercials, tractors, vans, and heavy vehicles were to be built in Fiat's factory in Ferreyra, Córdoba province. Peugeot's Berazategui (in Greater Buenos Aires) factory was decommissioned and production transferred to El Palomar, but increasing market demand in 1993 meant this plant was reopened.

The opening of imports in 1991 allowed Sevel to market in Argentina Alfa Romeo and Citroën vehicles. In 1992, Mauricio Macri was appointed as vice-president of the company, then being president from 1994 to 1995 before becoming a football executive as president of Boca Juniors in 1996.

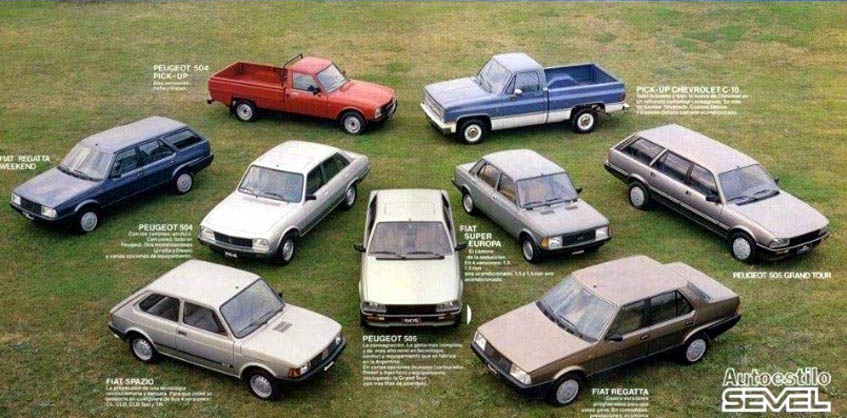
Sevel's complete line of vehicles in a 1985 ad

Sevel, the Socma Group's centerpiece at the time, initially benefitted from the boom touched off by Economy Minister Domingo Cavallo's Convertibility Plan in 1991, seeing its auto sales grow from 30,000 in 1990 to 200,000 in 1994. The local auto industry was hit hard, however, by the Mexican peso crisis. A fall in sales to 130,000 led the company to divest itself of the Fiat licence in 1996, and Sevel revenues fell by nearly half, to US$1.1 billion.

The Argentine economic crisis that began in 1994 affected the automotive production among other sectors. In 1996 Sevel Argentina separated from Fiat S.p.A. As Fiat's Argentine operations gradually became autonomous, Sevel moved their entire production to their El Palomar plant. In 1998, Grupo SOCMA sold its block of shares to PSA Group which took over production of Peugeot and Citroën vehicles under the name of "Peugeot-Citroën de Argentina".

Sevel was eventually liquidated, rescinding its Peugeot licence in March 2000, well into the 1998–2002 Argentine great depression, and the Socma Group's global revenues fell from US$4.5 billion in 1994 to US$2 billion in 2001. Following Sevel's liquidation, Macri was convicted of customs duty evasion relating to an auto export-import scheme via neighboring Uruguay.

== Sevel Uruguay ==
"Sevel Uruguay", located in its capital city Montevideo, is an assembler of Fiat, Jeep, Chrysler, Dodge, and Ram branded vehicles. The company was founded in 1984 and since 1992 it has assembled vehicles as CKD-related kits. The vehicle identification number, however, uses the plant's own brand code 9U1.

Fiat models that have been assembled in Uruguay are Uno, Fiorino, Punto, Palio (sedan and station wagon), Siena, Strada, Stilo, Idea, Linea, Ducato, and Iveco Daily. Some of the vehicles assembled in Uruguay are also marketed in Central America.

== Vehicles ==
In 1981, production of the existing lineups (Fiat 600, 133, 128, 125, Peugeot 404, and 504) continued, but newer models were announced along with the merger. Subsequently, the Fiat 147 (called Spazio) and Peugeot 505 were added, while other old models were either updated or discontinued. SEVEL-built cars received "8A4" as the manufacturer code in the vehicle identification number.

=== Produced ===
List of vehicles (automobiles and trucks) produced by Sevel Argentina, 1981–1999:

Fiat
| Name | Type | Orig. | Produced | Image |
| 600 | A-segment | ITA | 1981–82 (Note: Resumed production previously initiated by Fiat Concord.) | |
| 125 | Sedan / Station wagon / Pickup | ITA | 1981–82 | |
| 128 | Sedan / Station wagon | ITA | 1981–82 | |
| 133 | B-segment | SPA | 1981–82 | |
| 619 | Truck | ITA | 1981–95 | |
| 147 | hatchback compact | BRA | 1982–96 | |
| Regatta | Sedan / Station wagon (Note: Named "Weekend".) | ITA | 1985–95 | |
| Duna | Sedan / Station wagon | ITA | 1987–95 | |
| Uno | B-segment | ITA | 1989–95 | |
| Fiorino | Light commercial | ITA | 1990–95 | |

Peugeot
| Name | Type | Orig. | Produced | Image |
| 404 | Sedan | FRA | 1981–81 | |
| 504 | Sedan / Pickup (Note: Produced 1990–95.) | FRA | 1981–99 | |
| 505 | D-segment / Station wagon (Note: Named "Break".) | FRA | 1981–95 | |
| 405 | D-segment | FRA | 1992–99 | |
| 306 | C-segment | FRA | 1995–99 | |
| 206 | B-segment | FRA | 1999 | |
| Partner (Note: Sold under both PSA Group brands, Peugeot ("Partner") and Citroën ("Berlingo").) | Panel van | FRA | 1999 | |
Chevrolet
| Name | Type | Orig. | Produced | Image |
| Chevrolet C-10 (Note: Under license of General Motors.) | Pickup | USA | 1985–91 | |

=== Imported ===
- Fiat Tempra (1993–?)

== See also ==
- AutoLatina, similar joint venture in Argentina and Brazil
