= C88 =

C88 may refer to:

- Ruy Lopez chess openings ECO code
- Immunoproliferative disorders ICD-10 code
- Employment Service Convention, 1948 code
- Porsche C88 prototype car for the Chinese market, 1994
- Caldwell 88 (NGC 5823), an open cluster in the constellations Circinus and Lupus
- Form C88, a European Union customs declaration form
- An early version of the programming language standard ANSI C

== See also ==
- C8 (disambiguation)
