= Eurovan =

Eurovan may refer to:

- The Volkswagen Transporter (T4), marketed in North America as the Eurovan from 1992 to 2003.
- Eurovans, a nickname for passenger vans produced at Sevel including the Citroën C8, Fiat Ulysse, Lancia Phedra, and Peugeot 807.
