= C8 =

C8, C08, C.VIII or C-8 may refer to:

== Transportation ==
=== Aviation ===
- AEG C.VIII, a World War I German armed reconnaissance aircraft
- AGO C.VIII, a World War I German reconnaissance aircraft
- Cierva C.8, a 1926 Spanish experimental autogyro
- De Havilland Canada C-8 Buffalo, a military transport aircraft of the 1960s
- Fairchild C-8, a military transport aircraft of the 1930s
- Fokker C.VIII, a 1928 Dutch reconnaissance aircraft
- Chicago Express Airlines (defunct) IATA code

=== Automotive ===
- Citroën C8, a brand of minivan
- Sauber C8, a 1985 racing car
- Spyker C8, a sportscar produced by car manufacturer Spyker Cars
- Eighth generation Chevrolet Corvette (C8)

=== Nautical ===
- HMS C8, a 1907 C-class submarine of the Royal Navy
- USS Raleigh (C-8), an 1892 protected cruiser of the United States Navy

=== Rail ===
- LSWR C8 class, a London and South Western Railway locomotive class
- C-8 (Cercanías Madrid)
- LNER Class C8, a class of 2 4-cylinder compound locomotives

=== Spaceflight ===
- Saturn C-8, the largest Saturn rocket to be designed

== Biology, medicine and chemistry ==
- Code C08 Calcium channel blockers, in ATC (Anatomical Therapeutic Chemical Classification System)
- C08, Malignant neoplasm of other and unspecified major salivary glands ICD-10 code
- C8 complex, three proteins involved in the complement system (part of the immune system)
- Cervical spinal nerve 8 in human anatomy
- Carbon-8 (C-8 or ^{8}C), an isotope of carbon
- An octyl-type hydrocarbon with eight carbon atoms like in a C8 bonded silica stationary phase column, a type of column used in reversed-phase chromatography
- Perfluorooctanoic acid (PFOA, known colloquially as C8), a ubiquitous chemical used in the production of PTFE

== Arts and entertainment ==
- Eighth octave C, a musical note, the highest on a piano
- Castle Infinity, the first graphical massively multiplayer online game
- C8 (French TV channel), a defunct French TV channel
- C8 (Eastern Europe), TV channel

== Other uses ==
- Caldwell 8 (NGC 559), an open cluster in Cassiopeia
- Celestron, 8-inch (200 mm) a Schmidt-Cassegrain telescope
- C8 carbine, an assault rifle used by Canada and other NATO forces made by Diemaco/Colt Canada
- C8 Unemployment Indemnity (Shipwreck) Convention, 1920
- Elbrus-8C, a Russian 28 Nanometre 8 core microprocessor
- An international standard paper size (57×81 mm), defined in ISO 216

== See also ==
- 8C (disambiguation)
