= 8C =

8C or VIII-C may refer to:

- Alfa Romeo 8C and the unrelated Alfa Romeo 8C Competizione
- Maserati 8C, a 1932 Grand Prix race car
- Stalag VIII-C, a World War II German POW camp near Sagan
- Carbon-8 (^{8}C), an isotope of carbon
- Air Transport International, IATA code
- Eighth Cambridge Survey of Radio Sources (8C)
- Shanxi Airlines, IATA code
- Cotai Water Jet, IATA code

== See also ==
- C8 (disambiguation)
