= Sevel =

Italian company

SEVEL S.p.A.
- Formerly: Società Europea Veicoli Leggeri; Société Européenne de Véhicules Légers
- Company type: Joint venture
- Industry: Automotive
- Founded: 1978; 48 years ago
- Founders: FIAT S.p.A. PSA Group
- Defunct: 2022 due to Stellantis Group
- Successors: Stellantis Pro One
- Headquarters: Atessa, Italy
- Area served: EMEA; LATAM
- Products: Light commercial vehicles
- Parent: FIAT / PSA (1978–2021); Stellantis (2021–present)
- Subsidiaries: SEVEL Nord; SEVEL Sud

SEVEL S.p.A. (acronym of "Società Europea Veicoli Leggeri" – "Société Européenne de Véhicules Légers" (European Light Vehicle Company) was an Italian automotive company which produces light commercial vehicles. It was first established in 1978 by FIAT S.p.A. and PSA Group. Formerly, Alfa Romeo, Lancia and Talbot were also part of the joint venture. SEVEL Sud in Italy began manufacturing in 1981. SEVEL Nord in France started in 1993. FIAT sold its share of SEVEL Nord to PSA in 2012 and re-entered it through the merger of FCA and PSA into Stellantis in 2021. A joint venture extension for SEVEL Sud was agreed upon by both automakers in February 2019, preceding the merger of both companies into Stellantis..

== SEVEL Nord ==
SEVEL Nord (from "Société Européenne de Véhicules Légers") is a car factory in Lieu-Saint-Amand, near Valenciennes, Denain and Cambrai, France, with manufacturing commencing in 1993. It was founded as a 50–50 joint venture between Groupe PSA (then named PSA Peugeot Citroën) and FIAT Group S.p.A.. SEVEL Nord started manufacturing vans for Toyota in 2013. A third generation of light commercial vans and passenger minivans was launched by PSA and FIAT in 2016.

It has a production capacity of 200,000 vehicles per year, and a total of 2,400 employees. In 2011 some 94,000 vans were manufactured, 74,000 of which were Peugeot and Citroën and 20,000 were FIAT models.

SEVEL Nord has produced:

- Minivans/MPVs nicknamed Eurovans (1994–2014): Citroën Synergie/Evasion/C8, FIAT Ulysse, Lancia Zeta/Phedra, Peugeot 806/807.
- Third generation minivans (2016–present)
  - Citroën Space Tourer
  - FIAT Ulysse
  - Peugeot Traveller
  - Toyota ProAce Verso
  - Opel Zafira Life/ Vauxhall Vivaro Life
- Light commercial vehicles
  - Citroën Jumpy/Dispatch
  - FIAT Scudo (1994–2015, 2022–present)
  - Peugeot Expert
  - Toyota ProAce (2013–present)
  - Opel Vivaro/ Vauxhall Vivaro
  - IVECO eJolly (2025–present)

== SEVEL Sud ==
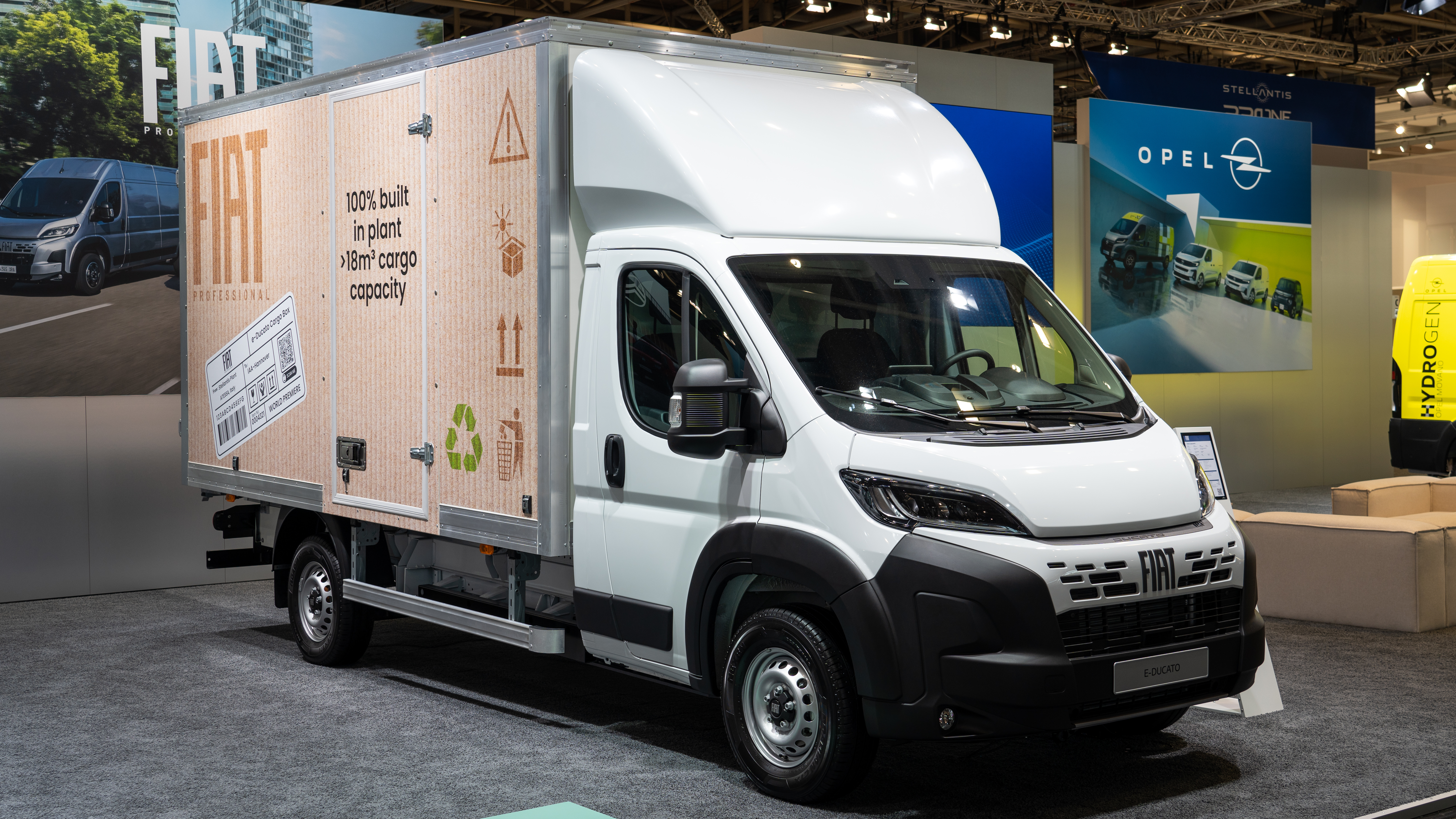
FIAT E-Ducato III (IAA Transportation 2024)

=== SEVEL Atessa ===
The SEVEL Sud (from Società Europea Veicoli Leggeri") is a car factory in Atessa, Italy. The complex is owned by Stellantis. The factory began manufacturing in 1981.

It occupies an area of more than 1.2 million square meters, of which 344,000 are covered. It has a production capacity of 250,000 vehicles per year, with a total of 6,300 workers employed. In 2013, FIAT and PSA announced their new investment for a new generation van, with a €550 million/€150 million split in investment, with the joint venture continuing through their merger company Stellantis. The facelifted third generation model was launched in 2014.

In September 2018 the 6 millionth vehicle (a FIAT Ducato) was built in the SEVEL Atessa factory.

- First generation (1981–1994)
  - FIAT Ducato I
  - Alfa Romeo AR6
  - Peugeot J5
  - Citroën C25
  - Talbot Express
- Second generation (1993–2006)
  - FIAT Ducato II
  - Peugeot Boxer/Manager
  - Citroën Jumper/Relay
- Third generation (X250; 2006–present)
  - FIAT Ducato III
  - Peugeot Boxer/Manager
  - Citroën Jumper/Relay
  - Opel Movano (2022–present)
  - Vauxhall Movano (2022–present)
  - Toyota Proace Max (2024–present)
  - IVECO eSuperJolly (2025–present)

Production by model between 1984 and 2025 in the SEVEL Sud factory:

FIAT Ducato Mk I (type ZFA 280 / 290)
Year	FIAT Ducato	Peugeot J5	Citroën C25	Production Total	Year	FIAT Ducato	Peugeot J5	Citroën C25	Production Total
1984	50 180	19 905	19 511	89 596	1989	94 300	35 900	29 149	159 349
1985	45 010	22 875	17 000	84 885	1990	139 768	37 915	28 731	206 414
1986	46 420	26 600	18 700	91 720	1991	143 301	36 669	22 090	202 060
1988	55 730	32 865	32 400	120 995	1992	114 392	33 764	12 839	160 995
1989	94 300	35 900	29 149	159 349	1993	74 140	20 758	2 864	97 762
Total production Ducato Mk I (type ZFA 280 / 290) : 1 085 136

FIAT Ducato Mk II (type ZFA 230 / 244)
Year	FIAT Ducato	Peugeot Boxer	Citroën Jumper	Production Total	Year	FIAT Ducato Italy	Peugeot Boxer	Citroën Jumper	FIAT Ducato Brazil	Production Total
1994	107 000	31 181	20 316	158 497	2000	106 464	61 008	37 845	692	206 009
1995	73 154	38 099	27 529	138 845	2001	126 321	65 485	41 806	4 370	224 805
1996	68 908	35 777	24 517	129 202	2002	127 351	54 425	38 659	3 210	236 822
1997	80 508	39 673	25 456	145 637	2003	124 972	46 690	41 875	2 862	216 399
1998	98 024	44 996	27 455	170 475	2004	126 166	47 038	45 921	4 941	224 066
1999	102 641	42 558	29 428	174 627	2005	110 379	42 674	47 801	5 361	206 215
Total production Ducato Mk II (type ZFA 230 / 244) : 2 231 599

FIAT Ducato Mk III (type ZFA 250)
Year	FIAT Ducato	Peugeot Boxer	Citroën Jumper	FIAT Ducato Brazil	RAM ProMaster Mexico	Production Total
2006	129 796	43 879	44 191	5 597		217 866
2007	154 308	56 629	51 774	7 275		262 711
2008	140 036	52 393	58 215	8 935		250 644
2009	70 674	23 916	23 194	8 021		117 784
2010	105 548	37 038	46 716	11 425		189 302
2011	125 944	44 267	54 451	15 362		224 662
2012	116 103	40 249	50 477	10 500		206 829
2013	114 479	39 667	49 054	14 414	12 840	203 200
2014	133 500	45 255	51 036	NC	24 291	229 791
2015	151 894	51 119	57 847	NC	24 291	260 860
2016	170 215	55 671	64 423	NC	45 198	290 309
2017	164 227	60 852	67 736		48 505	292 815

Source OICA.

Note: The FIAT Ducato is also manufactured in Russia (15,000 ex per year since 2007).

=== SEVEL Campania ===
The SEVEL Campania S.p.A. is the second factory of SEVEL Sud located in Pomigliano d'Arco, near Naples. The factory produced the FIAT Ducato and Talento and the rebadged Alfa Romeo AR6 until 1994 when it was discontinued..

== Other use of the SEVEL acronym ==
The SEVEL acronym was also used by FIAT and Peugeot's Argentinian subsidiary after they merged in December 1980. Here, however, the abbreviation signified Sociedad Europea de Vehículos para Latinoamérica (European Company for making Vehicles for Latin America).

SEVEL Uruguay was founded in 1984, and had a SEVEL plant in Montevideo, Uruguay.

== Timeline ==
Timeline of vehicles developed under the SEVEL joint venture or produced in SEVEL factories
Brand	1980s	1990s	2000s	2010s	2020s
1	2	3	4	5	6	7	8	9	0	1	2	3	4	5	6	7	8	9	0	1	2	3	4	5	6	7	8	9	0	1	2	3	4	5	6	7	8	9	0	1	2	3	4	5	6
Alfa Romeo	LCV	AR6
Citroën	MPV	Nemo M.s.
Evasion / Synergie	C8	SpaceTourer
LCV	Nemo
Jumpy / Dispatch I	Jumpy / Dispatch II	Jumpy / Dispatch III
C25	Jumper / Relay I	Jumper / Relay II
FIAT	MPV	Qubo
Ulysse I	Ulysse II	Ulysse III
LCV	Fiorino III
Talento I	Scudo I	Scudo II	Scudo III
Ducato I	Ducato II	Ducato III
Lancia	MPV	Zeta	Phedra
Opel	MPV	Zafira Life
LCV	Vivaro C
Movano C
Peugeot	MPV	Bipper Tepee
806	807	Traveller
LCV	Bipper
Expert I	Expert II	Expert III
J5	Boxer I	Boxer II / Manager
RAM	LCV	V700 City
ProMaster
Talbot	LCV	Express
Toyota	MPV	ProAce Verso
LCV	ProAce I	ProAce II
ProAce Max
Vauxhall	MPV	Vivaro Life
LCV	Vivaro III
Movano C
Legend	Manufactured by SEVEL Sud in Italy; Manufactured by SEVEL Nord in France; Manufactured by FCA in Mexico; Manufactured by FIAT Tofaş in Turkey; Manufactured by PSA in the UK; Note that in some cases, models are also manufactured elsewhere. For example, as of 2020, the Citroën Jumpy, Peugeot Expert and Opel Vivaro are also produced in Kaluga, Russia.
