= Single Administrative Document =

The Single Administrative Document (SAD), also known as Form C88 in the UK, is the main customs form used in international trade to or from the European Union Customs Union. Traders and agents can use the SAD to assist with declaring import, export, transit and community status declarations in manual processing situations. It is used for EU trade with non-EU countries and for the movement of non-EU goods within the EU, and replaced the various national forms in use among member states before its introduction in 1988.

SAD legislation needed to take full account of today's environment and adapt with the evolution that occurred since its inception. Regulation 2286/2003 did this by introducing a radical modernization of data collection on EU customs declarations.

The SAD breaks down into 54 boxes; the full version comes in 8 parts for use at different points in the trading process; see also the C88A alternative version of the form.

The SAD can be filled in by the consignee or by an agent representing them.

All instructions to complete the Single Administrative Document are stated in Commission Delegated Regulation (EU) 2016/341 of 17 December 2015.
