= Employment Service Convention, 1948 =

International Labour Organization Convention

C88
- ILO Convention
- Date of adoption: 9 July 1948
- Date in force: 10 August 1950
- Classification: Employment Services - Job Placement
- Subject: Employment policy and Promotion
- Previous: Freedom of Association and Protection of the Right to Organise Convention, 1948
- Next: Night Work (Women) Convention (Revised), 1948

Employment Service Convention, 1948 is an International Labour Organization Convention.

It was established in 1948, with the preamble stating:

Having decided upon the adoption of certain proposals concerning the organisation of the employment service,...

== Ratifications ==
As of December 2022, the convention has been ratified by 92 states. Of the ratifying states, three states have denounced the treaty.
