= Eurovans =

Family of motor vehicles

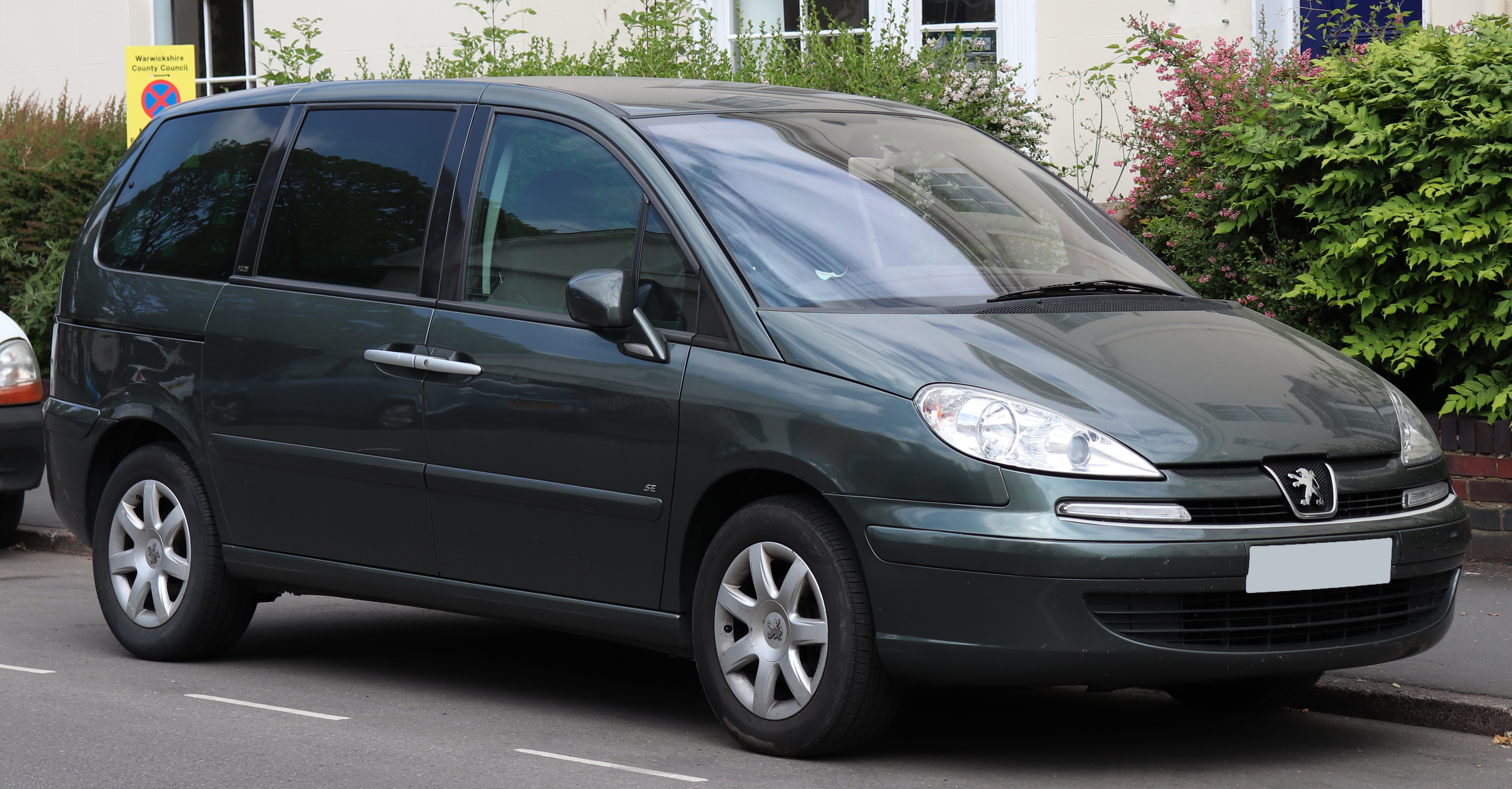
- Peugeot 807 (facelift), one of the four Eurovan versions

Overview
- Manufacturer: Sevel Nord
- Production: March 1994 – June 2014
- Assembly: France: Lieu-Saint-Amand (Sevel)

Body and chassis
- Class: Large MPV (M)
- Body style: 5-door MPV
- Layout: Front-engine, front-wheel-drive
- Related: Sevel Nord vans

Chronology
- Successor: For FCA: Fiat Freemont; Lancia Voyager; Fiat Ulysse (Ulysse Nameplate) For PSA: Citroën Space Tourer/Peugeot Traveller; Citroën Grand C4 Picasso; Peugeot 5008 II; Citroën C5 Aircross

The Eurovans are a family of large MPV's from the Citroën, Peugeot, Fiat and Lancia marques that were produced at the jointly owned Sevel Nord factory in France. The term Eurovan was not used by the brands themselves in sales literature, but rather by the motoring press to refer to the vans collectively. It was launched in March 1994, and production ceased in November 2010 for the Fiat and Lancia models, and in June 2014 for the Citroën and Peugeot siblings. They are considered to be large MPVs.

The Eurovans differ little technically and visually, being a prime example of badge engineering. They share mechanicals and body structure with the Sevel Nord light commercial vans, the Citroën Jumpy (Dispatch), Fiat Scudo and Peugeot Expert.

The first generation Eurovans were marketed as the Citroën Evasion (Citroën Synergie in the UK), Fiat Ulysse, Lancia Zeta / Lancia Z and Peugeot 806. The second generation models were all renamed, except the Fiat Ulysse, with the nameplates now Citroën C8, Lancia Phedra and Peugeot 807.

== First generation (1994–2002) ==
First generation
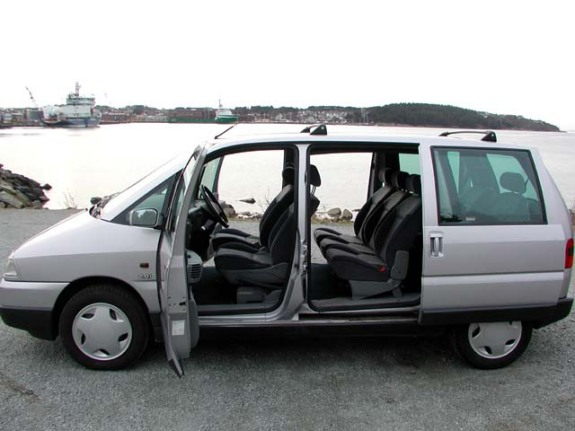
- 1998 Citroën Evasion

Overview
- Also called: Citroën Evasion; Citroën Synergie; Fiat Ulysse; Lancia Z Lancia Zeta; Peugeot 806
- Production: March 1994 – September 2002

Body and chassis
- Platform: Sevel Nord vans

The first generation Eurovans were introduced in June 1994. They are smaller than American vans, like the Chrysler Voyager, which is also available in Europe. Like the Toyota Previa, and American minivans, they had sliding rear side doors, a trait they share with their commercial siblings. While the Voyager also came in "Grand" versions with elongated body and wheelbase (and the Espace followed suit in 1997), the Eurovans only came in one size.

The Eurovans were almost identical, the differences consisting in different grilles, lower tailgates/taillights, wheel covers/alloy wheels and exterior and interior badging, as well as different trim levels. In October 1998, the Eurovans were mildly facelifted.

Inside, the gear lever was mounted on the dashboard rather than on the floor, and the handbrake is on the door side of the driver's seat, which allowed for the removal of middle console and opened up a passage between the front seats. The seating configurations included two fixed seats (swivelling on some models) in front and three individual removable seats in the middle row, along with optional two individual removable seats or a three seater bench in the third row.

=== Engines ===
The first generation Eurovans utilized PSA's XU/XUD engines, regardless of brand. They were later replaced by the PSA EW/DW engine. All were mated to five speed manual transmissions, apart from the 2.0 16-valve EW petrol engine, which had an option of a four speed automatic.

Name	Fuel	Volume	Output	Torque	Engine code	Notes
1.8 8v	Petrol	1,761 cc (1.761 L; 107.5 cu in)	99 PS (73 kW; 98 hp) at 5750 rpm	147 N⋅m (108 lb⋅ft) at 2600 rpm	XU7	Not available for Lancia Zeta, phased out in 2000
2.0 8v	Petrol	1,998 cc (1.998 L; 121.9 cu in)	121 PS (89 kW; 119 hp) at 5750 rpm	170 N⋅m (125 lb⋅ft) at 2650 rpm	XU10 2C	Not available for Lancia Zeta, phased out in 2000
2.0 16v	Petrol	1,998 cc (1.998 L; 121.9 cu in)	132 PS (97 kW; 130 hp) at 5500 rpm	180 N⋅m (133 lb⋅ft) at 4200 rpm	XU10 J4	Phased out in 2000
2.0 16v	Petrol	1,997 cc (1.997 L; 121.9 cu in)	136 PS (100 kW; 134 hp) at 6000 rpm	190 N⋅m (140 lb⋅ft) at 4100 rpm	EW10 J4	Optional automatic transmission; replaced all previous petrol engines in July 2000
2.0 8v Turbo	Petrol	1,998 cc (1.998 L; 121.9 cu in)	147 PS (108 kW; 145 hp) at 5300 rpm	235 N⋅m (173 lb⋅ft) at 2500 rpm	XU10 J2TE	Phased out in 2000
1.9 8v TD	Diesel	1,905 cc (1.905 L; 116.3 cu in)	90 PS (66 kW; 89 hp) at 4000 rpm	196 N⋅m (145 lb⋅ft) at 2250 rpm	XUD9	Not available for Lancia Zeta, phased out in 2000
2.1 12v TD	Diesel	2,088 cc (2.088 L; 127.4 cu in)	109 PS (80 kW; 108 hp) at 4300 rpm	250 N⋅m (184 lb⋅ft) at 2000 rpm	XUD11	Phased out in 2000
2.0 8v HDi/JTD	Diesel	1,997 cc (1.997 L; 121.9 cu in)	109 PS (80 kW; 108 hp) at 4000 rpm	250 N⋅m (184 lb⋅ft) at 1750 rpm	DW10ATED	PSA's new HDI engine, billed JTD by Fiat in spite of that; introduced in January 2000 to replace both previous diesels
2.0 16v HDi/JTD	Diesel	1,997 cc (1.997 L; 121.9 cu in)	109 PS (80 kW; 108 hp) at 4000 rpm	270 N⋅m (199 lb⋅ft) at 1750 rpm	DW10ATED4	16 valve version of HDi engine, introduced in 2001

=== Model differences ===
==== Citroën Evasion ====
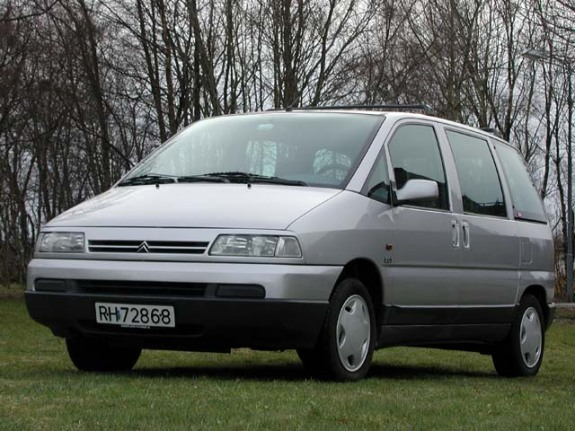
Citroën Evasion (pre-facelift)

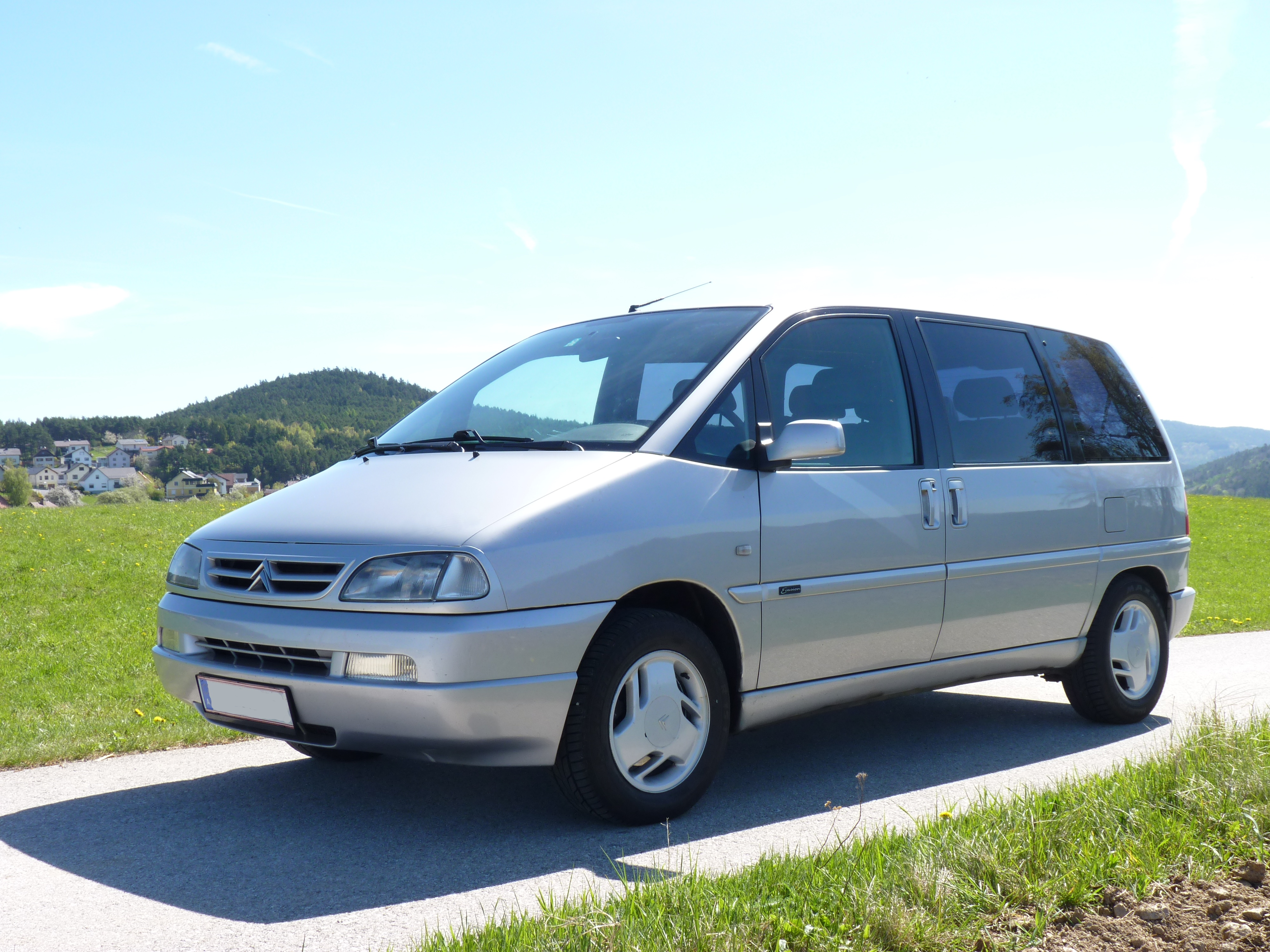
Citroën Evasion (facelift)

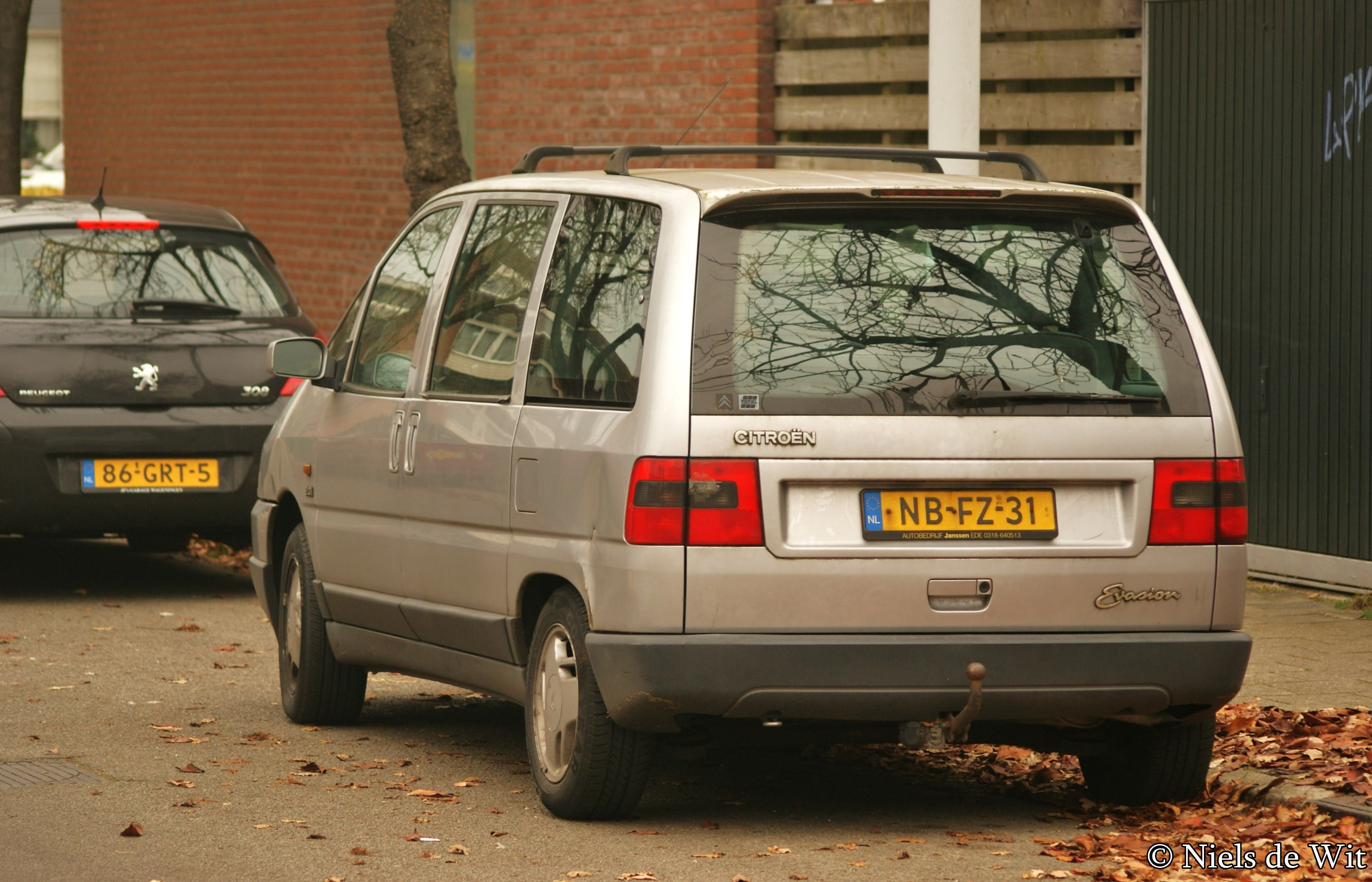
Citroën Evasion (pre-facelift)

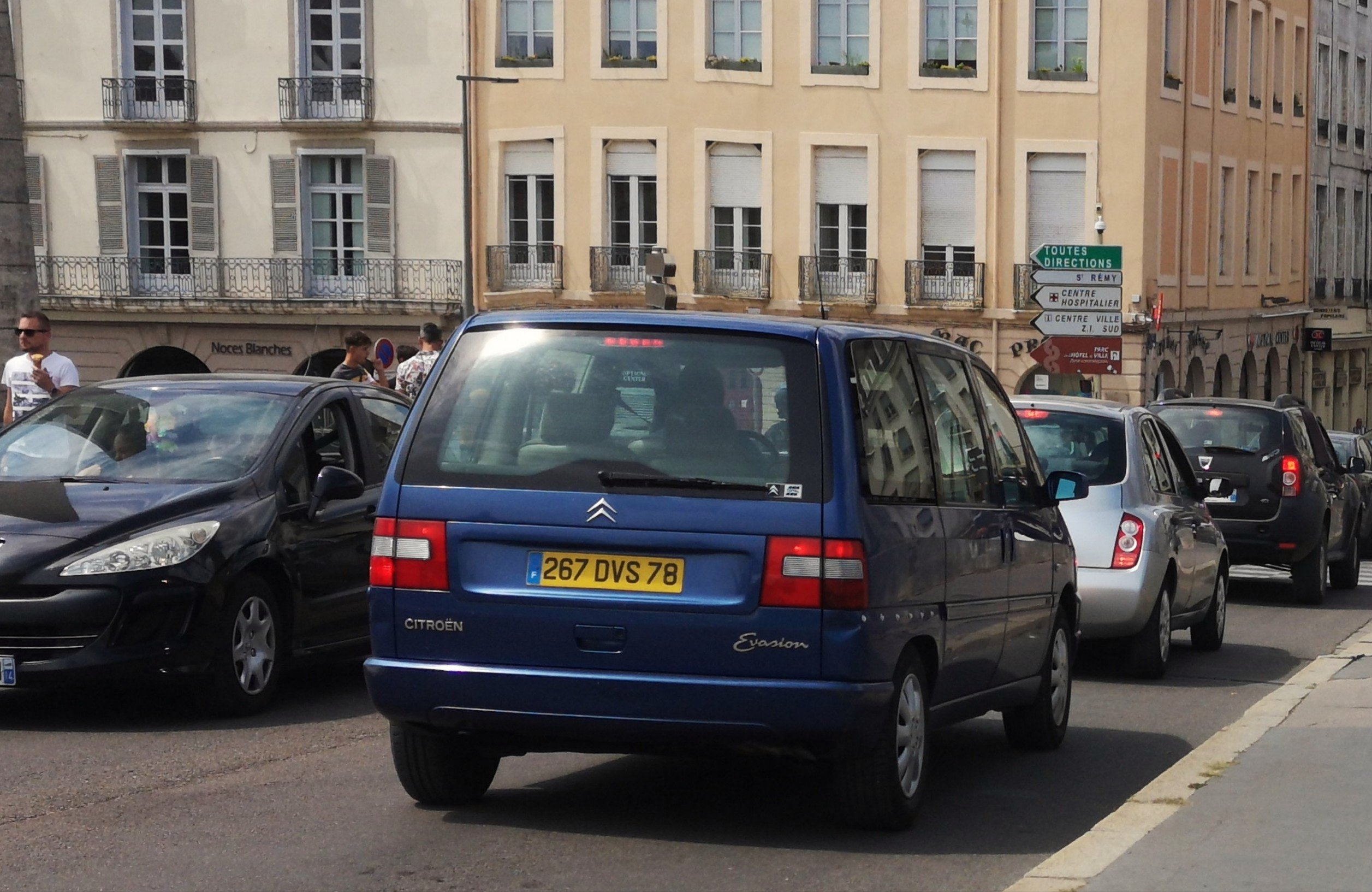
Citroën Evasion (facelift)

The Evasion (French: Évasion) was badged Synergie in the RHD markets of both the United Kingdom and Ireland. However, the car maintained the Evasion name in New Zealand. In October 1998, the Citroën Evasion got a slight facelift, including a larger logo and a restyling of the front grille and rear bumper. More than 120,000 Evasion/Synergie were produced.

===== Evasion Windows 95 edition =====
A special version of the Evasion was produced to prepare for the arrival of Bill Gates to sell Windows 95 in France. 2 copies of the van were modified for the event and started the French automaker's dive into putting technology into cars. Sometimes called the Mobile Office, they later developed the Citroën Xsara Intel prototype in 1997 and the Citroën XM Multimedia prototype in 1998.

The van featured a custom desk holding a Siemens Nixdorf multimedia suite, including a laptop, laser printer, and a Siemens 53 phone with a hands-free kit.

One of the vans is still daily driven in France and one is unknown and may reside in the US.

==== Peugeot 806 ====
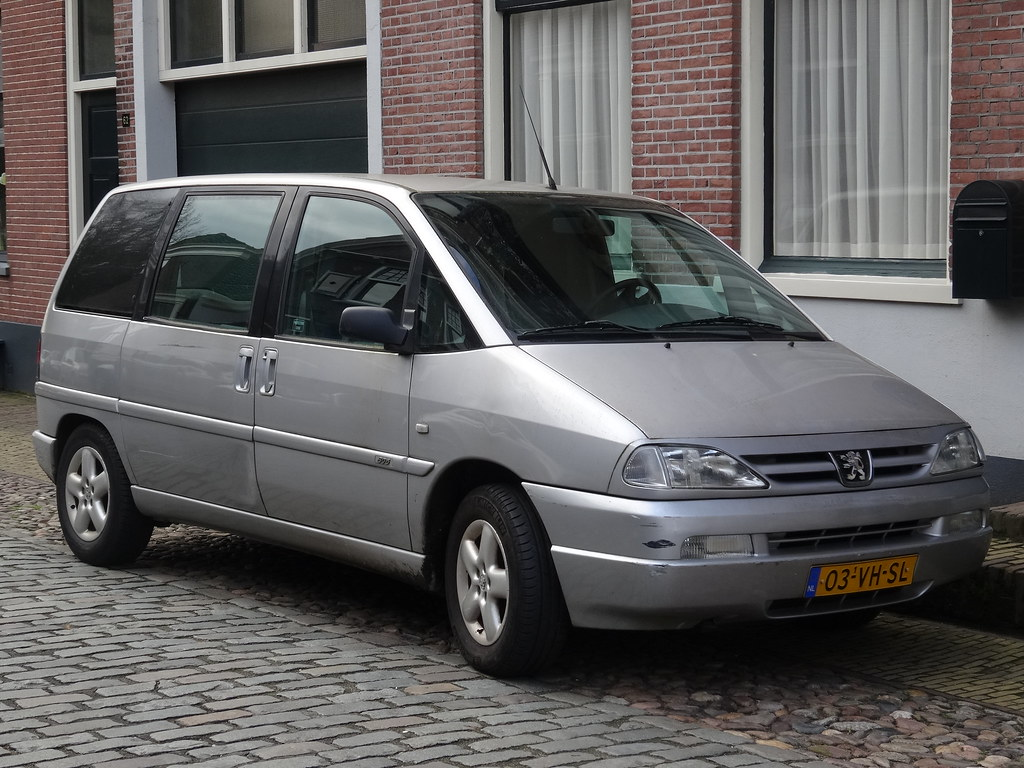
Peugeot 806 (facelift)

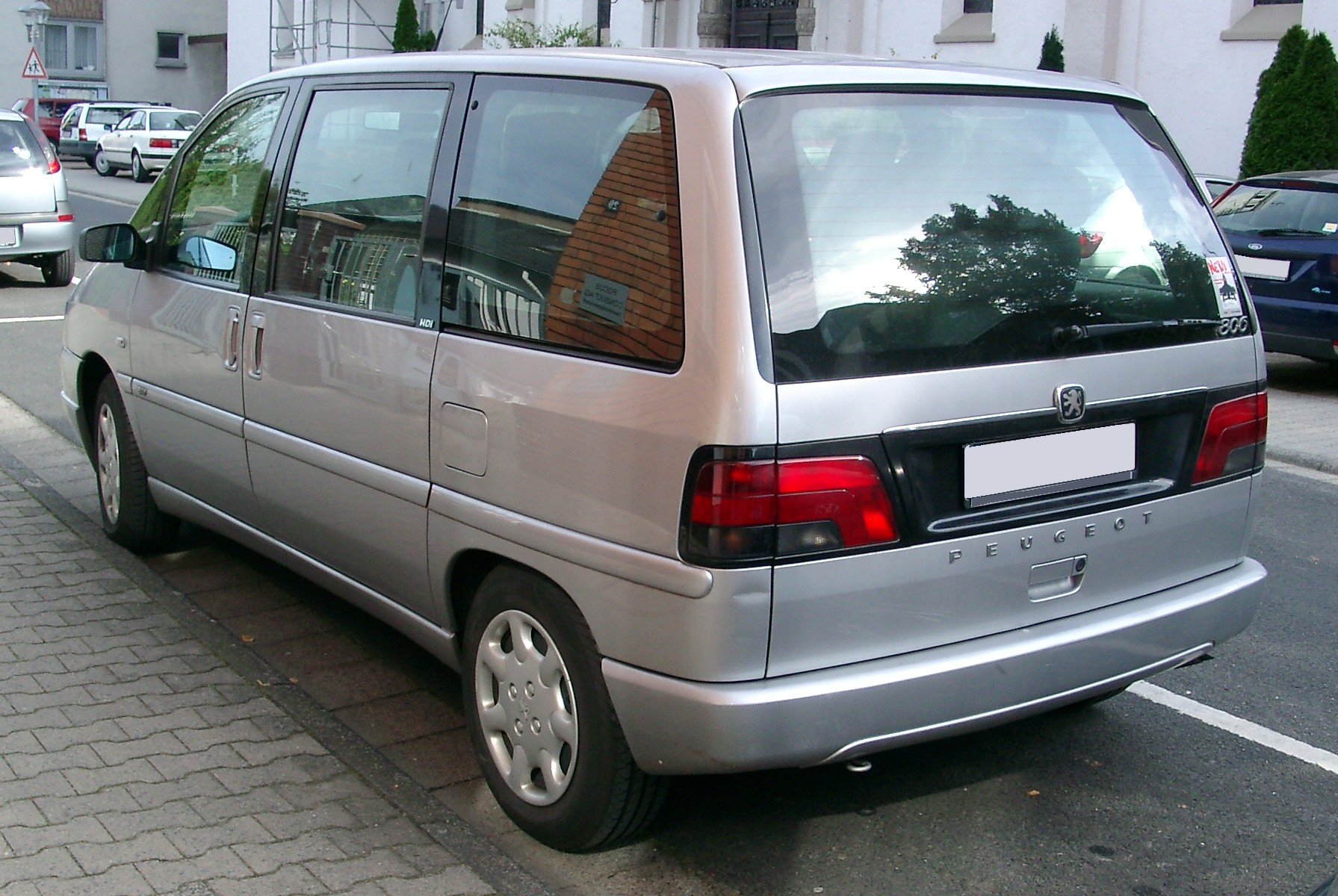
Peugeot 806

The 806 was named according to Peugeot's "x0x" system, where the first digit indicates model series (vehicle size/class) and the last indicates the generation, with a central zero. The largest Peugeot series then available was the executive saloon 605, so Peugeot chose 8, potentially leaving room for an in between model. The Eurovans were launched when Peugeot was replacing the "x05" with "x06" models, so it was appropriately labeled "806".

==== Fiat Ulysse ====
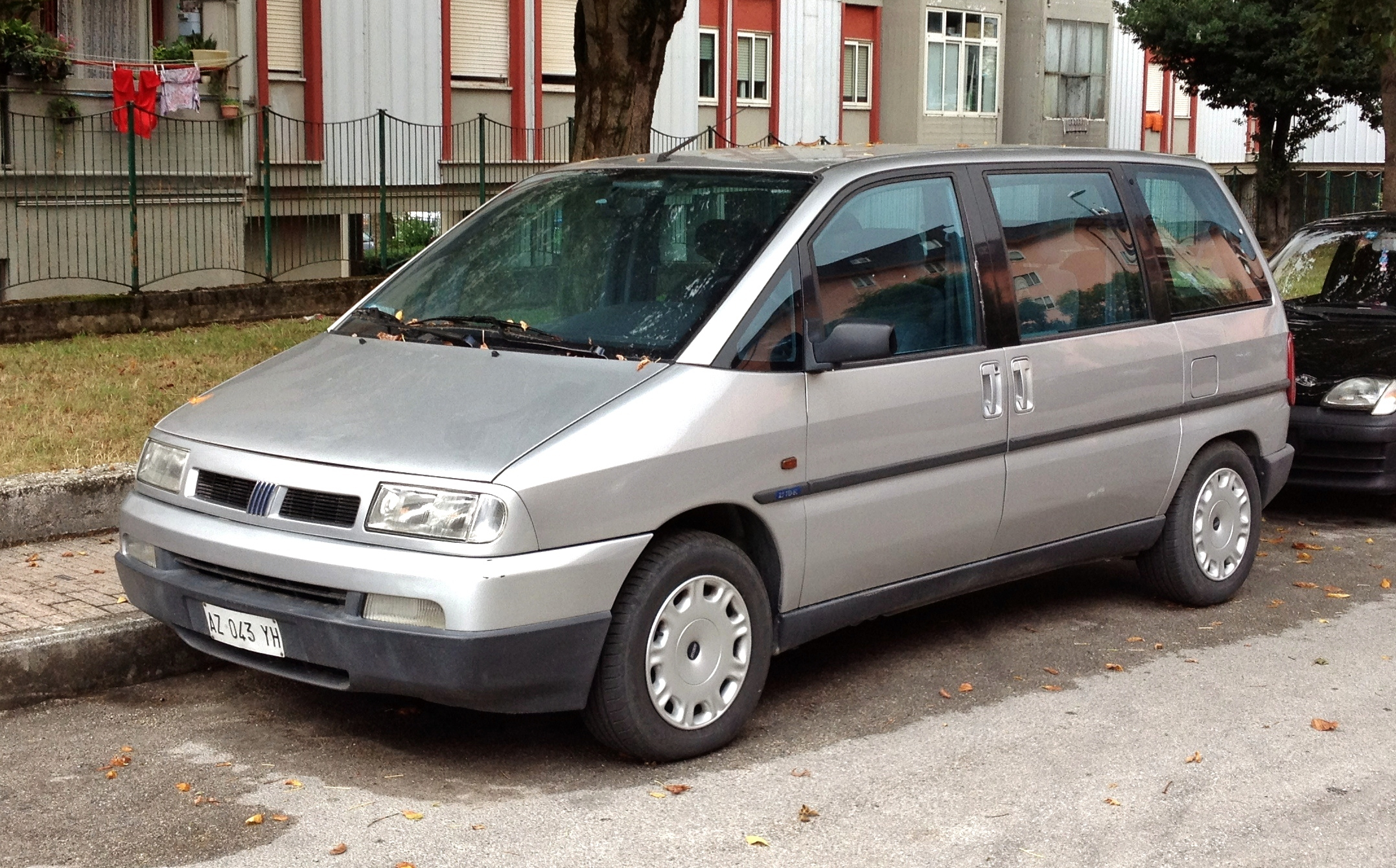
Fiat Ulysse (pre-facelift)

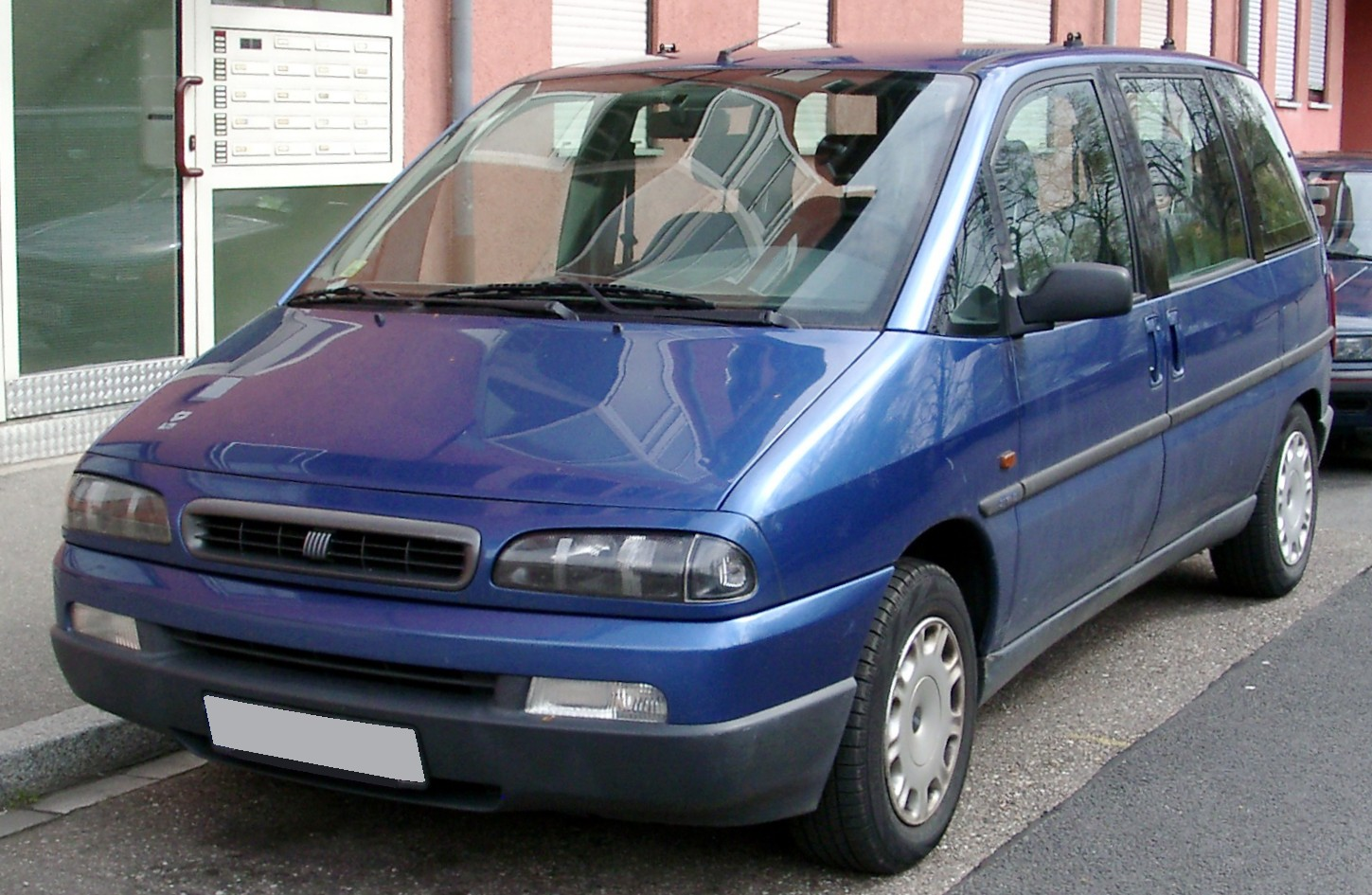
Fiat Ulysse (facelift)

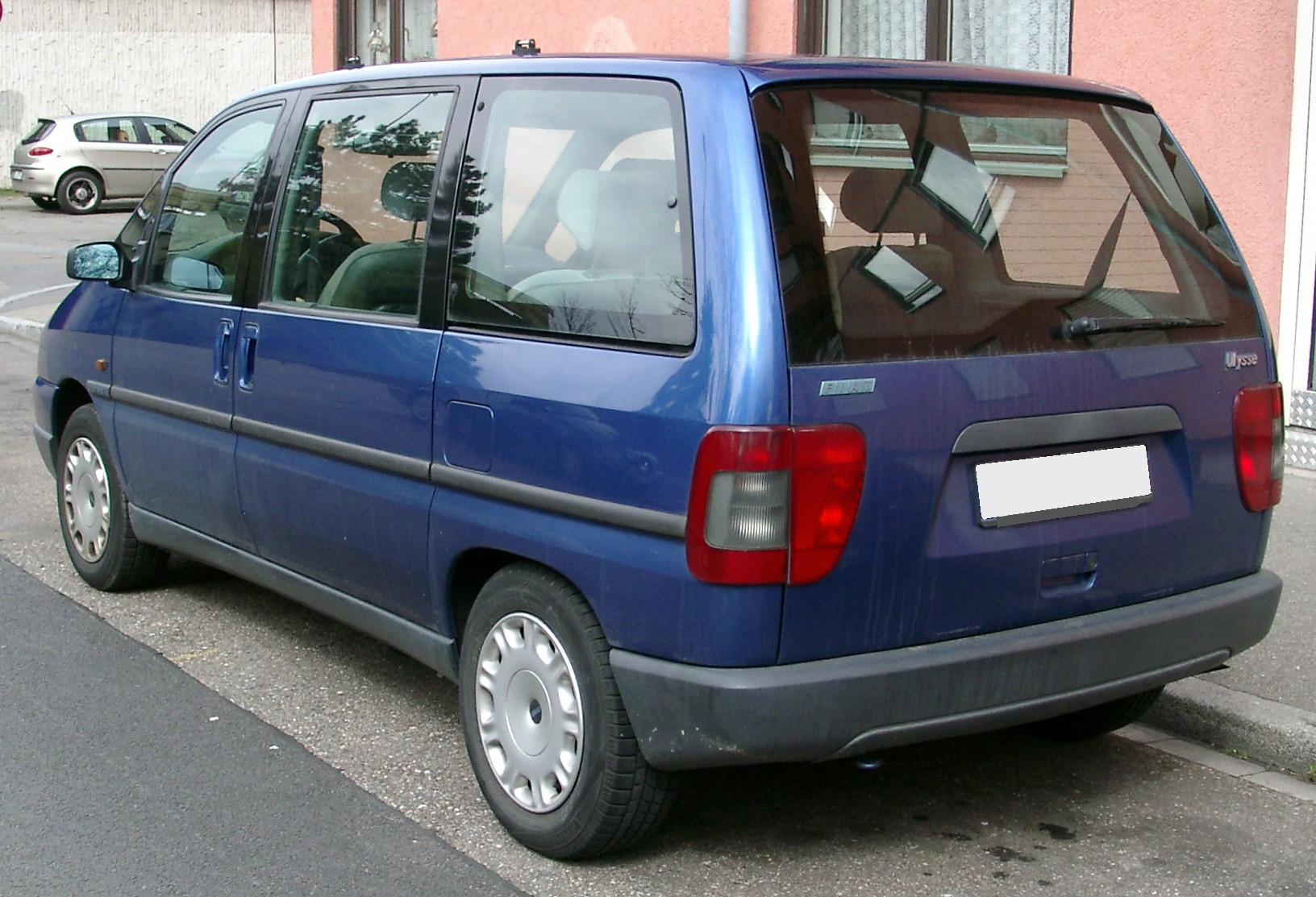
Fiat Ulysse (facelift)

The Fiat was named after Ulysses, the Roman name for Odysseus, the hero of Homer's Odyssey. Like its siblings, the Ulysse range received a facelift in October 1998.

==== Lancia Zeta ====
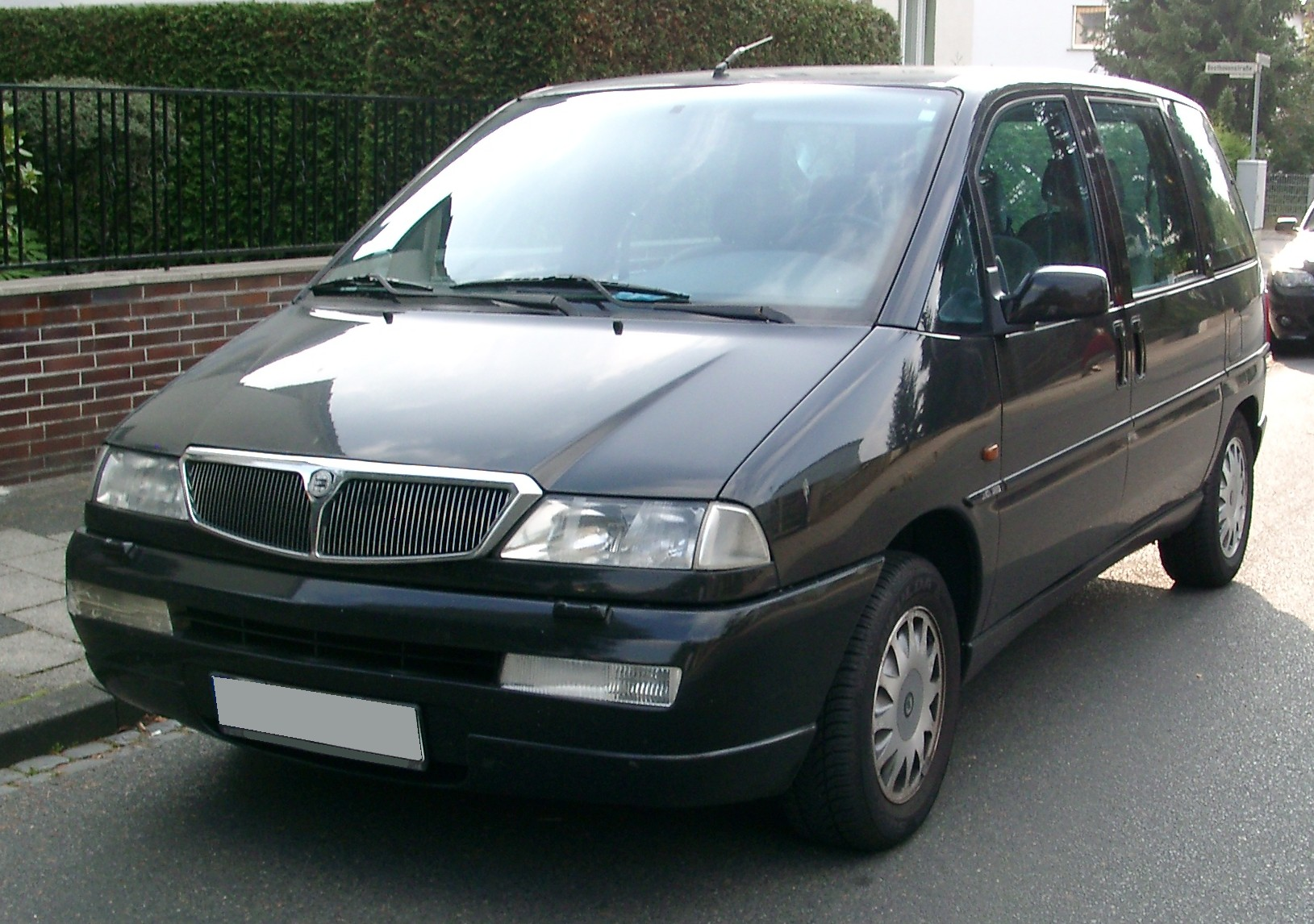
Lancia Zeta

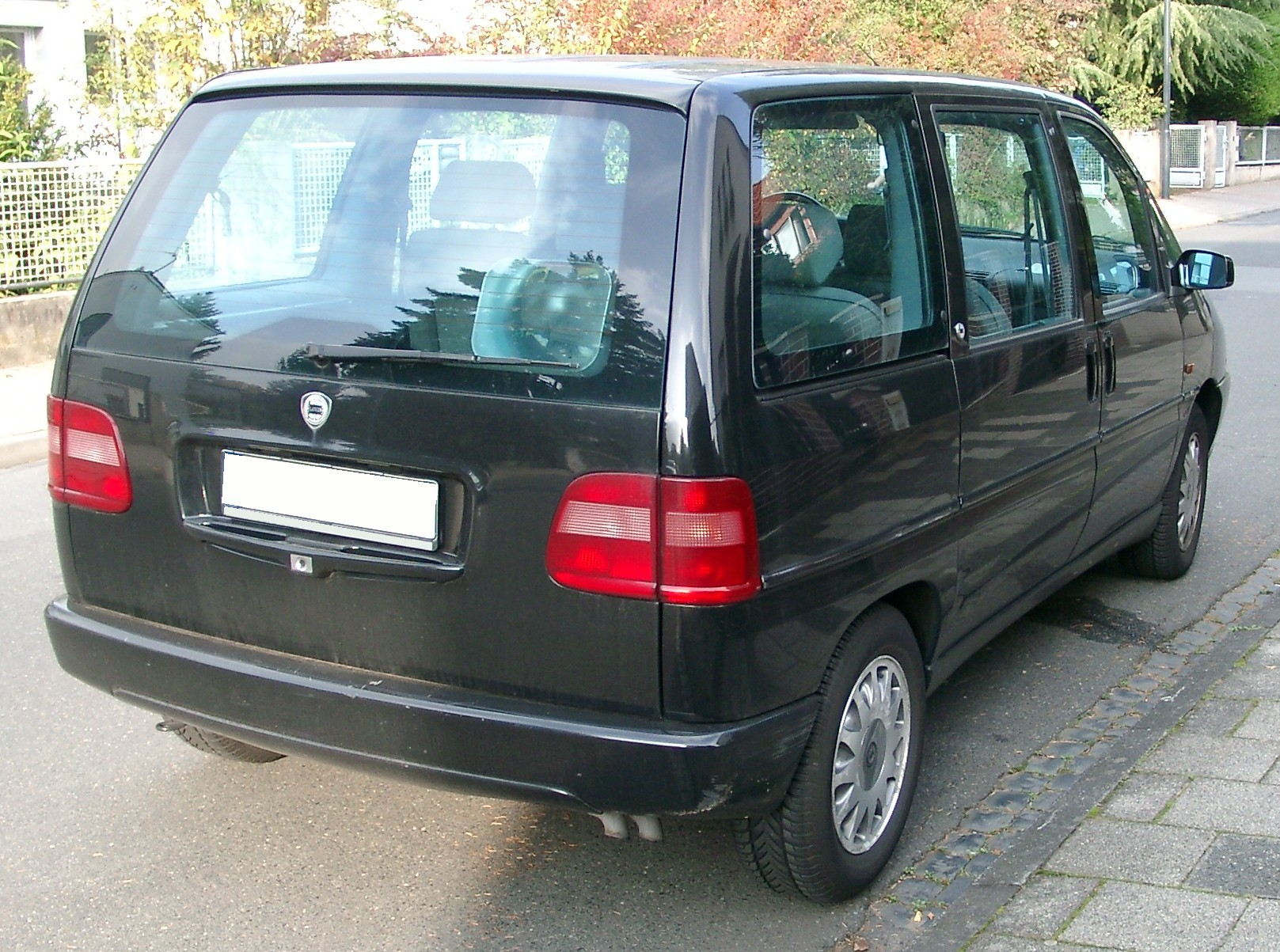
Lancia Zeta

Following the traditional naming theme, Lancia named its variant with the previously unused Greek letter Zeta. It was also marketed as the Lancia Z. With its big chrome grille, the Lancia served as the "premium" Eurovan, not available with base engines and exceptionally well equipped, with prices up to 20% higher than corresponding versions of other Eurovans.

The Zeta was not marketed in the UK.

== Second generation (2002–2014) ==
Second generation
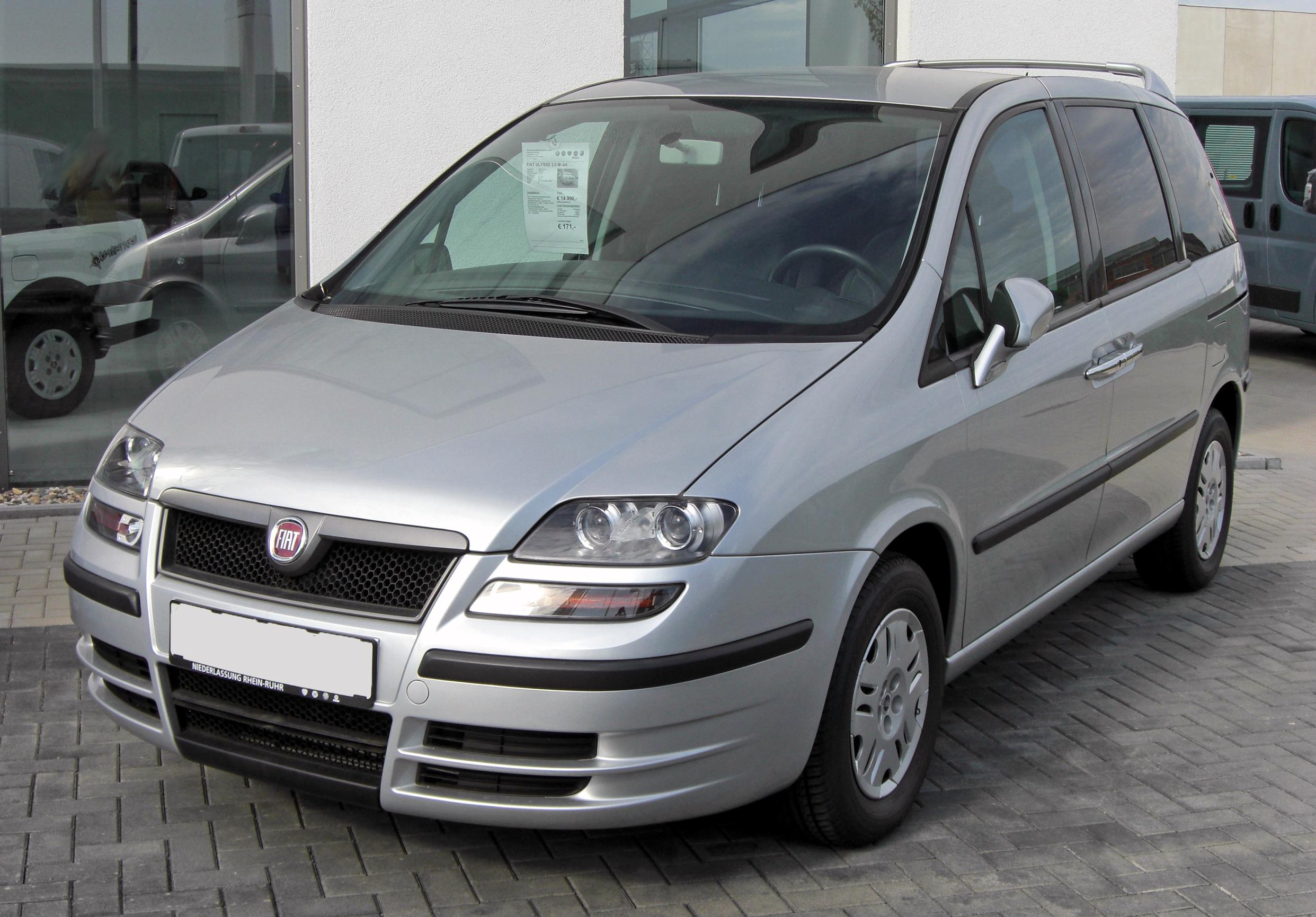
- Fiat Ulysse (second generation)

Overview
- Also called: Citroën C8; Peugeot 807; Fiat Ulysse; Lancia Phedra
- Production: October 2002 – June 2014 (Citroën and Peugeot); September 2002 – November 2010 (Fiat and Lancia)
- Designer: Centro Stile Lancia and Centro Stile Fiat

Body and chassis
- Platform: Sevel Nord vans

Dimensions
- Wheelbase: 2,823 mm (111.1 in)
- Length: 4,727 mm (186.1 in) (Peugeot 807); 4,750 mm (187.0 in) (Lancia Phedra)
- Width: 1,854 mm (73.0 in) (Peugeot 807); 1,863 mm (73.3 in) (Lancia Phedra)
- Height: 1,752 mm (69.0 in) (Peugeot 807)
- Curb weight: 1,783 kg (3,931 lb) (Lancia Phedra 2.2 JTD/94 kW)

In 2002, the second generation of the Eurovans was launched. The 807 itself was launched in June, followed by the C8 in July. The floorpan, wheelbase, and postponement were not transformed, but all exterior dimensions, including front and rear tracks, were increased. The increase in length of almost 30 cm greatly enhanced interior volume. The new Eurovans were afforded a much more bubbly, contemporary look, along with a modern looking dashboard with centrally mounted gauges.

The differences between the various versions were more marked, surrounding full front fascias and rear sections (including head and tail lights), as well as different interior colour themes. The middle and third row seats now had fore/aft sliders to increase flexibility and also adjustable backs. As with the first generation, a three seater bench seat was available in the third row, slotting into the standard third row seat runners, with back-lowering and tilt forward arrangements to increase boot space.

The Fiat and the Lancia were slightly wider than PSA vans, and the Phedra was longer than the other Eurovans.

The Citroën C8 and Peugeot 807 also got two light facelifts: the first one in February 2008, and the second one in 2012.

To highlight the launch of the V6 engine, Peugeot presented a design study called Peugeot 807 Grand Tourisme at the 2003 Geneva Motor Show. Despite the fancier four passenger interior and some mechanical and visual tuning, the car was essentially a top-of-the-line 807.

=== Engines ===
The engine range comprised again of different versions of the PSA EW/DW engine, paired with either five-speed manual or four-speed automatic transmissions. A six-speed manual option was added in the United Kingdom in the end of 2004. Additionally, top-of-the-line versions came with the PSA ES V6.

All diesels were PSA's HDIs, but Fiat models used JTD badging.

Name	Fuel	Volume	Output	Torque	Engine code	Notes
2.0 16v	Petrol	1,997 cc (1.997 L; 121.9 cu in)	136 PS (100 kW; 134 hp) at 6000 rpm	190 N⋅m (140 lb⋅ft) at 4100 rpm	EW10 J4	Later replaced by the new 140 PS version of the same engine
2.0 16v	Petrol	1,997 cc (1.997 L; 121.9 cu in)	140 PS (103 kW; 138 hp) at 6000 rpm	200 N⋅m (148 lb⋅ft) at 4000 rpm	EW10 A	Replaced the 136 PS version; not available for Fiat or Lancia
2.2 16v	Petrol	2,230 cc (2.23 L; 136 cu in)	158 PS (116 kW; 156 hp) at 5650 rpm	217 N⋅m (160 lb⋅ft) at 3900 rpm	EW12 J4	Not available for Fiat or Lancia
3.0 24v	Petrol	2,946 cc (2.946 L; 179.8 cu in)	207 PS (152 kW; 204 hp) at 6000 rpm	285 N⋅m (210 lb⋅ft) at 3750 rpm	ES9	Added in 2003, only available with automatic transmission
2.0 16v HDi/JTD	Diesel	1,997 cc (1.997 L; 121.9 cu in)	109 PS (80 kW; 108 hp) at 4000 rpm	270 N⋅m (199 lb⋅ft) at 1750 rpm	DW10	
2.0 16v HDi/JTD	Diesel	1,997 cc (1.997 L; 121.9 cu in)	120 PS (88 kW; 118 hp) at 4000 rpm	300 N⋅m (221 lb⋅ft) at 2000 rpm	DW10	
2.0 16v HDi/JTD	Diesel	1,997 cc (1.997 L; 121.9 cu in)	136 PS (100 kW; 134 hp) at 4000 rpm	320 N⋅m (236 lb⋅ft) at 2000 rpm	DW10 BTED4	
2.2 16v HDi/JTD	Diesel	2,179 cc (2.179 L; 133.0 cu in)	128 PS (94 kW; 126 hp) at 4000 rpm	314 N⋅m (232 lb⋅ft) at 2000 rpm	DW12 TED4	The engine code used in Eurovans is 4HW; Only available with manual transmission, in 2005 changed to six-speed
2.2 16v HDi/JTD	Diesel	2,179 cc (2.179 L; 133.0 cu in)	170 PS (125 kW; 168 hp) at 4000 rpm	370 N⋅m (273 lb⋅ft) at 1500 rpm	DW12	From 2008, a new 2.2 bi-TURBO

=== Model differences ===
==== Citroën C8 ====
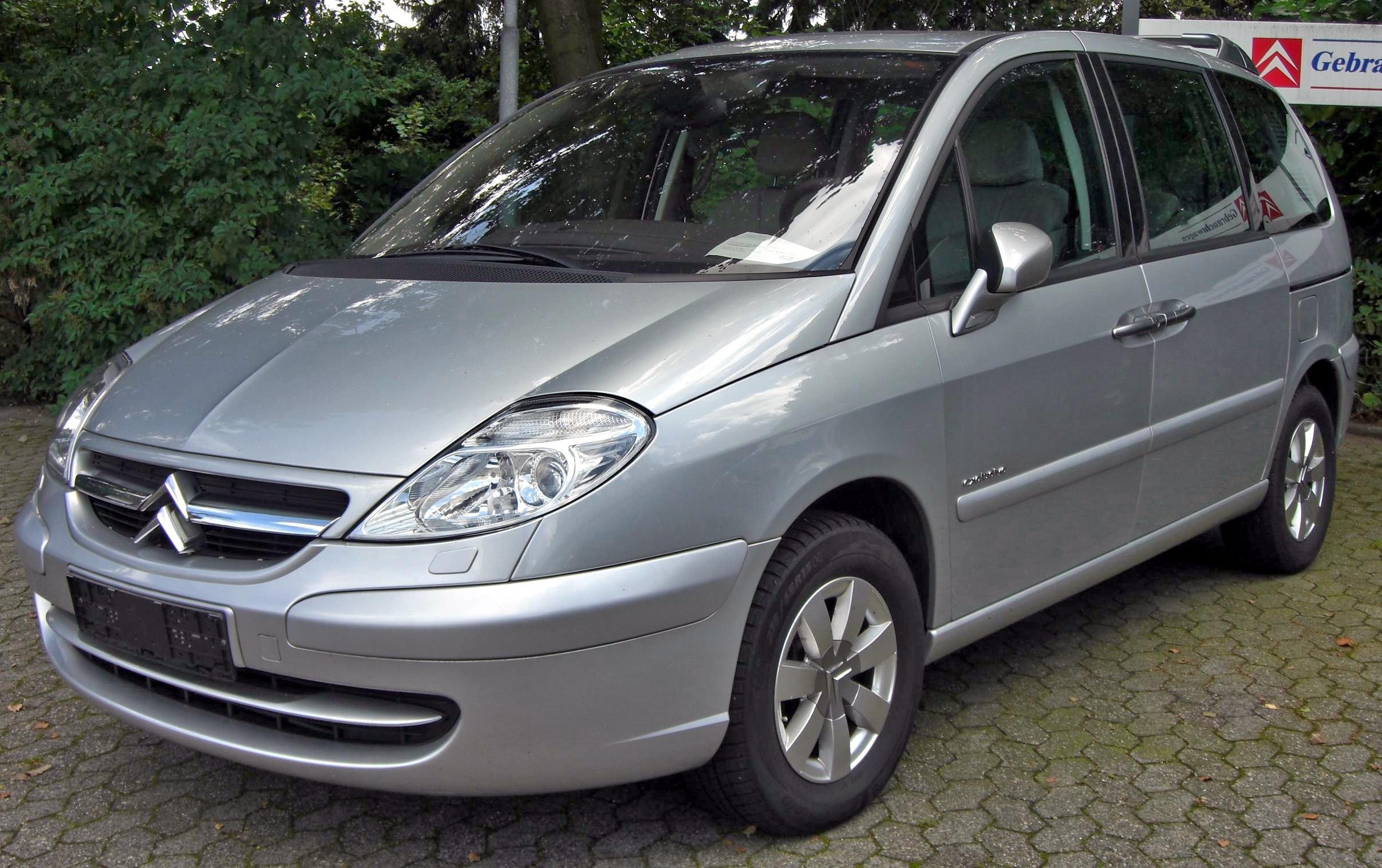
Citroën C8

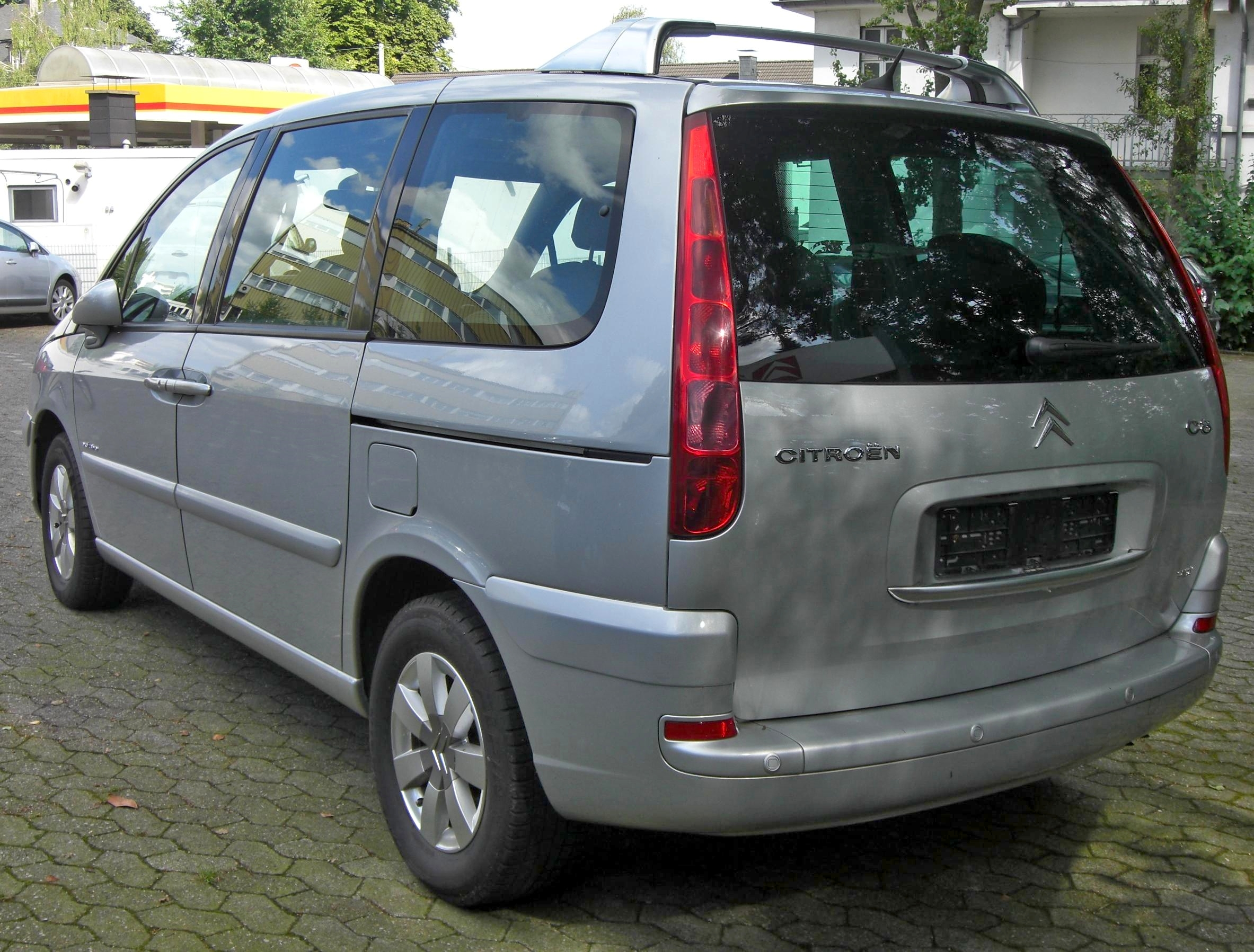
Citroën C8

The C8 follows Citroën's new naming scheme of the letter "C" followed by a number roughly corresponding to the relative size of a given model.

==== Peugeot 807 ====
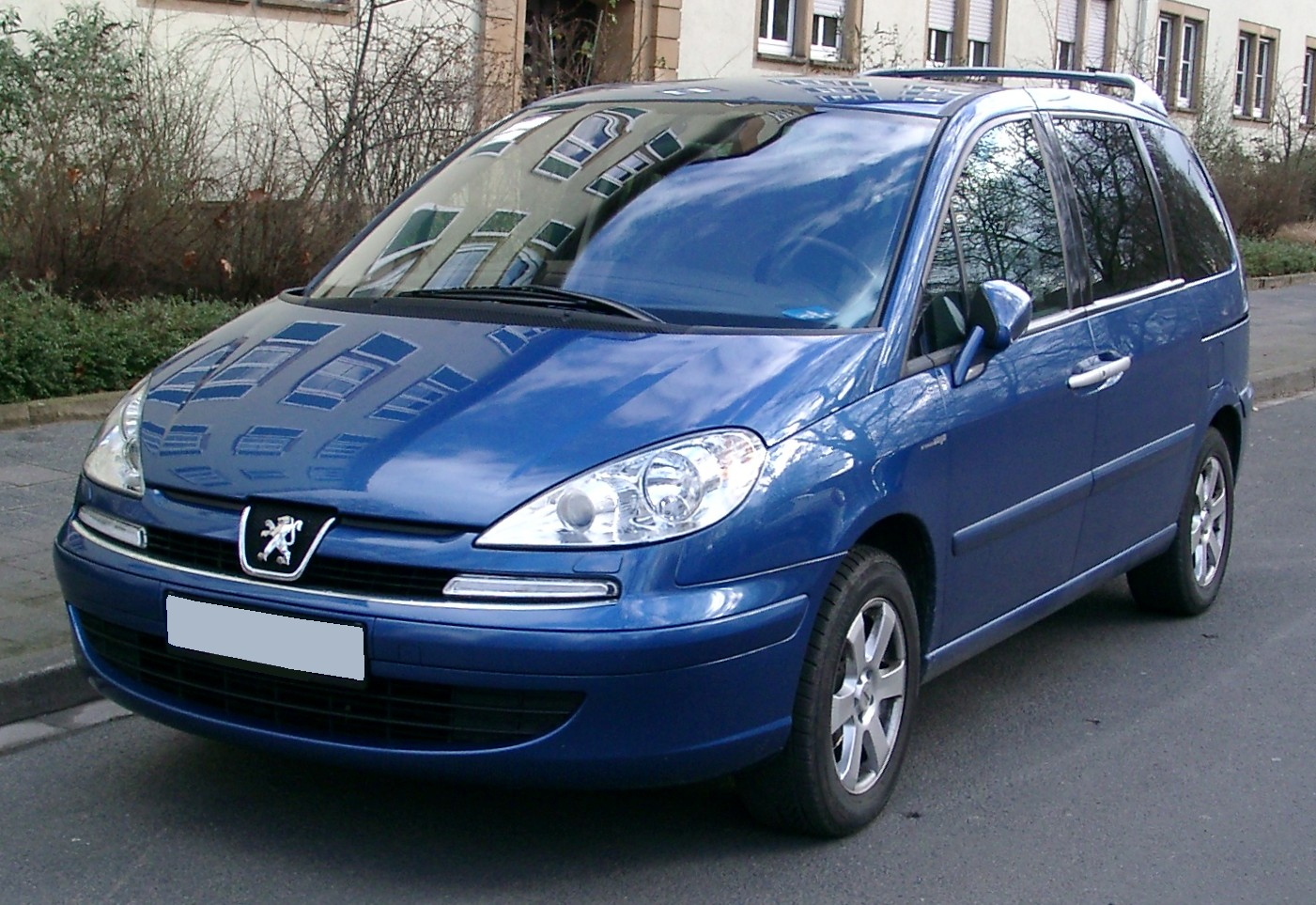
Peugeot 807

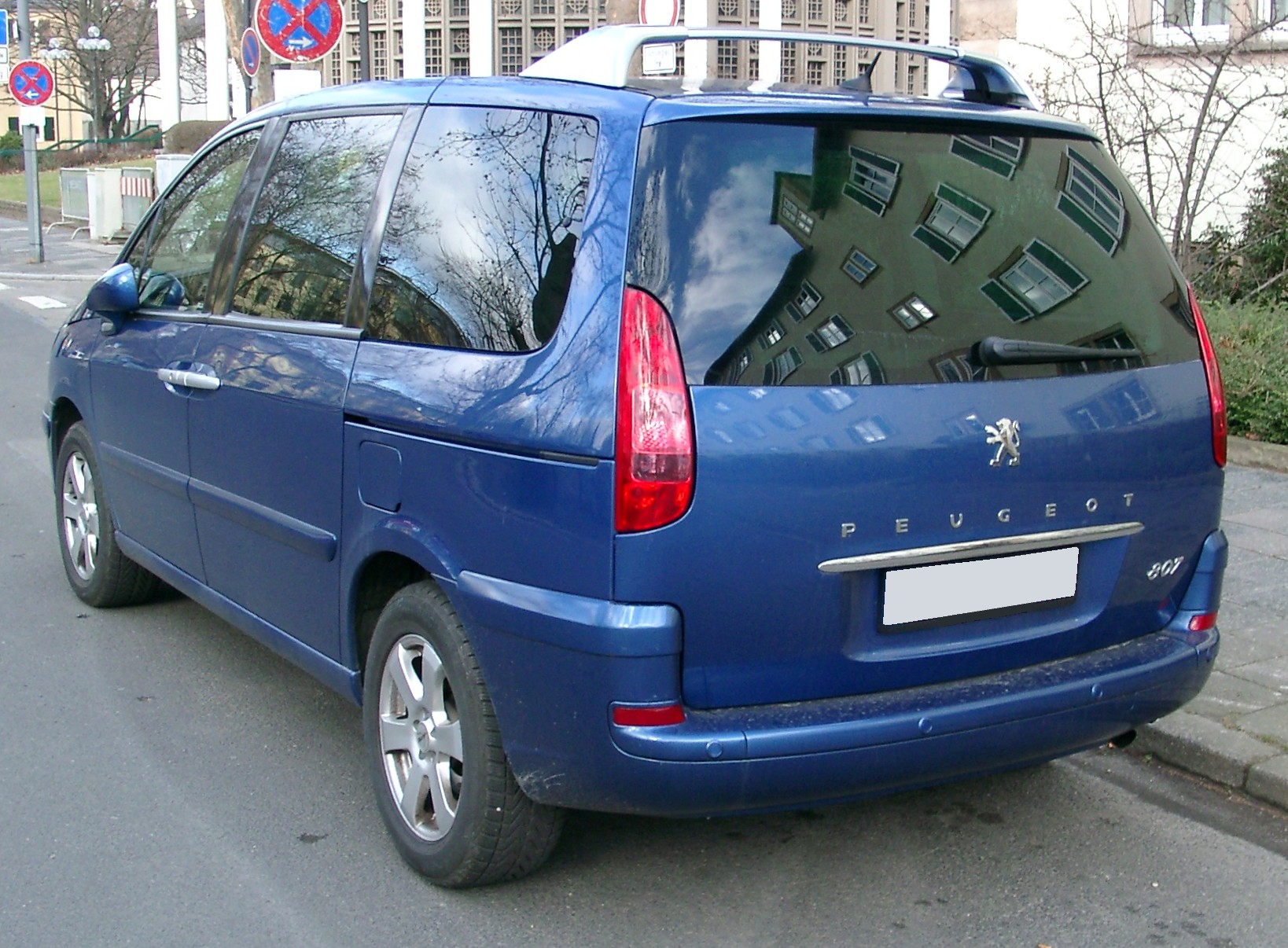
Peugeot 807

The 807 replaced the 806.

==== Fiat Ulysse ====
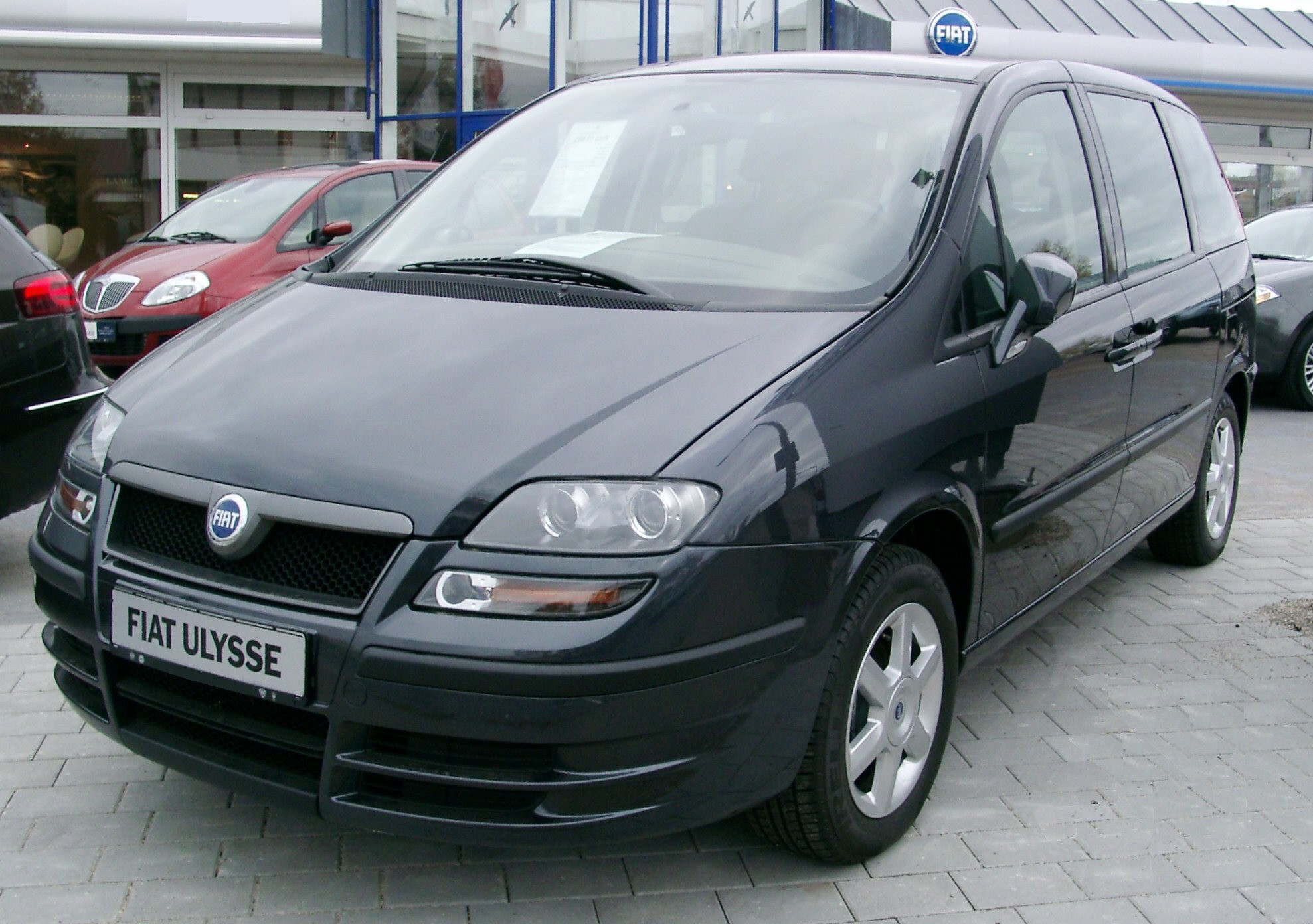
Fiat Ulysse

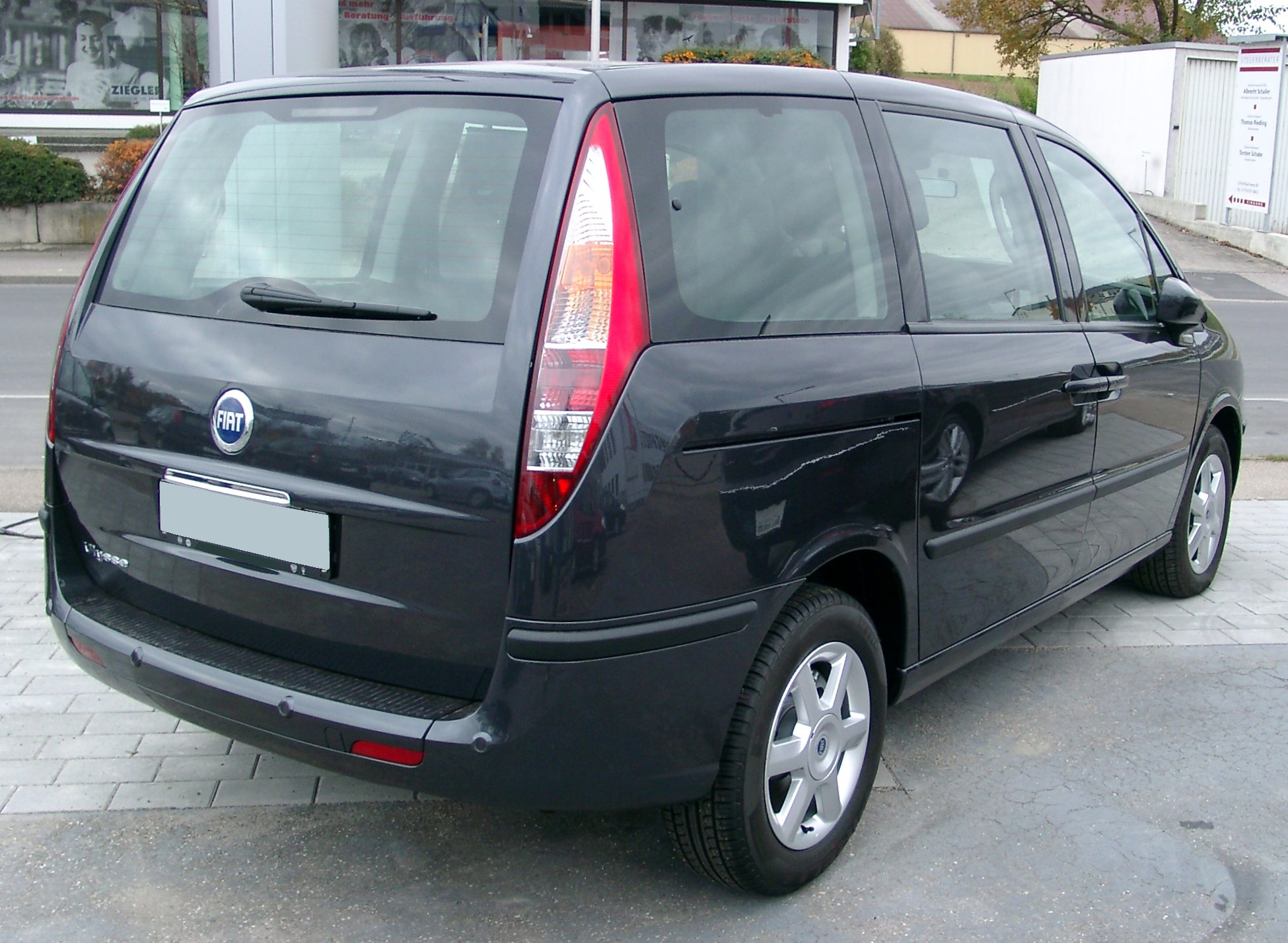
Fiat Ulysse

Fiat retained the Ulysse name for its second generation. The direct successor was the Fiat Freemont.

==== Lancia Phedra ====
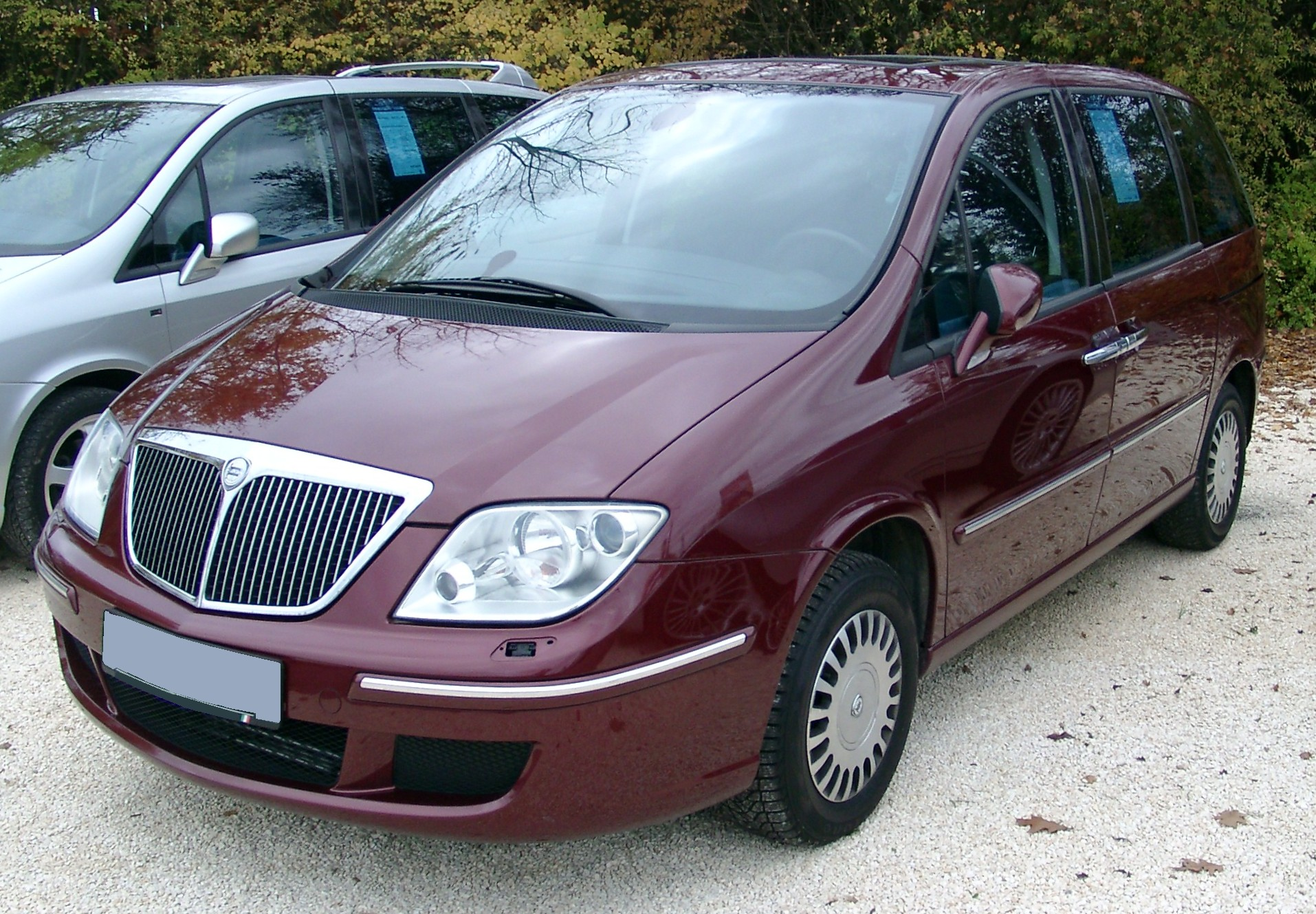
Lancia Phedra

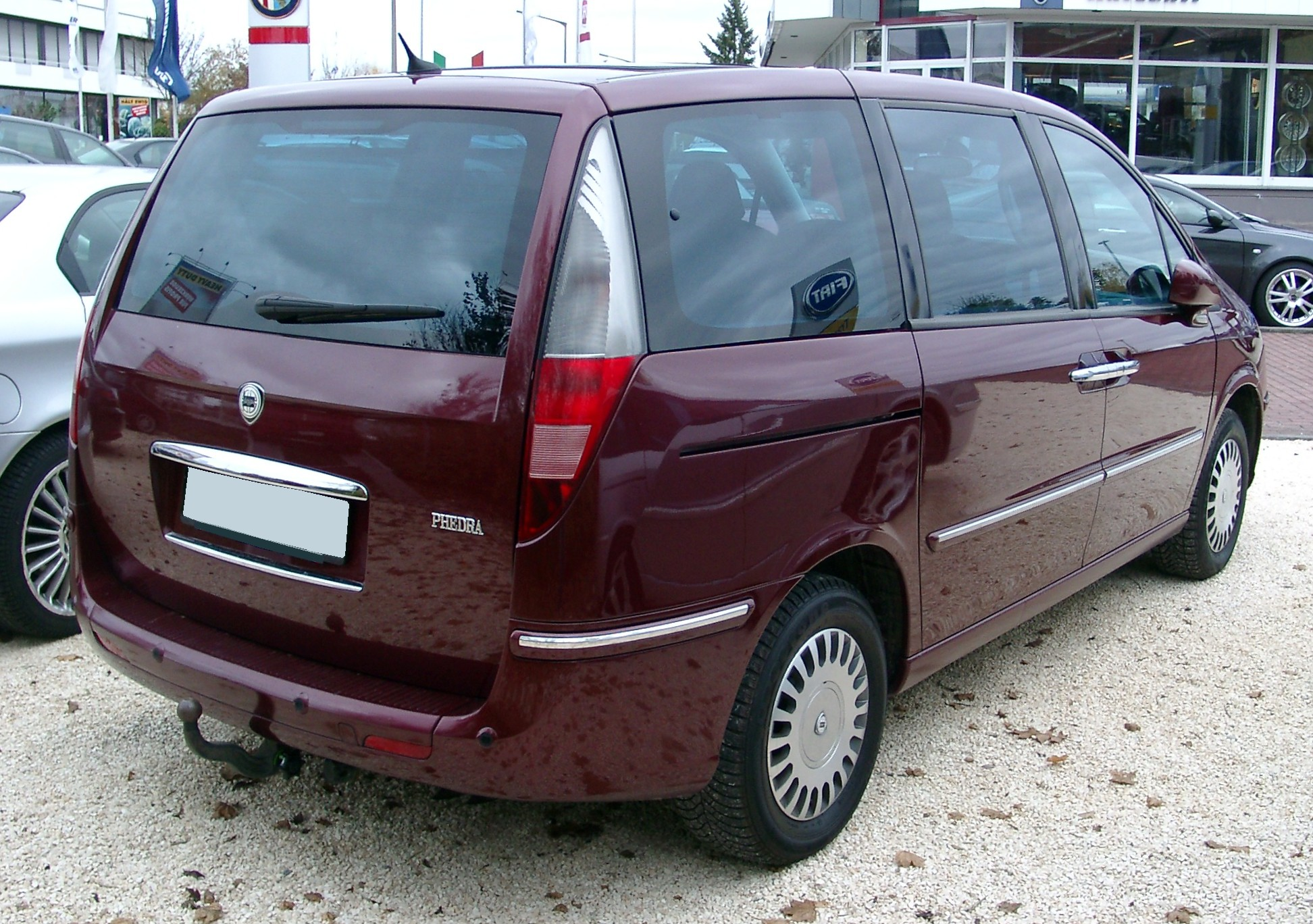
Lancia Phedra

As the new Lancias didn't use Greek letters in the 2000s (until the Lancia Delta was reintroduced in 2008), the new minivan was called Lancia Phedra, in honour of the Greek mythological figure Phaedra. The successor was the Lancia Voyager.

== Production and sales figures ==
Year	Worldwide Production				Worldwide Sales		Notes
Year	Peugeot 806 / 807	Citroën Evasion / C8	Fiat Ulysse I / II	Lancia Zeta / Phedra	807	C8	Notes
1994	10,894	7,168	9,838				
1995	29,993	10,050	15,879	3,968			
1996	20,658	12,236	20,767	3,331			
1997	22,082	14,573	20,767	3,077			
1998	19,785	17,500	21,539	2,490			
1999	22,288	18,728	24,672	3,299			
2000	22,406	17,451	10,377	2,265			
2001	19,972	17,512	6,945	1,852			
2002	14,933	11,970	9,063	5,232			
2003	35,030	27,728	14,730	10,192			
2004	31,178	24,049	13,433	7,594	31,200	TBA	
2005	28,057	22,998	8,304	5,713	27,500	TBA	
2006	23,985	20,038	5,321	4,825	24,200	20,300	
2007	20,223	11,976	4,504	4,238	21,100	12,700	
2008	13,384	8,448	2,688	4,068	13,500	8,800	
2009	6,185	5,298	1,717	1,996	7,100	5,800	
2010	5,724	5,525	888	1,561	5,700	5,500	
2011	6,376	5,731			6,345	5,540	Total 807 production reaches 185,190 units. Total C8 production reaches 143,761 units.
2012	4,190	3,721			4,500	4,100	Total 807 production reaches 189,400 units. Total C8 production reaches 147,500 units.
2013	3,721	3,790			2,788	2,760	
2014	2,670	2,726			1,714	1,586	
2015					5	12	
Total	363,734	269,216	191,413	65,681	145,652	67,098	
