= PF2 =

PF2 may refer to:

- The revised form of the Private Finance Initiative, known as PF2, in use in England and Wales between 2012 and 2018
- The PSA PF2 platform, an automobile platform developed by engineers of the automotive group PSA Peugeot Citroën.
- Pink Friday 2, 2023 album by Nicki Minaj
