= DS 5 =

Citroën hatchback

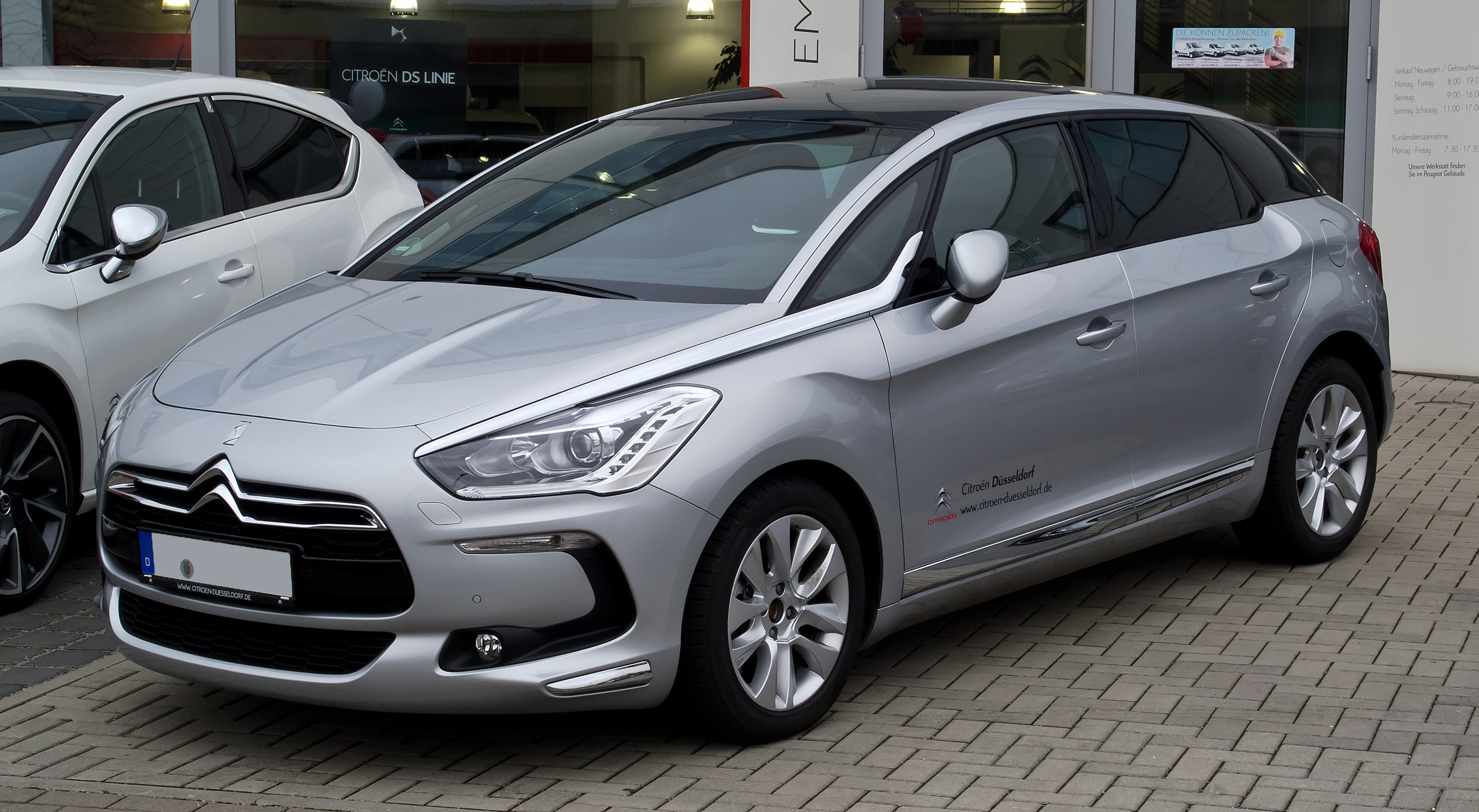

Overview
- Manufacturer: DS Automobiles (Groupe PSA)
- Also called: Citroën DS5
- Production: 2011–2018
- Assembly: France: Sochaux (PSA Sochaux Plant); China: Shenzhen (Changan PSA)
- Designer: Frédéric Soubirou (exterior)

Body and chassis
- Class: Compact executive car (D)
- Body style: 5-door hatchback
- Layout: Front-engine, front-wheel-drive or all-wheel-drive
- Platform: PSA PF2 platform
- Related: Citroën C4 Picasso; DS 6; Peugeot 3008

Powertrain
- Engine: 1.6L THP163 / THP200 GDI Turbocharged I4 (petrol); 2.0 L DW10 HDi I4 (diesel) with electric engine (HYbrid4)
- Transmission: 6 speed Auto Aisin; 6-speed automated manual

Dimensions
- Wheelbase: 2,727 mm (107.4 in)
- Length: 4,530 mm (178.3 in)
- Width: 1,871 mm (73.7 in) (2,128 mm (83.8 in) with mirrors)
- Height: 1,504 mm (59.2 in)/1,513 mm (59.6 in)
- Kerb weight: 1,500 kg (3,307 lb)

Chronology
- Predecessor: Citroën C5 (as a hatchback)
- Successor: DS N°4 (as a hatchback)

The DS 5 is a subcompact executive hatchback which was designed and developed by the French automaker Citroën, and launched in the market in Europe in November 2011. It was the third model in the premium sub brand DS. Released as the Citroën DS5, the car was relaunched as the DS 5 in 2015, following Citroën's decision to rebadge its DS models and market them under the brand DS.

== Details ==
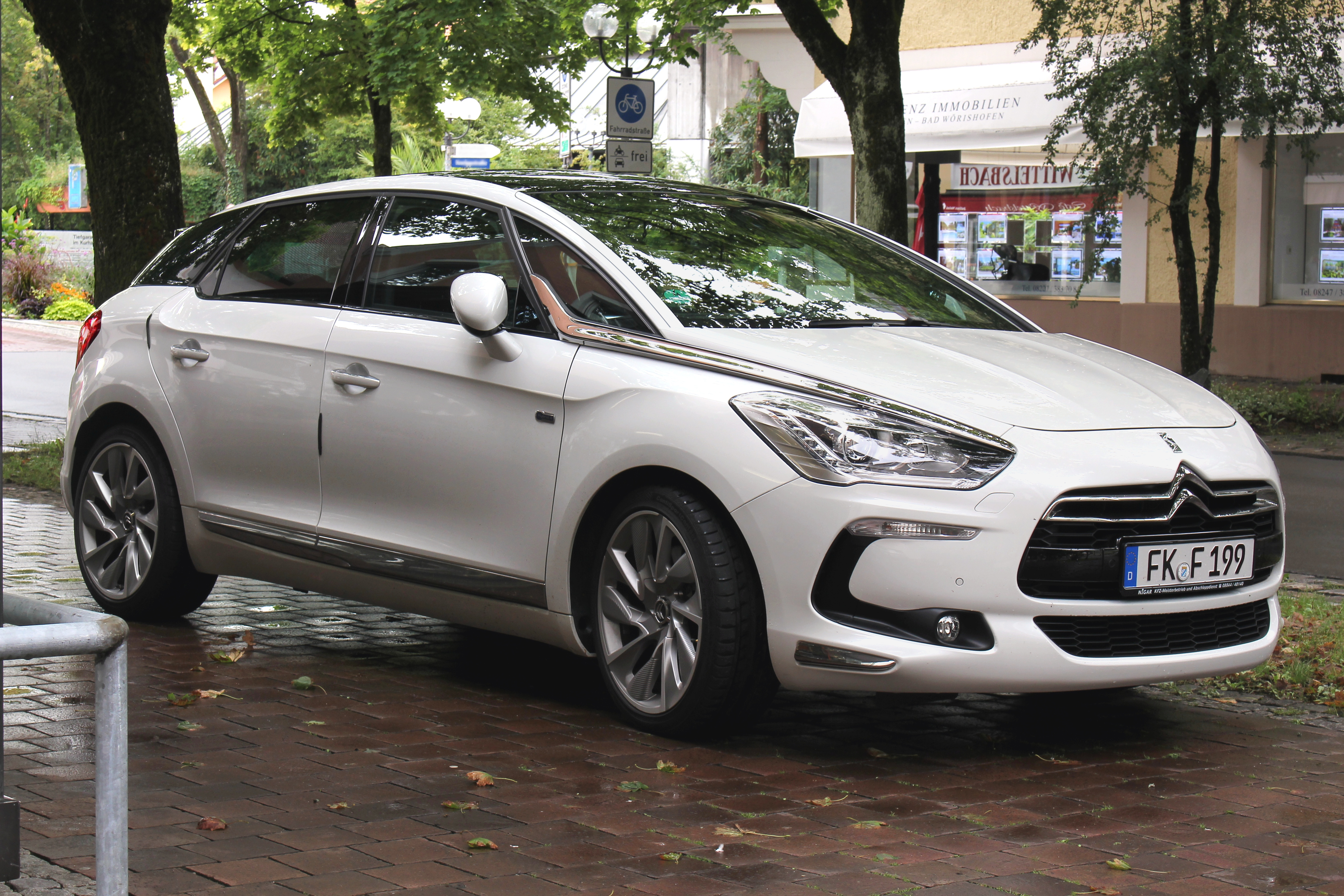
The DS 5 was initially marketed as the Citroën DS5

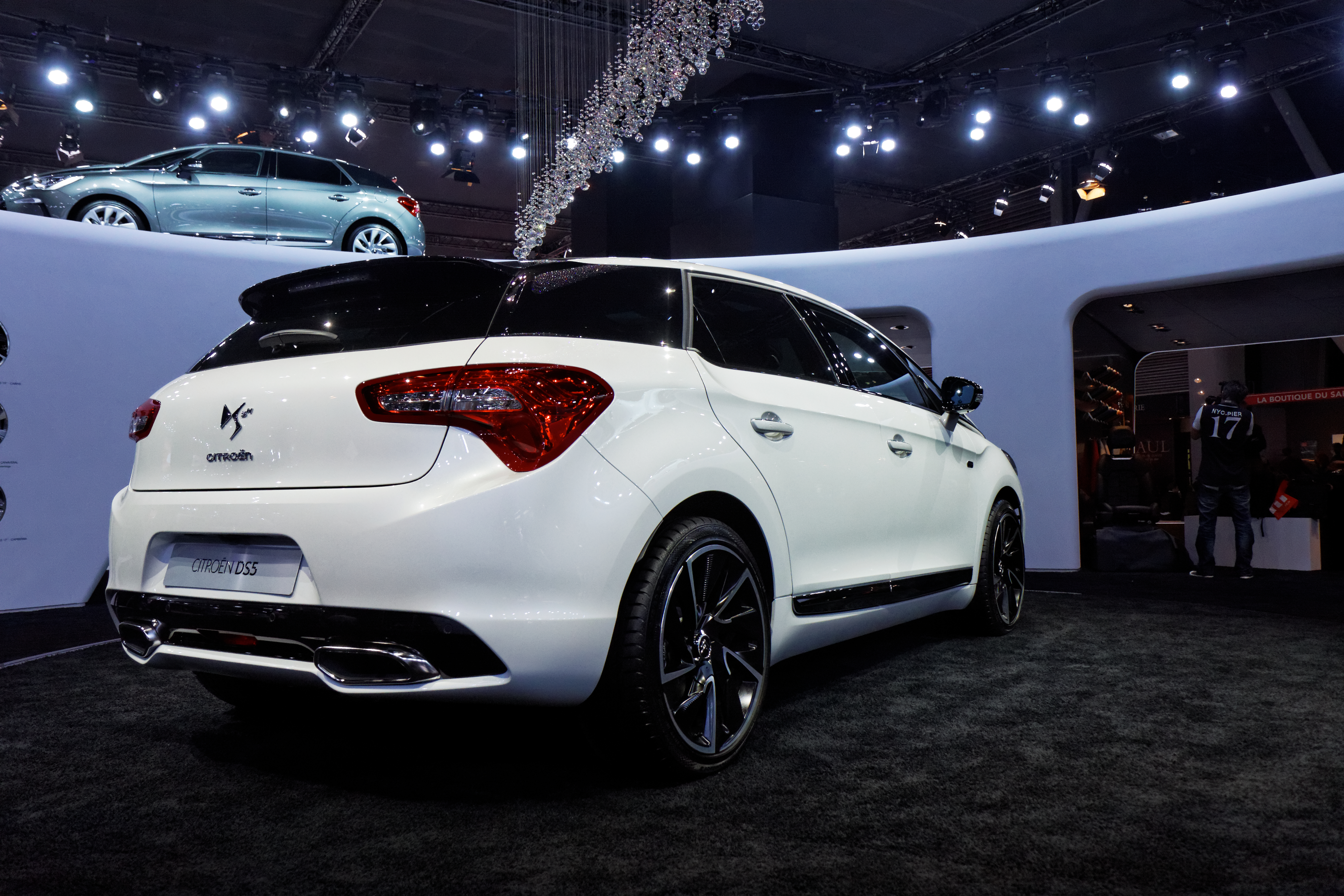
Citroën DS5

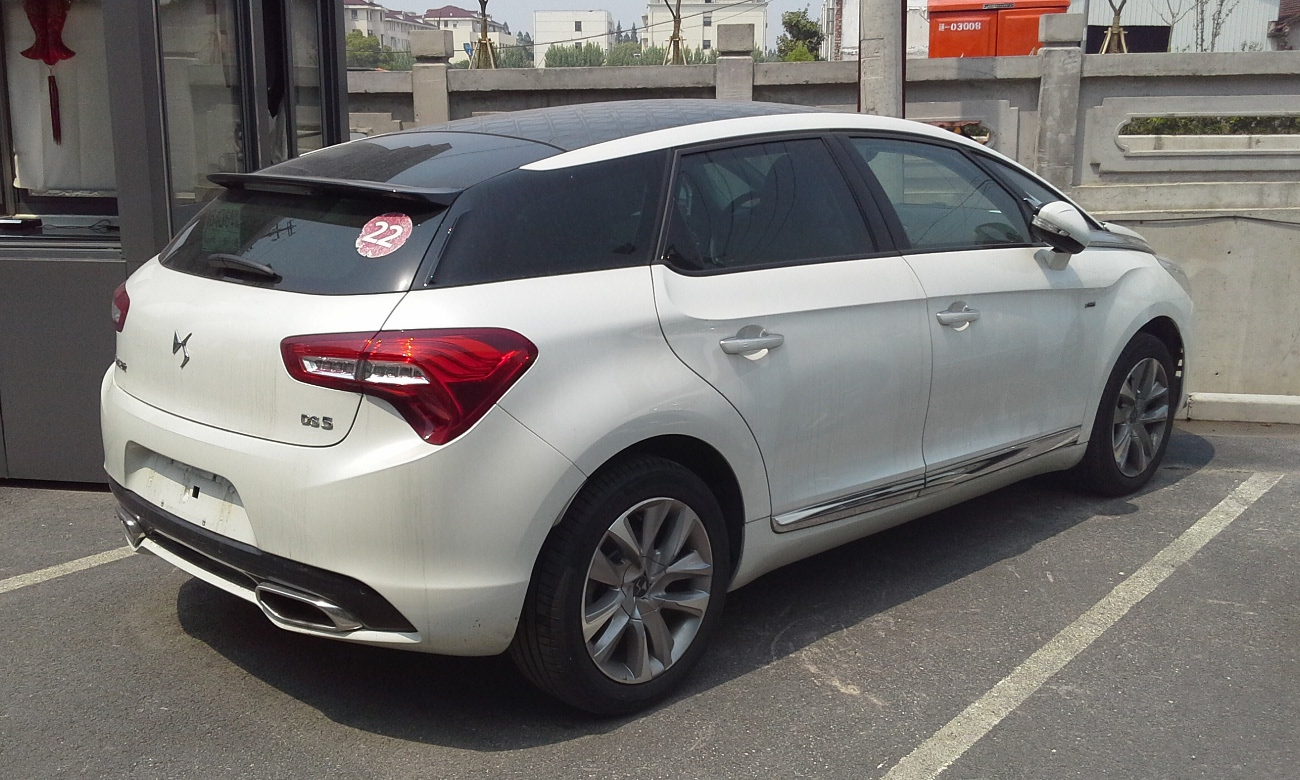
DS 5 Rear (China)

The DS5 was revealed at the 2011 Shanghai Auto Show in April 2011. Although Peugeot and Citroën products have shared platforms and principal components since the closing decades of the twentieth century, in 2011 the DS5 became the first Citroën-branded car to be assembled in Peugeot's lead European plant at Sochaux.

The DS5 mixes hatchback and estate styling, resembling a shooting-brake. It is 4,530 mm (178.3 in) long and 1,871 mm (73.7 in) wide, dimensions that are similar to those of the Lancia Delta. This is hardly a coincidence: the DS5 is based on the PF2 platform as 3008 is too, not on the C5 as its name could imply.

The DS5 fills the spot where the first generation C5 hatchback left off, as the current C5 no longer have hatchback versions. Like the original concept car, its interior is heavily aviation inspired and available with two centre consoles, one of which is located on the roof directly above the other.

With a head up display in front of the driver, the cabin is designed to resemble a jet aeroplane. Emphasising its link to aviation, and the original Citroën DS model, the carmaker partnered with the C-Forum fan club to recreate an old photoshoot of the car with a Concorde.

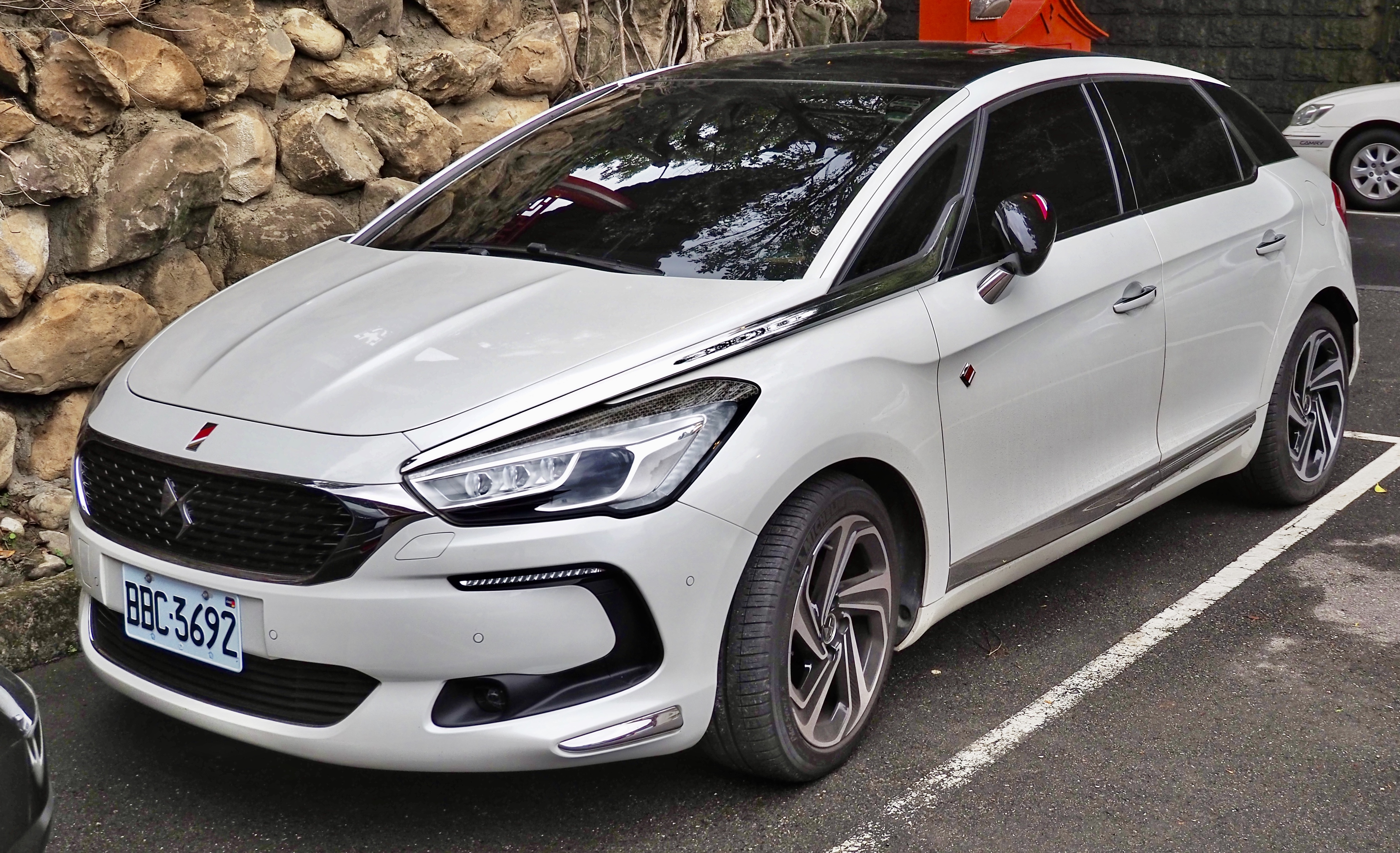
DS 5 Front (Taiwan)

Buyers can choose between a turbocharged petrol, two diesel engines and PSA's diesel-electric Hybrid4. It marries a 163 hp 2.0 HDi diesel engine with a 37 hp (28 kW) electric motor mounted on the rear axle and sends the power to all four wheels as it is needed.

Depending on trim level, this powertrain emits 99g/km or 107g/km CO_{2}, and the car can drive on electricity alone if the battery is sufficiently charged. The DS5 is the first Citroën with a hybrid drivetrain, and the first production car with a diesel electric hybrid drivetrain.

A hybrid convertible Citroën DS5 was chosen by François Hollande, for his investiture parade as President of France in May 2012.

The Citroën DS5 was relaunched as the DS 5, without Citroën badging, in 2015.

== Awards ==
- The DS5 Hybrid4 won Best Eco Car, from the Scottish Car of the Year 2012, held at Glasgow on 14 October 2012.
- The DS5 won Top Gear "Family Car of the Year 2011".

== Sales and production ==
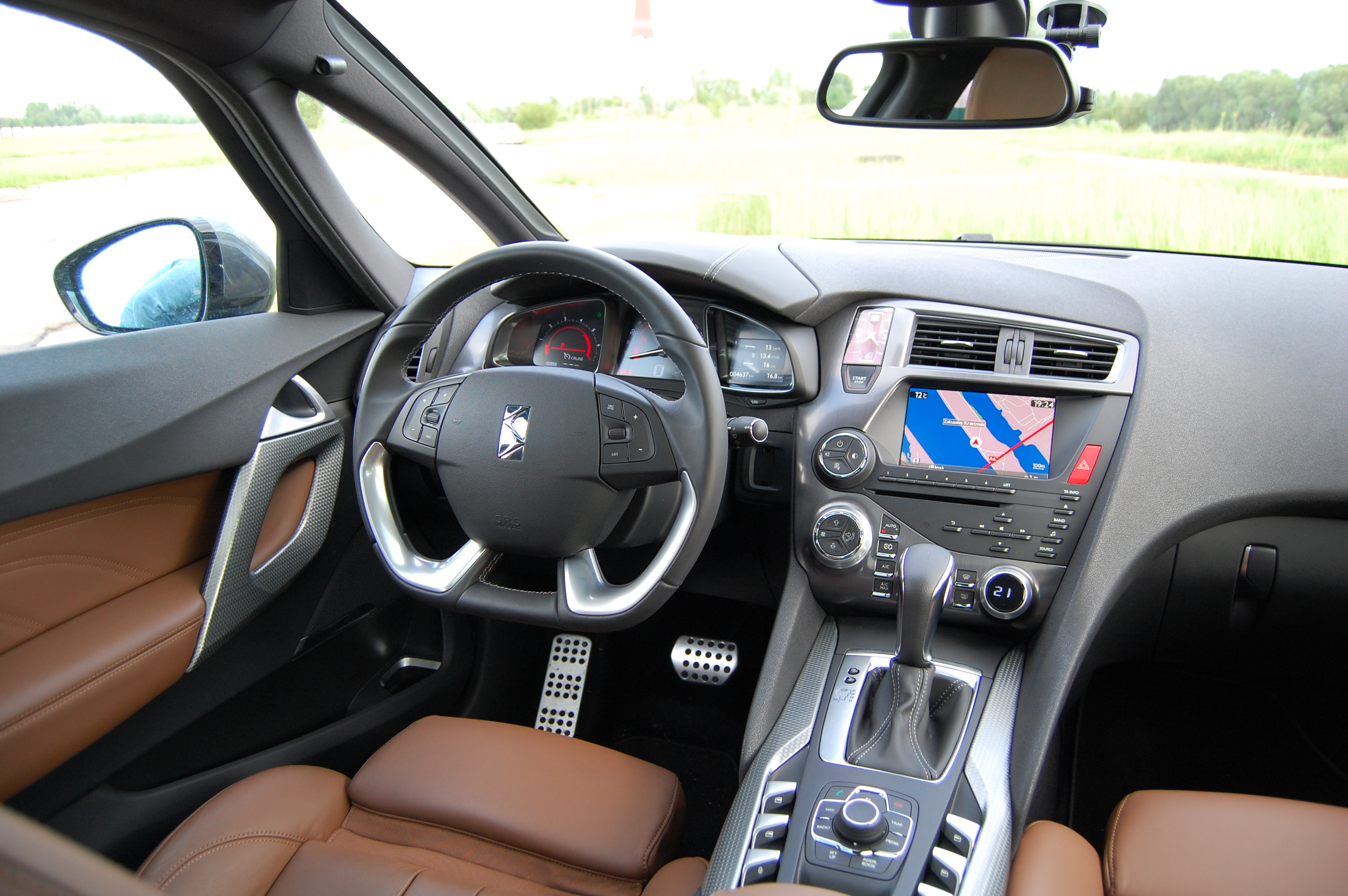
Interior

Year	Worldwide Production	Worldwide sales	Notes
2010	TBA	200	
2011	4,560	3,255	Total DS5 production reaches 4,773 units.
2012	29,700	27,800	Total DS5 production reaches 34,500 units.
2013			
2014			

== Citroën C-SportLounge ==
Citroën C-SportLounge
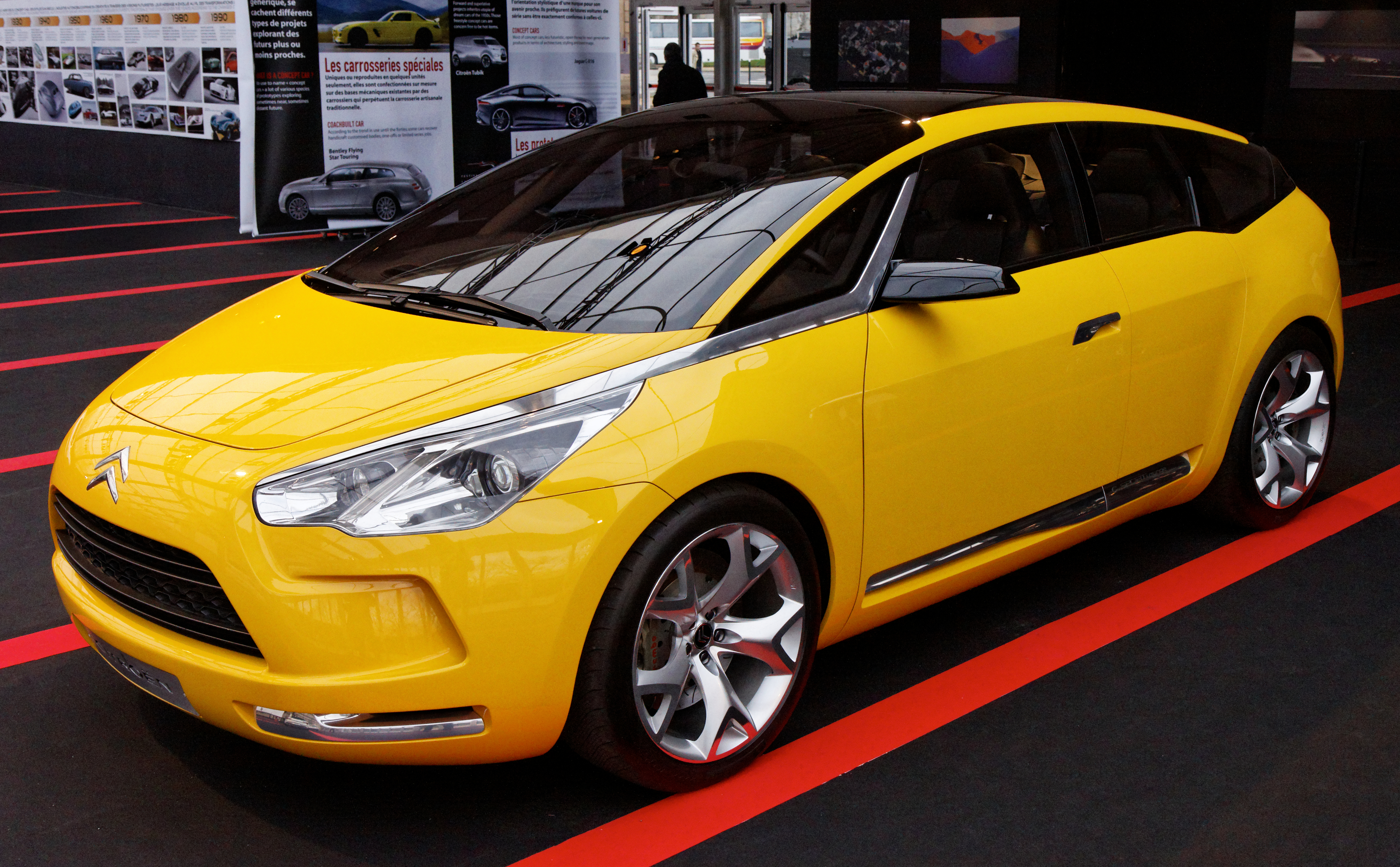

Overview
- Manufacturer: Citroën
- Production: 2005 (concept car)
- Designer: Frédéric Soubirou (exterior)

Body and chassis
- Class: Compact executive car (D)
- Body style: 5-door hatchback
- Layout: FF layout
- Platform: PSA PF2 platform

Dimensions
- Wheelbase: 2,727 mm (107.4 in)
- Length: 4,530 mm (178.3 in)
- Width: 2,128 mm (83.8 in) (with mirrors)
- Height: 1,513 mm (59.6 in)
- Curb weight: 1,500 kg (3,307 lb)

The Citroën DS5 was prefigured by the Citroën C-Sportlounge, a concept car presented by Citroën in September 2005 at the Frankfurt Motor Show, and designed by Frédéric Soubirou under Citroën design chief Jean-Pierre Ploué. The Citroën C-Sportlounge inspired the DS 5 in 2011, and has rear suicide doors, while the production car has normal-opening doors.

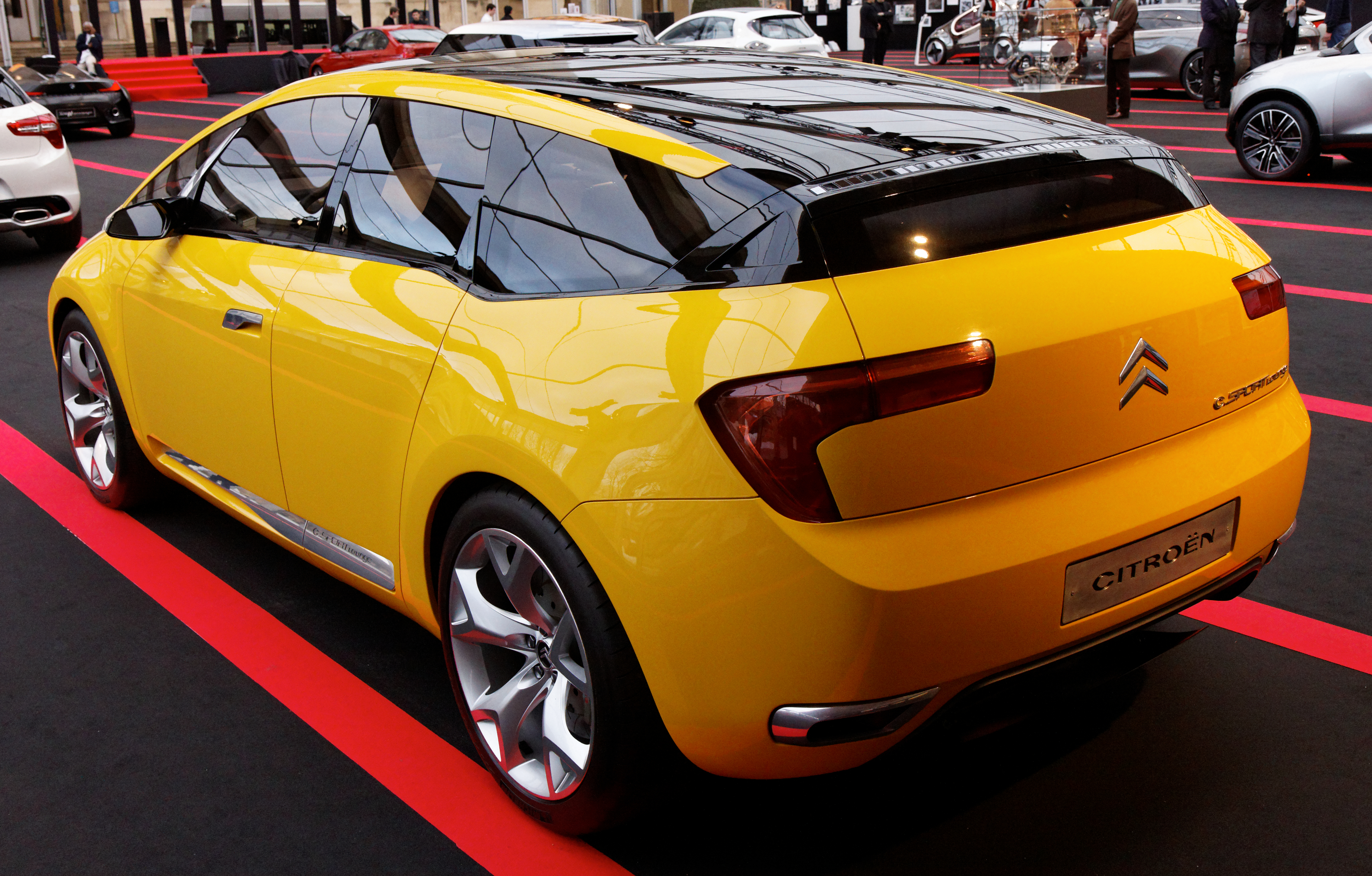
Citroën C-SportLounge rear

The C-SportLounge is a front-wheel-drive concept car that includes a 1,997 cc (121.9 cu in) engine, with a six speed automatic transmission and twenty inch alloy wheels, with 255/40 tires. Its body has a drag coefficient of 0.26 and features an interior design inspired by aeroplane cockpits.

== Safety ==
ANCAP test results Citroen DS5 all variants (2012)
Test	Score
Overall	5 /5 stars
Frontal offset	14.66/16
Side impact	16/16
Pole	2/2
Seat belt reminders	3/3
Whiplash protection	Good
Pedestrian protection	Marginal
Electronic stability control	Standard
