= DS 4 =

Compact executive car by DS Automobiles

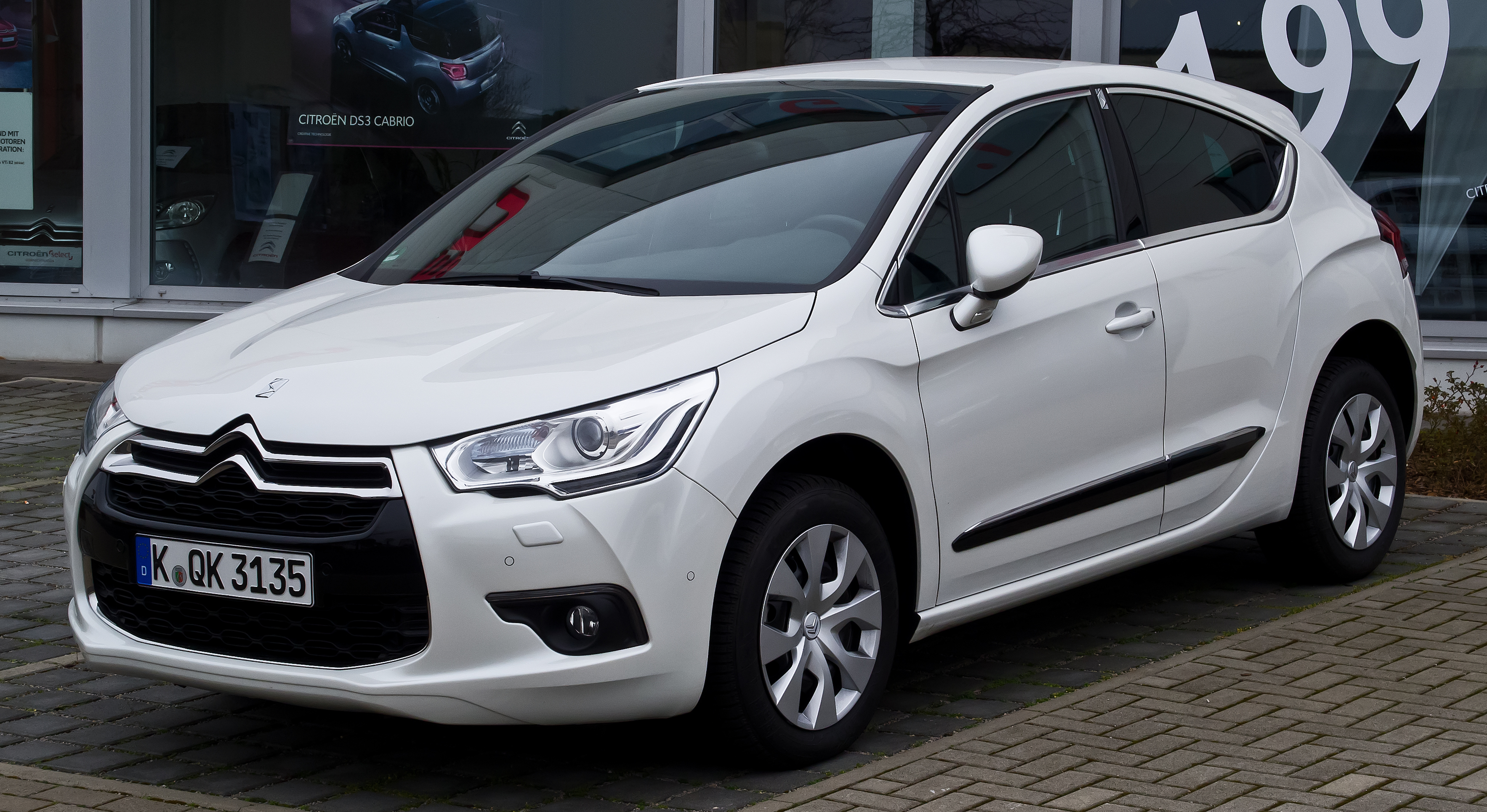
- 2014 Citroën DS4

Overview
- Manufacturer: Citroën (2010–2015); DS Automobiles (2015–2018)
- Also called: Citroën DS4 (2010–2015)
- Production: August 30, 2010–2018
- Assembly: France: Mulhouse (PSA Mulhouse Plant); Malaysia: Gurun (NAM)
- Designer: Olivier Vincent

Body and chassis
- Platform: PSA PF2 platform
- Related: Citroën C4 II

Powertrain
- Engine: Petrol: 1.6 L VTi I4; 1.6 L THP Turbo I4; Diesel: 1.6 L HDi/e-HDI/BlueHDI TD I4; 2.0 L HDi/e-HDI/BlueHDI I4
- Transmission: 5-speed manual 6-speed manual 6-speed ETG6 automated manual 6-speed EAT6 automatic

Dimensions
- Wheelbase: 2,612 mm (102.8 in)
- Length: 4,275 mm (168.3 in)
- Width: 1,810 mm (71.3 in)
- Height: 1,523 mm (60.0 in)
- Kerb weight: 1,360–1,496 kg (2,998–3,298 lb)

Chronology
- Predecessor: Citroën C4 Coupé
- Successor: DS 4S; DS 4 II (now DS N°4); Citroën C4 (2020)

The DS 4 is a compact hatchback, and it is the second model in the luxury DS sub-brand created by Citroën, now an independent brand. Starting in 2021, it is currently in its second generation, which is based on an all-new EMP2 platform shared with the Opel Astra L and Peugeot 308 III. As of 2023, it is currently slotted above the DS 3 and below the DS 7 Crossback.

== Overview ==
Based upon the Citroën C4 II, the first generation was officially launched internationally in March 2011, but already on sale in some countries by the end of 2010. It features raised suspension to resemble a compact SUV and repositioned door handles to give it a coupé like silhouette.

The rear windows are fixed, and do not slide down or open outwards.

At launch, the petrol engines that powered the DS 4 were all a product of a collaboration between PSA and BMW, all being 1,598 cc four-cylinder, 16 valve units. The base VTi 120 was normally aspirated and put out 120 PS (88 kW). As its name implies it came with variable valve timing. The next engine up was the THP 155, essentially a turbocharged version of the VTi.

It put out 156 PS (115 kW) thanks to a twin-scroll turbocharger and dual overhead cams, and used a six-speed manual transmission. The most powerful engine option was the THP 200, a variation of the THP 155, but with an output of 200 PS (147 kW). Citroën initially offered two diesel engines in the DS 4 – the HDi 110, a 1,560 cc four-cylinder that put out 112 PS (82 kW) and the four-cylinder HDi 160 also found in the sedan Citroën C5. There was also a 2.0-litre diesel displacing 1,997 cc and producing 163 PS (120 kW).

The engine line up differs significantly. The DS 4 is available with Start&Stop technology and Citroën says that the battery has been optimised to withstand up to 600,000 starting cycles. The boot is 385 L (13.6 cu ft) and expand to 1,021 L (36.1 cu ft) with the back seats folded down. The DS 4's styling has been very well received by the international press.

It was elected Most Beautiful Car of the Year at the International Automobile Festival, beating BMW’s new F10 5 Series and Honda's new CR-Z hybrid car. German magazine Auto Bild, and its partner magazines throughout Europe, have given it first prize for design, in its category in the contest Design Award. Production of the DS 4 ended in April 2018.

=== 2015 facelift ===
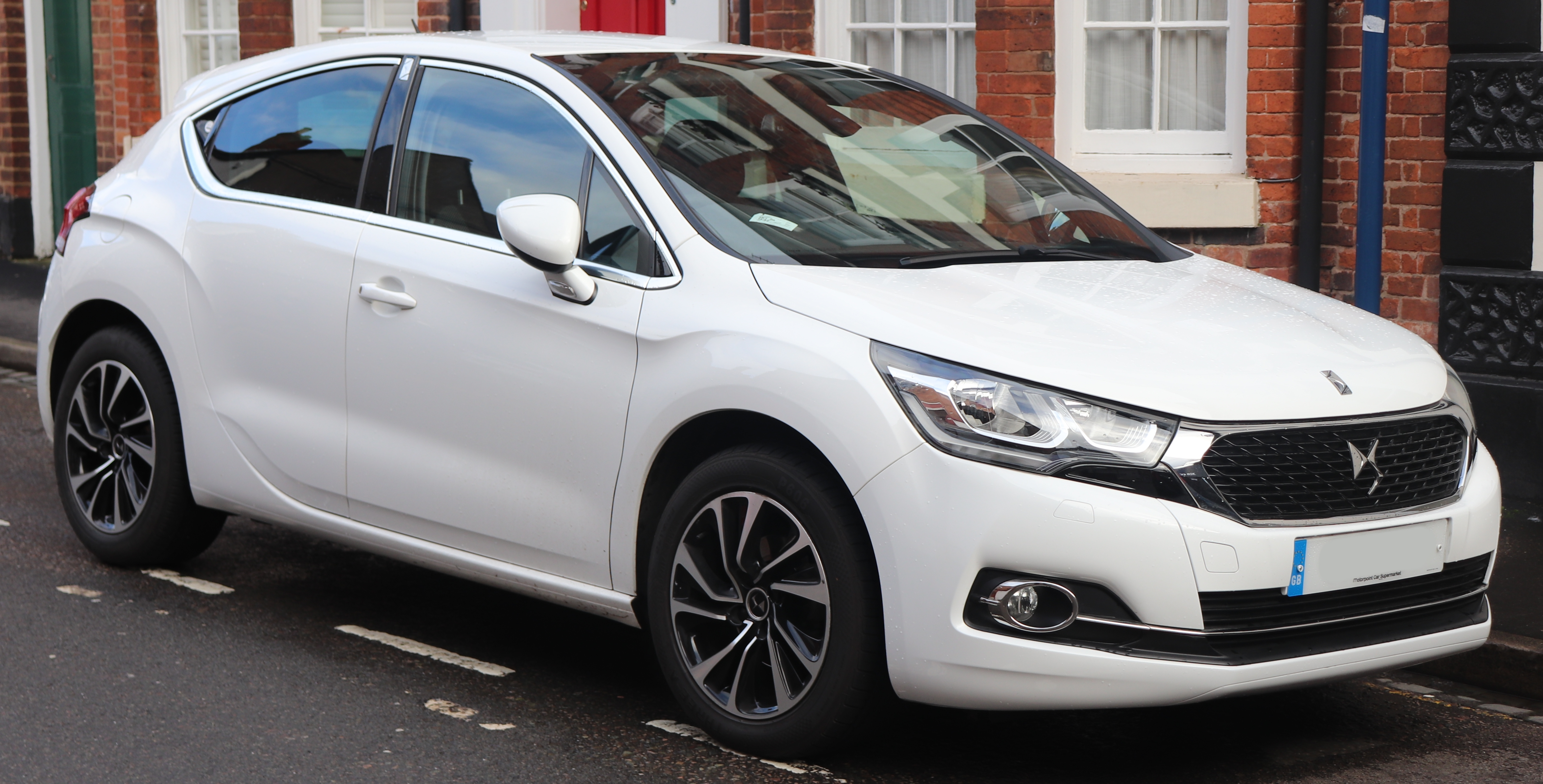
DS 4 Elegance

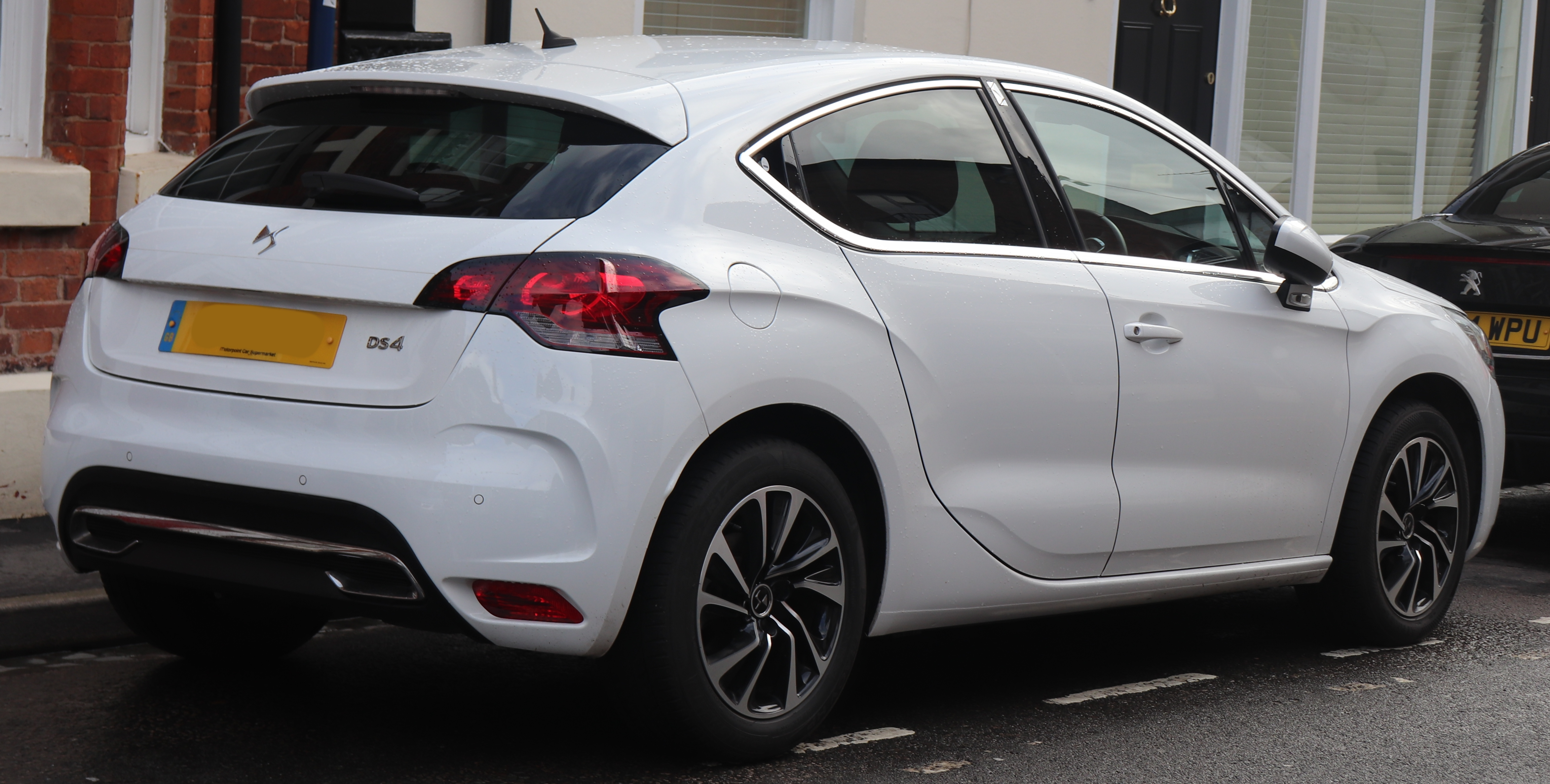
DS 4 Elegance

In August 2015, the facelifted DS 4 was announced by DS Automobiles, as part of their separation from Citroën to become a standalone brand. The revised model no longer featured Citroën badges, with the 'DS Wings' grille design. The facelift also introduces the DS 4 Crossback variation, fitted with large black wheels, wheel arch trims and roof bars.

The interior has been refined with door panels upholstered in Nappa leather while the seats are upholstered in semi-aniline leather featuring a signature 'watch-strap' design. The DS 4 also features a panoramic windscreen offering 45 degree upward vision for greater visibility while both the driver and passenger have rigid individual blinds and folding sun shields.

Petrol engines included a 96 kW (131 PS) and 230 Nm 1.2-litre engine mated to a 6-speed transmission which was available on the hatchback and Crossback versions and a 121 kW (165 PS) and 240 Nm 1,6-litre engine mated to a 6-speed automatic transmission. There was also a 1.6-litre engine offering 155 kW (211 PS) and 285 Nm of torque, only be available for the DS4 hatchback. Diesel engines includes a 88 kW (120 PS) and 300 Nm 1.6-litre engine mated to either a 6-speed manual or 6-speed automatic transmission for both the hatchback and Crossback versions. There's also a 110 kW (150 PS) and 370 Nm 2.0-litre diesel engine mated to a 6-speed manual transmission which is only available for the DS 4 hatchback. The diesel range is completed with a 2.0-litre diesel engine that offers 132 kW (179 PS) and 400 Nm of torque and is only available with a 6-speed automatic.

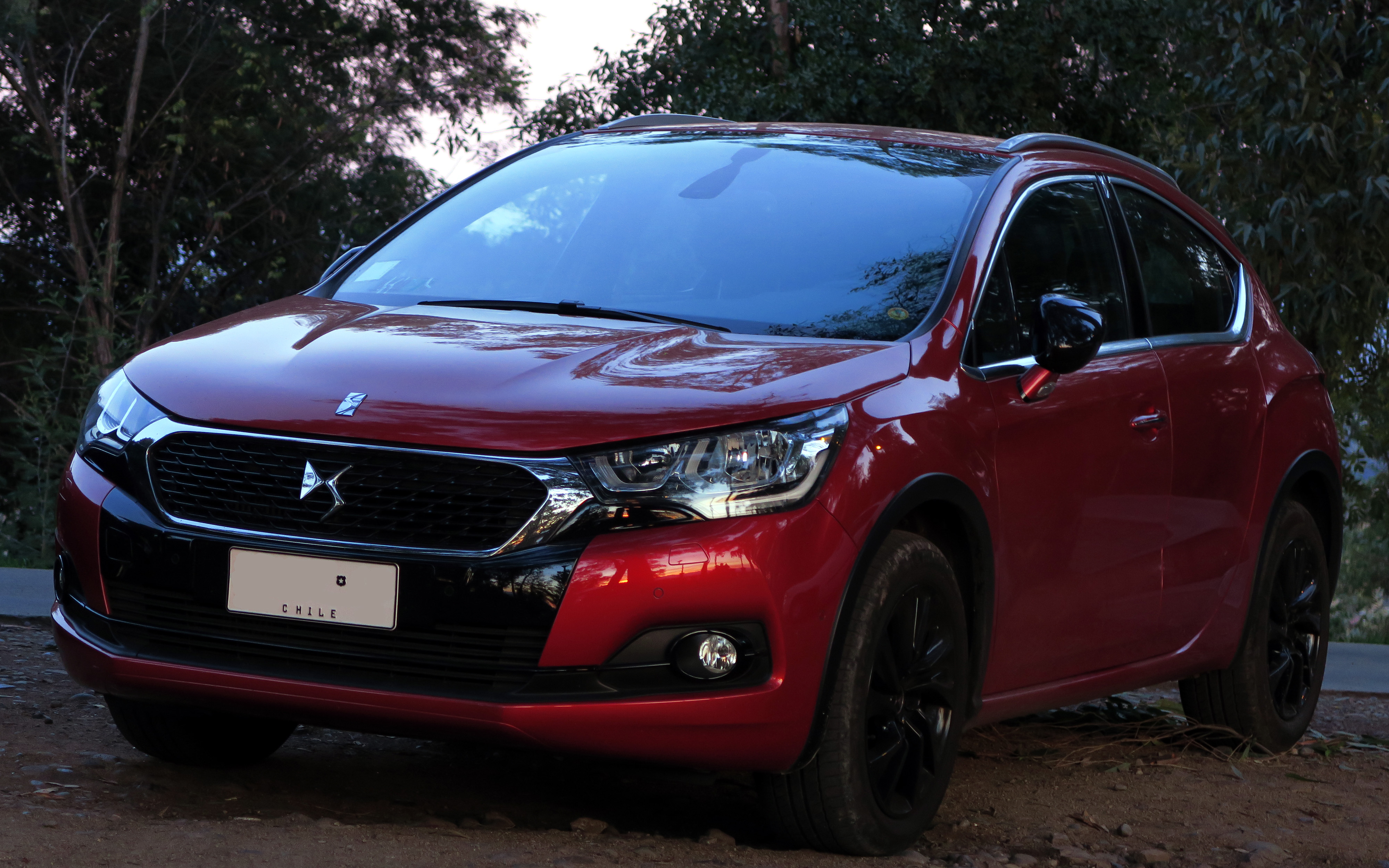
DS 4 Crossback

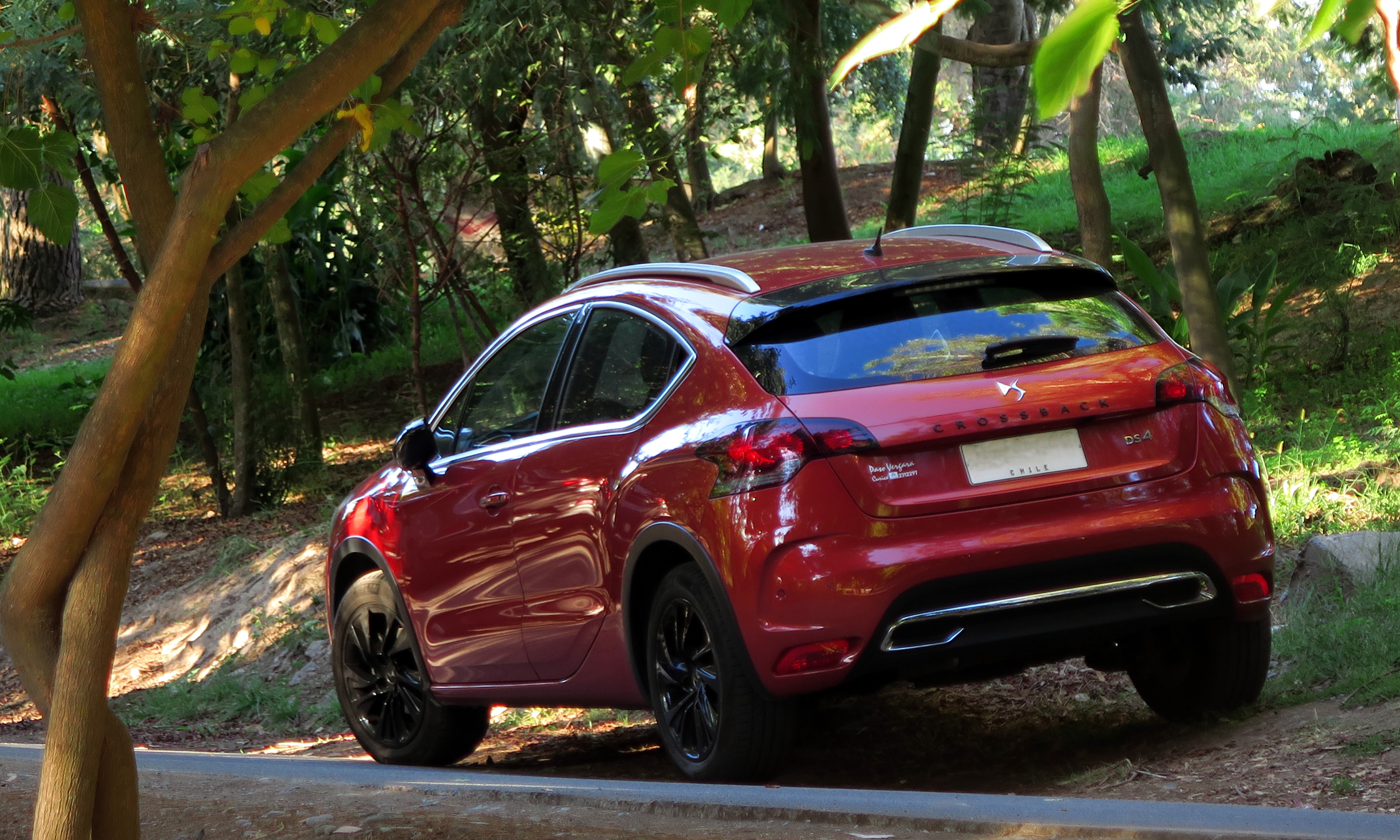
DS 4 Crossback

=== Safety ===
ANCAP test results Citroen DS4 (2012)
| Test | Score |
|---|---|
| Overall | 5 /5 stars |
| Frontal offset | 14.68/16 |
| Side impact | 16/16 |
| Pole | 2/2 |
| Seat belt reminders | 3/3 |
| Whiplash protection | Good |
| Pedestrian protection | Marginal |
| Electronic stability control | Standard |

Euro NCAP test results Citroën DS 4 1.6 VTi base grade (LHD) (2011)
| Test | Points | % |
|---|---|---|
| Overall: | 5 /5 stars | |
| Adult occupant: | 32 | 90% |
| Child occupant: | 39 | 80% |
| Pedestrian: | 15 | 43% |
| Safety assist: | 7 | 97% |

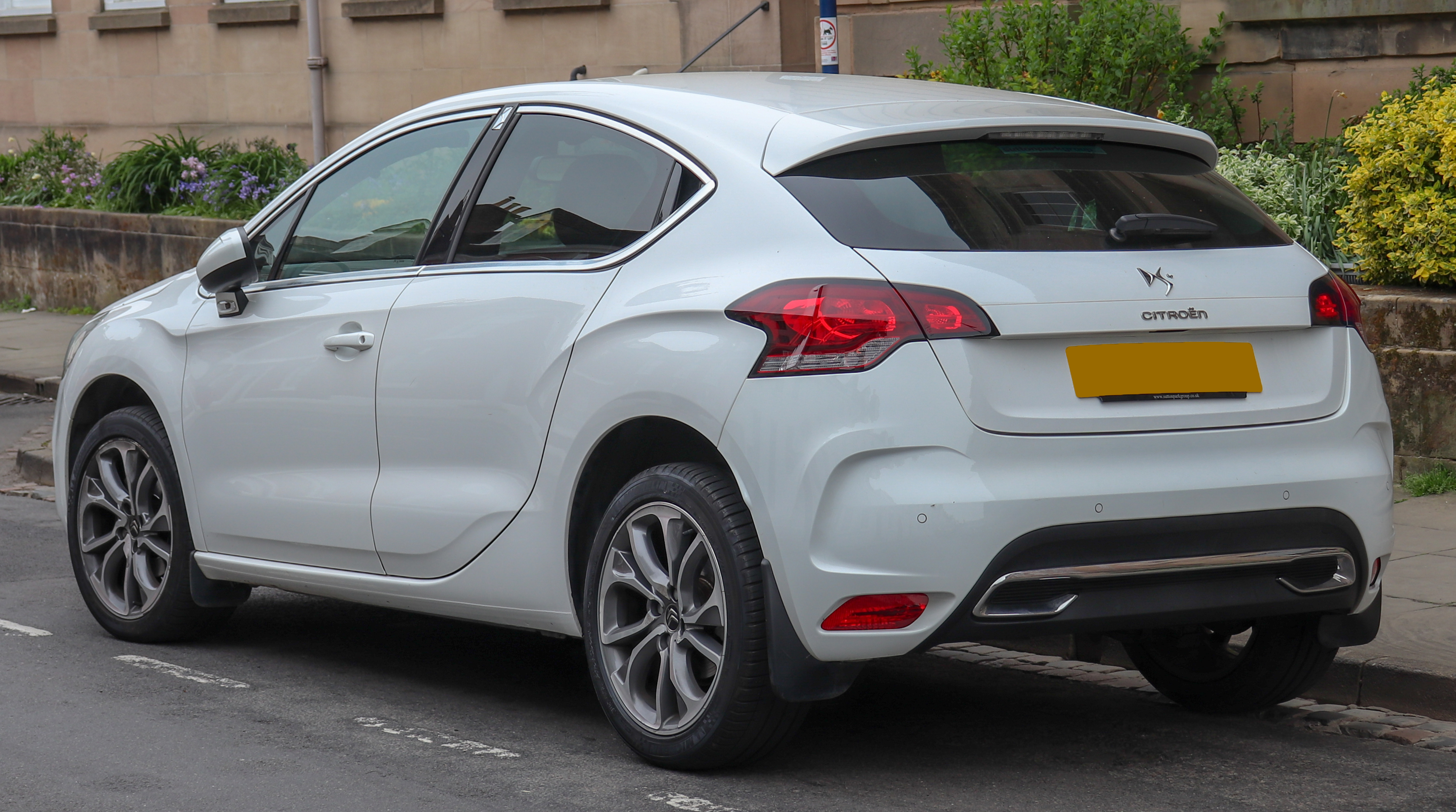
Citroen DS4 (rear)

The European New Car Assessment Programme (Euro NCAP) (Europe’s rough equivalent to the United States’s IIHS) gave the DS4 one five-star rating overall. The Peugeot 508 was scored the same, with the only difference being a higher child occupant rating in the 508, and slightly higher pedestrian impact rating for the DS4.

=== Engines ===
Engines
| | Petrol engines | | | Diesel engines | | |
|---|---|---|---|---|---|---|
| | 1.6 VTi | 1.6 THP 155 | 1.6 THP 200 | 1.6 HDi | 1.6 e HDi | 2.0 HDi |
| Production years | | | | | | |
| Engine Type | I4 16V naturally aspirated | I4 16V turbocharged | | I4 8V common rail injection | | I4 16V common rail injection |
| Displacement (cc) | 1598 | 1598 | 1598 | 1560 | 1560 | 1997 |
| Max power at r/min | 88 kW (120 PS; 118 hp); 6000 | 115 kW (156 PS; 154 hp); 6000 | 147 kW (200 PS; 197 hp); 5800 | 82 kW (111 PS; 110 hp); 3600 | 82 kW (111 PS; 110 hp); 3600 | 120 kW (163 PS; 161 hp); 3750 |
| Max torque at r/min | 160 N⋅m (118 lb⋅ft); 4250 | 240 N⋅m (177 lb⋅ft); 1400 | 275 N⋅m (203 lb⋅ft); 1700 | 270 N⋅m (199 lb⋅ft); 1750 | 270 N⋅m (199 lb⋅ft); 1750 | 340 N⋅m (251 lb⋅ft); 2000 |
| Transmission | 5 speed manual | 6 speed EGS | 6 speed manual | 6 speed manual | 6 speed EMG | 6 speed manual |
| Weight | 1,360 kg (2,998 lb) | 1,420 kg (3,131 lb) | 1,431 kg (3,155 lb) | 1,417 kg (3,124 lb) | 1,428 kg (3,148 lb) | 1,496 kg (3,298 lb) |
| Top speed | 193 km/h (120 mph) | 214 km/h (133 mph) | 235 km/h (146 mph) | 190 km/h (118 mph) | 190 km/h (118 mph) | 212 km/h (132 mph) |
| 0–100 km/h acceleration (0–62 mph) (s) | 10.8 | 9.0 | 7.9 | 11.3 | 11.3 | 8.6 |
| Fuel consumption (L/100 km) (urban) (extra urban) | 6.2; 8.3; 5.0 | 6.5; 9.0; 5.1 | 6.4; 8.4; 5.2 | 4.7; 5.9; 4.0 | 4.4; 4.8; 4.1 | 5.1; 6.6; 4.3 |
| CO_{2} emissions (g/km) | 144 | 149 | 149 | 122 | 114 | 134 |

== Production and sales ==
| Year | Worldwide Production | Worldwide sales |
| 2010 | 300 | 200 |
| 2011 | 34,593 | 29,477 |
| 2012 | 30,700 | 33,157 |
| 2013 | | 29,802 |
| 2014 | | 21,643 |
| 2015 | | 18,825 |
| 2016 | | 19,938 |
| 2017 | | 12,257 |
| 2018 | | 5,381 |
