= PSA PF2 platform =

Automobile platform for medium-sized cars by PSA Peugeot Citroën

The PF2 Platform is an automobile platform developed by engineers of the French automotive group PSA Peugeot Citroën. The platform is designed for medium cars with front wheel drive or four wheel drive coupled with electric engine and transverse engine. The first application using the PF2 platform is the 2001 Peugeot 307.

The platform was phased out in 2013 with the replacement PSA EMP2 platform, which merges the PF2 and PF3 platforms into one new modular system.

== Models ==
Vehicles based on the PF2 Platform:

- Regular
  - 2001–2008 Peugeot 307, essentially mix of 306/Xsara/ZX and PF2 platform
  - 2004–2010 Citroën C4
  - 2007–2013 Peugeot 308
  - 2009–2016 Peugeot 3008
  - 2009–2012 Citroën C4 Sedan (C-Quatre)
  - 2010–2015 Peugeot RCZ
  - 2010–2018 Citroën C4 II
  - 2011–2018 Citroën DS4
  - 2015–2018 DS 4
  - 2016–2018 DS 4 Crossback
  - 2016–2018 DongFeng H30 Cross
  - 2014–2020 DS 6 (China)
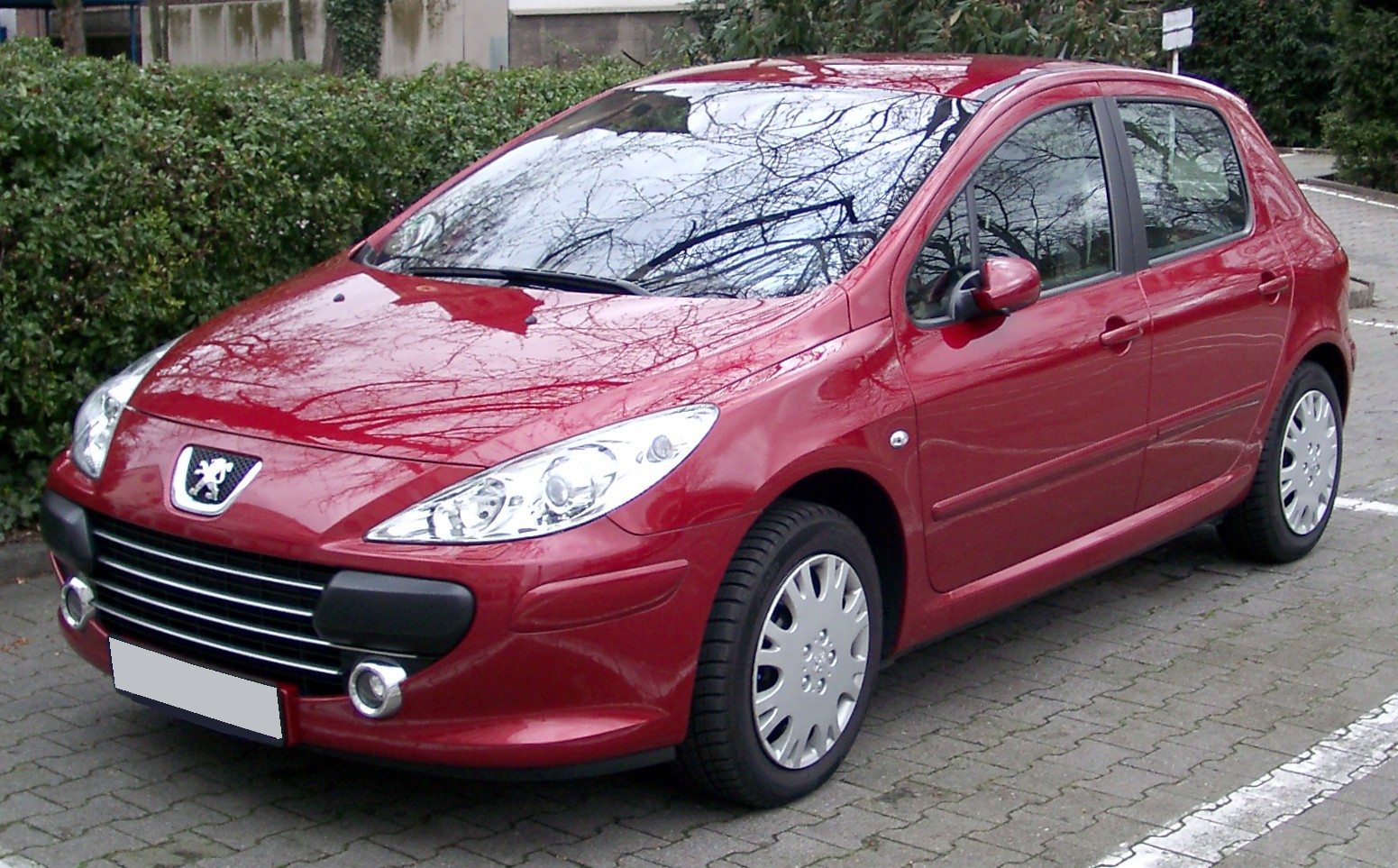
Peugeot 307

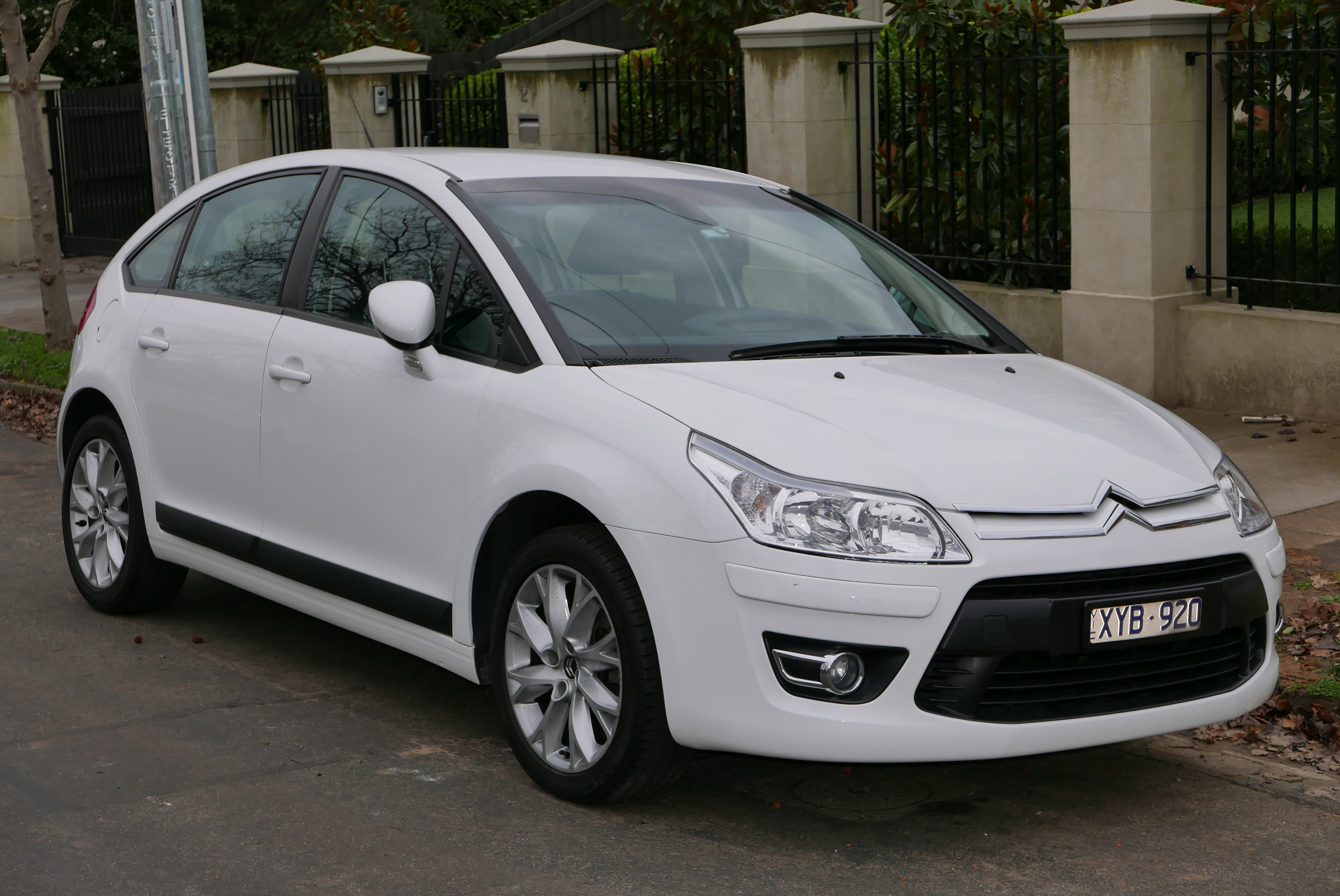
Citroën C4

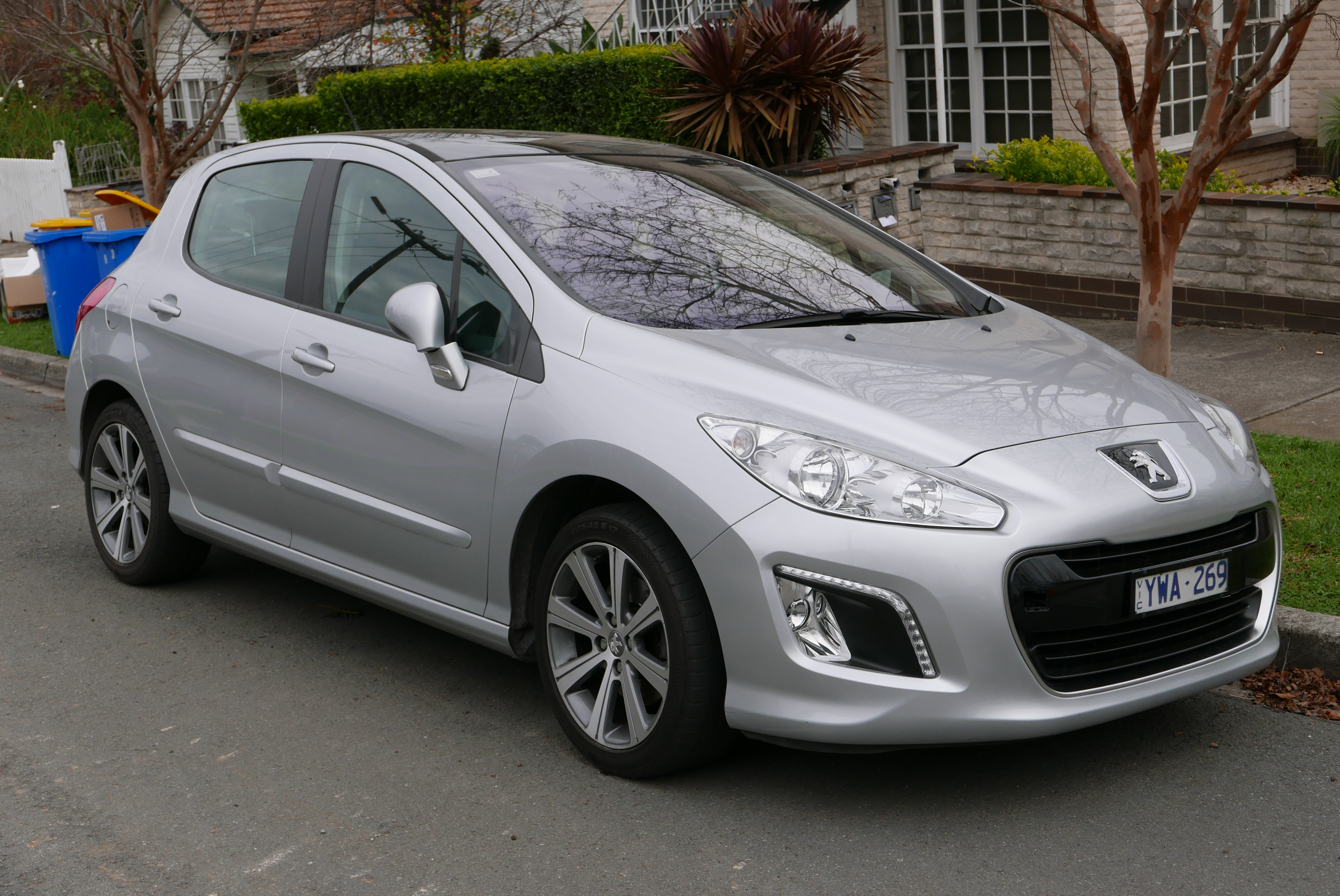
Peugeot 308

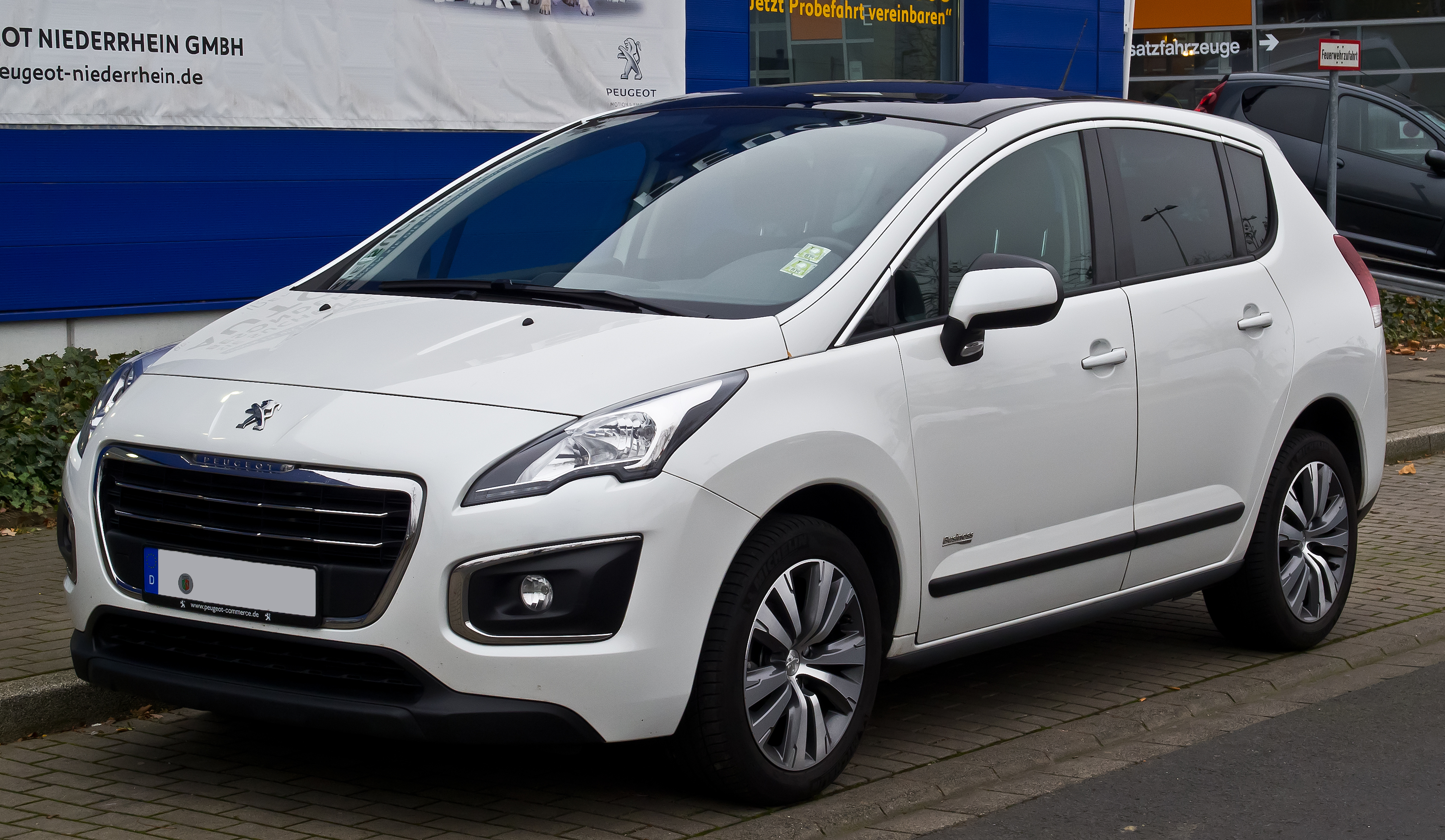
Peugeot 3008

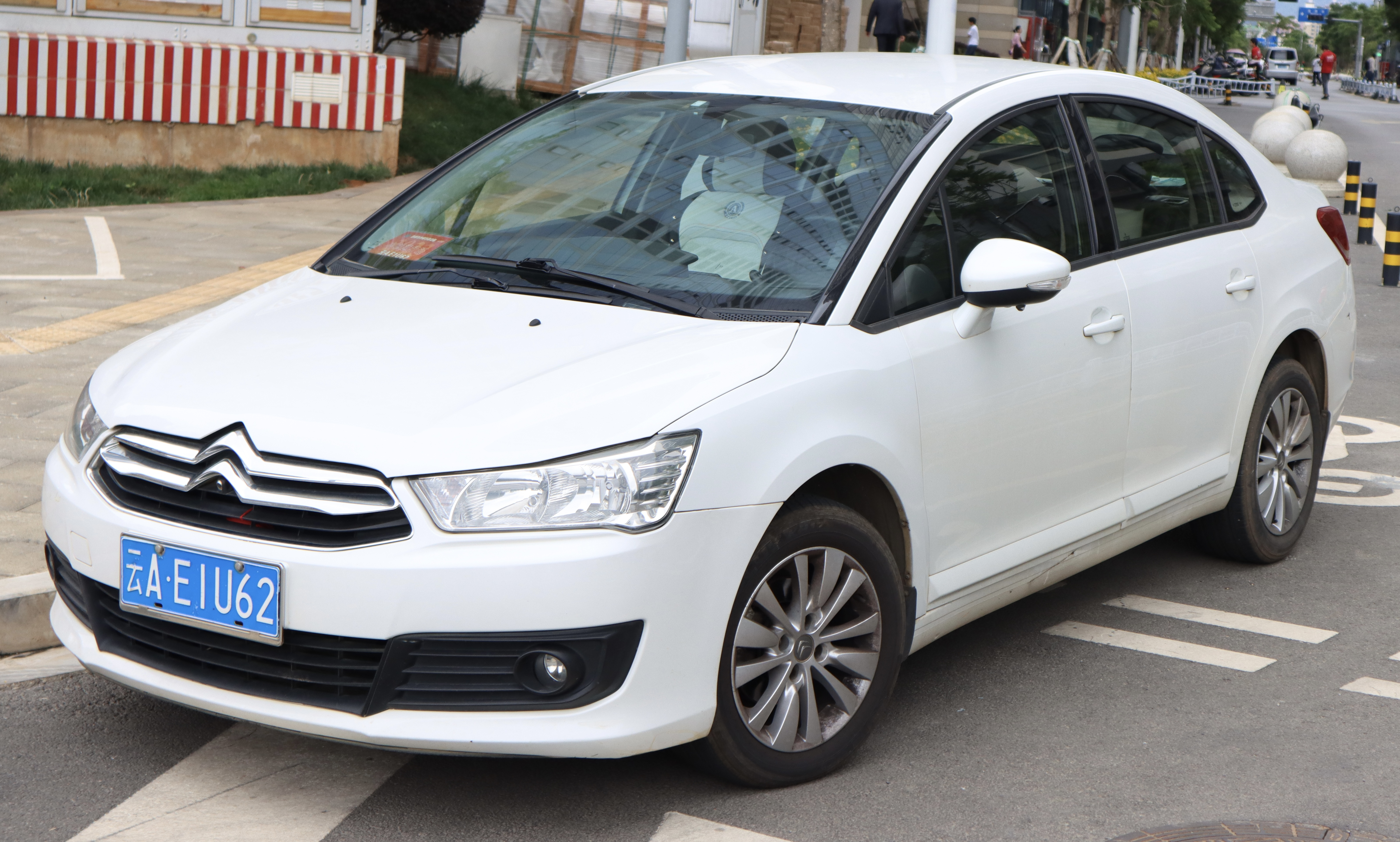
Citroën C4 Sedan (C-Quatre)

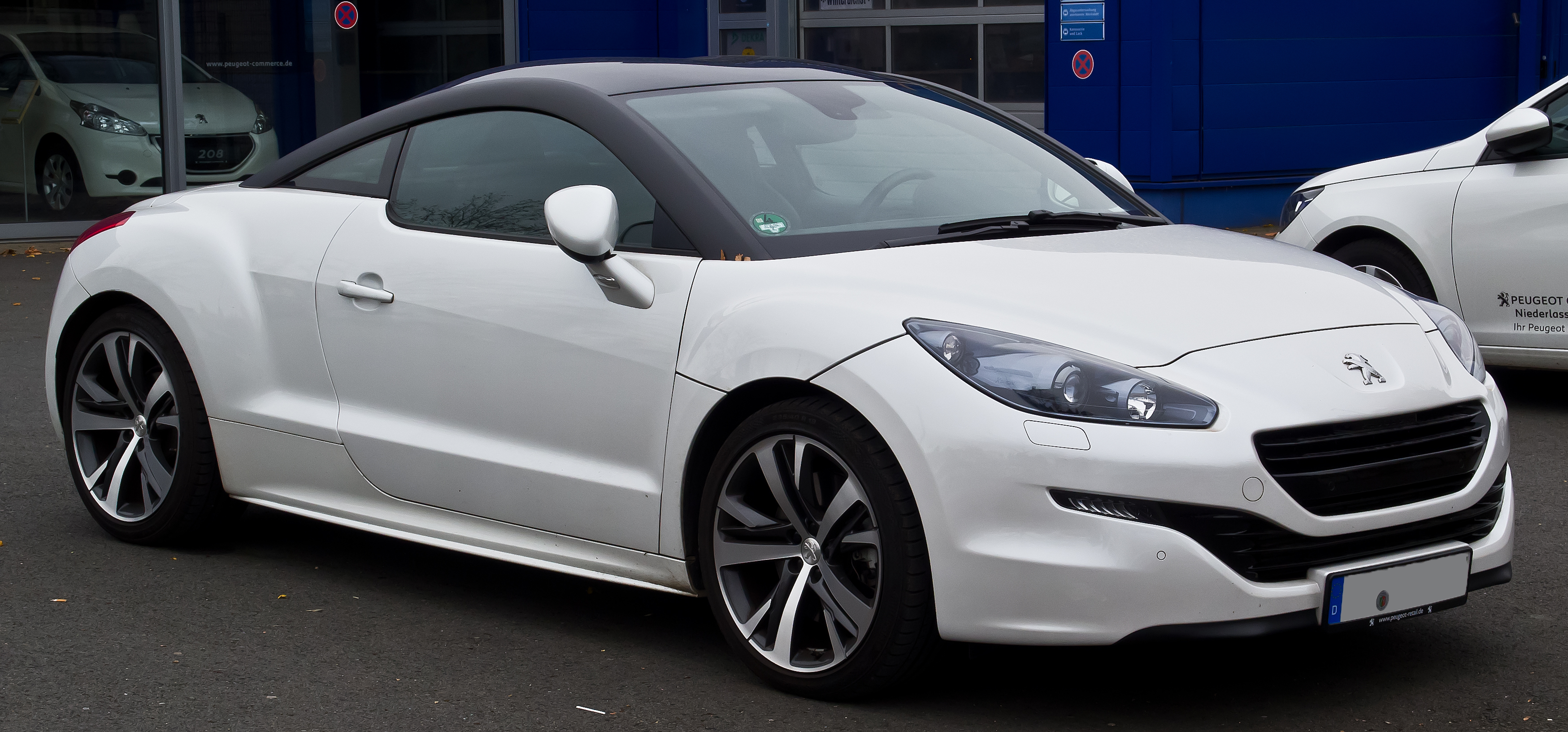
Peugeot RCZ

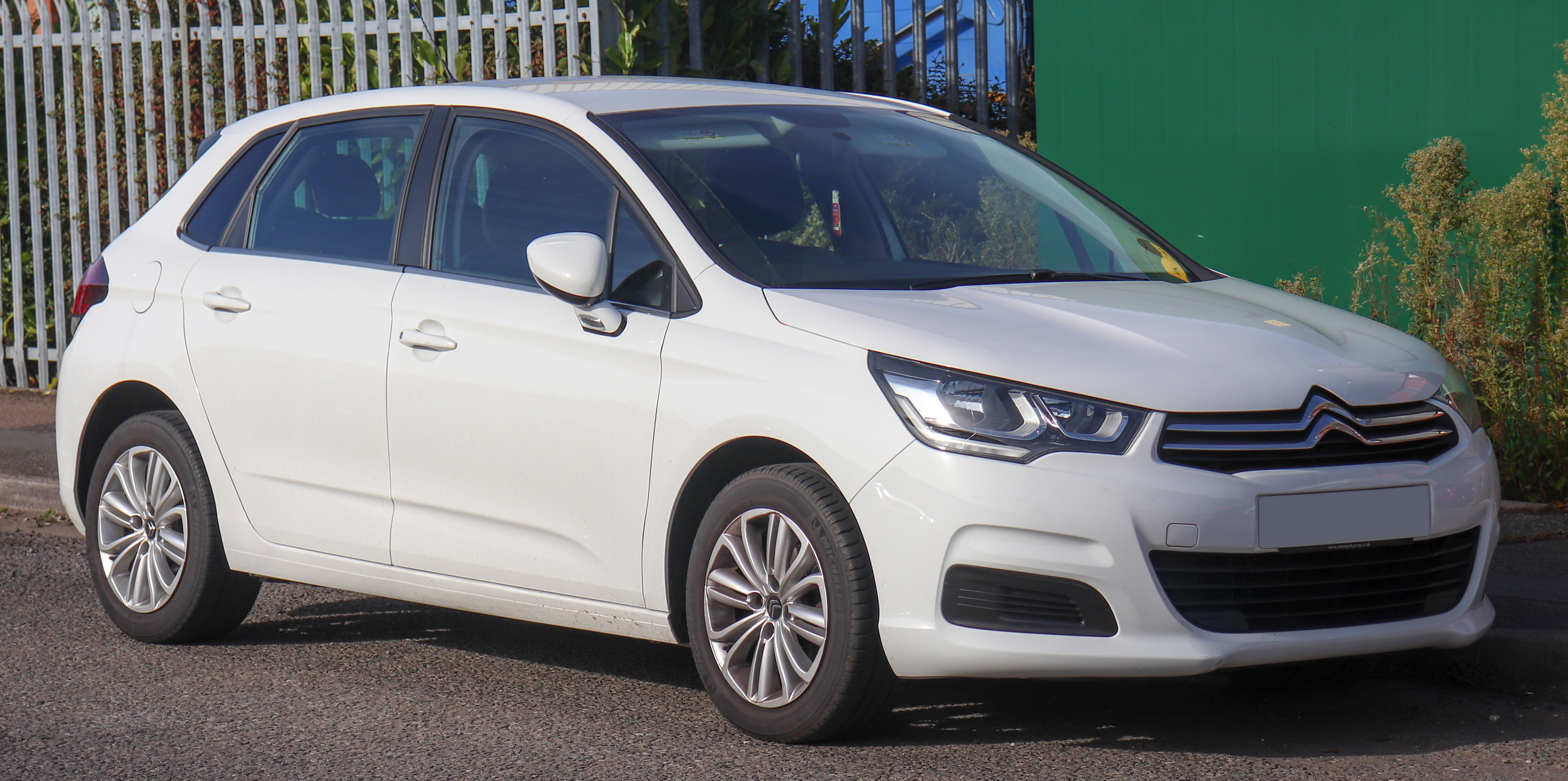
Citroën C4 II

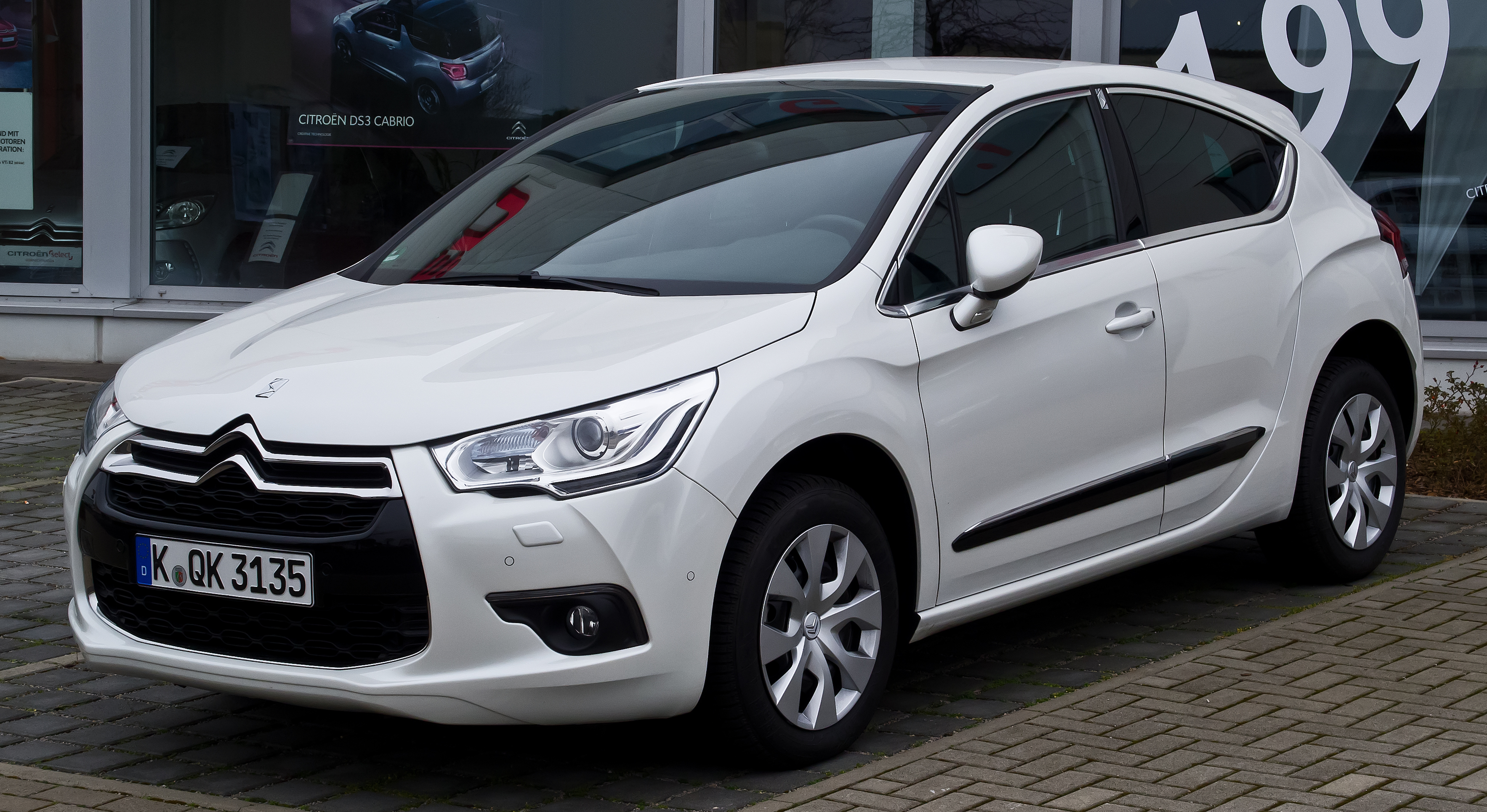
Citroën DS4

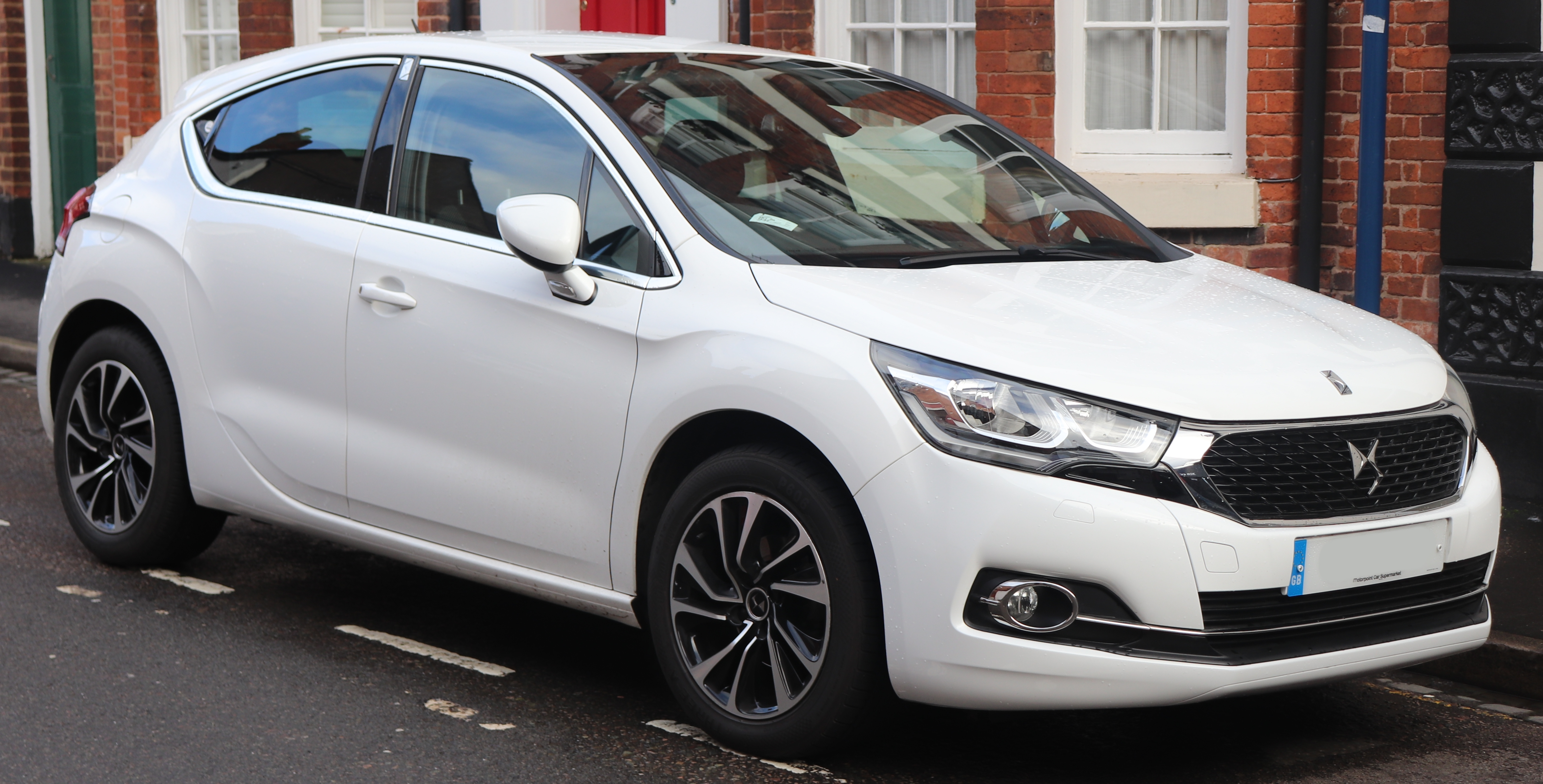
DS 4

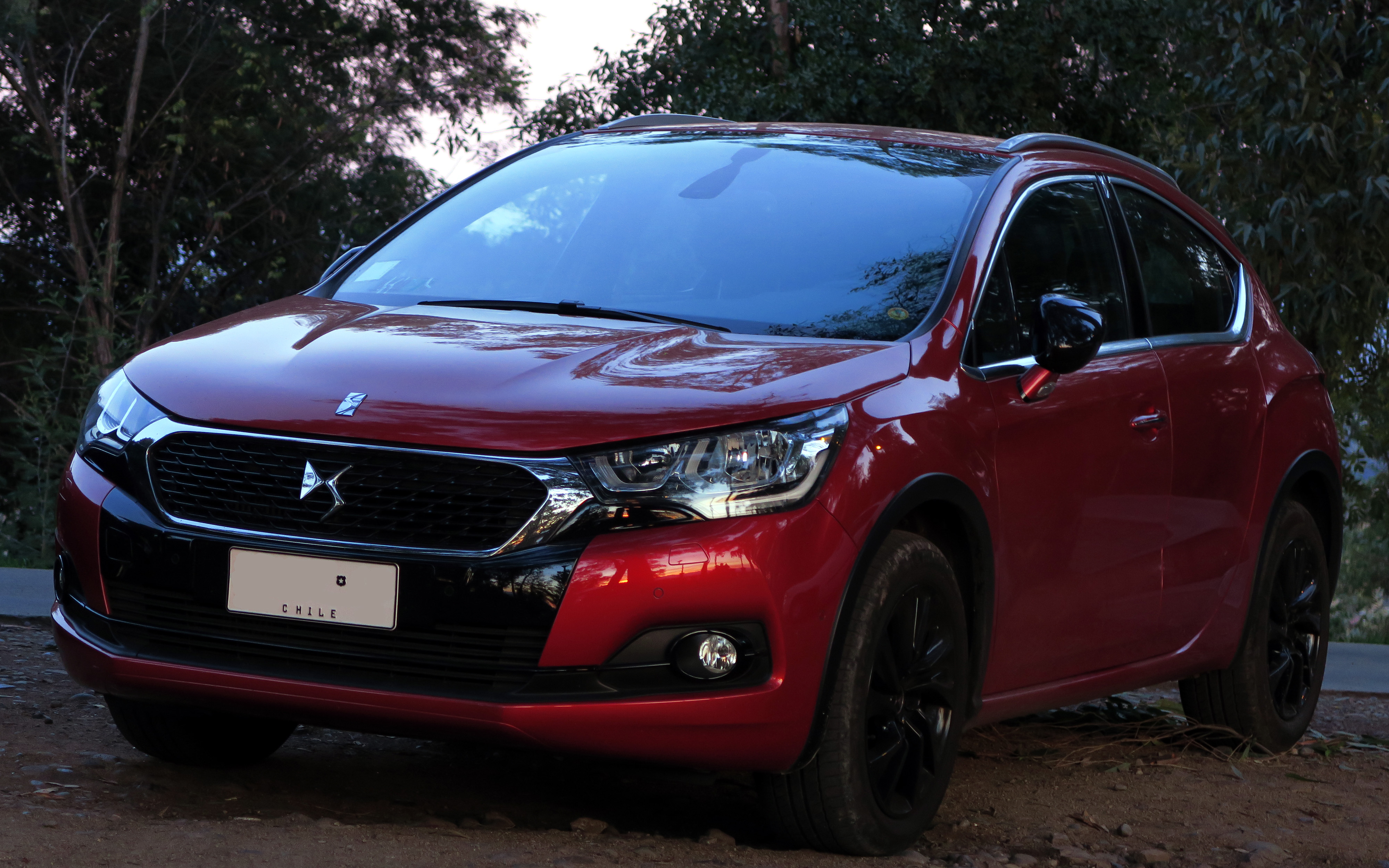
DS 4 Crossback

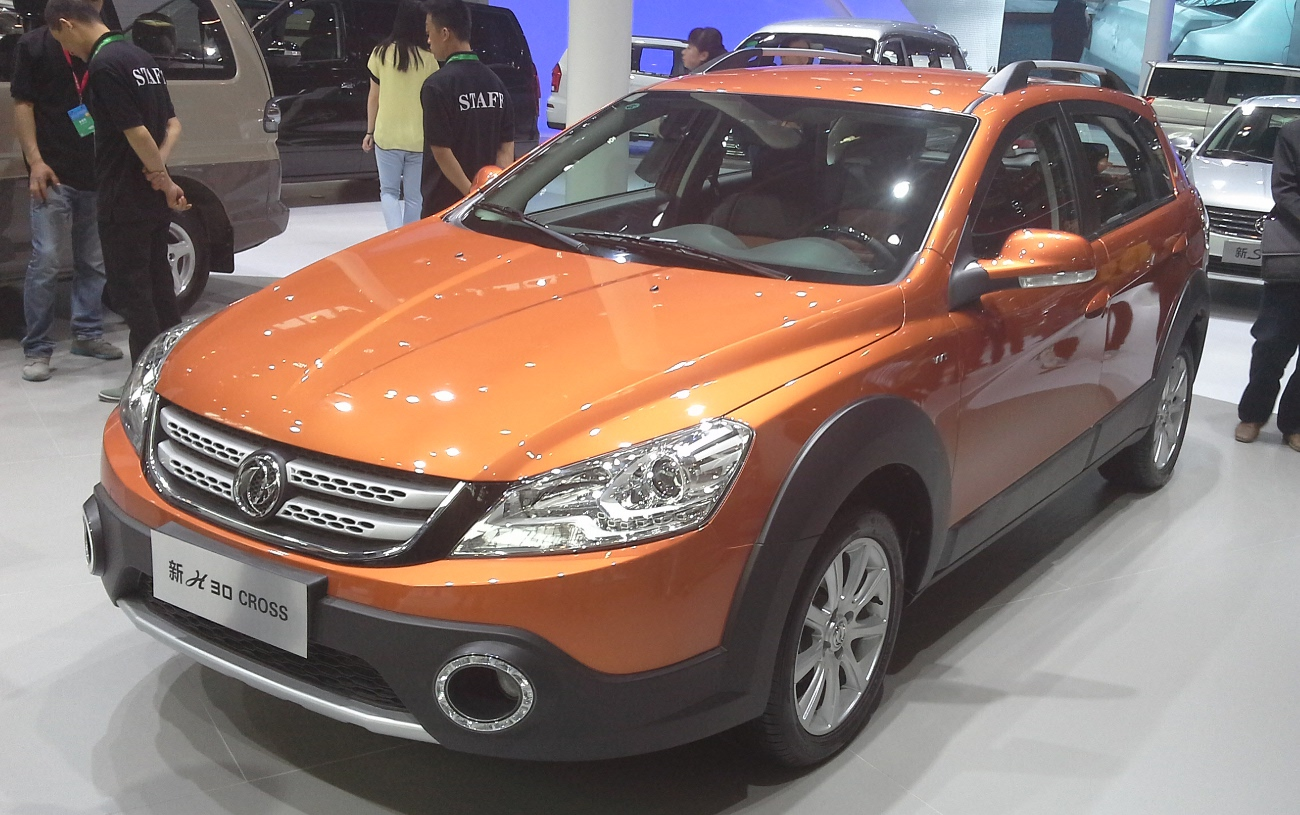
DongFeng H30 Cross

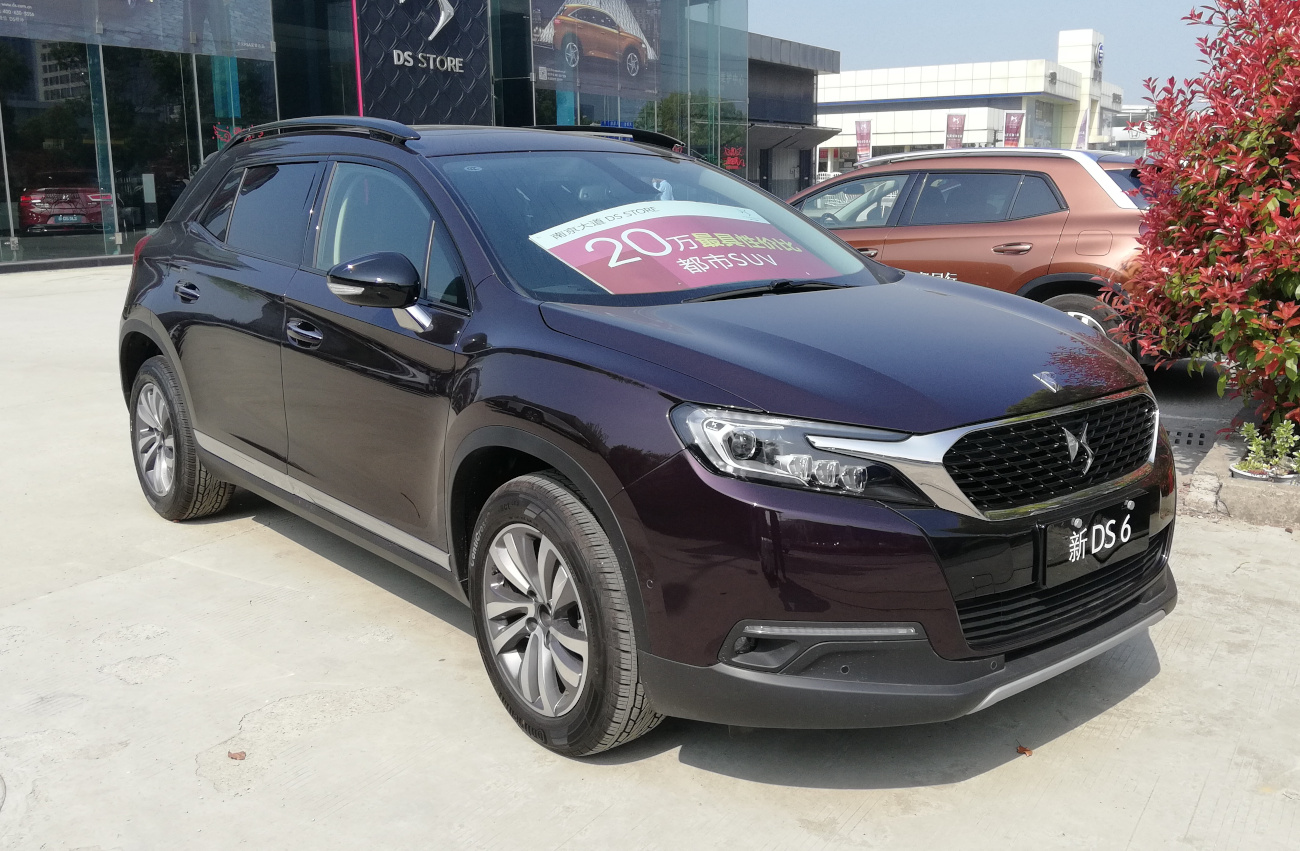
DS 6
- Extended
  - 2002–2008 Peugeot 307 SW
  - 2006–2013 Citroën C4 Picasso
  - 2006–2013 Citroën C4 Sedan (C-Triomphe/Pallas)
  - 2008–2018 Citroën Berlingo
  - 2008–2018 Peugeot Partner
  - 2008–2014 Peugeot 308 SW
  - 2009–2016 Peugeot 5008
  - 2010–2014 Peugeot 408
  - 2011–2018 Citroën DS5
  - 2015–2018 DS 5
  - 2012–2022 Citroën C4 II L
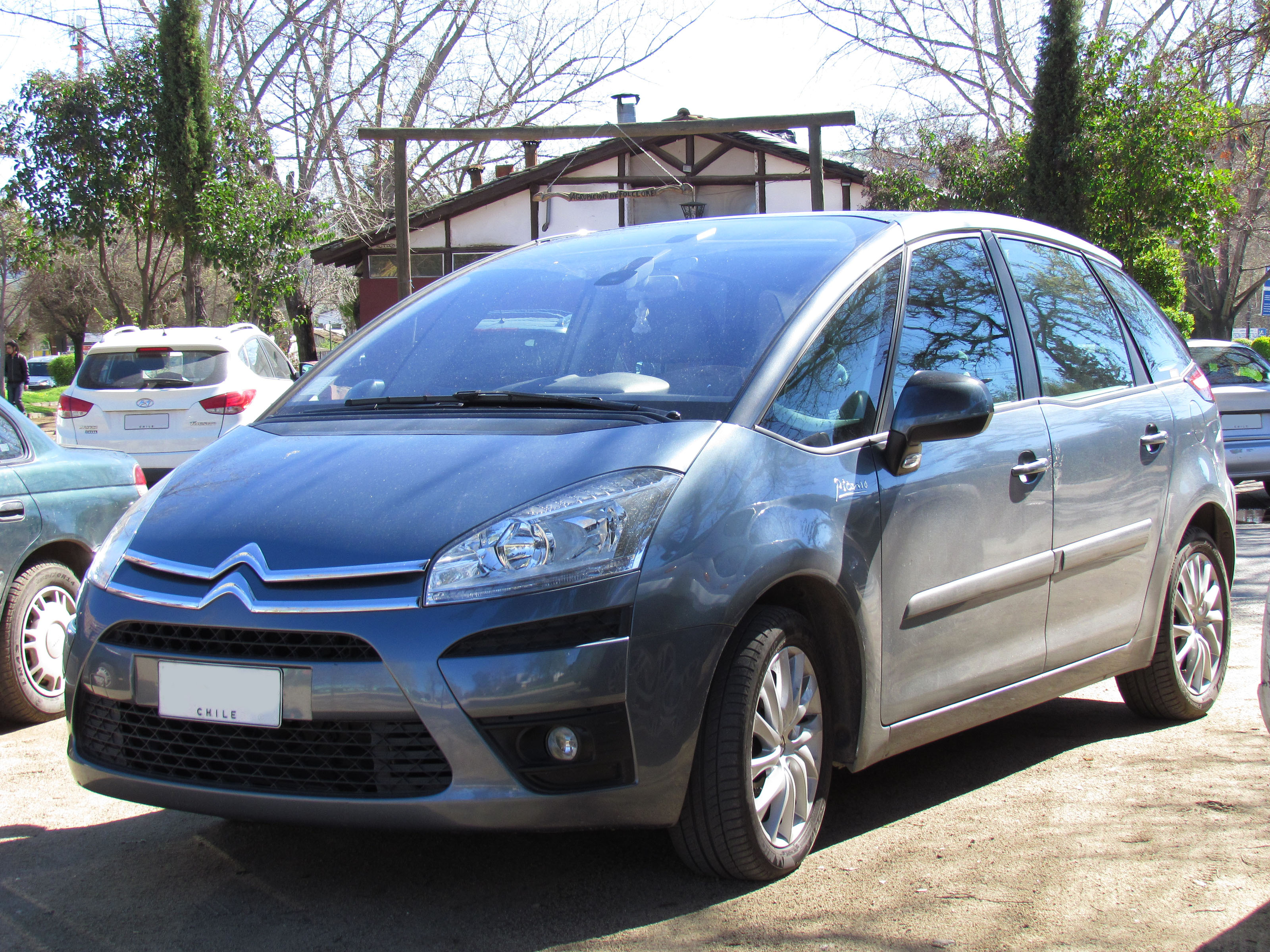
Citroën C4 Picasso

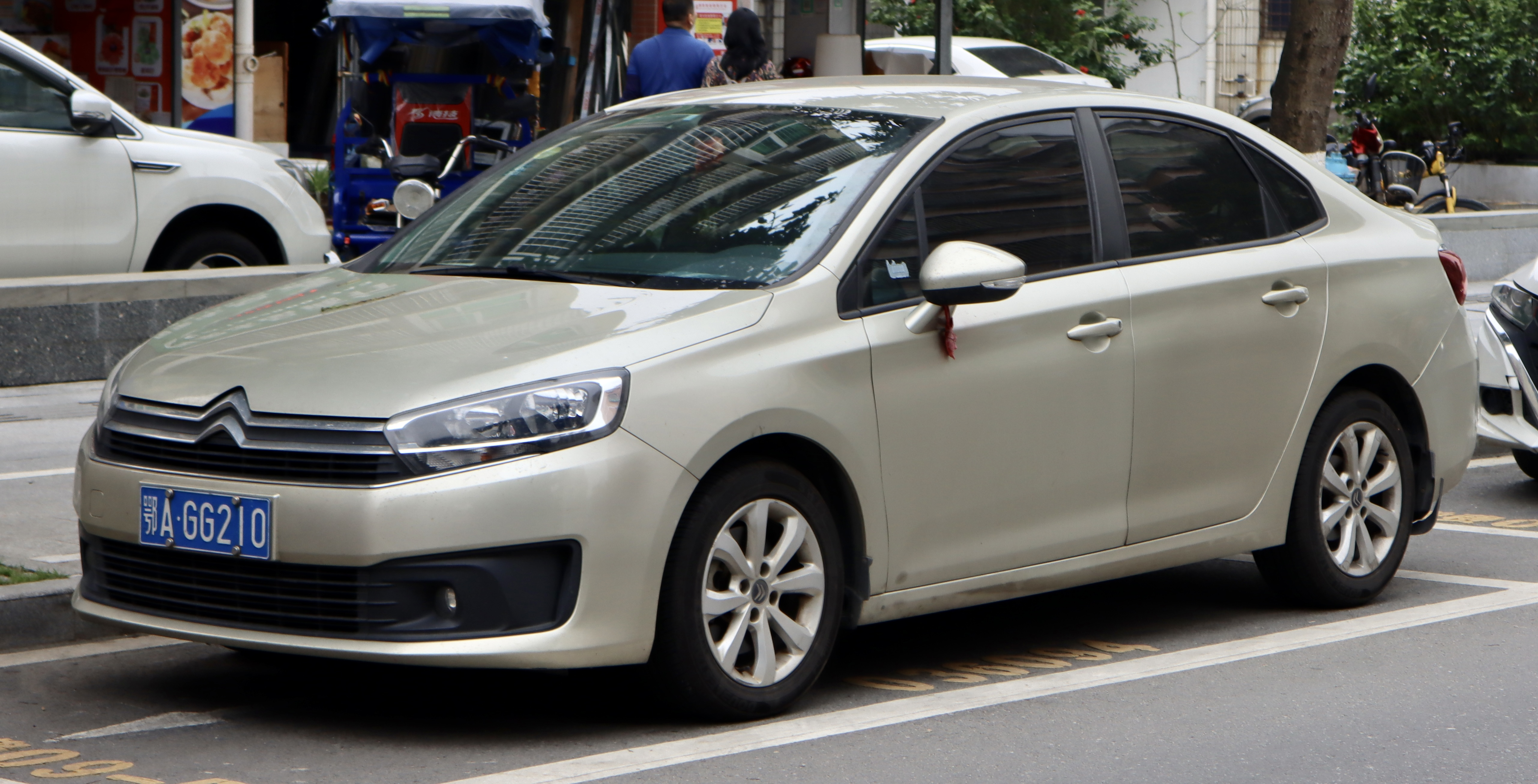
Citroën C4 Sedan (C-Triomphe/Pallas)

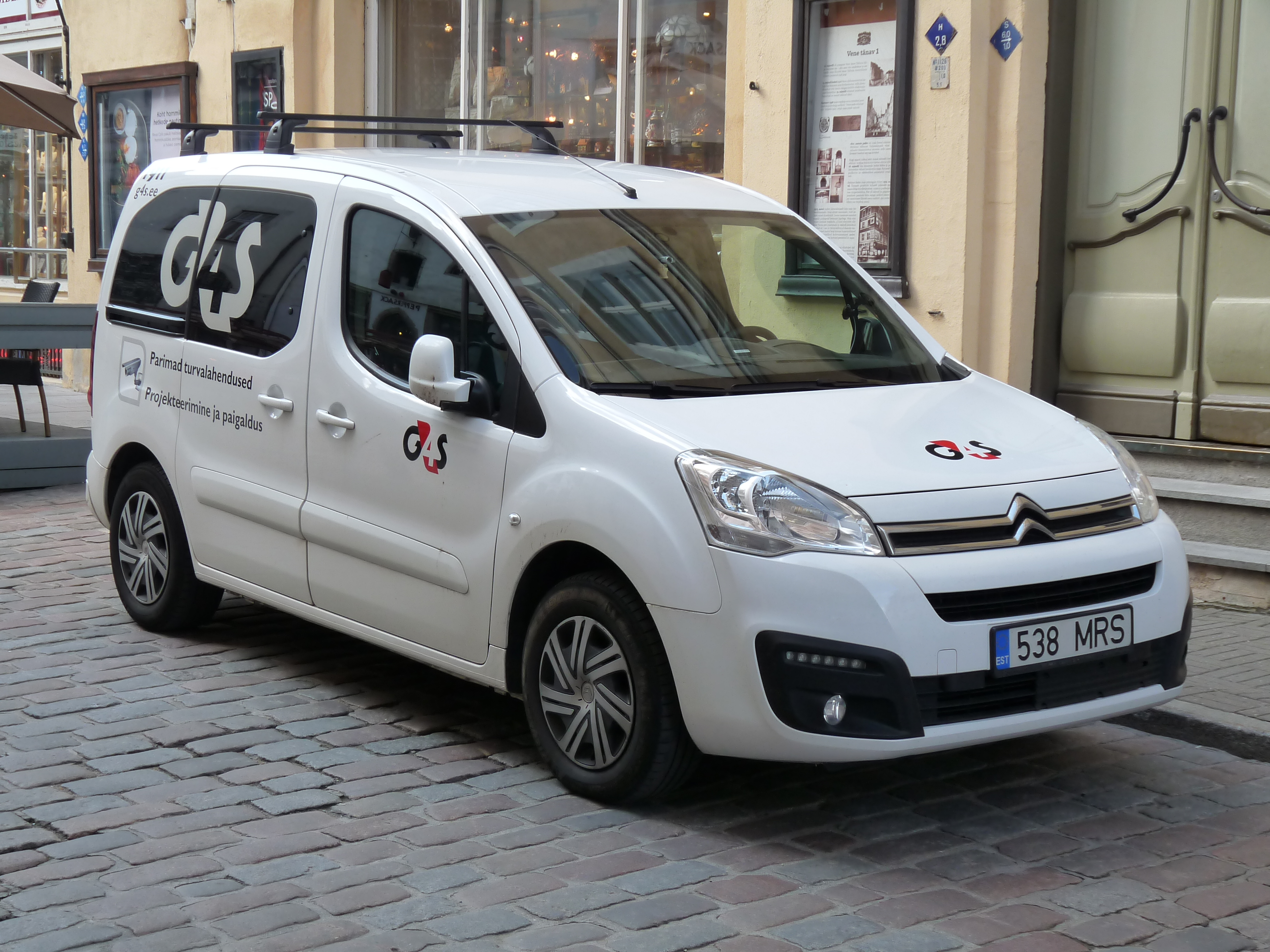
Citroën Berlingo

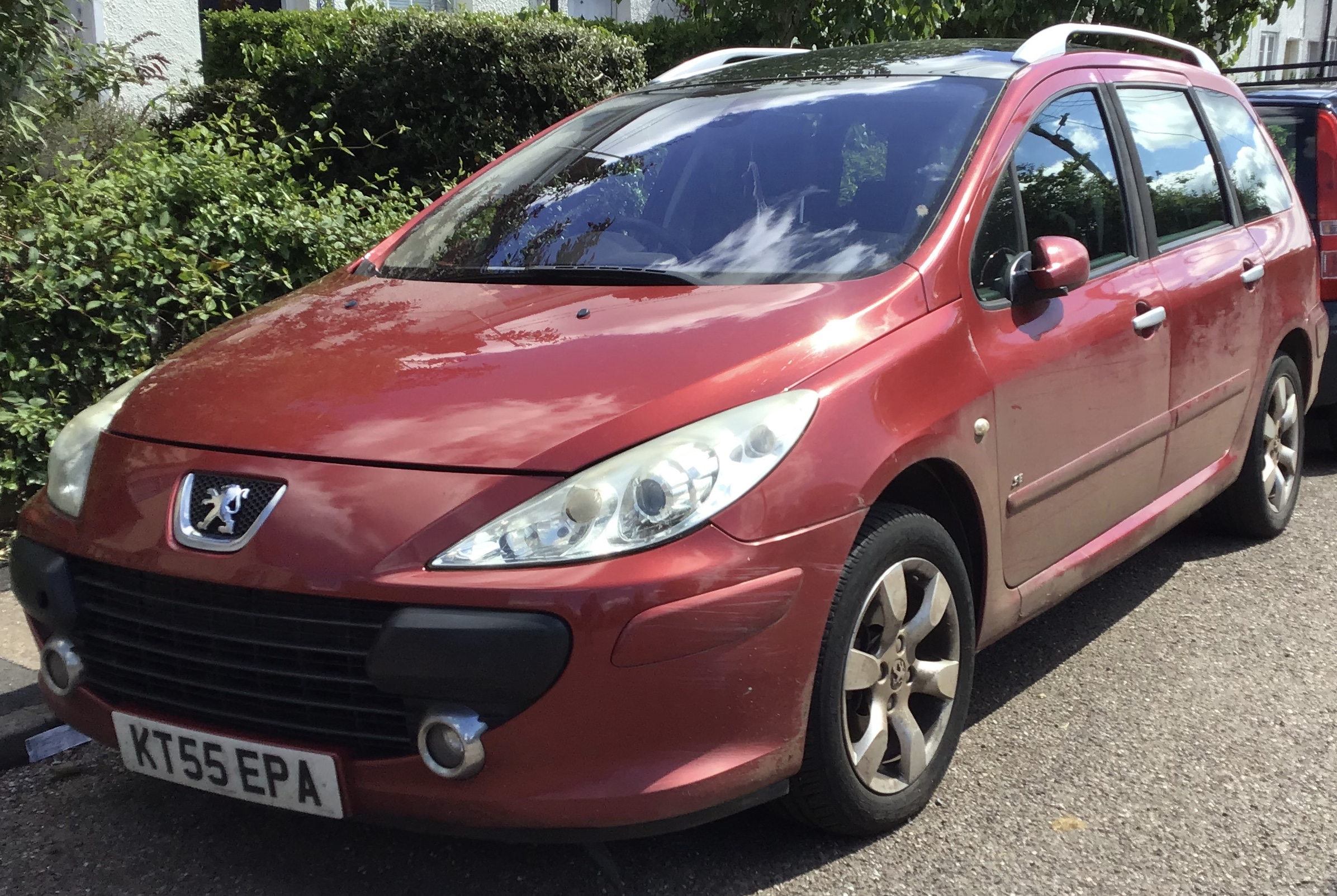
Peugeot 307 SW

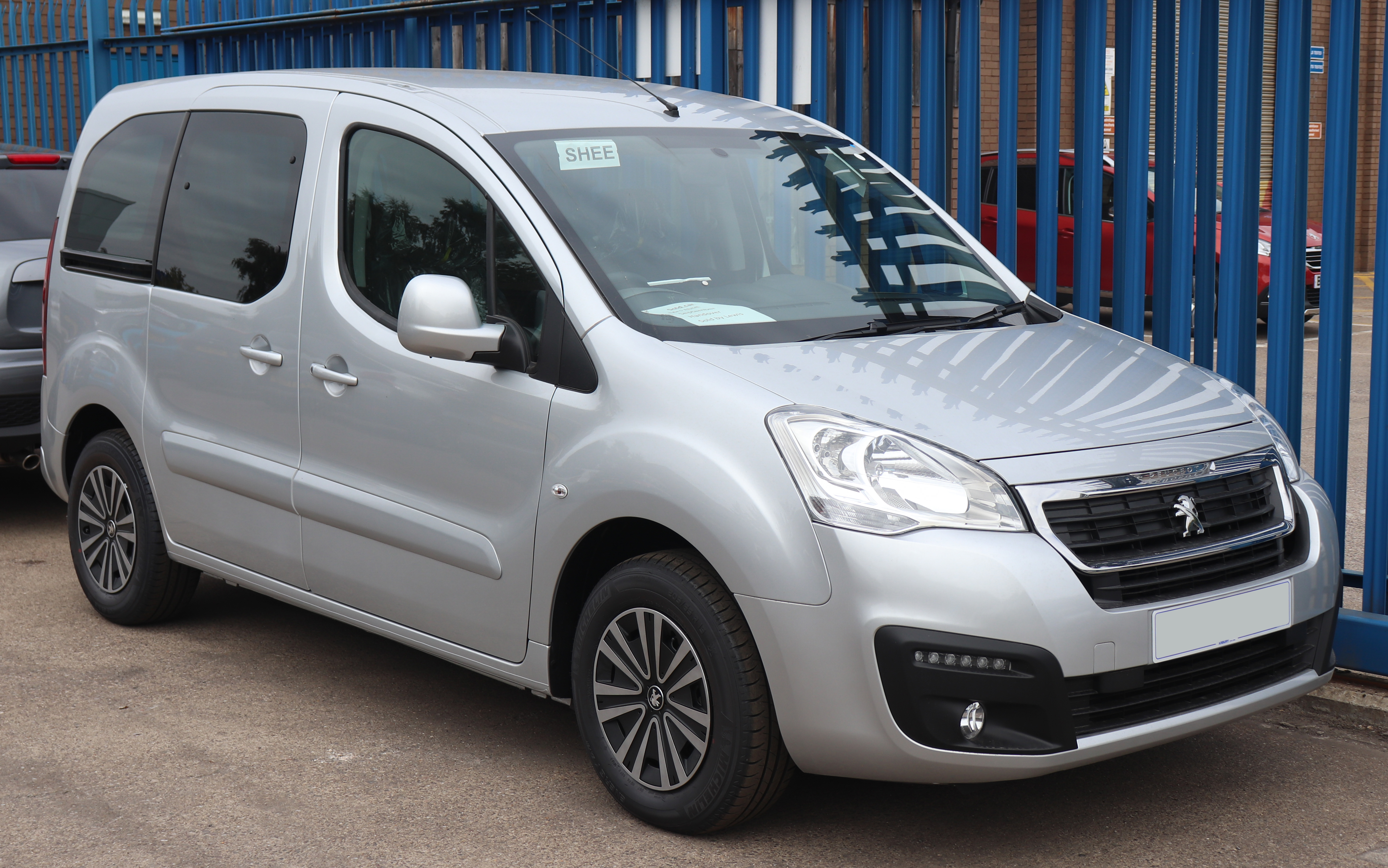
Peugeot Partner

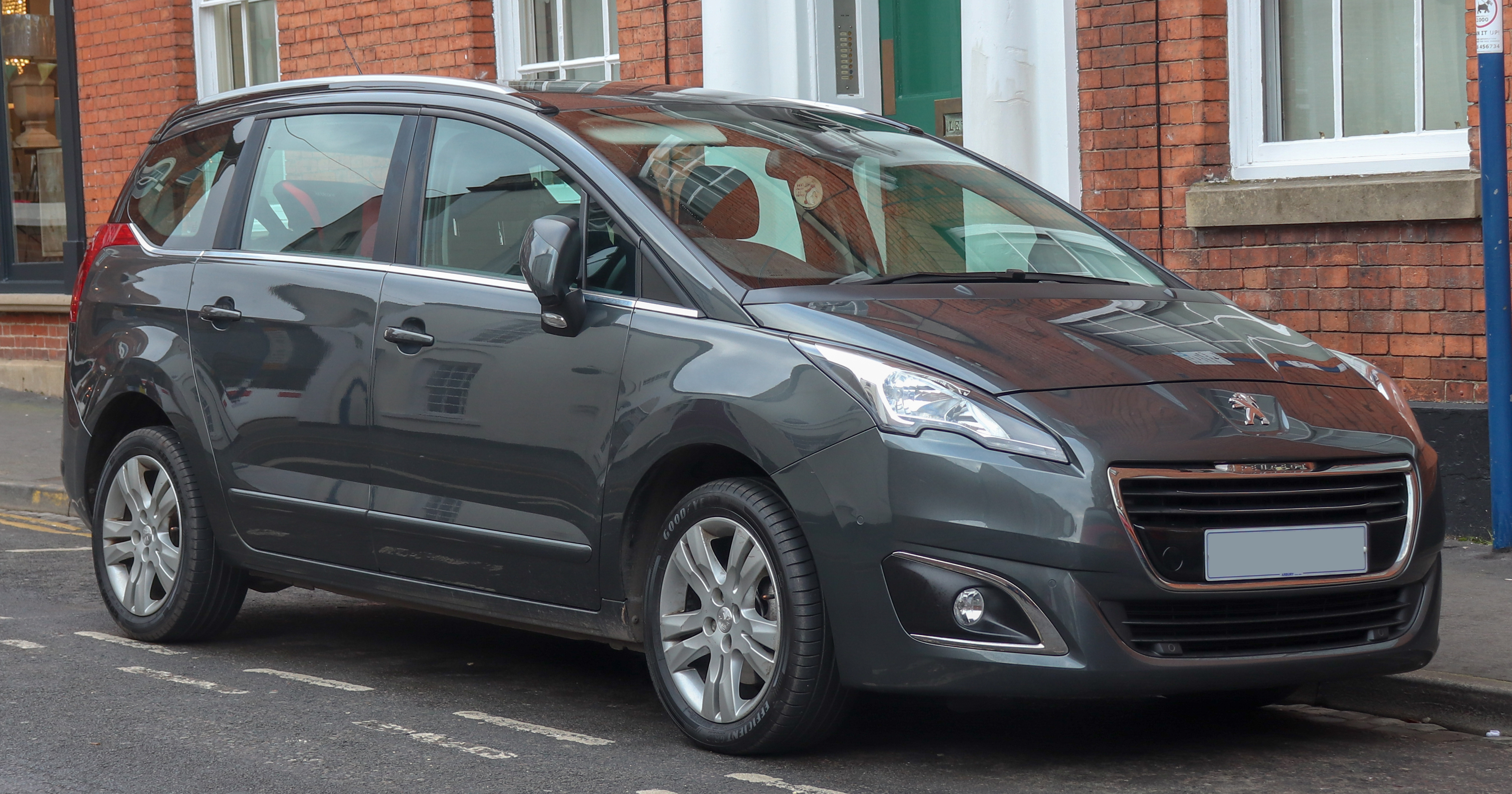
Peugeot 5008

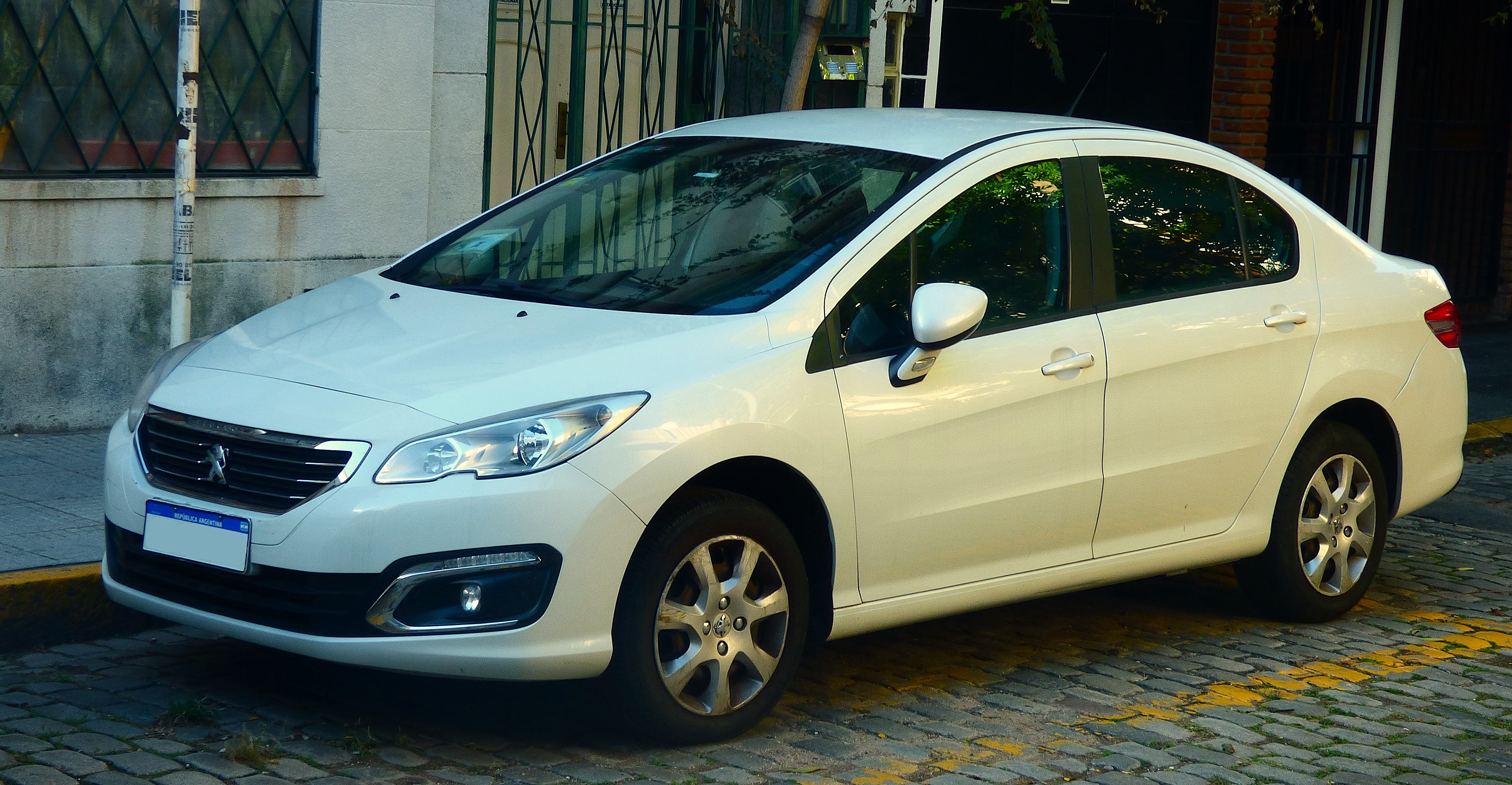
Peugeot 408

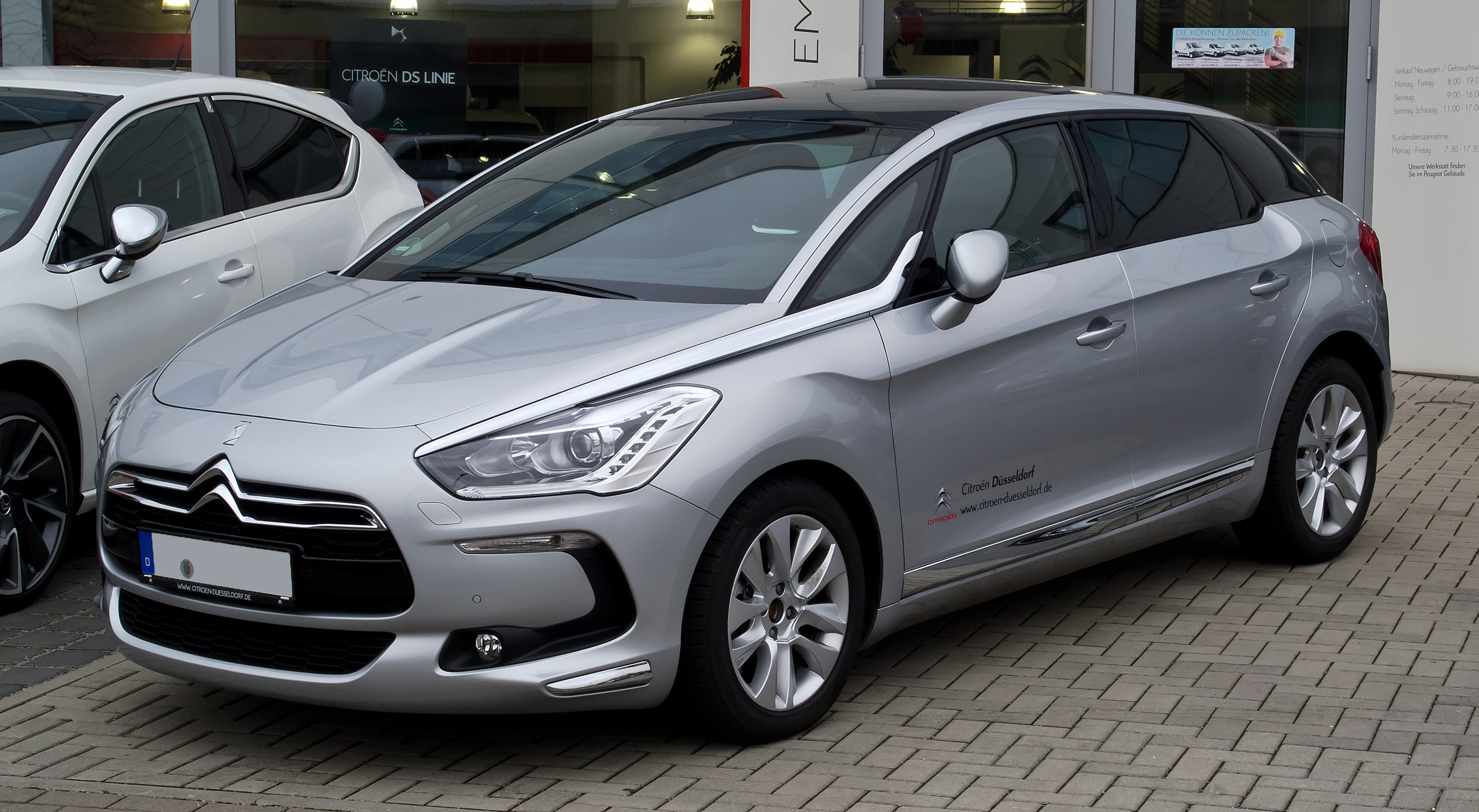
Citroën DS5

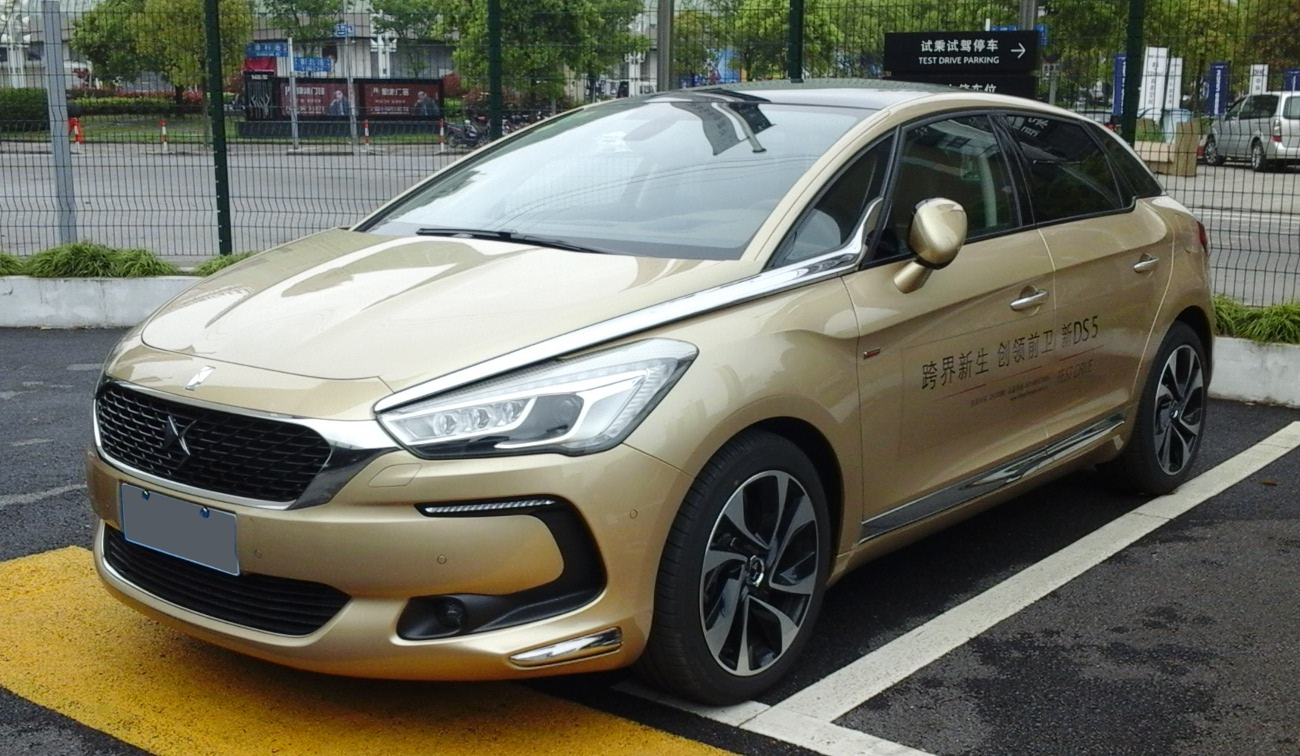
DS 5

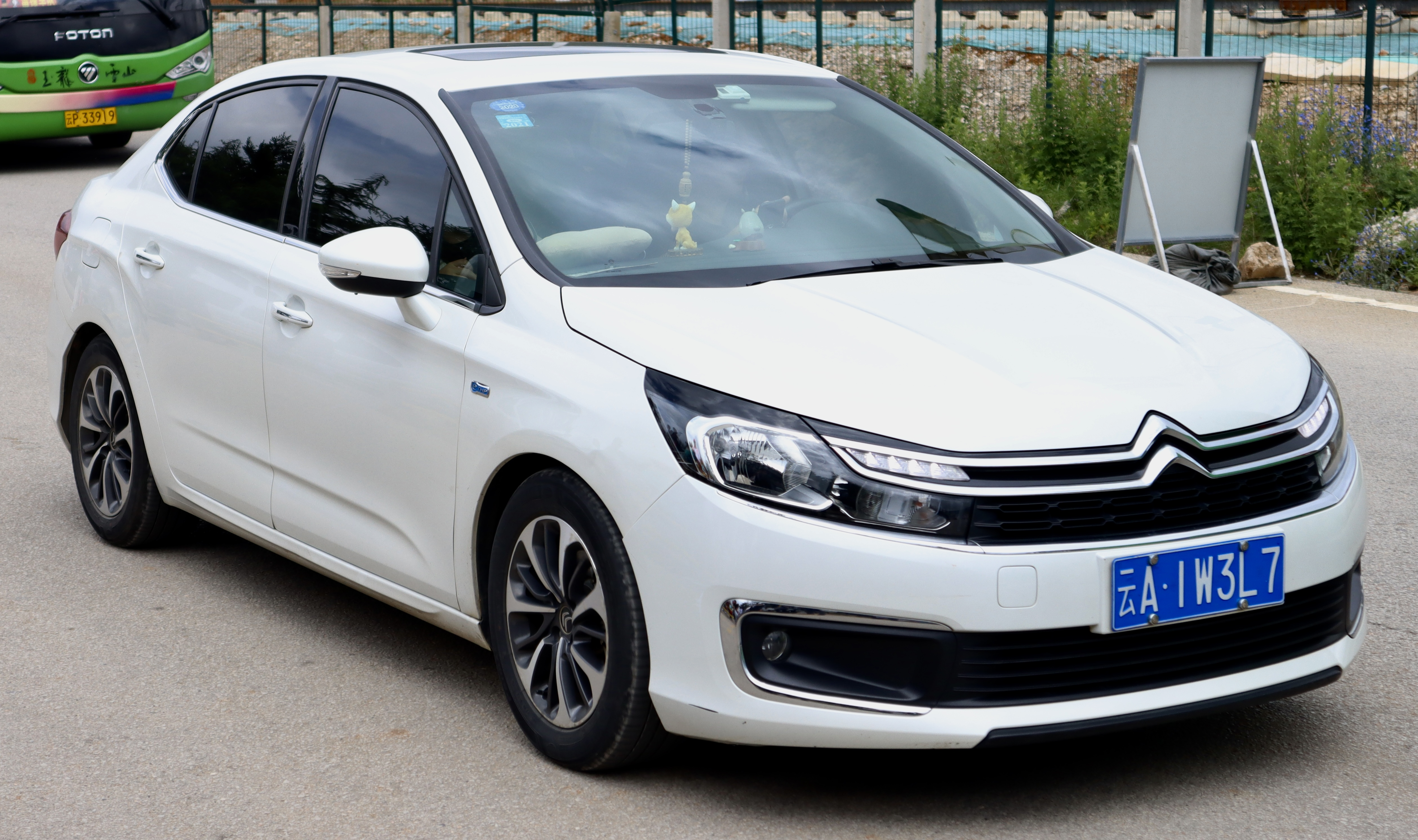
Citroën C4 II L
