= Irish Car of the Year =

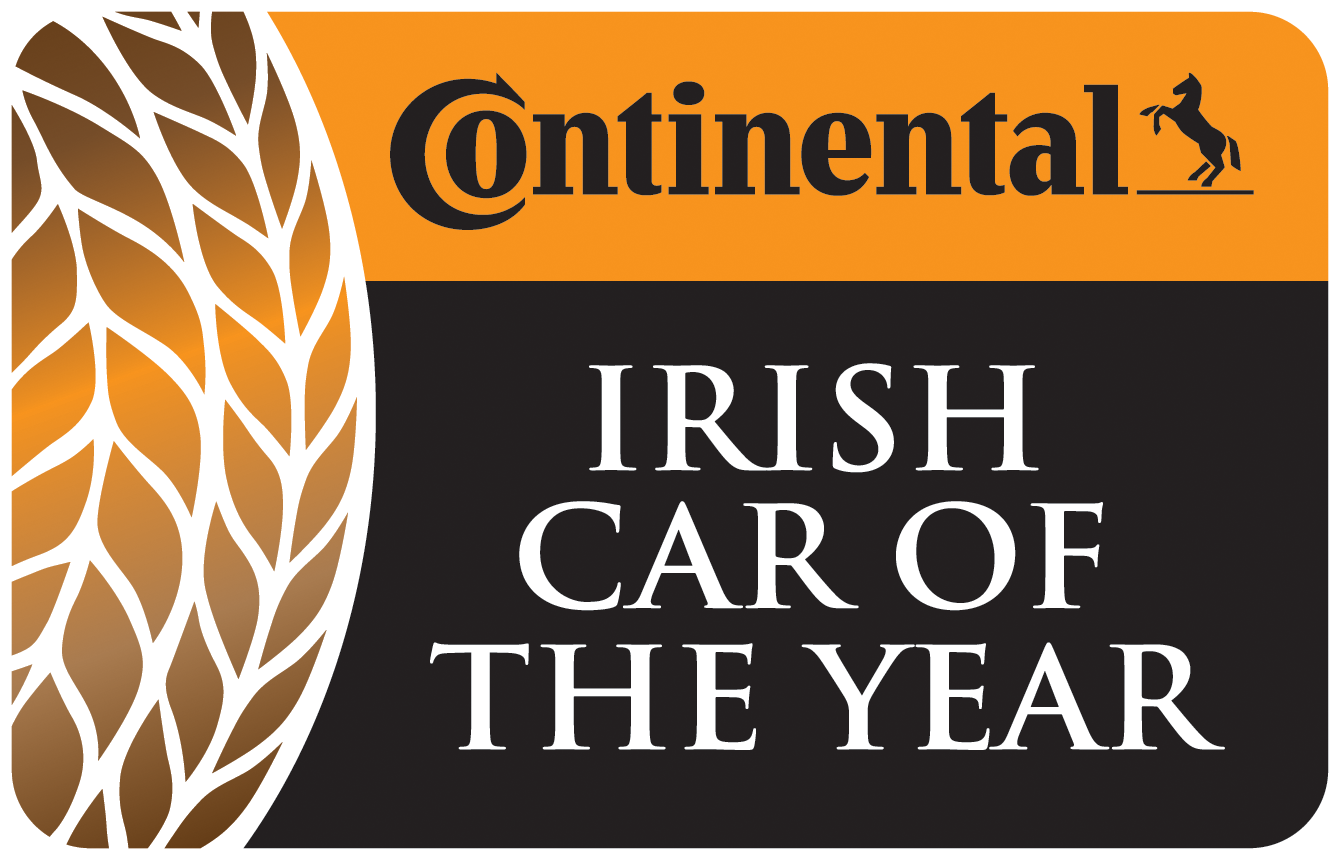
- Sponsored by: Continental Tyres
- Country: Ireland
- First award: 1978
- Final award: 2026
- Winner: Renault 5 E-Tech
- Website: www.caroftheyear.ie

The Continental Tyres Irish Car of the Year award was established in 1978 based on similar Car of the Year awards. It is organised and judged by the Motoring Media Association of Ireland (MMAI), comprising journalists across the country. The award was initially sponsored by Semperit and more recently by Semperit's owners, Continental Tyres.

The awards have eleven categories: Irish Car of the Year (overall winner), Compact Car, Medium Car, Large Car, Compact SUV, Medium SUV, Large SUV, Green/Efficient Car, Performance/Luxury Car, Hot Hatchback, and, since 2019, MPV.

Ford has won the competition eight times, with the Ford Mondeo winning the overall title the most times for an individual model. The winner for 2023 was the Volkswagen ID. Buzz. The awards ceremony is usually held each November in Dublin, with the awards presented for the following year. The awards ceremony for 2023 was held at the Westin Dublin Hotel.

== Current rules ==
Cars are assessed by a jury of 34 of the most experienced motoring journalists in Ireland. Each jury member road tests every car individually on the following criteria:

- use of new technology/new ideas
- safety factors
- equipment level, fuel economy, practicality
- environmental impact (emissions, recyclability)
- use of space, comfort, ventilation and layout
- build quality, fit and finishing
- ride, dynamic qualities, road holding, steering, manoeuvrability
- engine, ease of driving, braking
- price, warranty, dealer network, after sales service
- driver/user feedback

== Results ==
The first winner of the award was the Volkswagen Golf Diesel, which debuted four years after the regular Volkswagen Golf.

The Ford Mondeo is the only model to have won the title three times, in 1994, 2008 and 2016. It was beaten into second place in 2001 by the Renault Laguna.

The 2023 winner was the Volkswagen ID. Buzz with the van version, the ID. Buzz Cargo, winning the Irish Van of the Year title.

Year	Irish Car of the Year Winner
1978	Volkswagen Golf (Diesel)
1979	Volkswagen Derby
1980	Fiat Ritmo
1981	Datsun Stanza
1982	Ford Escort
1983	Ford Sierra
1984	Fiat Uno
1985	Opel Kadett
1986	Ford Granada
1987	Fiat Croma
1988	Toyota Corolla
1989	Fiat Tipo
1990	Renault 19
1991	Fiat Tempra
1992	Opel Astra
1993	Toyota Carina E
1994	Ford Mondeo
1995	Opel Omega
1996	Volkswagen Polo
1997	Peugeot 406
1998	Citroën Xsara
1999	Ford Focus
2000	Toyota Yaris
2001	Opel Corsa
2002	Renault Laguna
2003	Mazda6
2004	Toyota Avensis
2005	Ford Focus
2006	Suzuki Swift
2007	Honda Civic
2008	Ford Mondeo
2009	Citroën C5
2010	Peugeot 3008
2011	Nissan Juke
2012	Kia Rio
2013	BMW 3 Series (F30)
2014	Citroën C4 Picasso
2015	Nissan Qashqai
2016	Ford Mondeo
2017	Mercedes-Benz E-Class
2018	Peugeot 3008
2019	Volvo XC40
2020	Kia e-Soul
2021	not held
2022	Kia EV6
2023	Volkswagen ID. Buzz
2024	Hyundai Ioniq 6
2025	Renault Scenic
2026	Renault 5 E-Tech

=== By manufacturer ===
Brand	Award no.	Models							
(Germany) Ford	8	Escort (1982)	Sierra (1983)	Granada (1986)	Mondeo (1994)	Focus (1999)	Focus (2005)	Mondeo (2008)	Mondeo (2016)
(Italy) Fiat	5	Ritmo (1980)	Uno (1984)	Croma (1987)	Tipo (1989)	Tempra (1991)			
(Germany) Opel	4	Kadett (1985)	Astra (1992)	Omega (1995)	Corsa (2001)				
(France) Renault	4	19 (1990)	Laguna (2002)	Scenic E-Tech (2025)	5 E-Tech (2026)				
(Japan) Toyota	4	Corolla (1988)	Carina (1993)	Yaris (2000)	Avensis (2004)				
(Germany) Volkswagen	4	Golf (1978)	Derby (1979)	Polo (1996)	ID. Buzz (2023)				
(France) Citroën	3	Xsara (1998)	C5 (2009)	C4 Picasso (2014)					
(France) Peugeot	3	406 (1997)	3008 (2010)	3008 (2018)					
(South Korea) Kia	3	Rio (2012)	e-Soul (2020)	EV6 (2022)					
(Japan) Nissan	2	Juke (2011)	Qashqai (2015)						
(Germany) BMW	1	F30 (2013)							
(Japan) Datsun	1	Stanza (1981)							
(Japan) Honda	1	Civic (2007)							
(South Korea) Hyundai	1	Ioniq 6 (2024)							
(Japan) Mazda	1	6 (2003)							
(Germany) Mercedes	1	E-Class (2017)							
(Japan) Suzuki	1	Swift (2006)							
(Sweden) Volvo	1	XC40 (2019)							

== See also ==
- Car of the Year
- List of motor vehicle awards
