= Peugeot 3008 =

Compact crossover SUV

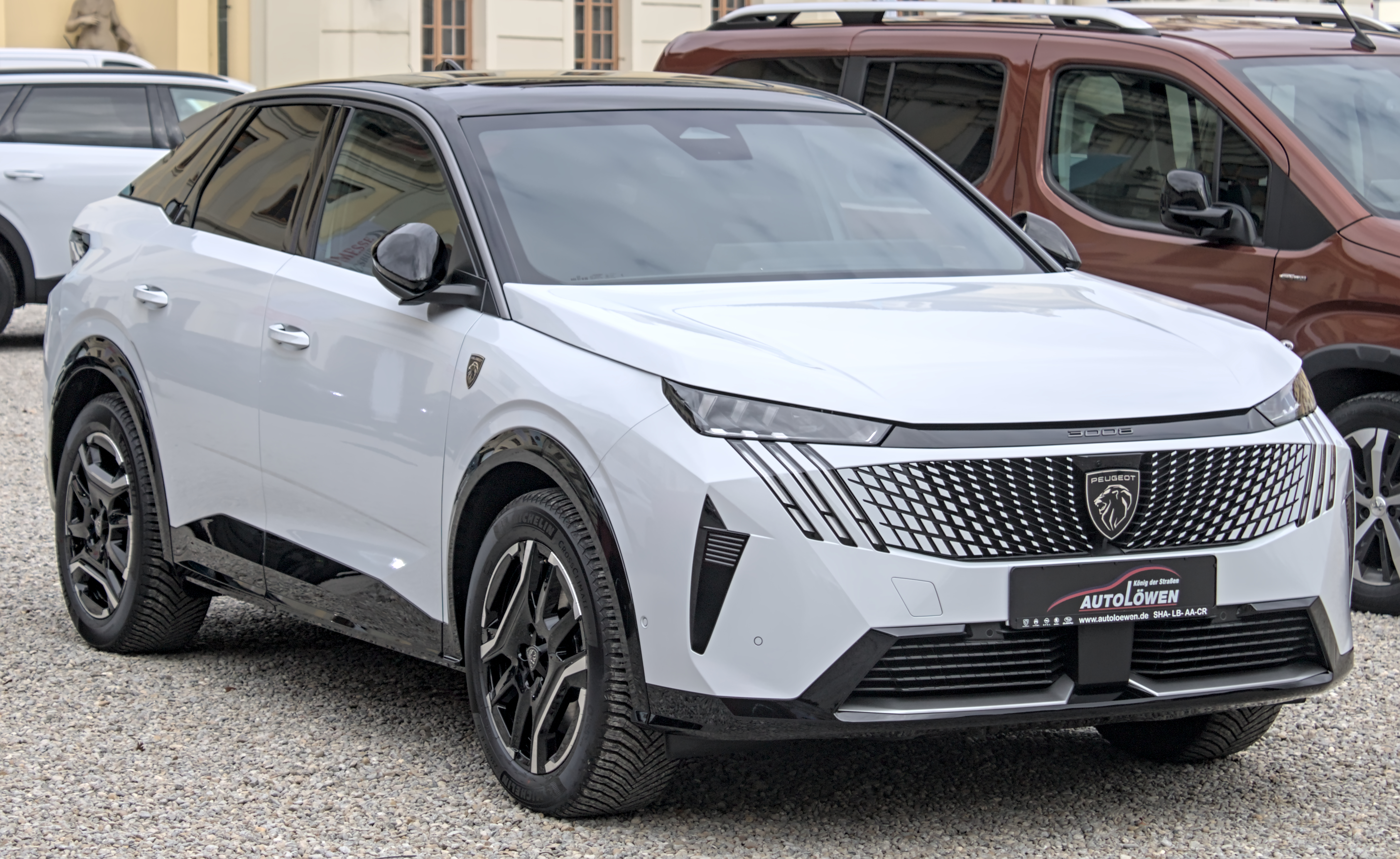
- Peugeot e-3008 from 2024

Overview
- Manufacturer: Peugeot (Note: PSA Group (2008–2021); Stellantis (2021–present))
- Production: 2008–present

Body and chassis
- Class: Compact crossover SUV (C)
- Body style: 5-door SUV
- Layout: Front-engine, front-wheel-drive or all-wheel-drive
- Related: Peugeot 308; Peugeot 5008

Chronology
- Predecessor: Peugeot 4007; Peugeot 4008

The Peugeot 3008 is a compact crossover SUV manufactured and marketed by Peugeot. It was first presented to the public in Dubrovnik, Croatia in 2008, and then again in 2010 at the Mondial de l'Automobile in Paris, by the French manufacturer Peugeot. It fills a gap in Peugeot's model lineup between the Peugeot 308, with which it shares its platform, and the Peugeot 5008, its larger counterpart. The second-generation model, which is based on an EMP2 platform first seen on the second-generation Peugeot 308, was released in May 2016, with the vehicle being available as of January 2017. The third-generation model waa released in September 2023, based on the Stellantis' SLTA Medium platform, which it is shares with a wide range of Stellantis vehicles.

== First generation (T84; 2008) ==
First generation
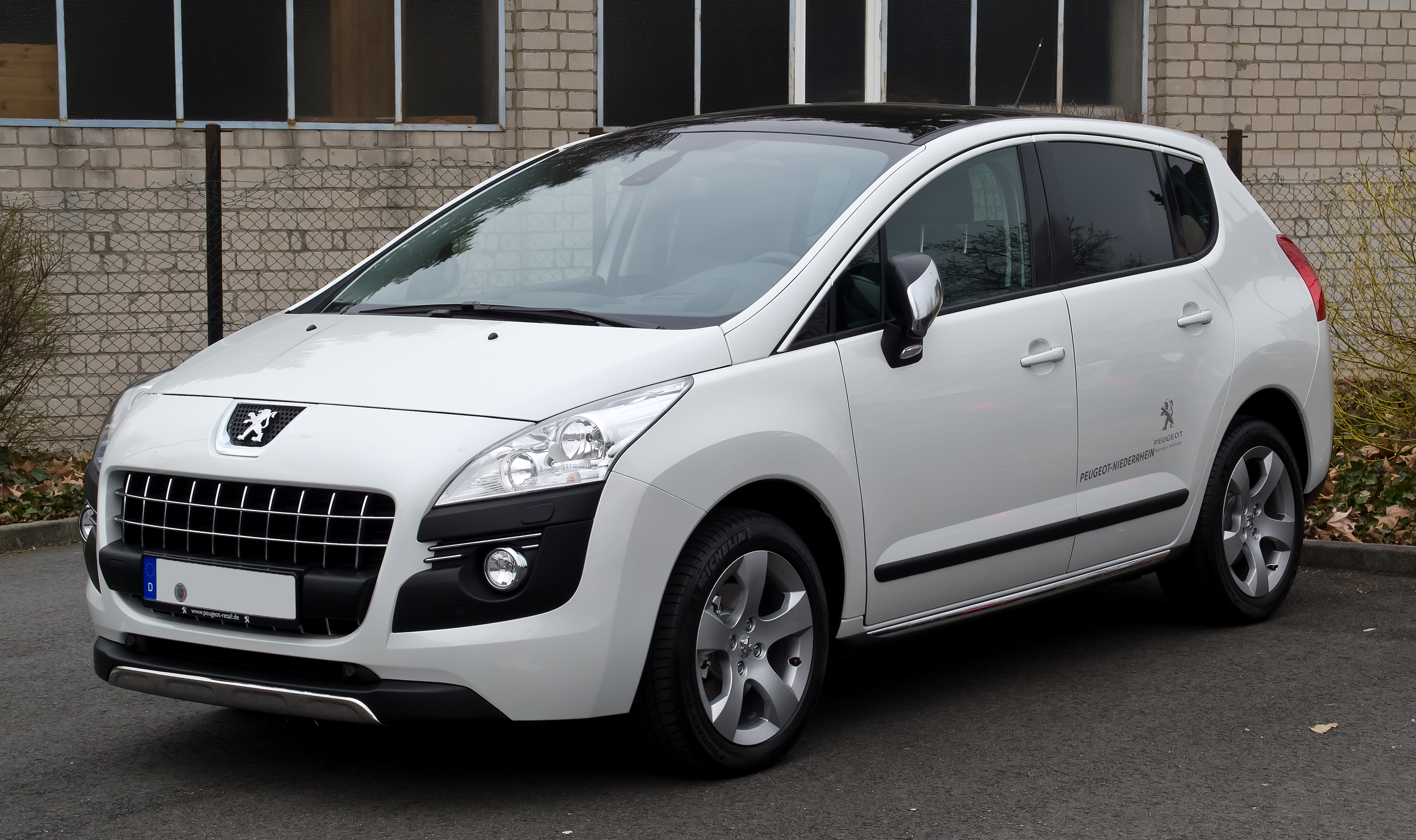

Overview
- Model code: T84
- Production: 2008–2016; 2010–2019 (China)
- Assembly: France: Mulhouse (PSA Mulhouse Plant); Sochaux (PSA Sochaux Plant); China: Wuhan (DPCA); Malaysia: Gurun (NAM); Kazakhstan: Kostanay (Saryarka AvtoProm)

Body and chassis
- Platform: PSA PF2 platform
- Related: Peugeot 308 I Peugeot 5008 I Citroën C4; Citroën C4 Picasso

Powertrain
- Engine: petrol: 1.2 L EB2 turbo I3; 1.6 L EP6 I4; 1.6 L EP6 turbo I4; diesel: 1.6 L DV6 I4; 2.0 L DW10 HDi I4; diesel hybrid: 2.0 L DW10 HDi I4
- Transmission: 5-speed manual 6-speed manual 6-speed automatic 6-speed automated manual

Dimensions
- Wheelbase: 2,613 mm (102.9 in)
- Length: Global: 4,365 mm (171.9 in); China: 4,430 mm (174.4 in)
- Width: 1,837 mm (72.3 in)
- Height: 1,639 mm (64.5 in)

Launched in 2008, the 3008 shares its platform and bears similarity with the Peugeot 5008, which is a three-row MPV and larger counterpart of 3008. Despite having had its styling criticised, the 3008 has been praised by automobile magazines. In January 2010, the British motoring magazine What Car? awarded it Car of the Year for 2010. It also was awarded 2010 Semperit Irish Car of the Year in Ireland. The 3008 followed up this award in 2018, by winning the Continental Irish Car of the Year.

The Exclusive and Allure models have a head up display, which projects a reading onto a small perspex-like screen just in front of the main windscreen area in front of the driver. It also contains a distance alert, which warns the driver if they are too close to the car in front. It also displays details for cruise control or the speed limiter.

=== Hybrid version ===
The Peugeot 3008 HYbrid4 was launched in February 2012, and is the world's first mass production diesel electric hybrid, which used the 6-speed automatic transmission. It included the only 2.0-litre DW10 diesel engine in the PSA line-up. The DW10 engine was rated at 163 PS (120 kW; 161 hp) at 3750 rpm and 340 N⋅m (251 lb⋅ft) at 2000 rpm.

The crossover hybrid has four different operating modes: Auto (the electronics automatically control the entire system), ZEV (all electric), four wheel drive mode (4WD) and sport (higher engine speeds than normal mode). A 200v nickel-metal hydride (Ni/MH) battery pack is located in the rear.

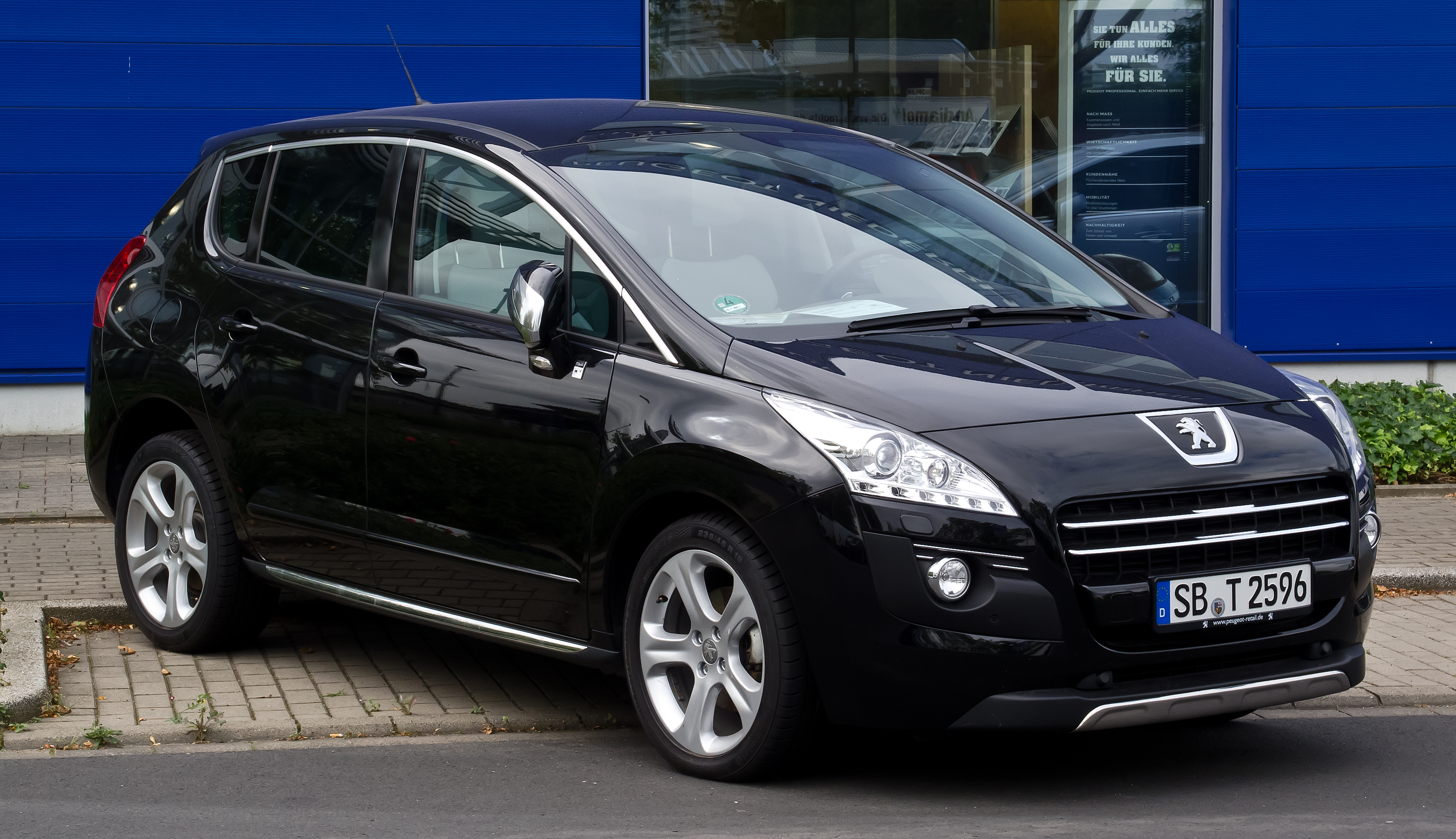
Peugeot 3008 HYbrid4

=== Engines ===
Petrol engines
Model	Engine	Displacement	Power	Torque	0–100 km/h (0–62 mph) (s)	Top speed	Transmission	CO_{2} emissions (g/km)
1.2 e-THP 2015–2016	I3	1199 cc	130 PS (96 kW; 128 hp) at 5,500 rpm	230 N⋅m (170 lb⋅ft) at 1,750 rpm	10.8	121 mph (195 km/h)	6 speed manual	123
1.6 VTi 2009–2016	I4	1598 cc	120 PS (88 kW; 118 hp) at 6,000 rpm	160 N⋅m (118 lb⋅ft) at 4,250 rpm	11.8	115 mph (185 km/h)	5 speed manual	165
1.6 THP 2009–2016	I4	1598 cc	156 PS (115 kW; 154 hp) at 5,800 rpm	240 N⋅m (177 lb⋅ft) at 1,400 rpm	8.9	125 mph (201 km/h)	6 speed manual	167
1.6 THP 2009–2016	I4	1598 cc	156 PS (115 kW; 154 hp) at 5,800 rpm	240 N⋅m (177 lb⋅ft) at 1,400 rpm	8.9	125 mph (201 km/h)	6 speed automatic	167
Diesel engines
Model	Engine	Displacement	Power	Torque	0–100 km/h (0–62 mph) (s)	Top speed	Transmission	CO_{2} emissions (g/km)
HDi 110 2009–2016	I4	1560 cc	110 PS (81 kW; 108 hp) at 4,000 rpm	240 N⋅m (177 lb⋅ft) at 1,750 rpm	12.2	112 mph (180 km/h)	6 speed automated manual	137
HDi 110 2009–2016	I4	1560 cc	110 PS (81 kW; 108 hp) at 4,000 rpm	240 N⋅m (177 lb⋅ft) at 1,750 rpm	12.2	112 mph (180 km/h)	6 speed manual	137
HDi 150 2009–2016	I4	1997 cc	150 PS (110 kW; 148 hp) at 3,750 rpm	340 N⋅m (251 lb⋅ft) at 2,000 rpm	9.8	122 mph (196 km/h)	6 speed manual	146
HDi 163 2009–2016	I4	1997 cc	163 PS (120 kW; 161 hp) at 3,750 rpm	340 N⋅m (251 lb⋅ft) at 2,000 rpm	10.2	118 mph (190 km/h)	6 speed automatic	173

=== Global version ===
Pre-facelift styling (2008-2013)

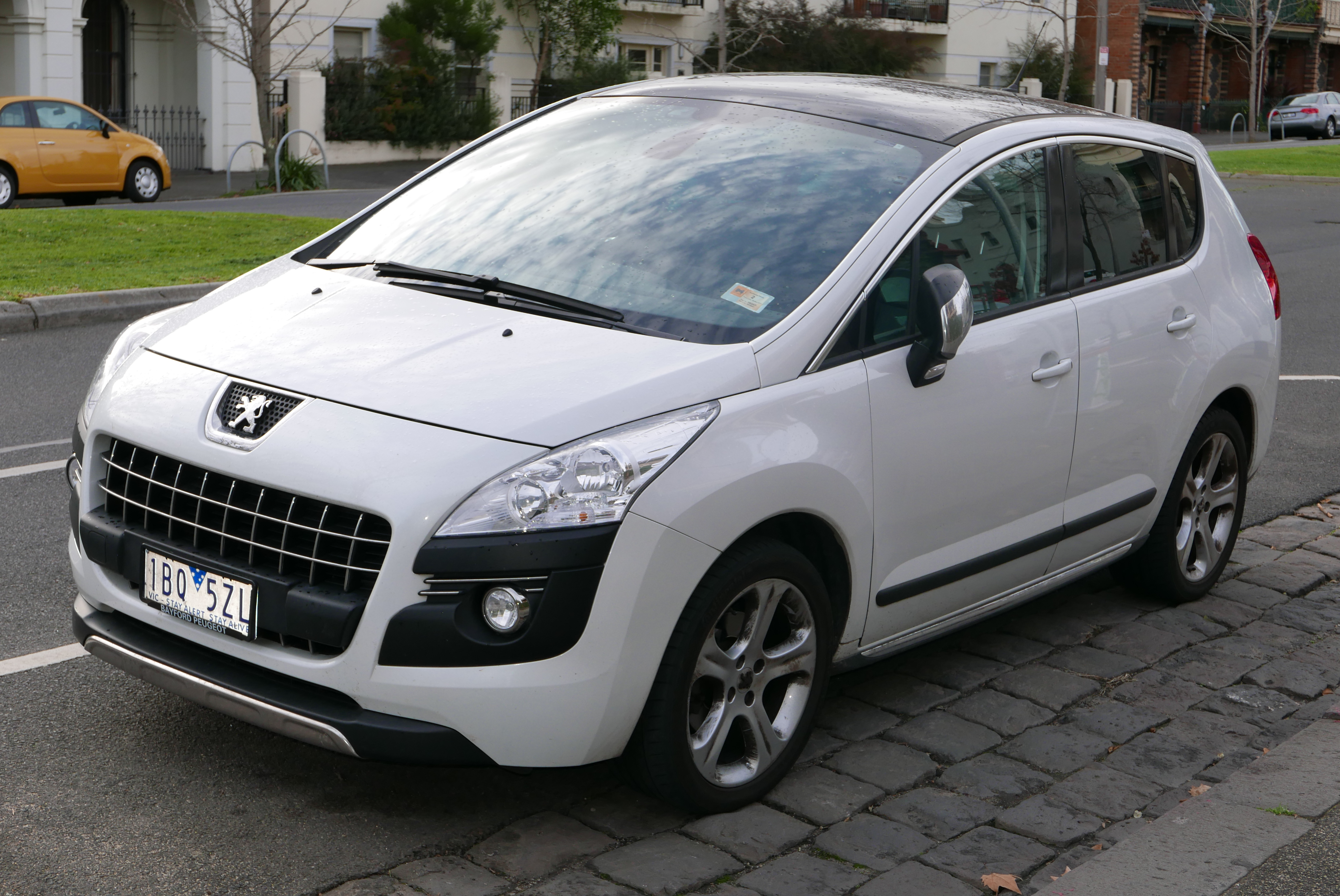
Front

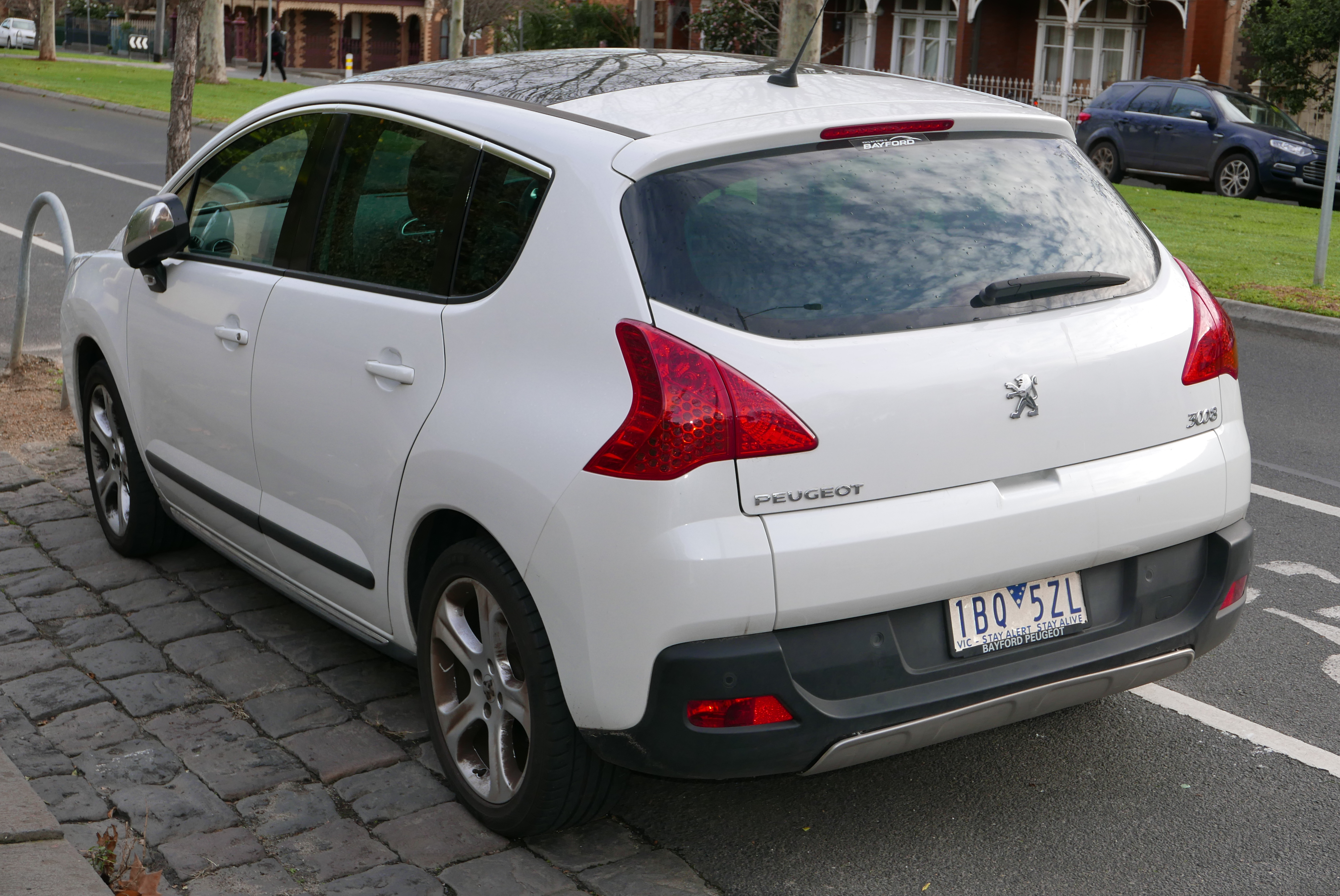
Rear

Facelift styling (2013-2016)

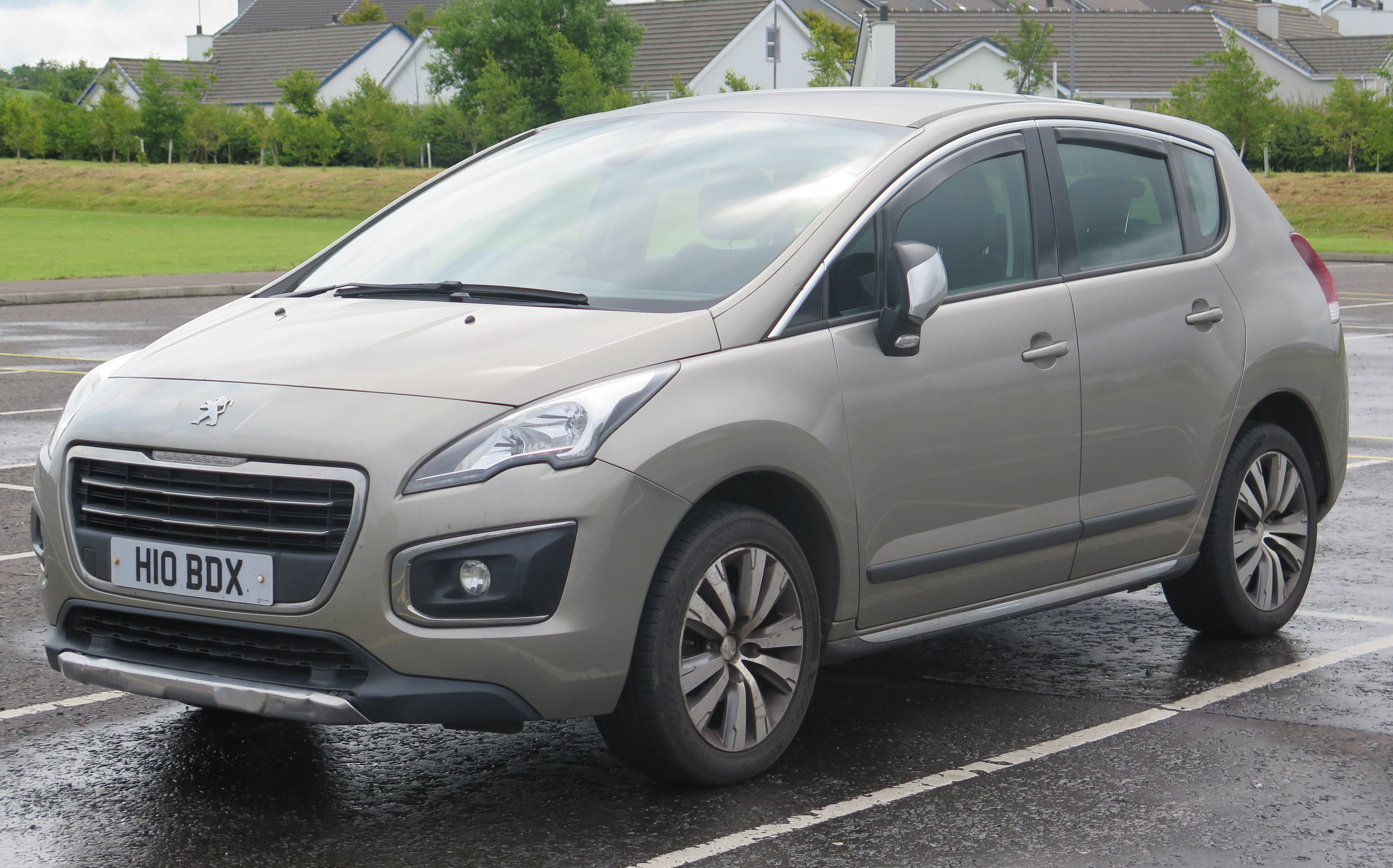
Front

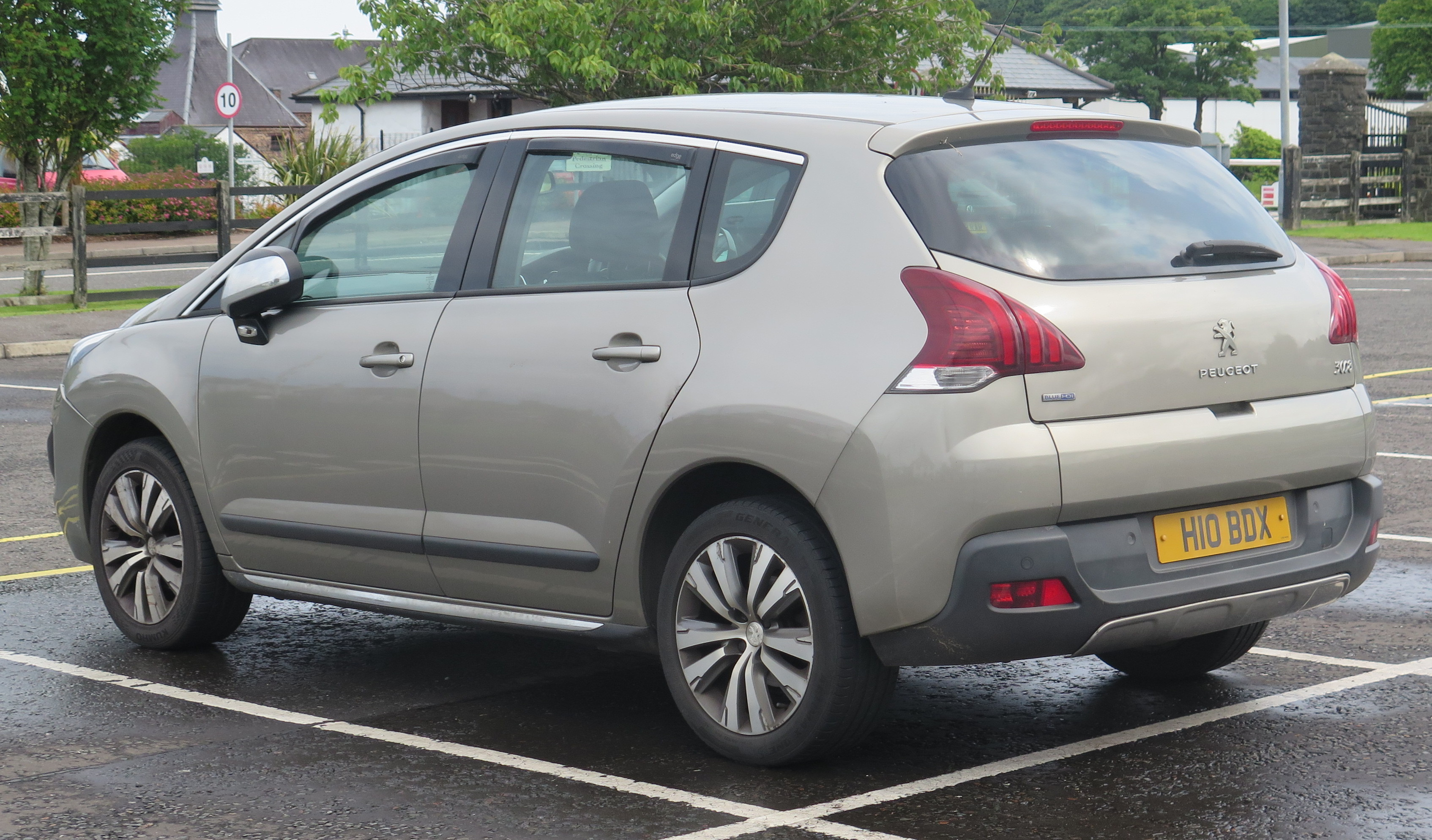
Rear

=== Chinese version ===
Pre-facelift/European imported styling From 2010 to late 2012, the 3008 was imported from Europe to China.

First facelift styling From late 2012 to 2019, Dongfeng Peugeot-Citroën Automobile starts manufacturing the 3008. The Chinese model is longer (4.43m) than the global model and has a different design.

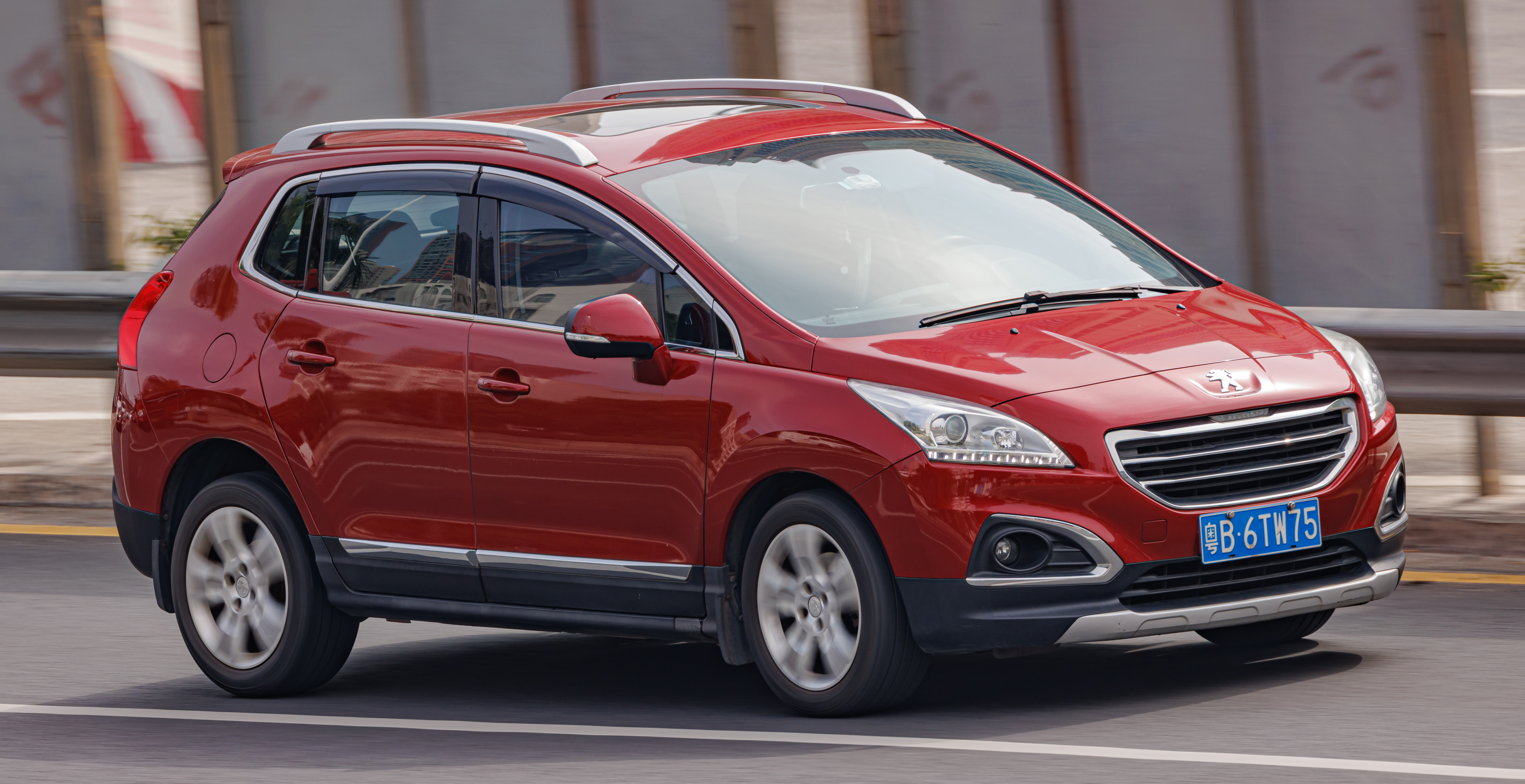
Front

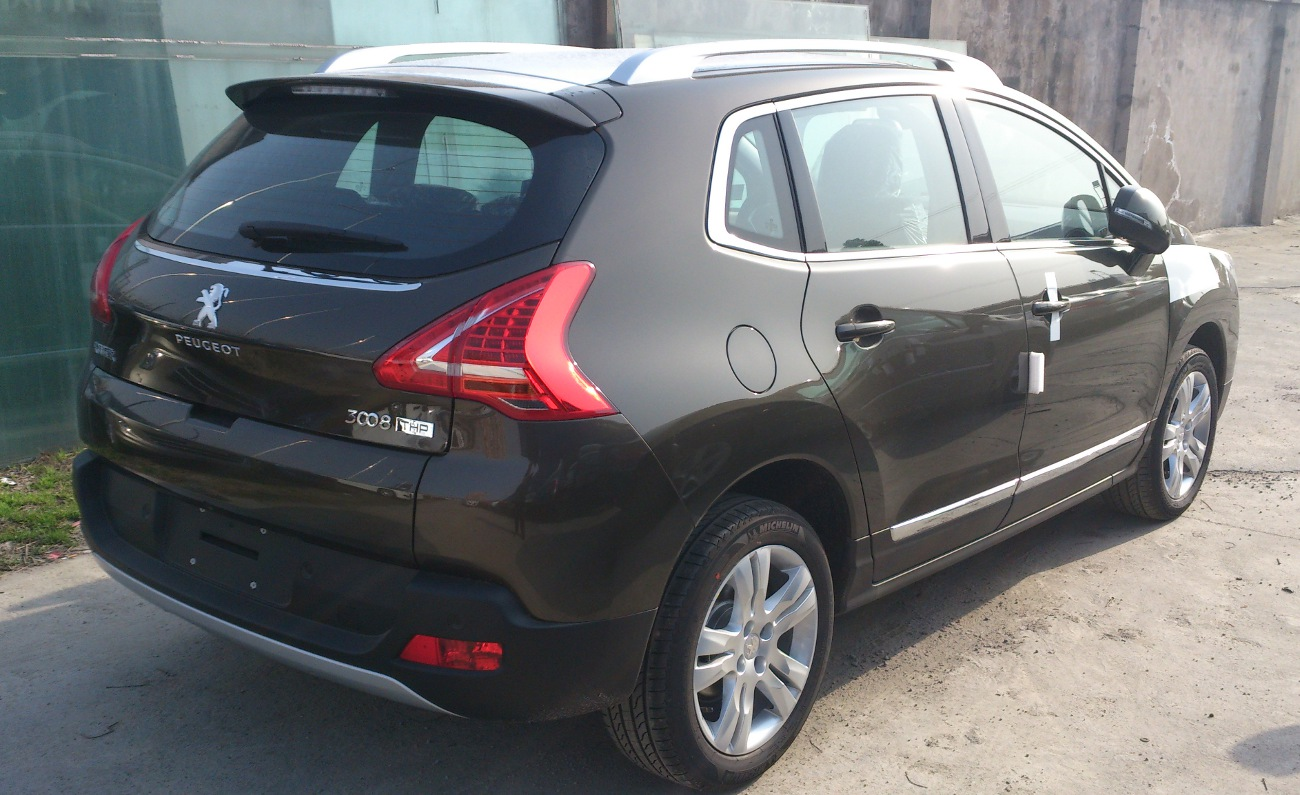
Rear

Second facelift styling

In April 2016, the Chinese 3008 got a facelift, which resulted in a more aggressive design.

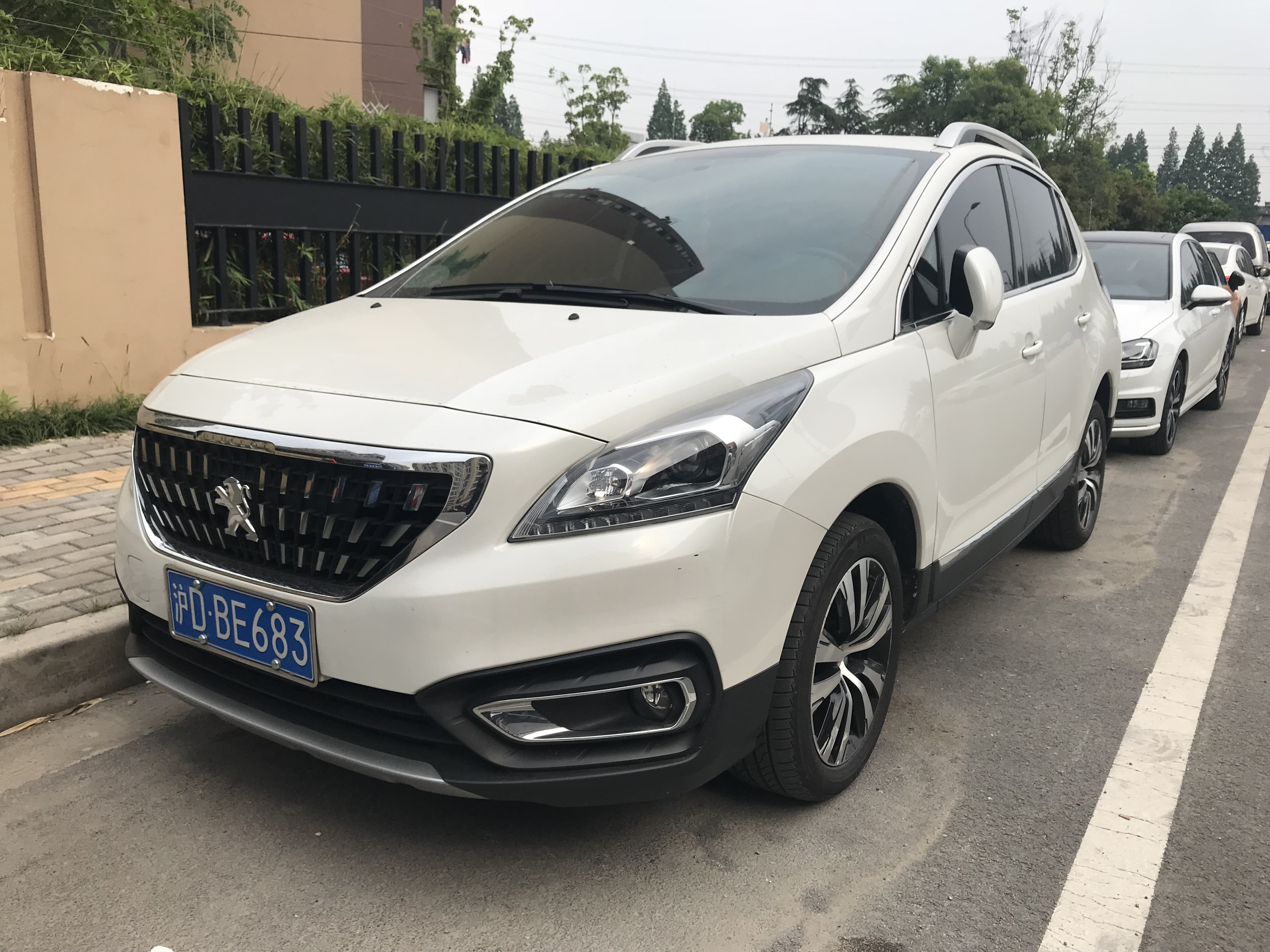
Front

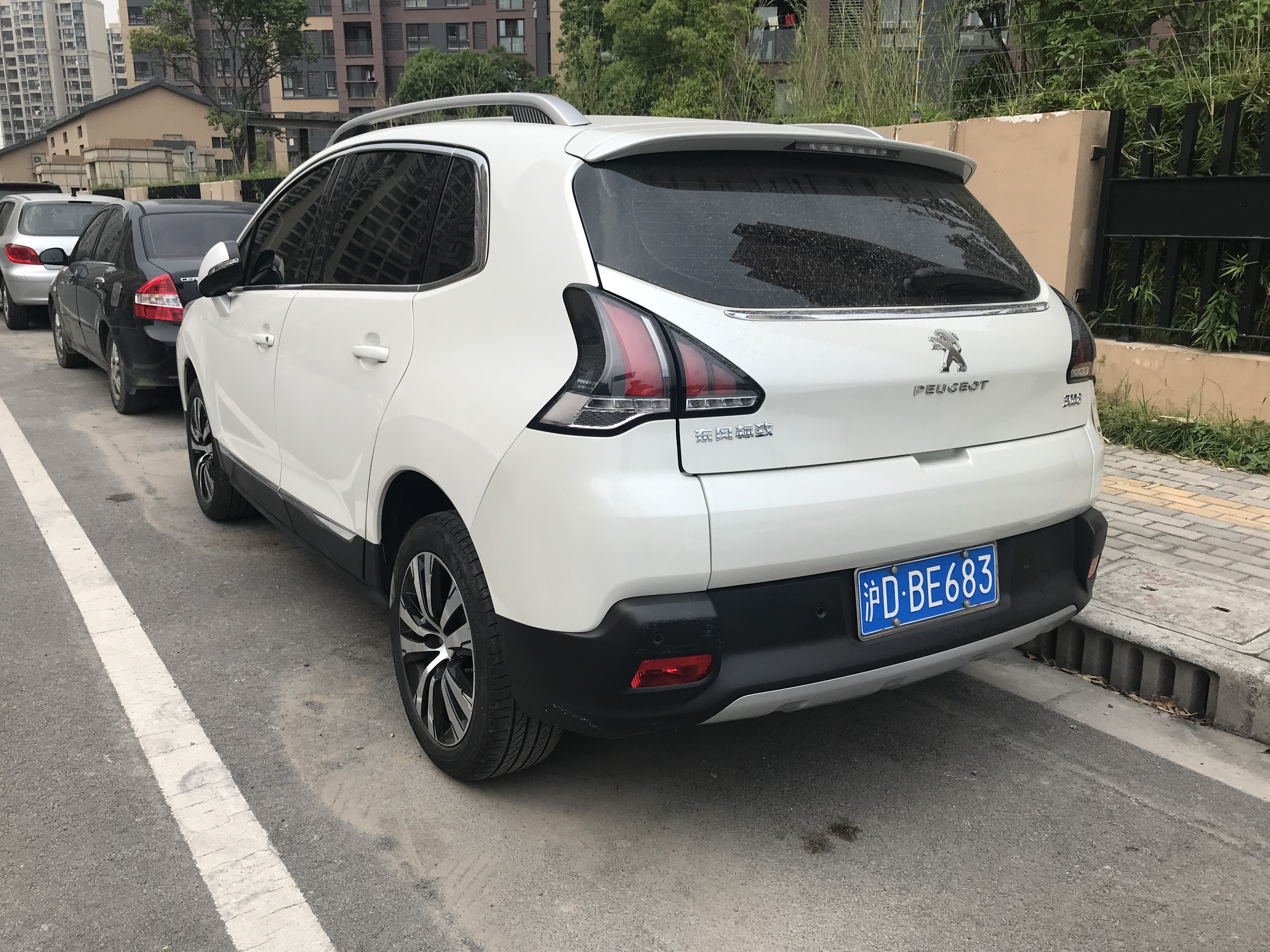
Rear

=== Safety ===
ANCAP test results Peugeot 3008 diesel variants only (2010)
Test	Score
Overall	5 /5 stars
Frontal offset	14.07/16
Side impact	16/16
Pole	2/2
Seat belt reminders	3/3
Whiplash protection	Not Assessed
Pedestrian protection	Marginal
Electronic stability control	Standard

Euro NCAP test results 5-door LHD Hatchback (2009)
Test	Points	%
Overall:	5 /5 stars	
Adult occupant:	31	86%
Child occupant:	40	81%
Pedestrian:	11	31%
Safety assist:	7	97%

== Second generation (P84; 2016) ==
Second generation
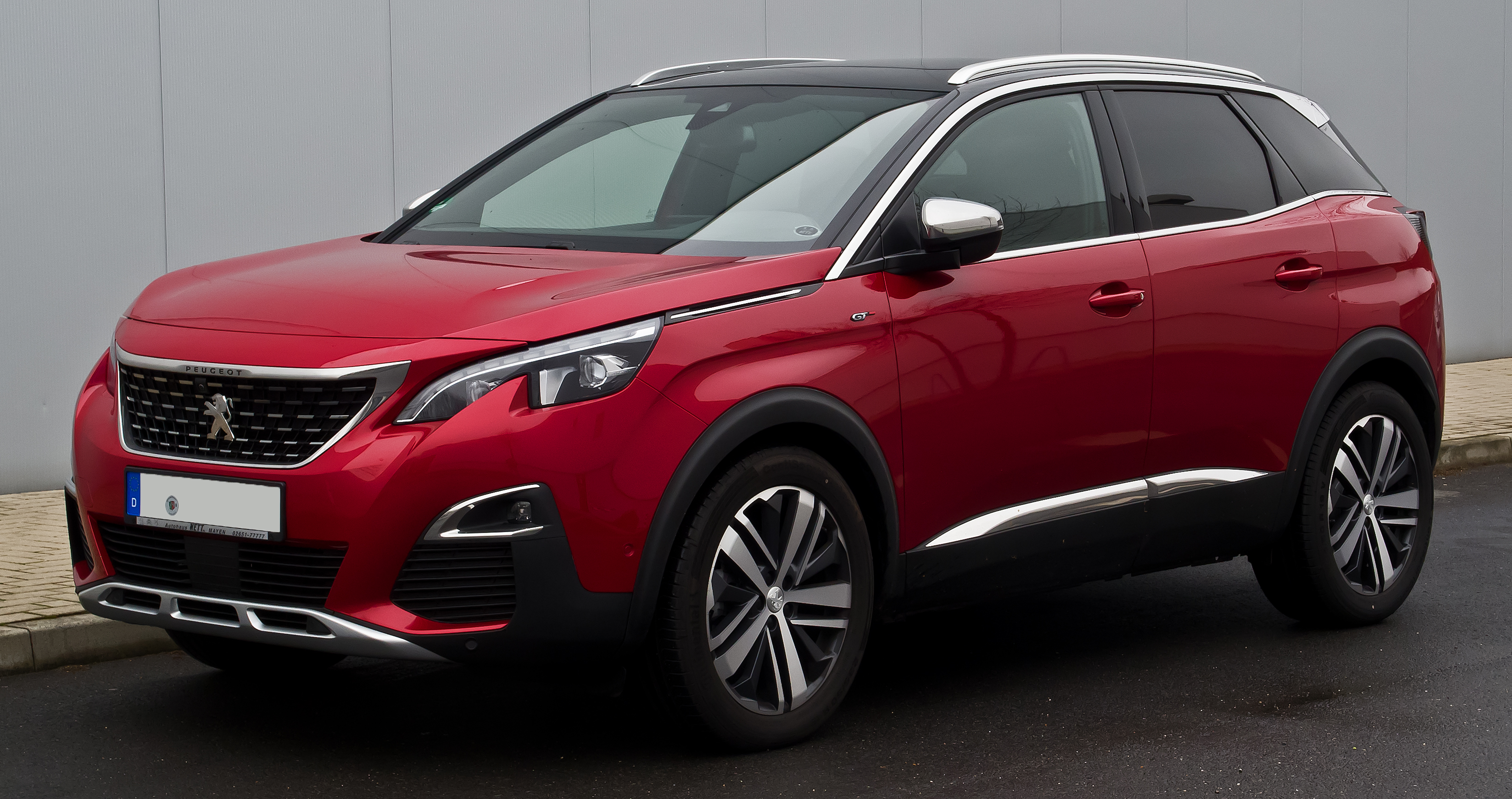
- Pre-facelift Peugeot 3008

Overview
- Model code: P84
- Also called: Peugeot 4008 (China)
- Production: October 2016 – 2024; 2016–present (China, Malaysia)
- Assembly: France: Sochaux (PSA Sochaux Plant); China: Chengdu (DPCA); Ghana: Tema (Silver Star Auto); Kenya: Thika (Kenya Vehicle Assemblers (KVM)); Namibia: Walvis Bay (Peugeot Opel Assembly Namibia (POAN); Nigeria: Kaduna (Dangote Peugeot Automobiles Nigeria Limited (DPAN)); Malaysia: Gurun (Gurun Plant); Vietnam: Chu Lai (THACO)
- Designer: Sébastien Criquet

Body and chassis
- Platform: PSA EMP2 platform
- Related: Peugeot 308 II; Peugeot 5008 II; Opel Grandland; Citroën C5 Aircross; DS 7 Crossback

Powertrain
- Engine: Petrol: 1.2 L EB2 turbo I3; 1.6 L EP6 turbo I4; MHEV: 1.2 L EB2ADTS turbo I3; PHEV: 1.6 L EP6 I4; Diesel: 1.5 L DV5 BlueHDi I4; 1.6 L DV6F BlueHDi I4; 2.0 L DW10 BlueHDi I4
- Electric motor: 1 or 2 Permanent magnet AC synchronous motor (integrated with the e-EAT8 gearbox)
- Transmission: 5-speed manual 6-speed manual 6-speed e-DCS6 Dual Clutch Transmission; 6-speed Aisin EAT-6 automatic 8-speed Aisin EAT-8 automatic
- Battery: 13.2 kWh Li-ion

Dimensions
- Wheelbase: 2,675 mm (105.3 in); 2,730 mm (107.5 in) (China, Malaysia and Vietnam production)
- Length: 4,447 mm (175.1 in); 4,510 mm (177.6 in) (China, Malaysia and Vietnam production)
- Width: 1,841 mm (72.5 in) (2,098 mm (82.6 in) including wing mirrors)
- Height: 1,615 mm (63.6 in) – 1,623 mm (63.9 in)

Chronology
- Predecessor: Peugeot 4008

The second generation 3008 was announced by Peugeot in May 2016, and was first presented to the public at the Paris Motor Show in September 2016. Its design allows the vehicle to come into contention with large competitors in the C segment market of SUVs, which has been a prominent market in the past years. Sales of the second generation 3008 began in late 2016.

It features Peugeot's new iCockpit, which is an improved design compared to the previous iCockpit featured in the Peugeot 208, Peugeot 2008 and Peugeot 308. The second generation was introduced on 23 May 2016. Features include an eight-inch touch screen to the centre console, a 12.3-inch customisable heads-up display, and the small style steering wheel, which has become standard in all models of Peugeot, at time of its unveiling.

Production started in 2016, with sales starting in January 2017. 100,000 orders were made in Europe between October 2016 and March 2017, half of them were made by people who did not own a Peugeot.

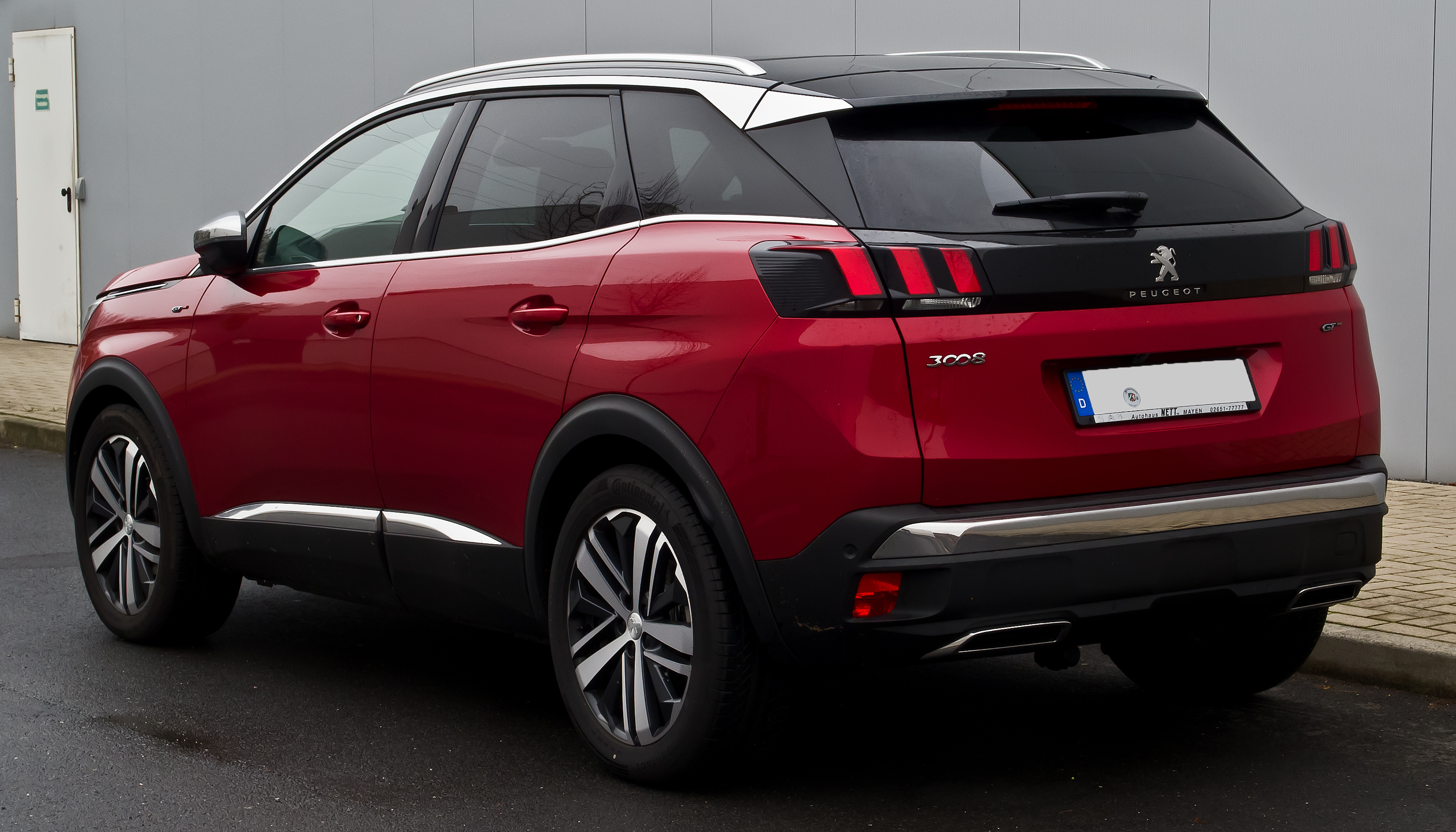
Rear view (pre-facelift)

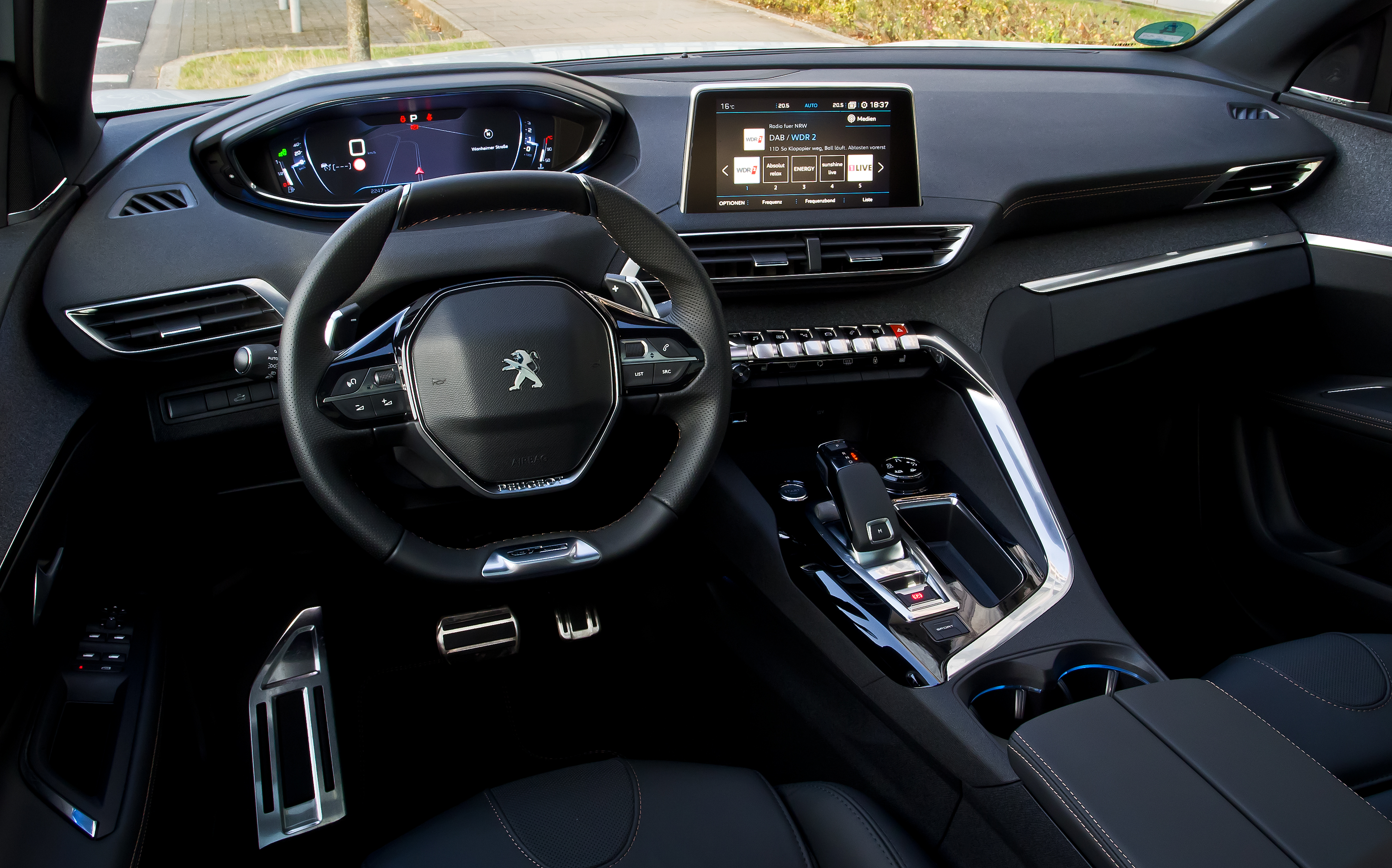
Interior

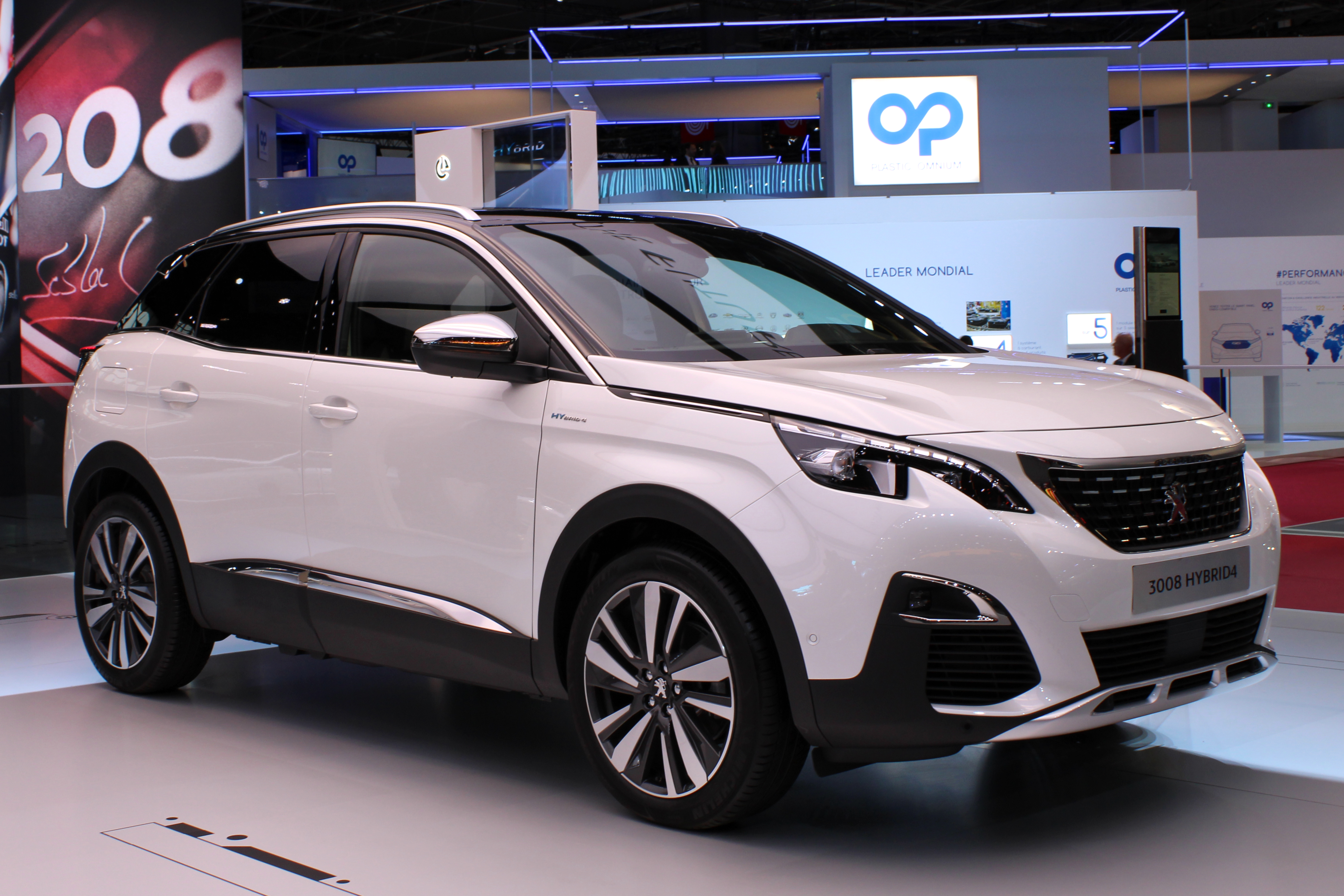
Peugeot 3008 Hybrid4

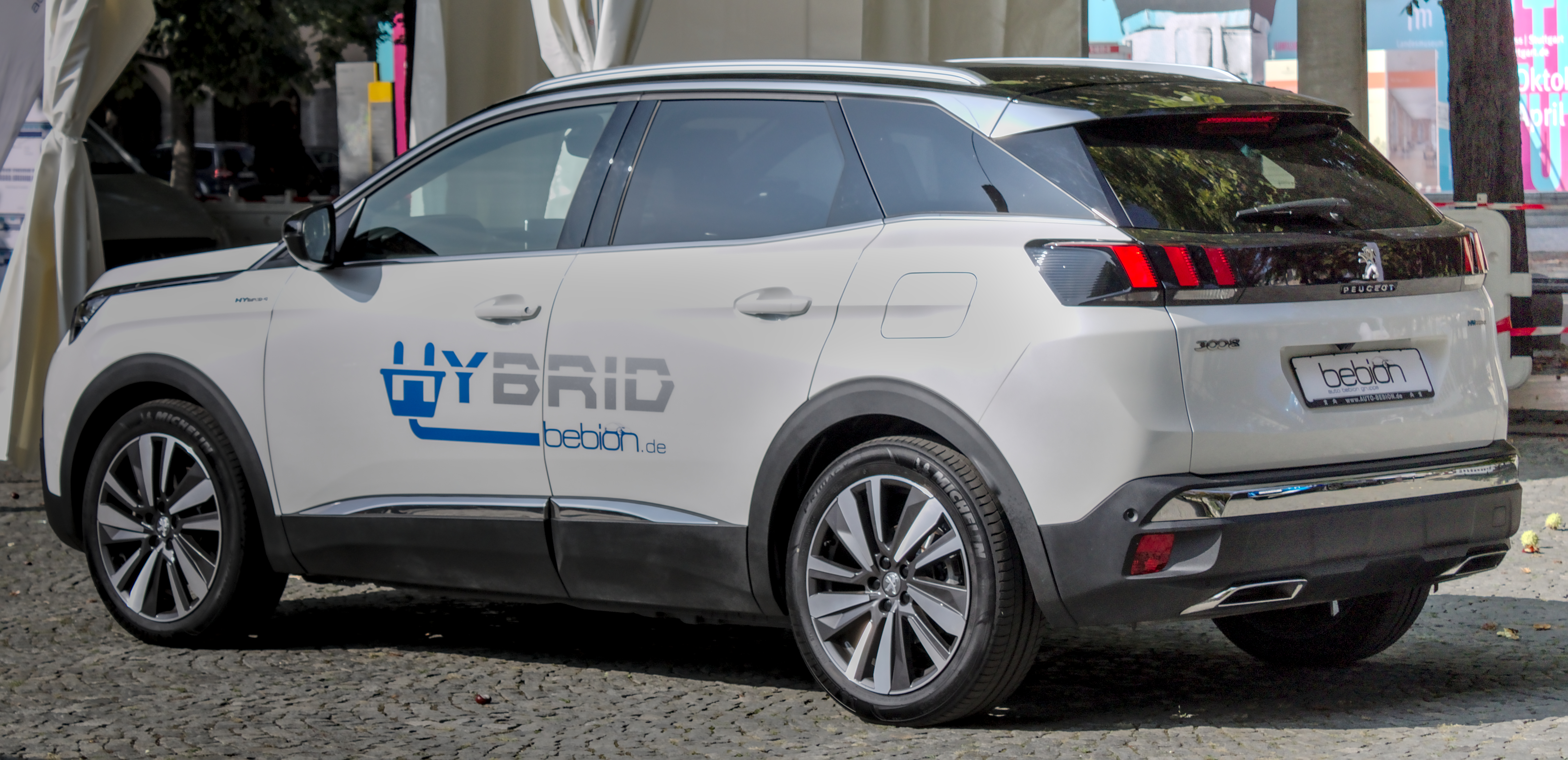
Peugeot 3008 Hybrid4

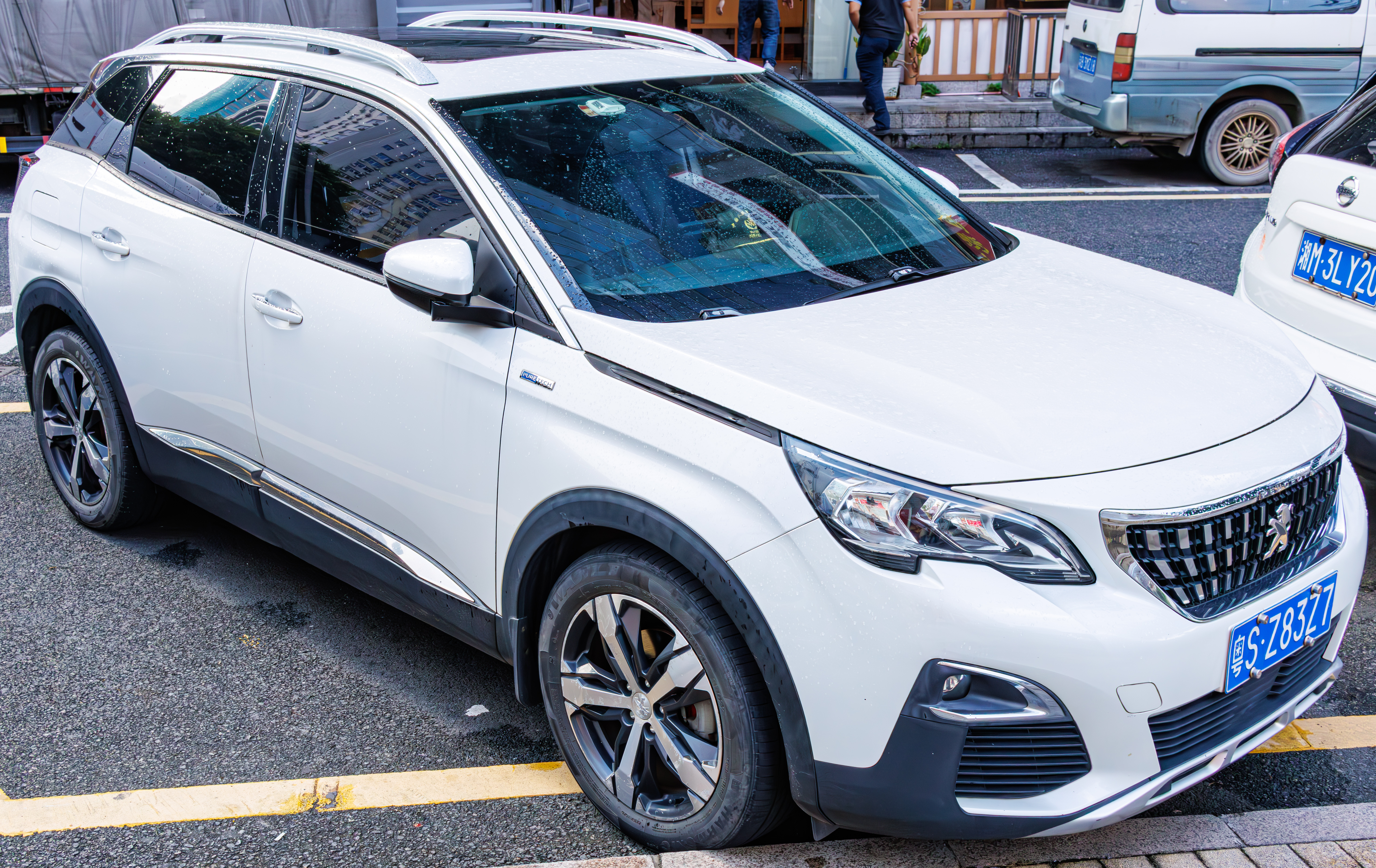
Peugeot 4008 (China)

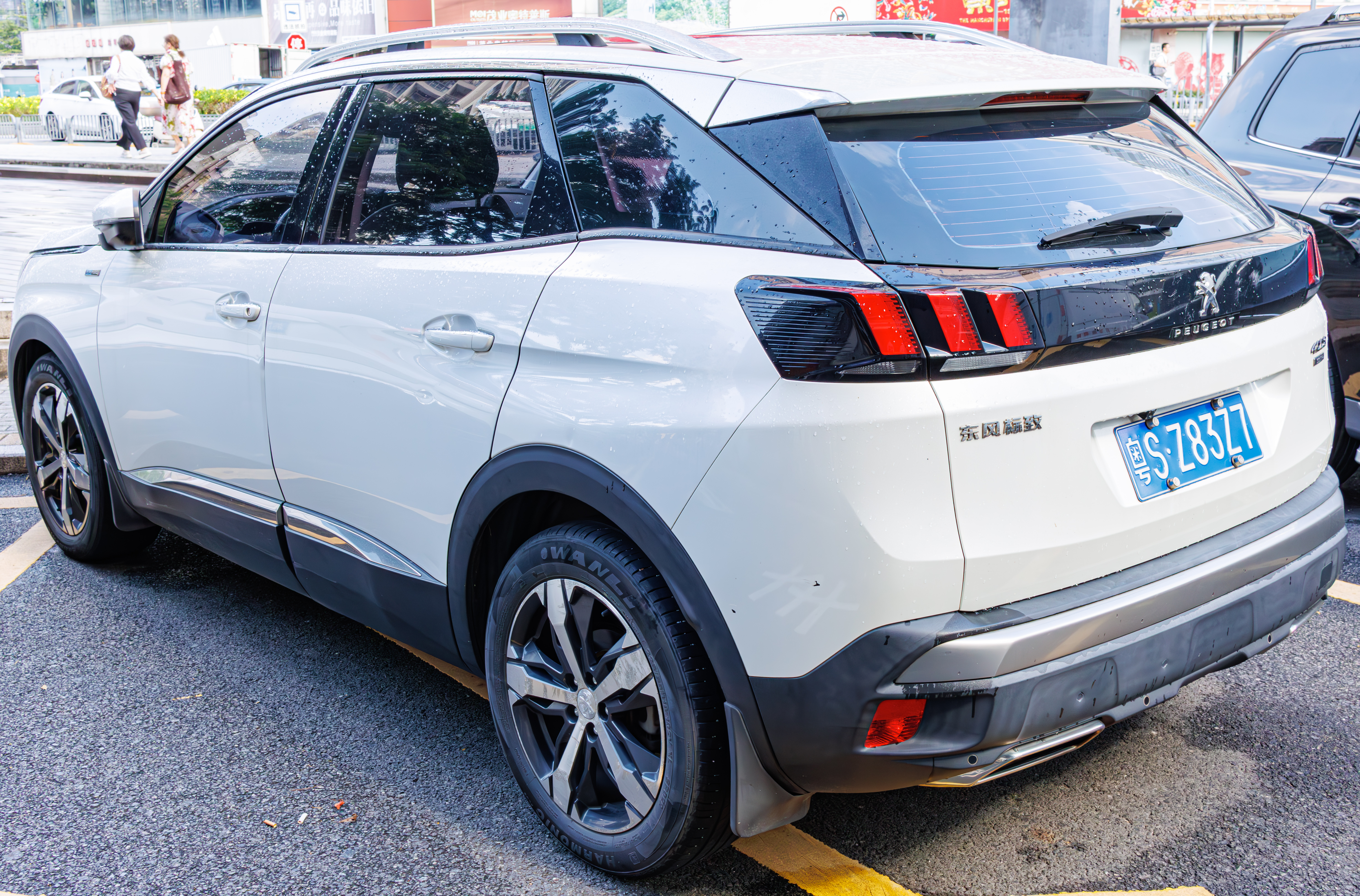
Peugeot 4008 (China)

=== 2020 facelift ===
The facelift was unveiled on 1 September 2020. Featuring new styling for the front fascia, increased technology, refreshed interior with an enlarged touchscreen and revised rear lighting.

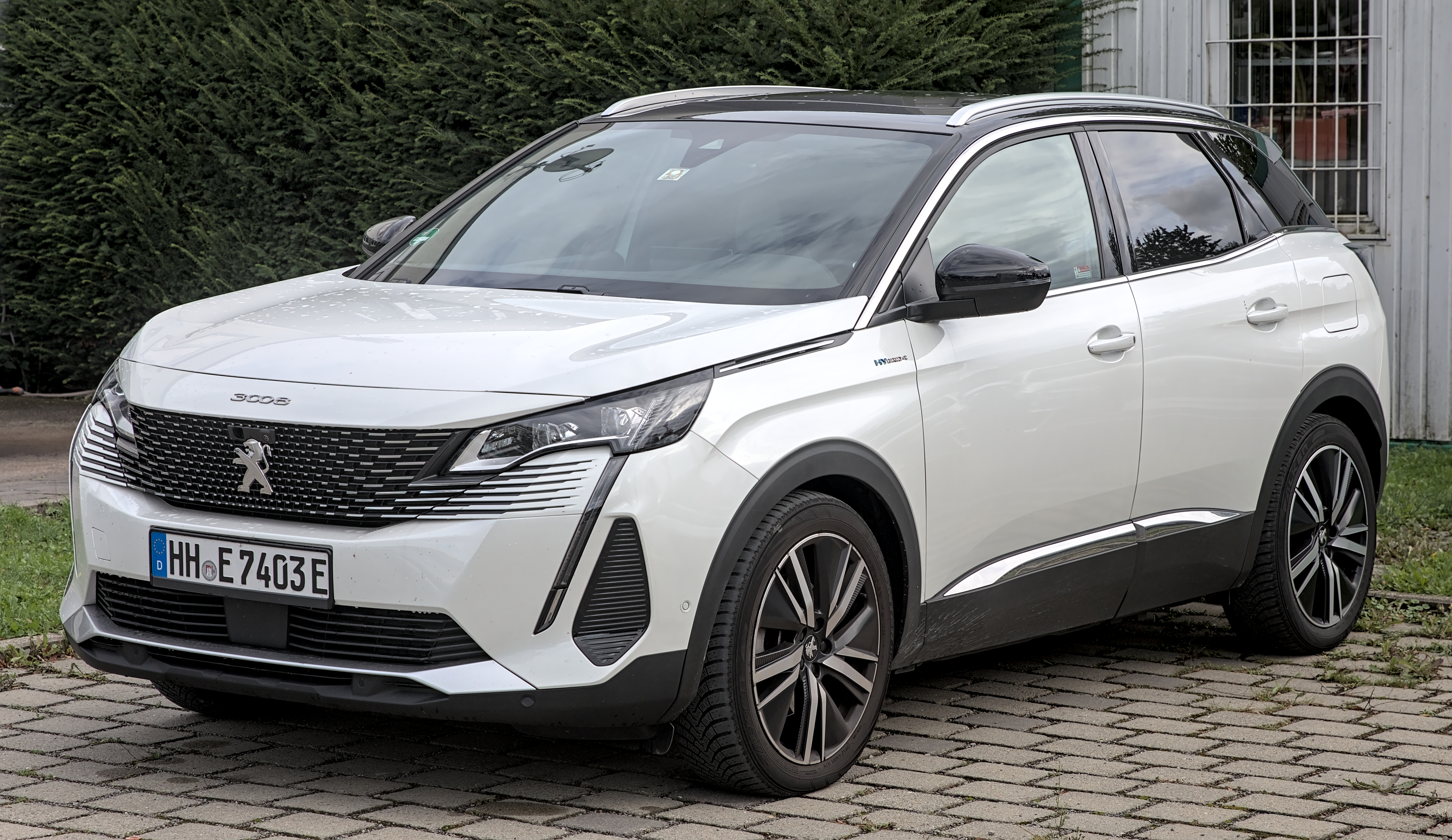
2021 Peugeot 3008

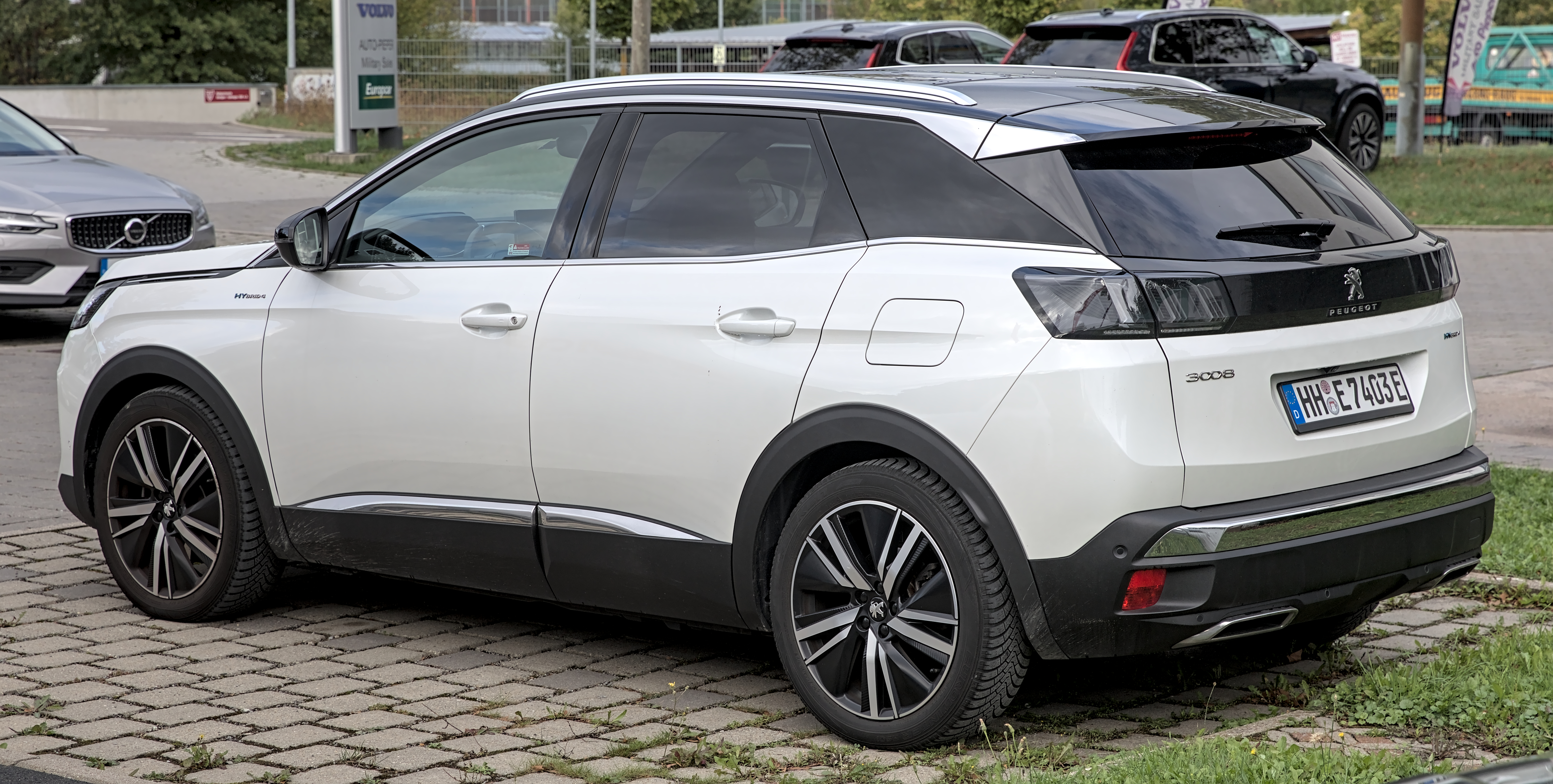
2021 Peugeot 3008

==== Hybrid ====
In February 2023, Peugeot launched the 3008 Hybrid, with the mild hybrid technology reducing fuel consumption by up to 15% compared to the petrol equivalent.

=== Safety ===
ANCAP test results Peugeot 3008 all variants (2016)
Test	Score
Overall	5 /5 stars
Frontal offset	
Side impact	
Pole	
Seat belt reminders	
Whiplash protection	
Pedestrian protection	
Electronic stability control	

Euro NCAP test results Peugeot 3008 1.6 HDi Active (2016)
Test	Points	%
Overall:	5 /5 stars	
Adult occupant:	32.9	86%
Child occupant:	42	85%
Pedestrian:	28.2	67%
Safety assist:	7	58%

=== Awards ===
In November 2016, the new 3008 was awarded overall CarBuyer "Car of the Year" 2017, as well as winning best in the category of SUVs.

Diesel Car Magazine awarded the 3008 the overall award of Car of the Year for 2017, as well as taking the honour of Best Medium SUV.

In March 2017, the new 3008 won European Car of the Year 2017, by a jury of 58 motoring journalists from twenty two European countries. The award came the same day that the PSA Group announced a $2.3 billion deal to buy GM's Opel division. Opel's Astra won the Car of the Year in 2016, reacted with these two awards within two years, the Peugeot Group CEO Jean-Philippe Imparato said, "This is an alliance of winners".

- European Car of the Year 2017
- CarBuyer Car of the Year 2017
- DieselCar Magazine Car of the Year 2017
- DieselCar Magazine Best Medium SUV 2017

== Third generation (P64; 2024) ==
Third generation
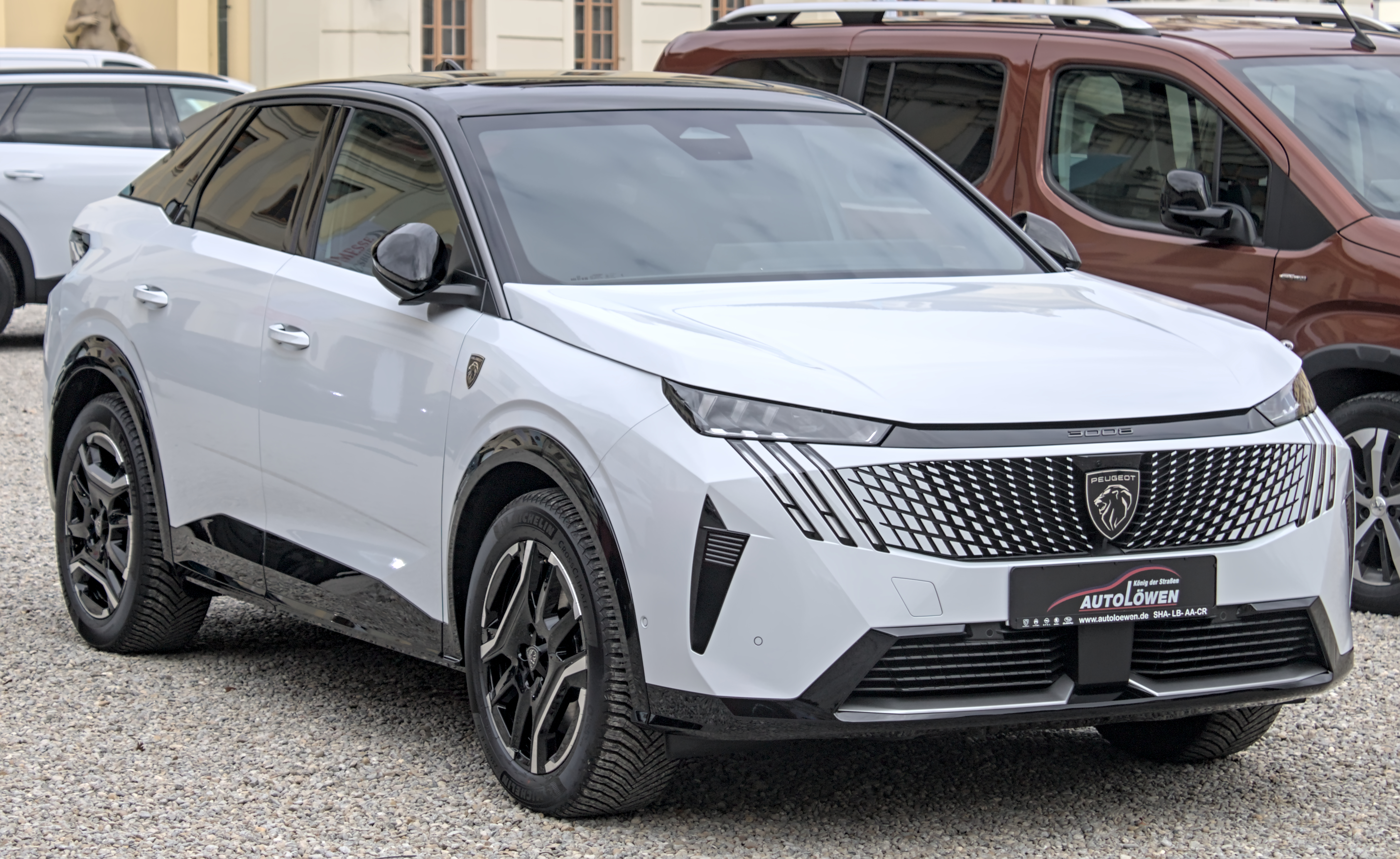

Overview
- Model code: P64
- Also called: Peugeot e-3008 (electric version)
- Production: 2024–present
- Assembly: France: Sochaux (PSA Sochaux Plant)

Body and chassis
- Body style: 5-door SUV
- Layout: Front-engine, front-wheel-drive; Front-motor, front-wheel drive; Dual-motor, all-wheel drive
- Platform: STLA Medium
- Related: Peugeot 5008 III; Opel Grandland II

Powertrain
- Engine: Petrol: 1.2 L EB2LTEDH2 turbo I3; 1.6 L EP6FADTXD turbo I4
- Electric motor: 1 or 2 Permanent magnet AC synchronous motor
- Transmission: 6-speed DCT; 7-speed DCT; 1-speed direct-drive fixed gear ratio (e-3008)
- Hybrid drivetrain: Mild hybrid (MHEV); Plug-in hybrid (PHEV)
- Battery: Lithium-ion NMC: 0.43 kWh (Hybrid); 17.9 kWh (Plug-in Hybrid); 73 - 96.9 kWh (e-3008)
- Electric range: 87 km (54 mi) (PHEV); 375–500 km (233–311 mi) (e-3008)

Dimensions
- Wheelbase: 2,739 mm (107.8 in)
- Length: 4,540 mm (178.7 in)
- Width: 1,890 mm (74.4 in)
- Height: 1,640 mm (64.6 in)

The third generation 3008 was officially revealed on 12 September 2023, sales commenced in February 2024 for the mild-hybrid versions and the electrified versions are due in the second half of the year. It is the first vehicle based on the Stellantis' STLA Medium platform. The e-3008 versions are manufactured exclusively at the PSA Sochaux Plant, along with its battery pack.

=== Overview ===
Compared to its predecessors, the third generation 3008 had evolved into a coupe SUV with aerodynamic shape at (Cx 0.28). There are the brand's signature 'Claw Effect' lighting front and rear using Peugeot's new Pixel LED lighting technology, an enlarged logo on grille, and the traditional slope of a fastback with a floating spoiler inspired by the Quartz Concept.

The 3008 is the first model to feature Peugeot's Panoramic i-Cockpit that combines curved 21-inch HD panoramic screen that combines the head-up display, driver's instrument cluster and the central touchscreen into a single piece. There is an extra touchscreen for the iToggles ten customisable touchscreen shortcut buttons. Other items include touch-sensitive steering wheel controls with a tactile clicking feature and the gear selector has been moved to the dashboard.

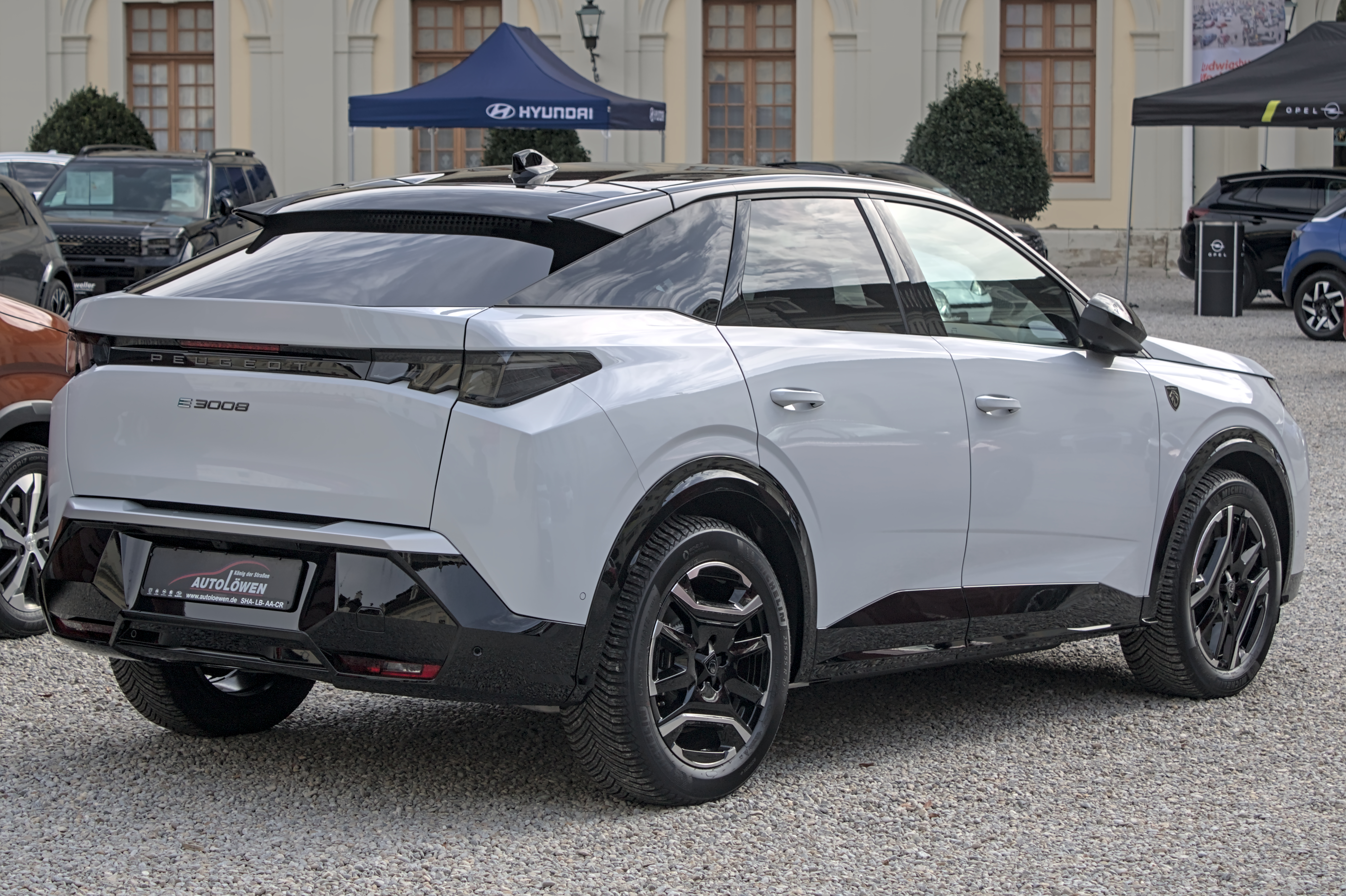
Rear view

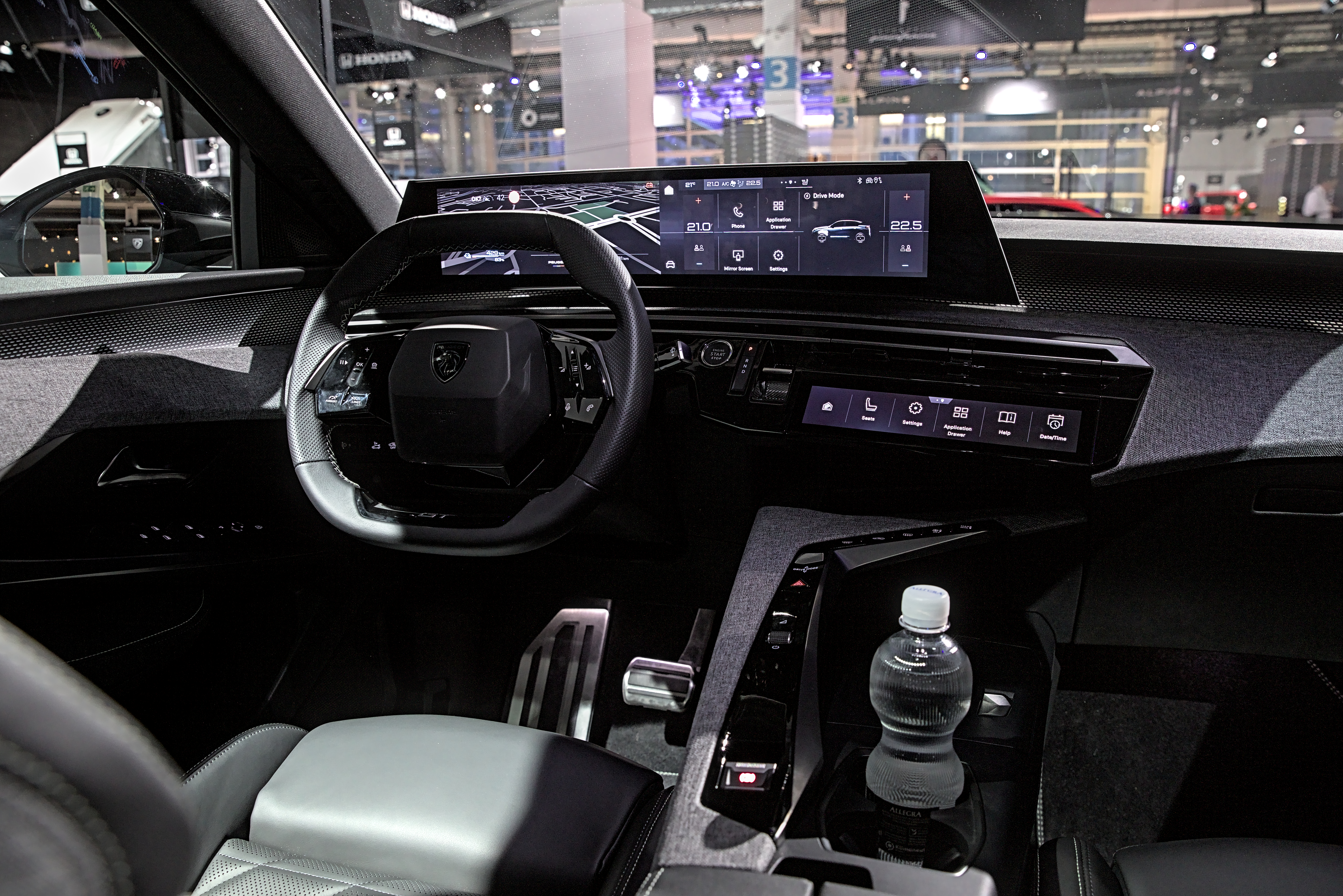
Interior

=== Powertrains ===
Model	Type	Battery	Displacement	Power	Torque	Combined system output	0–100 km/h (0–62 mph)	Top speed	Trans.	Layout
Mild hybrid engines
1.2 Hybrid 145	1.2 L PSA EB2DTS Turbo I3	0.43 kWh Li-NMC battery	1,199 cc (1.2 L; 73.2 cu in)	136 PS (134 hp; 100 kW) @ 5,500 rpm Motor: 21 PS (21 hp; 15 kW)	230 N⋅m (170 lb⋅ft) @ 1,750 rpm Motor: 51 N⋅m (38 lb⋅ft)	145 PS (143 hp; 107 kW)	10.2 s	201 km/h (125 mph)	6-speed dual-clutch transmission (e-DCS6)	FWD
Plug-in hybrid engines
1.6 Plug-In Hybrid 195	1.6 L PSA EP6FADTXD Turbo I4	17.9 kWh Li-NMC battery	1,598 cc (1.6 L; 97.5 cu in)	150 PS (148 hp; 110 kW) @ 5,500 rpm Motor: 125 PS (123 hp; 92 kW)	300 N⋅m (220 lb⋅ft) @ 2,000 rpm Motor: 118 N⋅m (87 lb⋅ft)	195 PS (192 hp; 143 kW)	7.8 s	220 km/h (140 mph)	7-speed dual-clutch transmission (e-DCS7)	FWD
Electric models
Model	Battery		Transmission	Range (WLTP)	Power		Torque	0–100 km/h (0–62 mph)	Top speed	Drive
Electric 210	73 kWh Lithium-ion NMC (1x)		1-speed direct-drive	380 km (240 mi)	210 hp (213 PS; 157 kW)		345 N⋅m (254 lb⋅ft)	8.8 s	170 km/h (110 mph)	FWD
Electric 320 Dual Motor	73 kWh Lithium-ion NMC (2x)		1-speed direct-drive	375 km (233 mi)	322 hp (326 PS; 240 kW)		511 N⋅m (377 lb⋅ft)	6.4 s	170 km/h (110 mph)	AWD
Electric 230 Long Range	96.9 kWh Lithium-ion NMC (1x)		1-speed direct-drive	500 km (310 mi)	228 hp (231 PS; 170 kW)		345 N⋅m (254 lb⋅ft)	8.7 s	170 km/h (110 mph)	FWD

=== Safety ===
ANCAP test results Peugeot 3008 all Australian variants (2025, aligned with Euro NCAP)
Test	Points	%
Overall:	5 /5 stars	
Adult occupant:	33.09	82%
Child occupant:	43	87%
Pedestrian:	50.19	79%
Safety assist:	11.72	65%

Euro NCAP test results Peugeot e-3008 73kWh (LHD) (2025)
Test	Points	%
Overall:	4 /5 stars	
Adult occupant:	33.1	82%
Child occupant:	42	85%
Pedestrian:	50.2	79%
Safety assist:	11.3	62%

== Sales ==
Year	Europe (Note: Europe: 2020 EU 27 + UK + Switzerland + Norway + Iceland)	Brazil	Mexico	Turkey	China		
Year	Europe	Brazil	Mexico	Turkey	3008	4008	4008 NEV
2008	153						—
2009	48,711						—
2010	115,528	248					—
2011	115,906	2,410					—
2012	95,393	1,381					—
2013	81,398	1,240			52,318		—
2014	78,215	767			67,791		—
2015	67,079	495			67,501		—
2016	75,032	153			44,293	9,002	—
2017	168,356	861			18,585	51,832	—
2018	202,389	2,845	1,017		3,719	31,859	—
2019	194,763	2,368	1,248		2,634	19,193	—
2020	125,440	1,130	975	12,593	—	7,959	124
2021	140,015	671	1,153	9,172	—	15,168	155
2022	106,752	812	998	8,983	—	13,829	26
2023		429	2,045	18,048	—	6,912	12
2024		110		16,221	—	3,963	—
2025					—	883	—
