= Punch Powertrain =

Belgian automotive powertrain manufacturer

- Type: Private
- Industry: Automotive
- Founded: 1972
- Headquarters: Sint-Truiden, Belgium
- Area served: Europe, India, China, Malaysia and other Asian markets
- Products: Continuously variable transmissions, dual-clutch transmissions, hybrid and electric powertrains, inverters
- Website: punchpowertrain.com

Punch Powertrain is a Belgian manufacturer of automotive powertrain systems based in Sint-Truiden. It produces transmissions and propulsion systems for passenger cars and commercial vehicles, including continuously variable transmissions (CVTs), dual-clutch transmissions (DCTs), and hybrid and electric powertrains systems. Established in 1972 as a transmission manufacturing facility for the Dutch automaker DAF, the company operated under several owners before adopting its current name in 2006. It was acquired by the Chinese conglomerate Yinyi Group in 2016.

== History ==
=== Origins ===
The plant in Sint-Truiden began in 1972 as a transmission operation of DAF and produced continuously variable transmissions based on DAF's Variomatic design. It later became part of Volvo's operations and was subsequently owned by the German transmission manufacturer ZF. In 2006, the Belgian industrial holding Punch International, controlled by entrepreneur Guido Dumarey, acquired the plant and renamed it Punch Powertrain.

=== Acquisition by Yinyi ===
In 2016, the Yinyi Group, a Ningbo-based Chinese conglomerate with interests in real estate and manufacturing, acquired full ownership of Punch Powertrain for about one billion euros from its previous shareholders. By 2018, the company produced almost one million transmissions a year, mostly for Asian automakers. Yinyi later experienced financial difficulties linked to the Chinese real-estate market, and the business was reorganised into Sensteed Hi-Tech Group, which became the company's owner.

=== Joint venture with PSA and Stellantis ===
Groupe PSA selected Punch Powertrain as a supplier of electrified transmission technology in 2018. The two companies established the joint venture Punch Powertrain PSA e-transmissions, which began operations on 17 September 2020, with Punch Powertrain holding a 61% stake and PSA 39%. The joint venture initially focused on the DT2 dual-clutch transmission for mild-hybrid and plug-in hybrid vehicles. A second, assembly-focused joint venture was established earlier in 2020 at PSA's plant in Metz, France.

After PSA merged into Stellantis in 2021, Stellantis increased its investment in the joint venture, raising its holding to 60% while Punch Powertrain's share fell to 40%. In 2023, Punch Powertrain began producing eDCT components for Stellantis hybrid vehicles at its Sint-Truiden facility, with final assembly taking place in Metz, France, and Mirafiori, Italy.

In January 2025, Stellantis agreed to acquire full control of the joint venture, which produced dual-clutch transmissions for hybrid and plug-in hybrid vehicles.

== Operations ==
Punch Powertrain is headquartered in Sint-Truiden, Belgium, where it operates research, development, testing, and manufacturing facilities. In 2023, the facility began producing components for the e-DCT transmission developed for Stellantis' hybrid and plug-in hybrid vehicles. Development and testing of the transmission are also carried out at the site, while final assembly takes place at facilities in Metz, France, and Mirafiori, Italy.

The Sint-Truiden facility underwent an investment programme in 2023 that included €9.5 million for a new test centre and €45 million for manufacturing equipment. The company also planned to recruit 250 additional employees as part of the expansion.

In Malaysia, Punch Powertrain manufactures powertrain systems through Sensteed Powertrain Solutions. The facility supplies Proton and other automotive manufacturers in Malaysia and exports to overseas customers.

In India, Punch Powertrain entered into a licensing agreement with Tata AutoComp Systems in 2022 for the local manufacture of dual-clutch transmissions. Production began in 2023 at a transmission manufacturing facility in Chakan, Maharashtra.

== Products ==
Punch Powertrain develops and manufactures automotive transmission and powertrain systems, including continuously variable transmissions (CVTs), dual-clutch transmissions (DCTs), hybrid powertrains, and electric propulsion systems.

The company began developing a full-hybrid powertrain based on its CVT technology in 2007. In a technical paper presented at the SAE 2010 World Congress & Exhibition, its engineers described the development and testing of the hybrid system, including its powertrain architecture, control strategy, electric motor, and battery systems.

Punch Powertrain's DT1 dual-clutch transmission entered serial production in India in 2022, with the Tata Altroz DCA as its first application. The wet-clutch transmission was designed for compact vehicles. The company has also developed a Dedicated Hybrid Transmission (DHT) system for hybrid electric vehicles, with configurations incorporating one or two electric motors.

In January 2025, Punch Powertrain announced the IV5, an 800-volt silicon-carbide inverter designed for electric drive units, with a scalable output range from 200 kW to more than 400 kW.
