= Kia Soul EV =

Battery electric subcompact crossover hatchback (2014-2024)

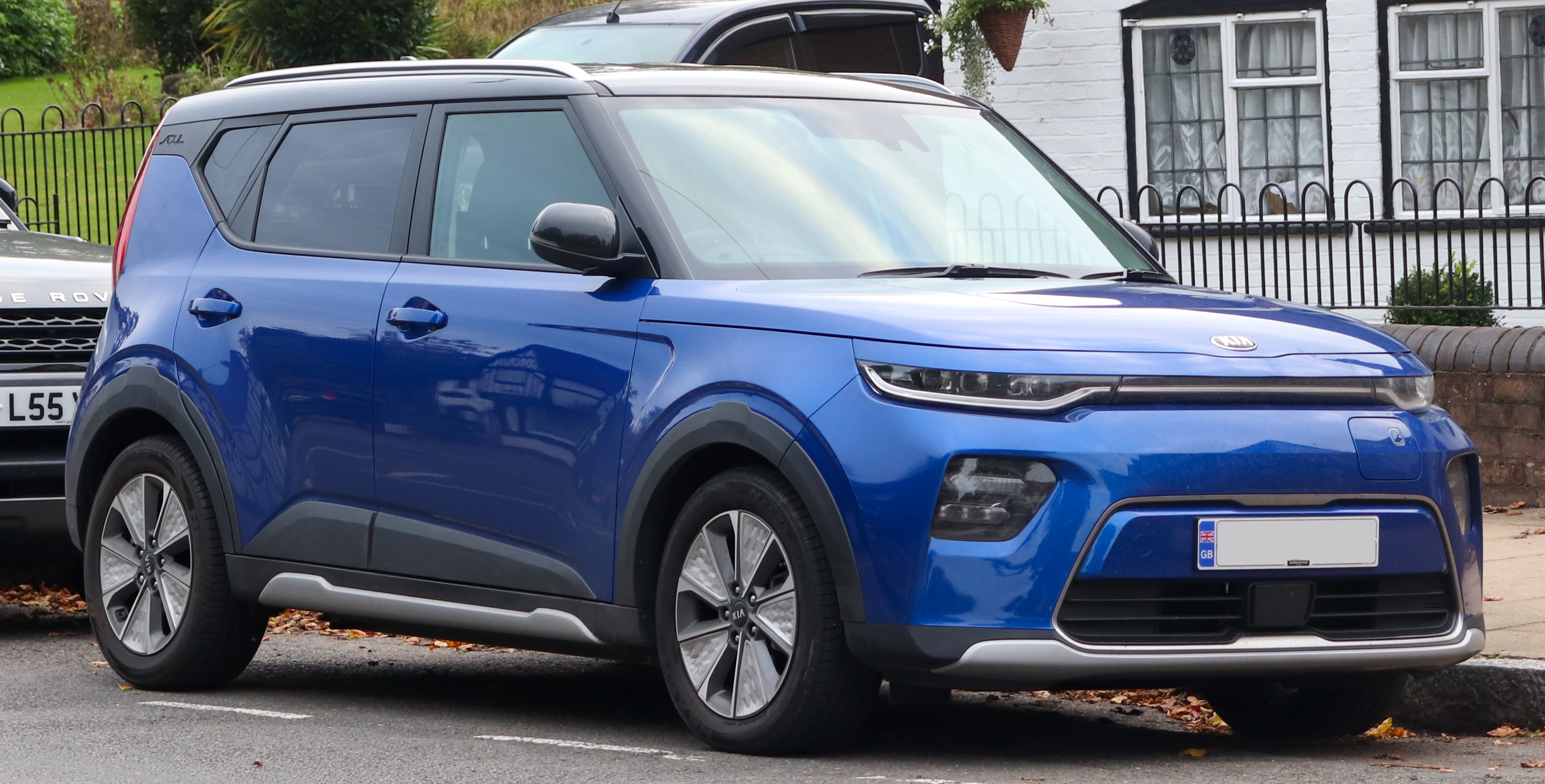
- Second generation

Overview
- Manufacturer: Kia
- Also called: Kia e-Soul (Europe)
- Production: 2014–2024
- Assembly: South Korea: Gwangju (Gwangju Plant)

Body and chassis
- Class: Subcompact crossover SUV
- Body style: 4-door hatchback
- Layout: Front-motor, front-wheel-drive
- Related: Kia Soul

Powertrain
- Engine: Permanent Magnet AC Synchronous Electric Motor
- Electric motor: 2015–2019: 81.4 kW (109 hp) 2020–2024: 150 kW (201 hp) (Note: First-gen: 81.4kW (109bhp)/201 hp (204 PS), torque 285 Nm (210 lb.-ft) to 291 lb.-ft (395 Nm))
- Battery: Lithium-ion polymer battery 2015–2017: 30.5 kW·h 2018–2020: 31.8 kW·h 2020–2024: 64 kW·h (Note: First-gen: 30.5 kW·h lithium-ion polymer battery, 27 kW·h usable)
- Range: 2015–2017: 93 mi (150 km) 2018–2020: 111 mi (179 km) 2020–2024: 243 mi (391 km)

Chronology
- Successor: Kia EV3 (Global); Kia EV2 (Europe)

The Kia Soul EV, also known as Kia e-Soul, is a battery electric subcompact crossover hatchback manufactured by Kia, produced from 2014 to 2024. It is the battery electric variant of the Soul.

Deliveries of the first generation began in South Korea in May 2014. European sales began in July 2014. Sales started in the U.S. in October 2014; initially it was sold only in California, Oregon, and several Eastern states with the largest EV markets and infrastructure including New York, New Jersey and Maryland. Global sales exceeded the 10,000 unit milestone in January 2016, with Europe as the leading market with 6,770 units sold. Germany was the leading European market with 3,853 units sold through December 2015.

A second-generation model was introduced in 2019 for the 2020 model year, sold in both Europe and Canada. It was delayed until 2021 for the US market.

The US Environmental Protection Agency (EPA) official range for the second-generation Soul EV is 243 miles (391 km).

== History ==
In 2013, Kia began testing prototype versions of a Soul electric vehicle. In November 2013, Kia announced that it would be producing a Soul EV, with sales scheduled to begin in 2014. The vehicle was unveiled at the 2014 Chicago Auto Show. The first-generation Soul EV was based on the second-generation Kia Soul.

=== First generation ===
A 27 kWh lithium-ion polymer battery pack powered the first-generation Soul EV and 30 kWh powered the 2018 model year. It is capable of 100 kW DC CHAdeMO rapid charging. The US Environmental Protection Agency (EPA) official range for the 2015 model year Soul EV is 93 mi (150 km) and rated it at 105 MPGe (2.2 L/100 km equivalent) combined. As of September 2014, the Soul EV had the largest EPA-rated all-electric range in city driving of its class, at 104 mi (167 km). The motor is rated at 81.4 kW (109 bhp) and 285 Nm (210 lb.-ft).

For the 2018 model year, Kia announced a small 11% battery upgrade. By adding 8 cells to the pack, the usable cell capacity increased from 37.5 Ah to 40 Ah out of 42.4 Ah, increasing the battery pack storage capacity to 30 kWh.

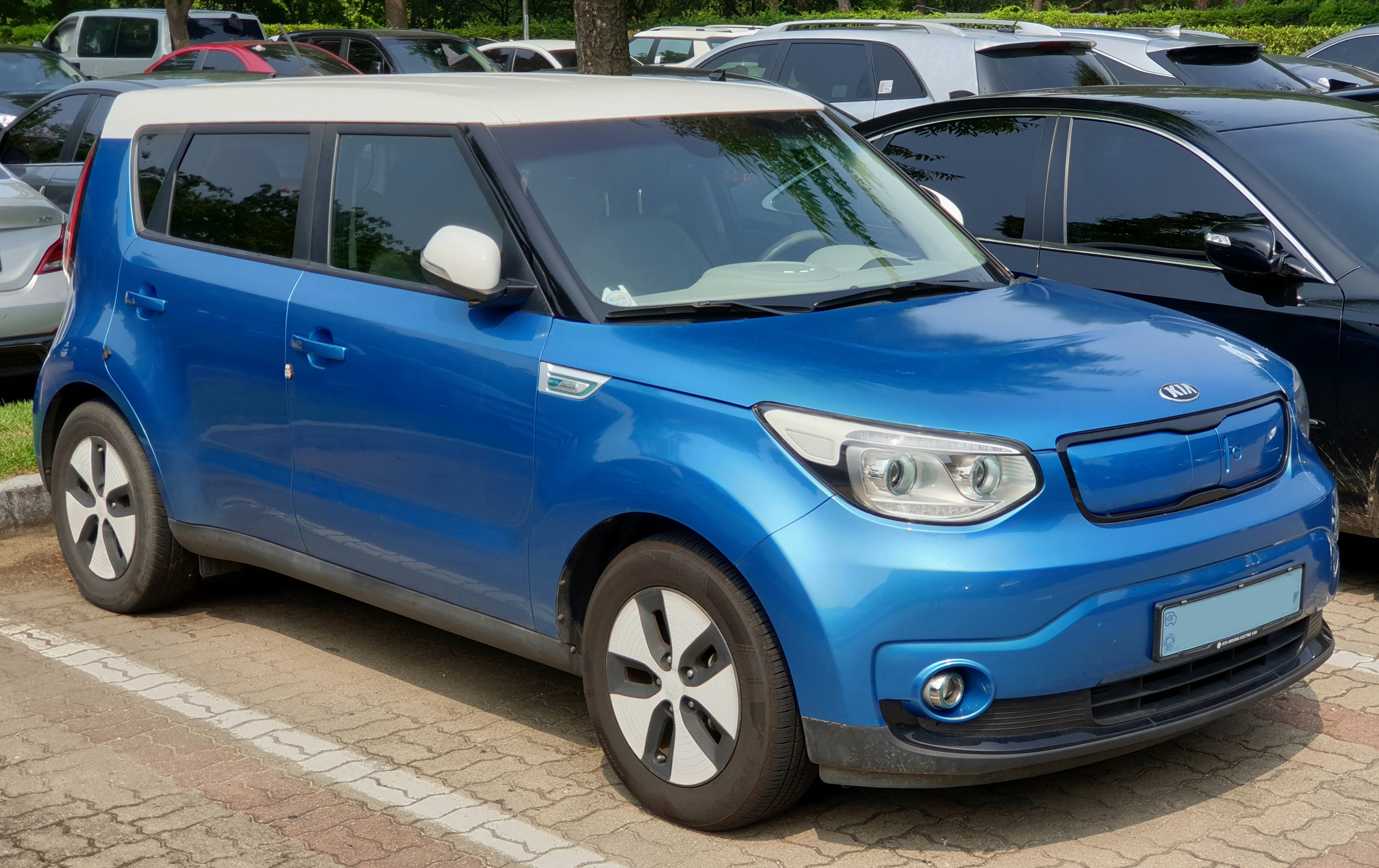
First generation (South Korea)

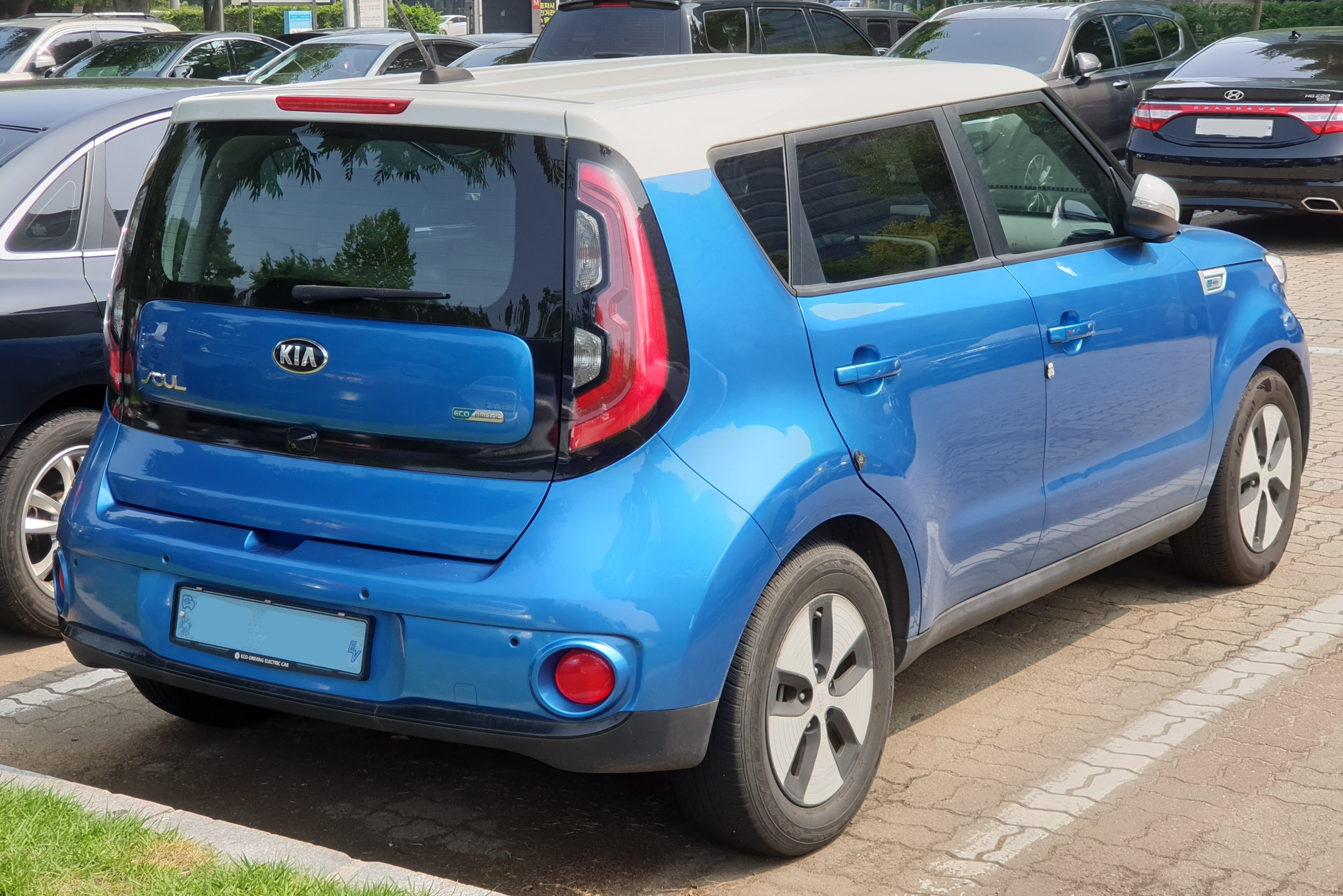
First generation (South Korea)

=== Second generation ===
For the 2020 model year, Kia announced a significant battery upgrade to a 64 kWh LiPo battery pack, doubling capacity and range from the previous generation. With a redesign, the EV will be the only variant to be offered in Europe while only the gasoline version is offered in the US for MY2020 and onwards. Both gasoline and EV versions continue to be offered in Canada.

The motor is rated at 201 hp.

This vehicle is the third in the series of long-range EVs put on the market by Hyundai-Kia, after the Hyundai Kona Electric and the Kia Niro EV.

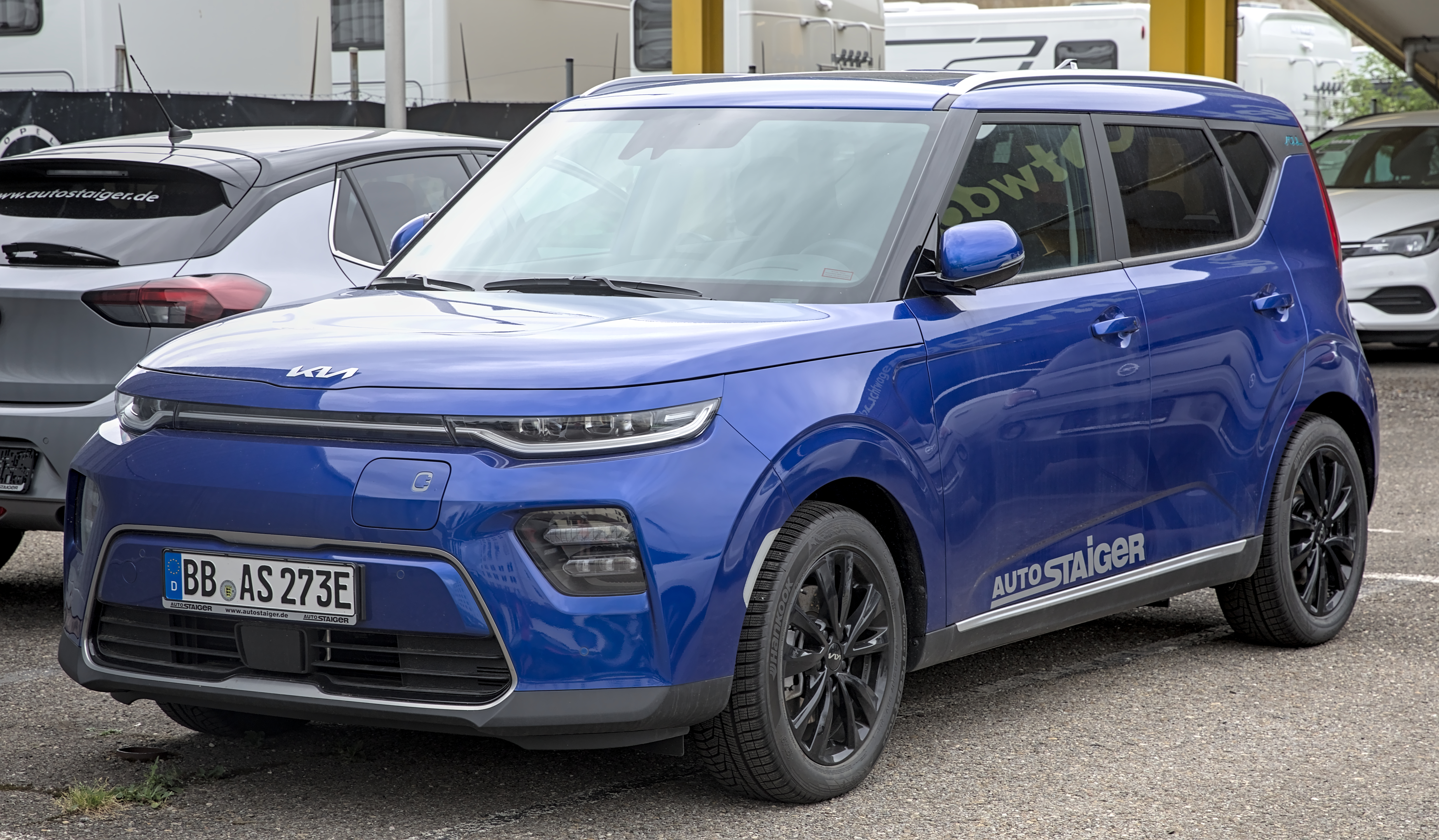
Second generation

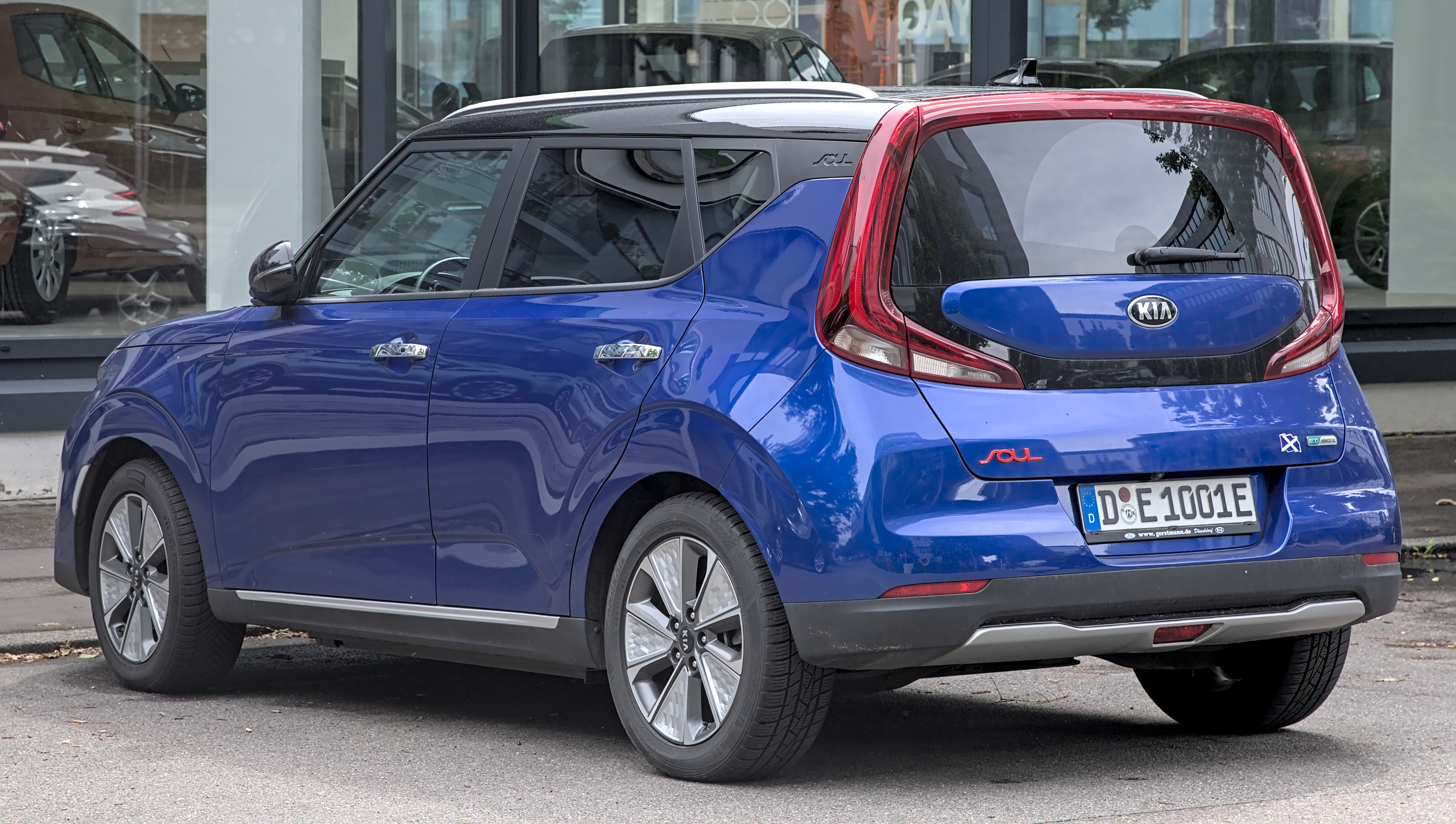
Second generation

== Specifications ==
	MY 2016-2017	MY 2018-2019	MY 2020
Nominal capacity (gross)	30.5 kWh (192 x 42.36 Ah x 3.75 V)	31.8 kWh (200 x 42.36 Ah x 3.75 V)	67.5 kWh
Usable capacity (net)	27 kWh (192 x 37.5 Ah x 3.75 V)	30 kWh (200 x 40 Ah x 3.75 V)	64 kWh
Number of cells	192 (96s2p)	200 (100s2p)	294
Battery weight	277 kg	290 kg	457 kg
Rated voltage	360 V	375 V	356 V
Rapid charging standard	CHAdeMO (up to 100 kW)	CHAdeMO (up to 100 kW)	CCS (up to 100 kW)
Battery cooling	air	air	liquid
Motor power	109 hp (81.4 kW)	109 hp (81.4 kW)	201 hp (204 PS)
Torque	210 lb.-ft. (285 Nm)	210 lb.-ft. (285 Nm)	291 lb.-ft. (395 Nm)
0-60 mph time	9.5 s	9.2 s	7.6 s

=== Range ===
	MY 2016-2017	MY 2018-	MY 2020
EPA range	93 miles (150 km)	111 miles (182 km - 21% increase)	243 miles (390 km)
NEDC range	212 km	250 km – 18% increase	
South Korean cycle	148 km	180 km – 22% increase	
WLTP range			452 km

== Production and sales ==
=== First generation ===
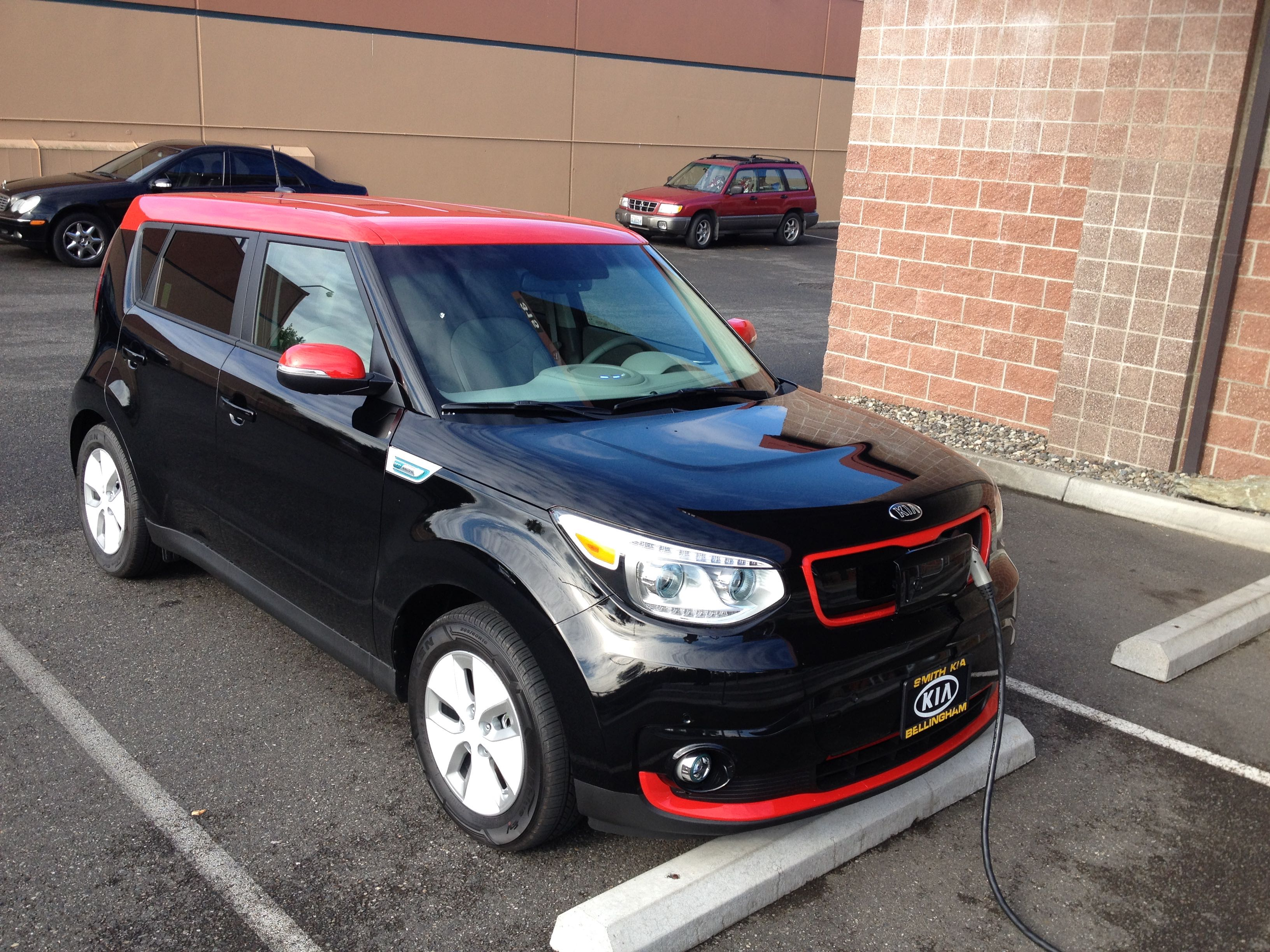
A 2016 Kia Soul EV+ being charged

Production of the Soul EV began in South Korea in April 2014. Pricing in the South Korean market started at 42 million won (~US$39,400), before a 50% government subsidy. Kia set a global sales target of 5,000 units for 2014. Deliveries began in South Korea in May 2014, with 38 units delivered.

On June 12, 2014, Kia began production of the Soul EV for export. The first vehicles off the production line went to select European countries. European retail deliveries began in July 2014.

Sales started in the U.S. in October 2014 as 2015 model year. Initially it was sold only in California, but in March 2015, Kia Motors North America announced the Soul EV would be available in Georgia in the second quarter of 2015, and Washington, Oregon, Hawaii and Texas would receive the EV later in the year. 2016 Kia Soul EVs began sales in Washington state in late July 2015. It was available in two trims, with pricing starting at US$33,700 before any applicable government incentives.

In November 2014, the Kia Soul EV went on sale in the UK for £24,995 after the government's £5,000 Plug-in Car Grant.

Kia announced the 2016 Soul EV would come in three trims: EV-e, EV, and EV+. The EV-e was only available in California. A Sun & Fun package on the EV+ added a sunroof, and lighting for the speakers and interior. Other minor changes and colors were introduced.

Global sales passed the 5,000 unit mark in August 2015, of which 1,177 were sold in South Korea. The 10,000 unit milestone was reached in January 2016, with Europe as the leading market with 6,770 units sold, followed by South Korea with 1,580, and the United States with 1,411. As of December 2015, the leading European markets were Germany with 3,853 units sold, and Norway with 1,637 units.

During 2015, 2,044 Soul EVs were imported to Norway as used cars. The magazine Der Spiegel claimed that Kia registered the cars in Germany and then shipped them to Norway, which does not belong to the European Union. This legal loophole helped the Hyundai-Kia Group lower its average CO_{2} fleet emissions, avoiding a hefty fine.

=== Second generation ===
The 2020 Kia Soul EV costs 319,900 NOK (US$36,600) (Note: As of December 8, 2020) in Norway, less than its internal competitor, the Hyundai Kona Electric and considerably less than the larger Kia Niro EV (another potential competitor, the Chevrolet Bolt, is no longer imported to Europe via official channels).

With demand for EVs reportedly exceeding battery supply, Hyundai-Kia decided to divert batteries to the production of the more expensive Kia Niro (the Niro and the Soul share the same battery), which was the claimed reason for limiting Soul EV production and delaying entry into the US market until 2021.

The Soul EV is the only variant of the Soul sold in Europe. In the first ten months of 2020, European sales totaled 6,768 units.

== Marketing ==
For the 2014 SEMA Show, Kia Motors unveiled a custom Soul EV with a red and white Smitten Ice Cream livery and a refrigerated trailer.

In August 2014, Kia Motors introduced the 2015 Soul EV hamster commercial featuring "Animals" by Maroon 5.

== See also ==
- Kia Ray EV
- Kia Soul
- Electric car use by country
- Government incentives for plug-in electric vehicles
- List of modern production plug-in electric vehicles
- Plug-in electric vehicle
