= DS5 =

DS5, DS-5, or DS 5 may refer to:

Automobiles

- Datsun DS-5, a Japanese 4-door sedan
- DS 5, a French compact station wagon
- DS 5LS, a French-Chinese sedan, separate model from DS 5

Music

- Deepspace5, an American underground hip hop supergroup

== See also ==
- Canon EOS 5DS, a digital SLR camera
