= DS 4S =

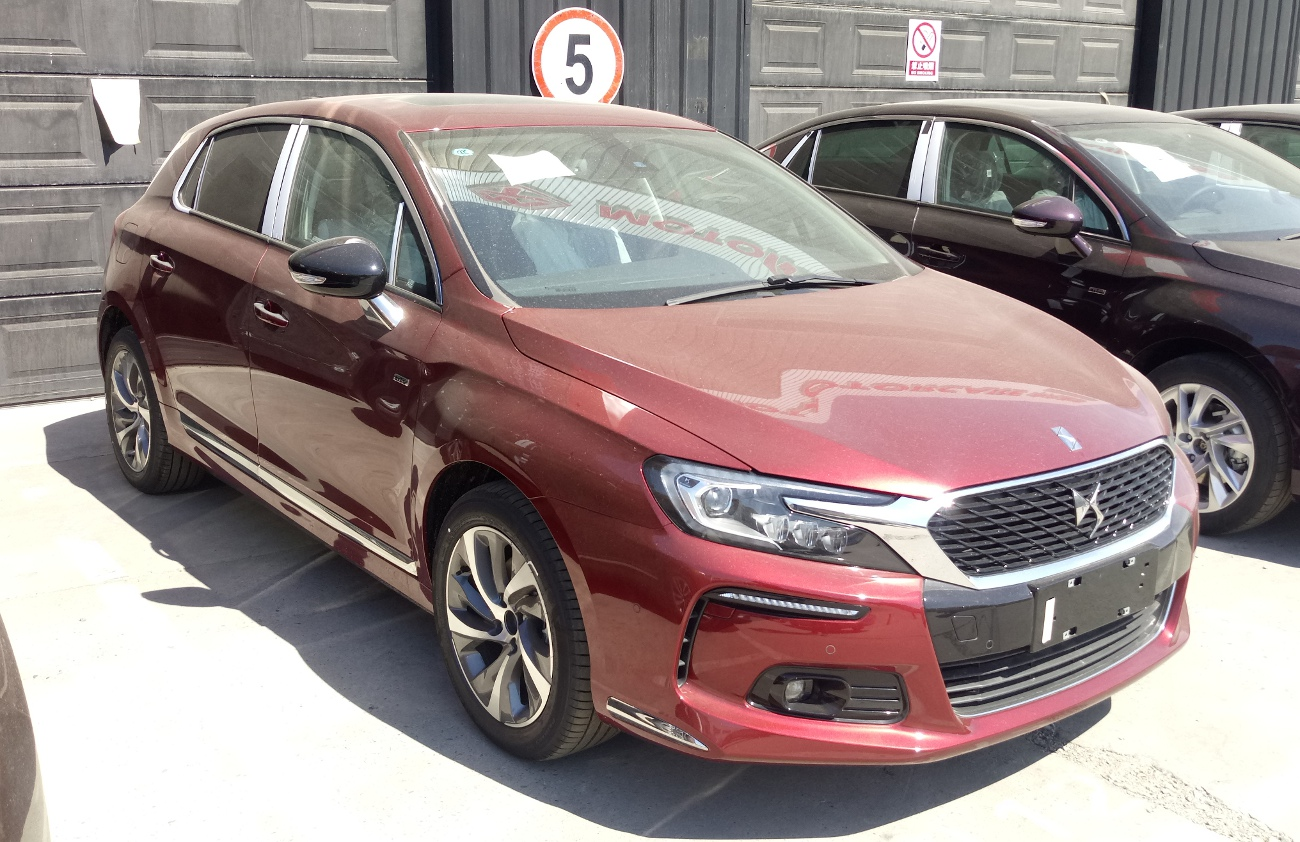

Overview
- Manufacturer: DS Automobiles
- Production: 2015–2019
- Model years: 2016–2019
- Assembly: China: Shenzhen (Changan PSA)

Body and chassis
- Class: Subcompact executive car (C)
- Body style: 5-door hatchback
- Layout: Front-engine, front-wheel-drive layout
- Platform: PSA PF2
- Related: DS 5LS

Powertrain
- Engine: 1.2L turbocharged Inline-three; 1.6L turbocharged Inline-four; 1.8L turbocharged Inline-four
- Transmission: 6-speed automatic

Dimensions
- Wheelbase: 2,715 mm (106.9 in)
- Length: 4,435 mm (174.6 in)
- Width: 1,843 mm (72.6 in)
- Height: 1,510 mm (59.4 in)

Chronology
- Predecessor: DS 4
- Successor: DS 4 II (now DS N°4)

The DS 4S is a subcompact executive car designed and developed by the DS division of the French automaker PSA Peugeot Citroën (later called Groupe PSA). It was unveiled on the 2015 Guangzhou Auto Show.

== Overview ==
The DS 4S was produced and sold only in China and was positioned between the DS4 and the DS5. It was launched on the Chinese car market in April 2016. Its sedan version is the DS 5LS which shares the same platform. The DS 4S also comes with the DS CONNECT technology, which includes navigation, safety and communication functions.

=== Powertrain ===
The DS 4S is equipped with the EAT6 automatic gearbox and is available with three petrol engines including a 1.2-litre turbo engine, a 1.6 litre turbo engine, and a 1.8-litre turbo engine developing maximum power outputs ranging from 136hp to 204hp. The DS 4S also marks the Chinese debut of the PureTech engine, which won the 2015 International Engine of the Year.

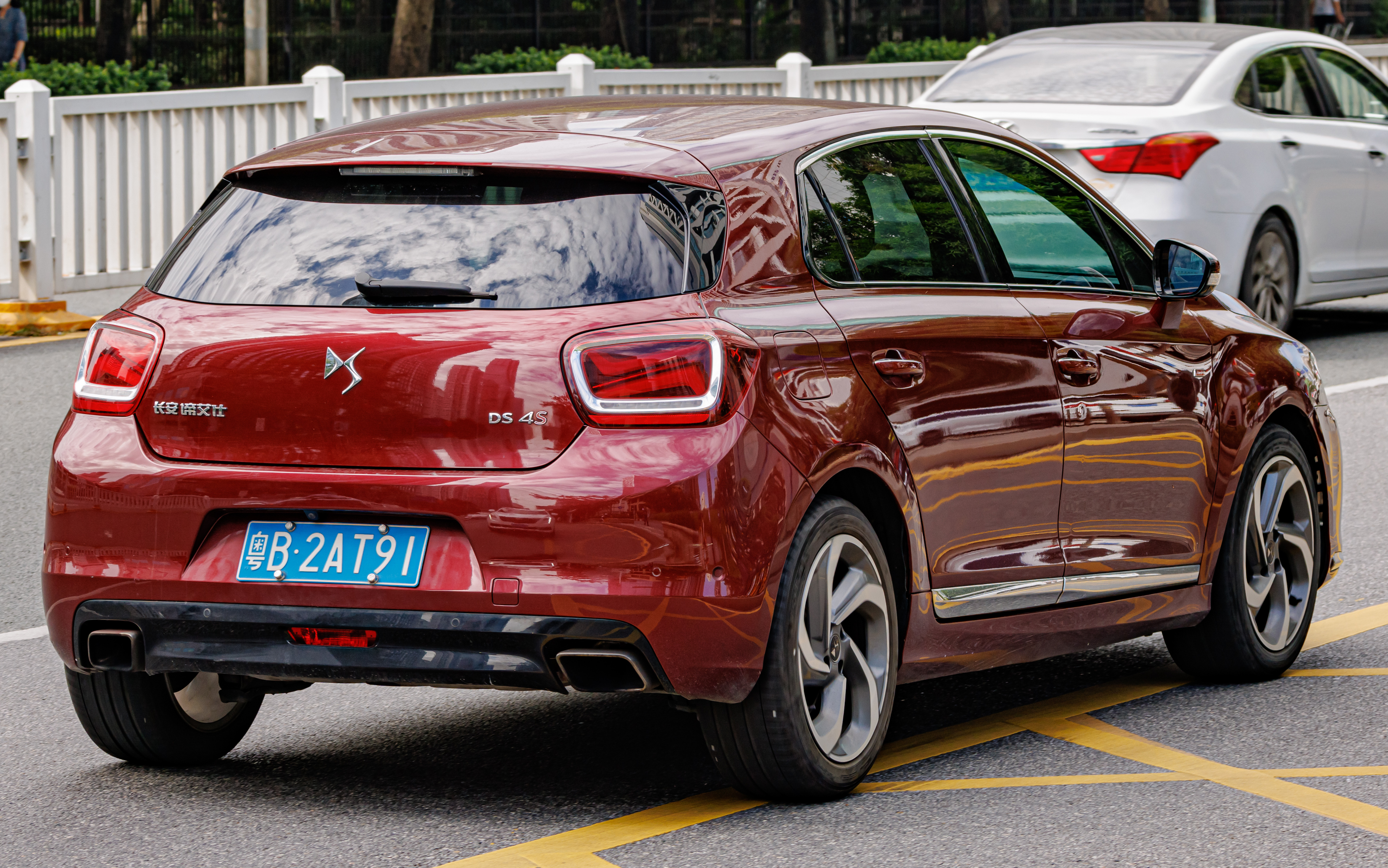
DS 4S rear

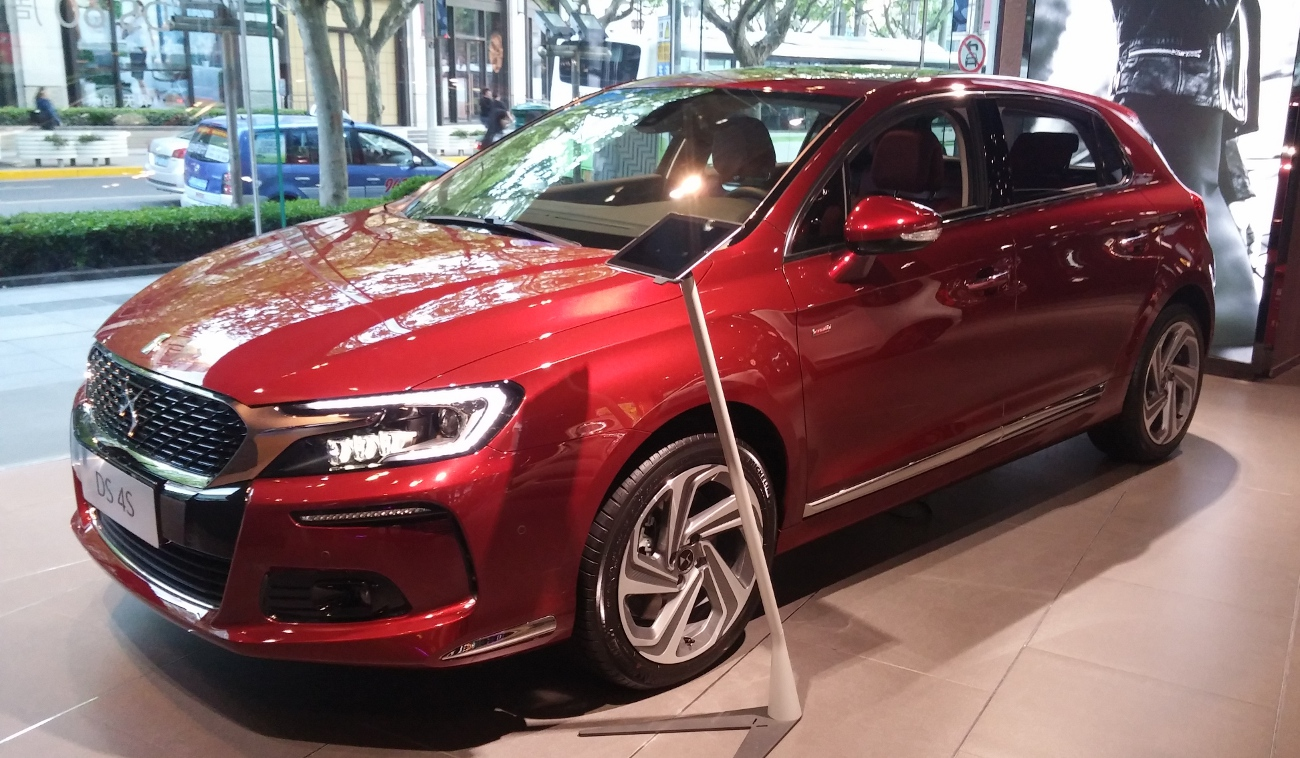
DS 4S in a showroom
