= DS 7 (crossover) =

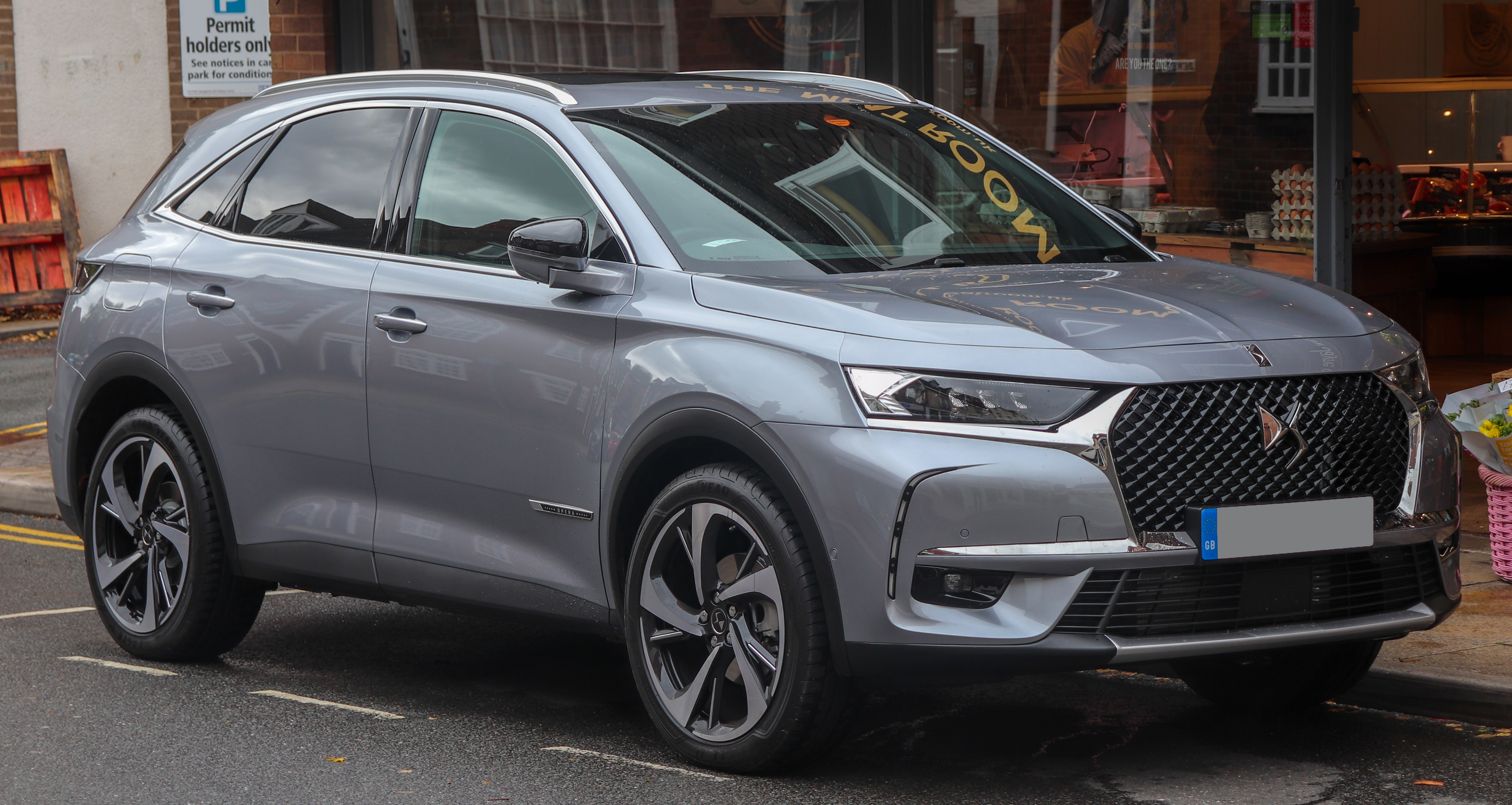

Overview
- Manufacturer: DS Automobiles (Note: PSA Group (2017–2021); Stellantis (2021–present))
- Also called: DS 7 Crossback (China, 2017–2018; global, 2017–2022)
- Production: 2017–2026
- Assembly: France: Mulhouse (Mulhouse Plant); China: Shenzhen (Baoneng, formerly Changan PSA)
- Designer: Ugo Spagnolo

Body and chassis
- Class: Compact luxury crossover SUV
- Body style: 5-door SUV
- Layout: Front-engine, front-wheel-drive or all-wheel-drive
- Platform: PSA EMP2 platform
- Related: Citroën C5 Aircross; Peugeot 3008 II; Peugeot 5008 II; Opel Grandland

Powertrain
- Engine: Petrol: 1.2 L PSA EB2DTS Turbo I3; 1.6 L PSA EP6FDT Turbo I4; Diesel: 1.5 L PSA DV5 BlueHDi I4; 2.0 L PSA DW10 BlueHDi I4; Hybrid: 1.6 L PSA EP6FDT PHEV I4 (HYBRID 225 e-EAT8); 1.6 L PSA EP6CDTX PHEV I4 (HYBRID4 300 e-EAT8)
- Electric motor: 80 kW (109 PS; 107 hp) Front Synchronous Electric Motor (DS 7 E-Tense); 82 kW (111 PS; 110 hp) Rear Synchronous Electric Motor; 2x Total 162 kW (220 PS; 217 hp) Synchronous Electric Motor (DS 7 Crossback E-Tense 4x4; 2017–2022 / DS 7 E-Tense 4x4 2022–present)
- Power output: List: 95.6 kW (130 PS; 128 hp) (1.2 Puretech EB2DTS); 95.6 kW (130 PS; 128 hp) (1.5 BlueHDi); 165 kW (224 PS; 221 hp) (E-TENSE 225); 221 kW (300 PS; 296 hp) (E-TENSE 4×4 300); 272 kW (370 PS; 365 hp) (E-TENSE 4×4 360)
- Transmission: 6-speed manual 8-speed Aisin AWF8F35 automatic
- Hybrid drivetrain: PHEV (Crossback E-Tense 4x4)

Dimensions
- Wheelbase: 2,730 mm (107.5 in)
- Length: 4,590 mm (180.7 in)
- Width: 1,895 mm (74.6 in)
- Height: 1,635 mm (64.4 in)
- Curb weight: 1,493–1,900 kg (3,290–4,190 lb)

Chronology
- Successor: DS No. 7

The DS 7 is a compact luxury crossover SUV from the French automaker DS Automobiles. Presented for the first time on 28 February 2017, the vehicle's public premiere was at the 87th Geneva Motor Show in March 2017 and was known as the DS 7 Crossback globally prior to 2023 and briefly in China.

The DS7, like the Citroën C5 Aircross, is based on the EMP2 platform of Groupe PSA. Though not the first SUV for and from the brand (see DS 6), it is the first SUV for Europe.

== Overview ==
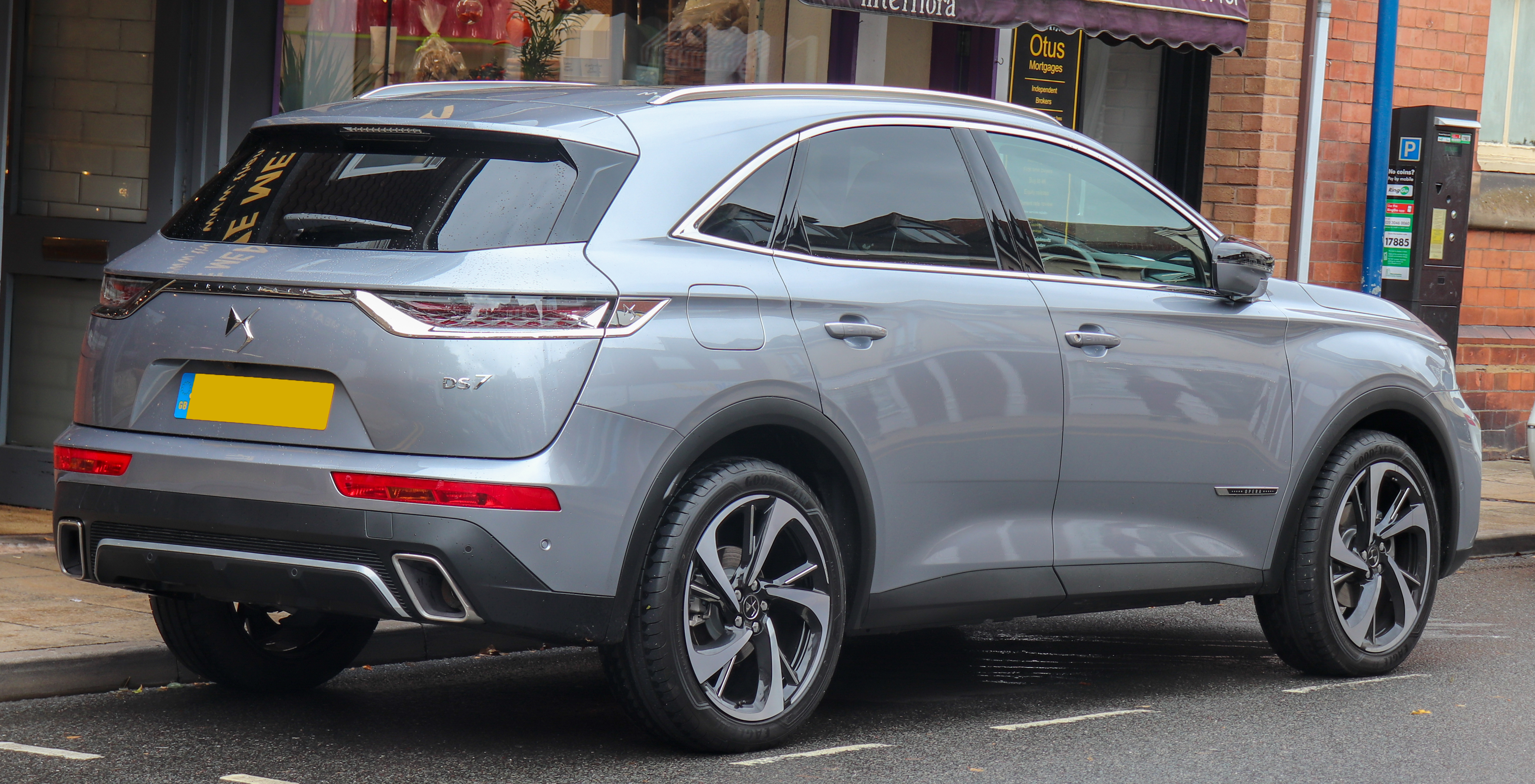
DS7 Crossback Ultra Prestige PTC (UK)

The DS7 was revealed to the press on 28 February 2017, before being shown to the public at the 2017 Geneva Motor Show and marketed in January 2018 for diesel versions.

=== Positioning ===
With the DS 5 in 2011 being the last new model launched by DS Automobiles in Europe, its overall sales have been affected, falling in recent years.

As well as improving sales, the DS 7 Crossback was more comfortable, with build quality and technologies (driving aids, semi-autonomous driving) also improved.

=== DS7 Crossback Presidential ===
On his inauguration on 14 May 2017, the elected president Emmanuel Macron chose the DS 7 Crossback as his presidential car. This was the first time a president used an SUV model as part of an inauguration ceremony. It was only used once for this occasion and was later exhibited in the showroom DS World Paris.

This specific version (lent seven months before the model is sold in France, scheduled for January 2018) is in an ink blue color and has a custom-made, uncovered roof. French flags and logos "RF" (for "République Française" (or "[the] French Republic" in French)) appear in various places, the interiors a black leather, and a "lacquer canvas" (a fabric coated with lacquer) has been specially made by the Maury workshop.

On the occasion of the European Heritage Days on 16 and 17 September 2017, the DS 7 Crossback Présidentiel was exhibited in the courtyard of the Palais de l'Elysée.

=== Esprit de Voyage ===
Introduced in March 2023, the "Esprit de Voyage" special edition, French for "spirit of travel", is the flagship trim level for the DS 4 and DS 7 and features new materials and color combinations inspired by the fashion industry.

== Gallery ==
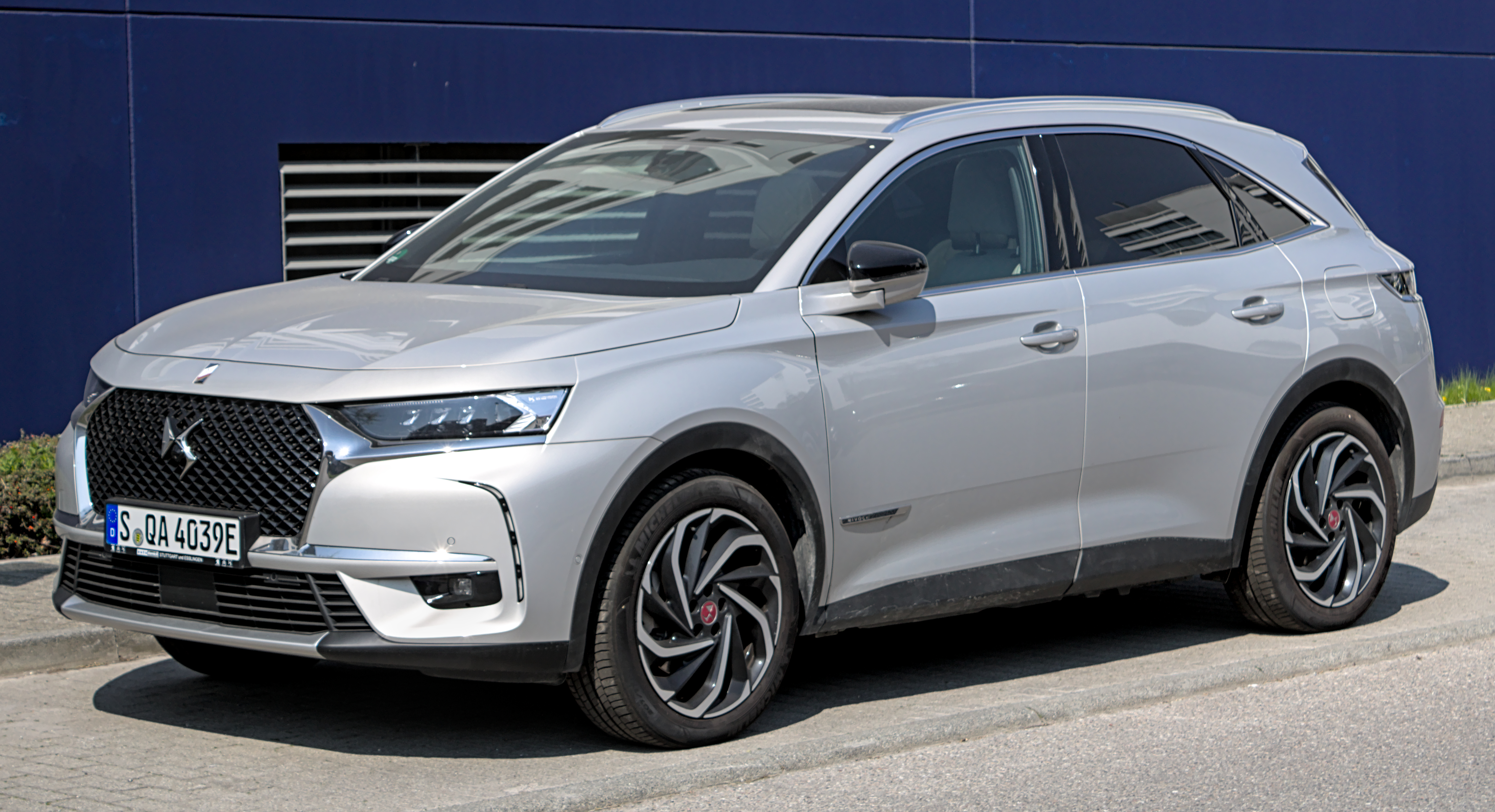
DS 7 Crossback E-Tense

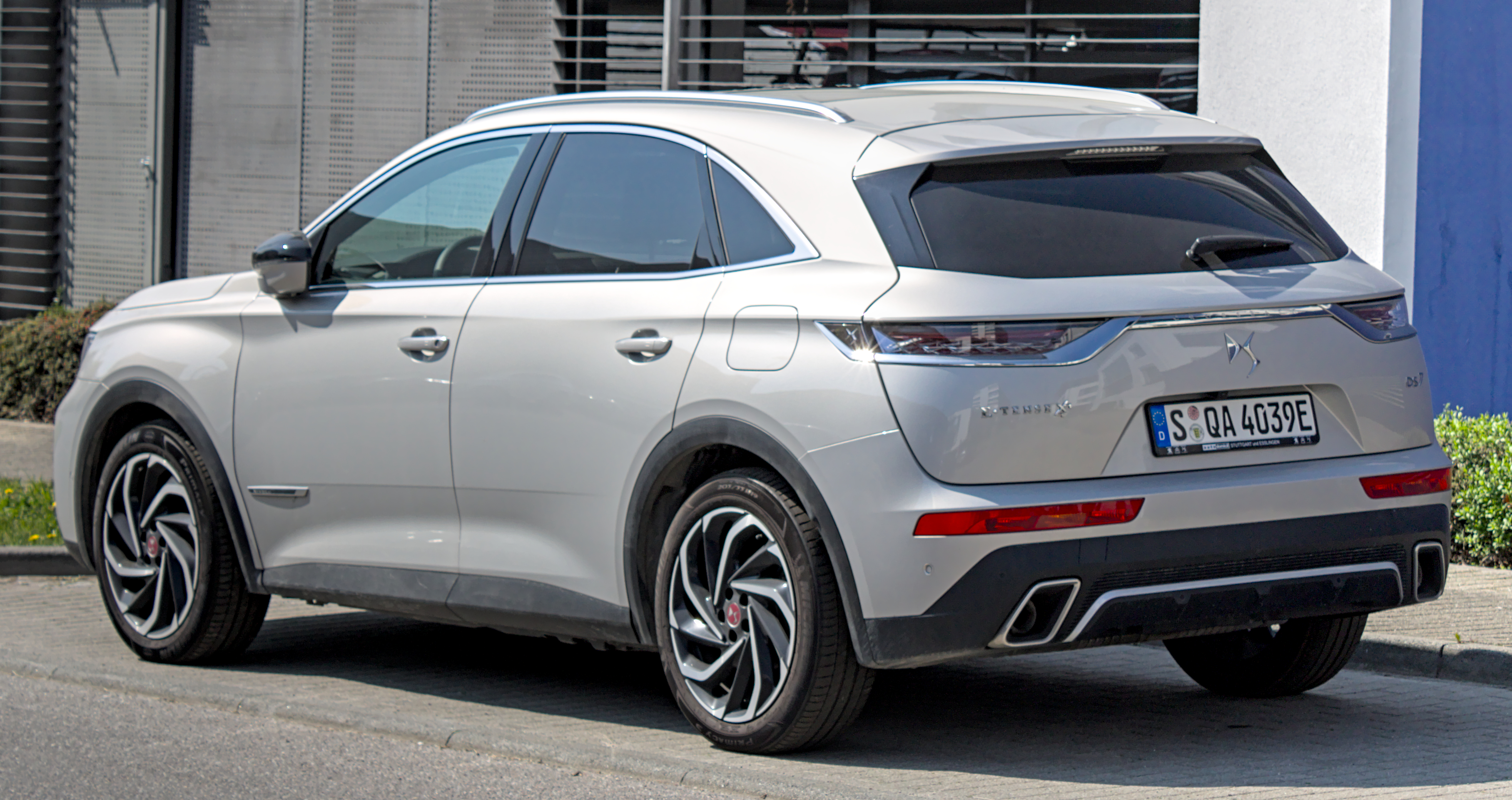
E-Tense Rear view

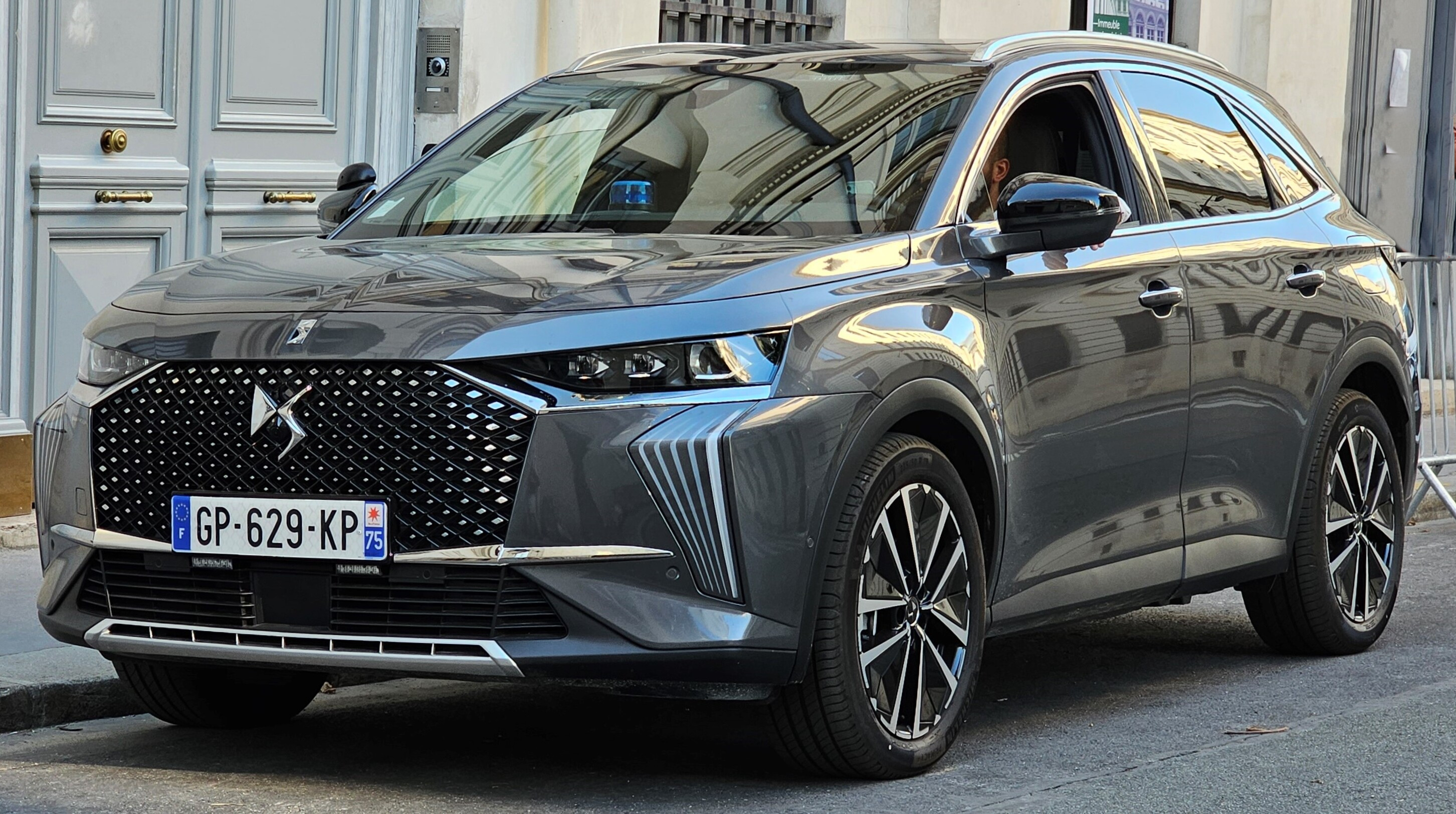
DS 7 E-Tense

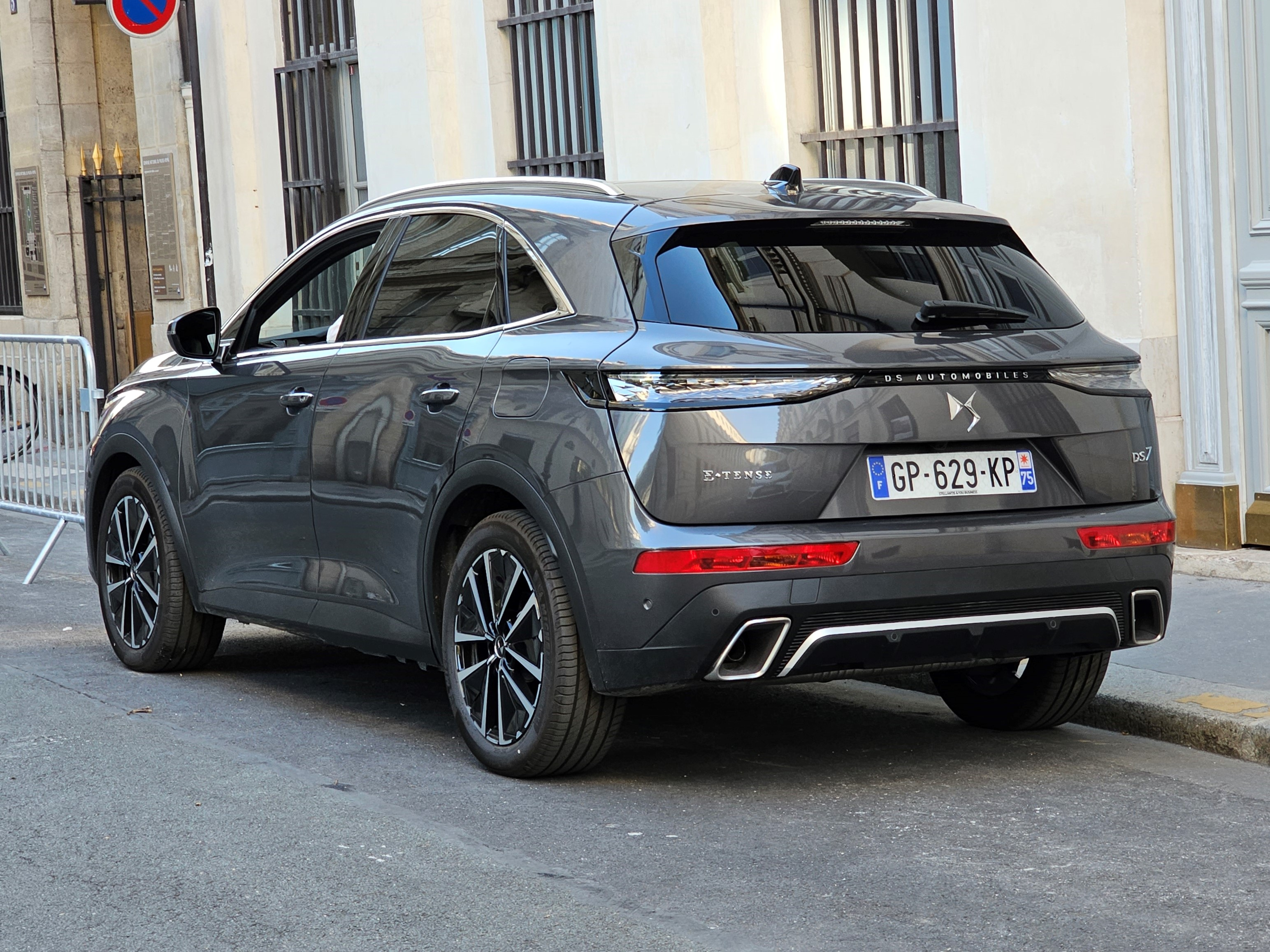
DS 7 E-Tense Rear View

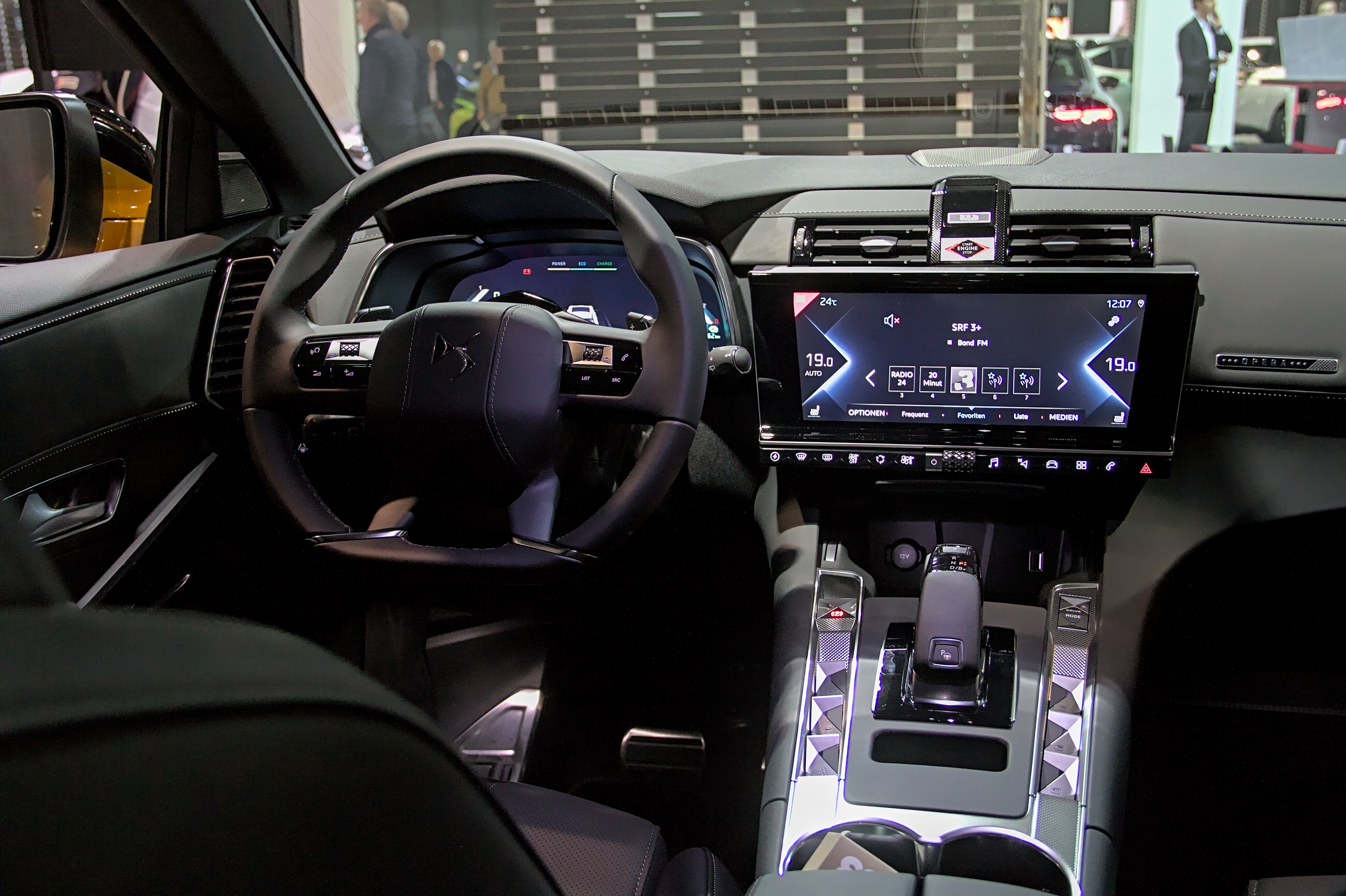
Interior

== Sales ==
Year	China
2023	271
2024	89
