= DS6 =

DS6, DS-6, or DS 6 may refer to:

- DS 6, a French subcompact SUV
- Nerf Elite ShellStrike DS-6, a Nerf Blaster
- DeepStar Six, 1989 American science fiction horror film
