= DS No. 4 =

DS N°4
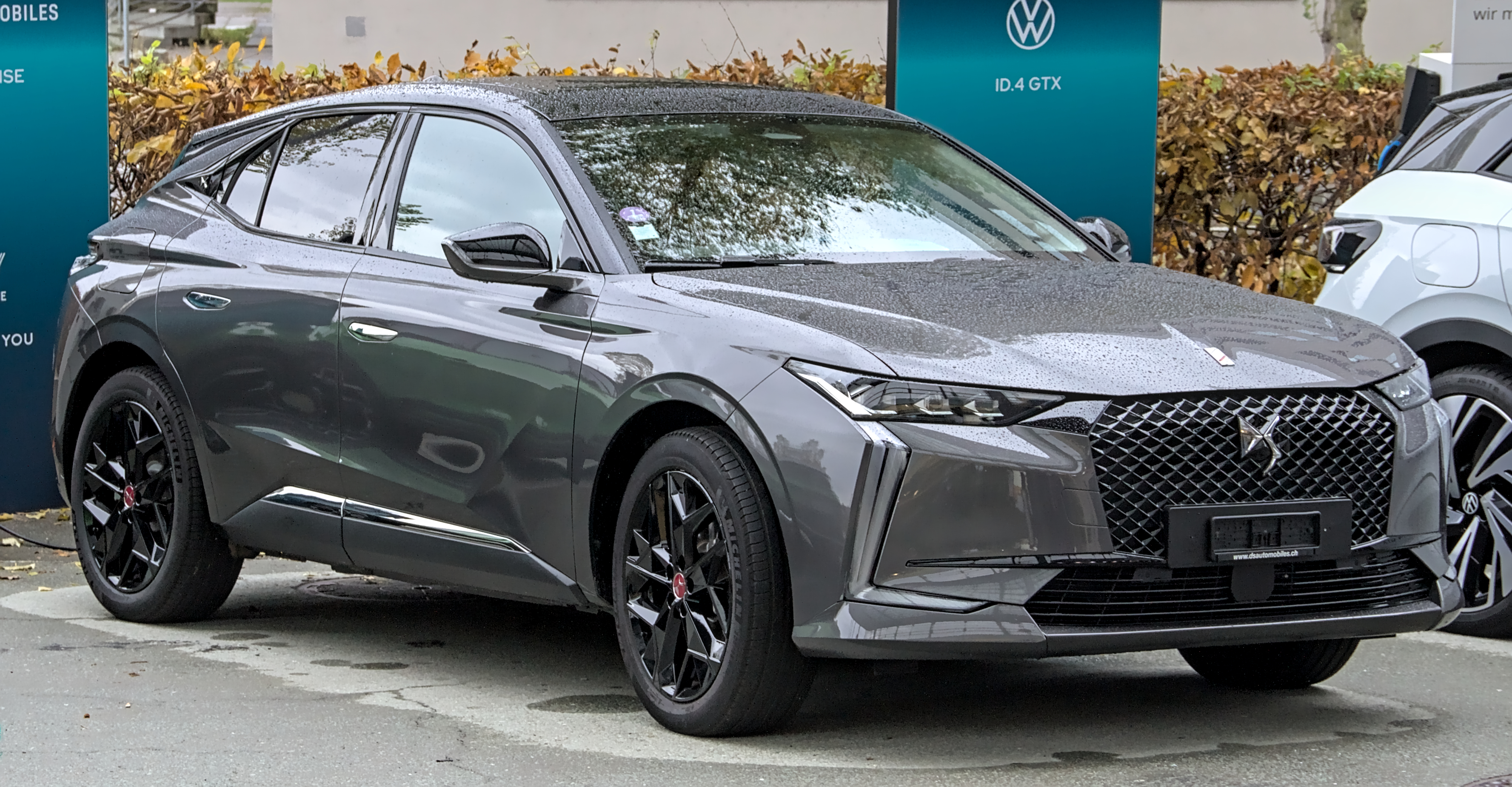

Overview
- Manufacturer: DS Automobiles
- Model code: D41; D44
- Also called: DS 4 (2021–2025)
- Production: 2021–present
- Assembly: Germany: Rüsselsheim (Opel)
- Designer: Thomas Duhamel

Body and chassis
- Class: Subcompact executive/small family car (C)
- Body style: 5-door hatchback
- Platform: PSA EMP2 platform
- Related: Peugeot 308 III; Opel Astra L; Peugeot 408 (P54)

Powertrain
- Engine: Petrol: 1.2 L PSA EB2DTS turbo I3; 1.6 L PSA EP6FDT turbo I4; Petrol PHEV: 1.6 L PSA EP6FDT I4; Diesel: 1.5 L PSA DV5 BlueHDi I4
- Electric motor: Permanent magnet synchronous (E-Tense)
- Transmission: 6-speed dual-clutch (MHEV); 7-speed dual-clutch (PHEV); 8-speed automatic

Dimensions
- Wheelbase: 2,680 mm (105.5 in)
- Length: 4,415 mm (173.8 in)
- Width: 1,830 mm (72.0 in)
- Height: 1,495 mm (58.9 in)
- Kerb weight: 1,360–1,496 kg (2,998–3,298 lb)

Chronology
- Predecessor: DS 4 (2015); DS 5; DS 4S (China)

The DS No. 4 (stylized as DS N°4, pronounced as "number 4" and previously known as the DS 4) is a subcompact executive/small family car (C-segment) unveiled on 3 February 2021 by DS Automobiles. It is intended to replace the DS 4 which was discontinued in 2018. It is based on the PSA EMP2 platform of the PSA Group. The car is available in three versions: N°4 E-TENSE (100% electric), N°4 HYBRID, N°4 PLUG-IN-HYBRID.

Following the 2025 facelift it was renamed to the DS N°4.

== Overview ==
It was designed in Paris, but is produced at Opel's plant in Rüsselsheim.

In terms of powertrains, a E-TENSE hybrid version will be available, and in terms of petrol engines, it is equipped with the PureTech range with powers outputs of 130 hp (97 kW; 132 PS), 180 hp (134 kW; 182 PS), or 220 hp (164 kW; 223 PS). It is available for sale from the fourth quarter of 2021.

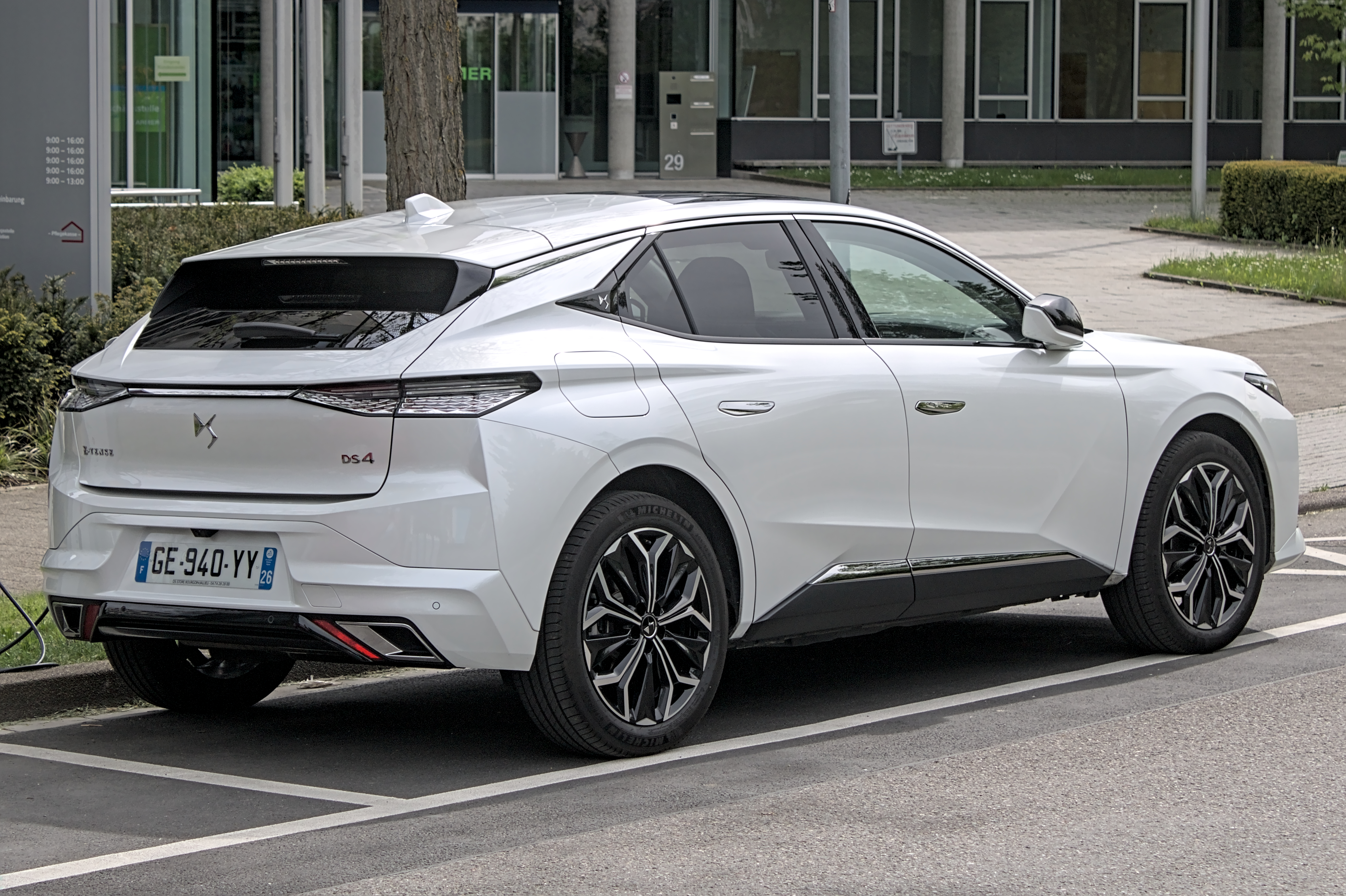
Rear view

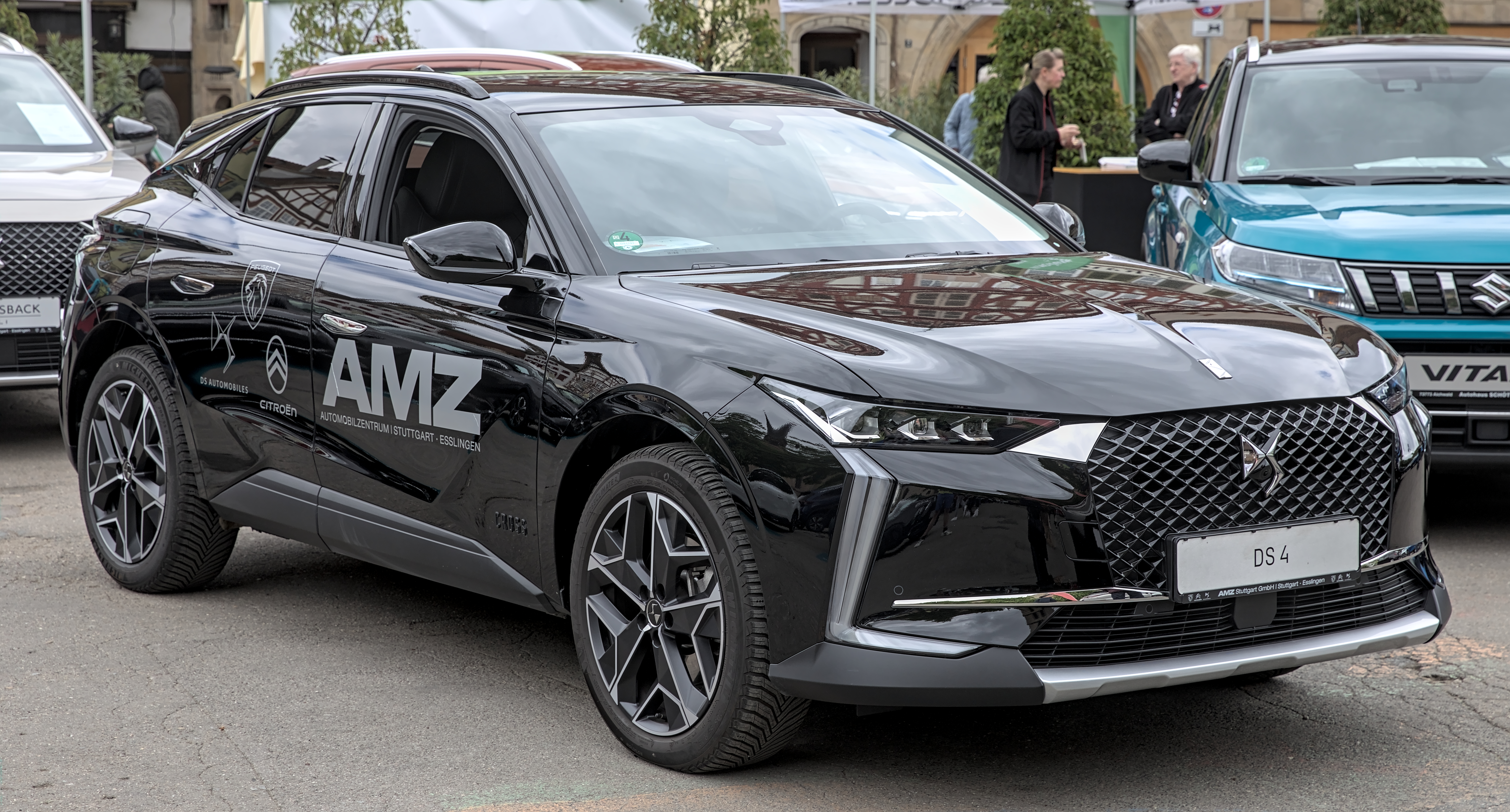
DS 4 Cross

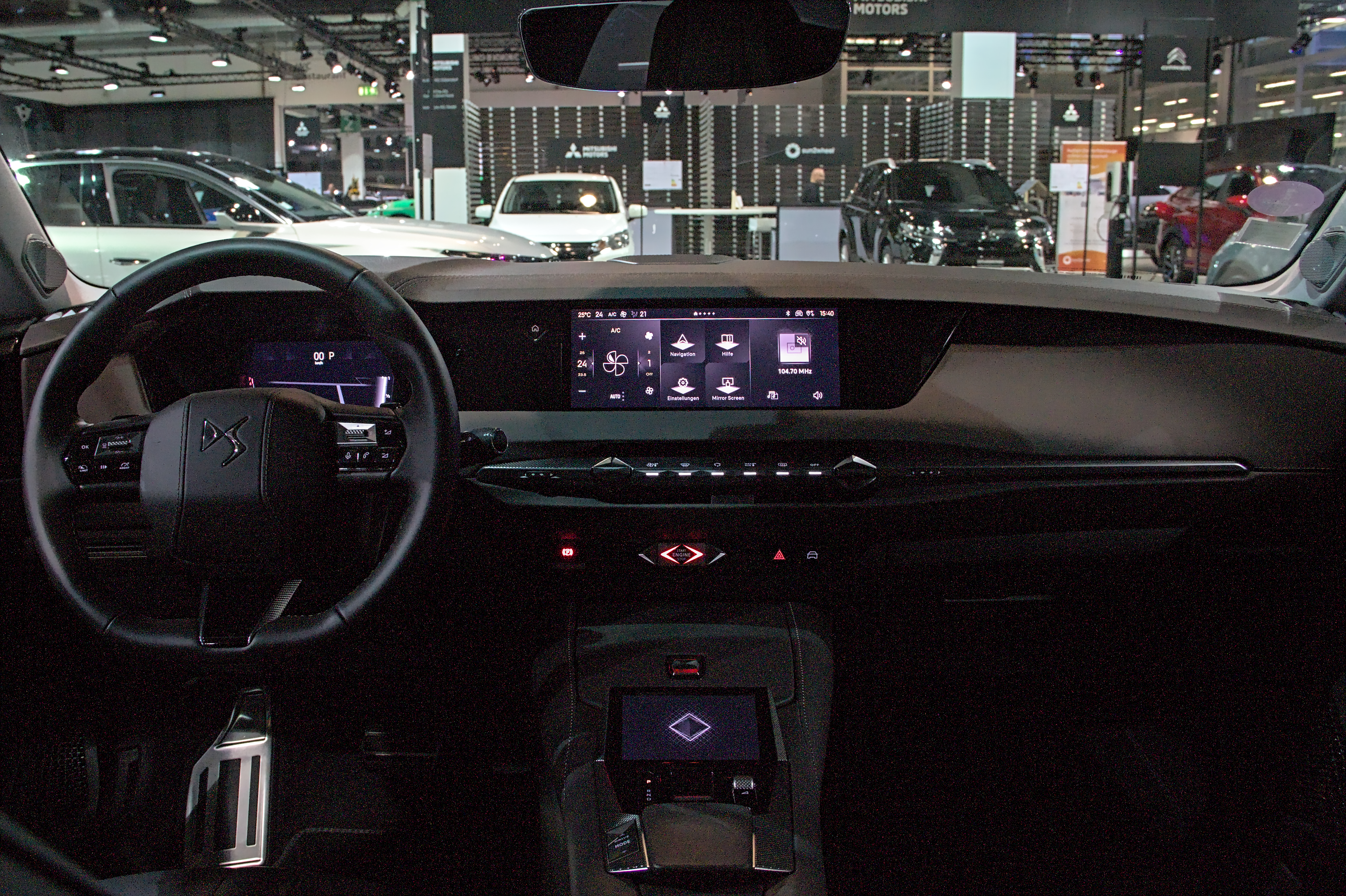
Interior

=== 2022 refresh ===
In October 2022, the trim structure was revised, which now includes a new Opera flagship and increased EV range for the E-Tense PHEV version.

==== Esprit de Voyage ====
Introduced in March 2023, the "Esprit de Voyage" special edition, French for "spirit of travel", is the flagship trim level for the DS 4 and DS 7 and features new materials and colour combinations inspired by the fashion industry.

=== 2025 refresh ===
The 2025 refresh for the DS 4 was announced on May 14, 2025. It features new body styling as well as a new front end inspired by the DS N°8. The model was also renamed to the DS N°4. Some changes were also made to the interior.

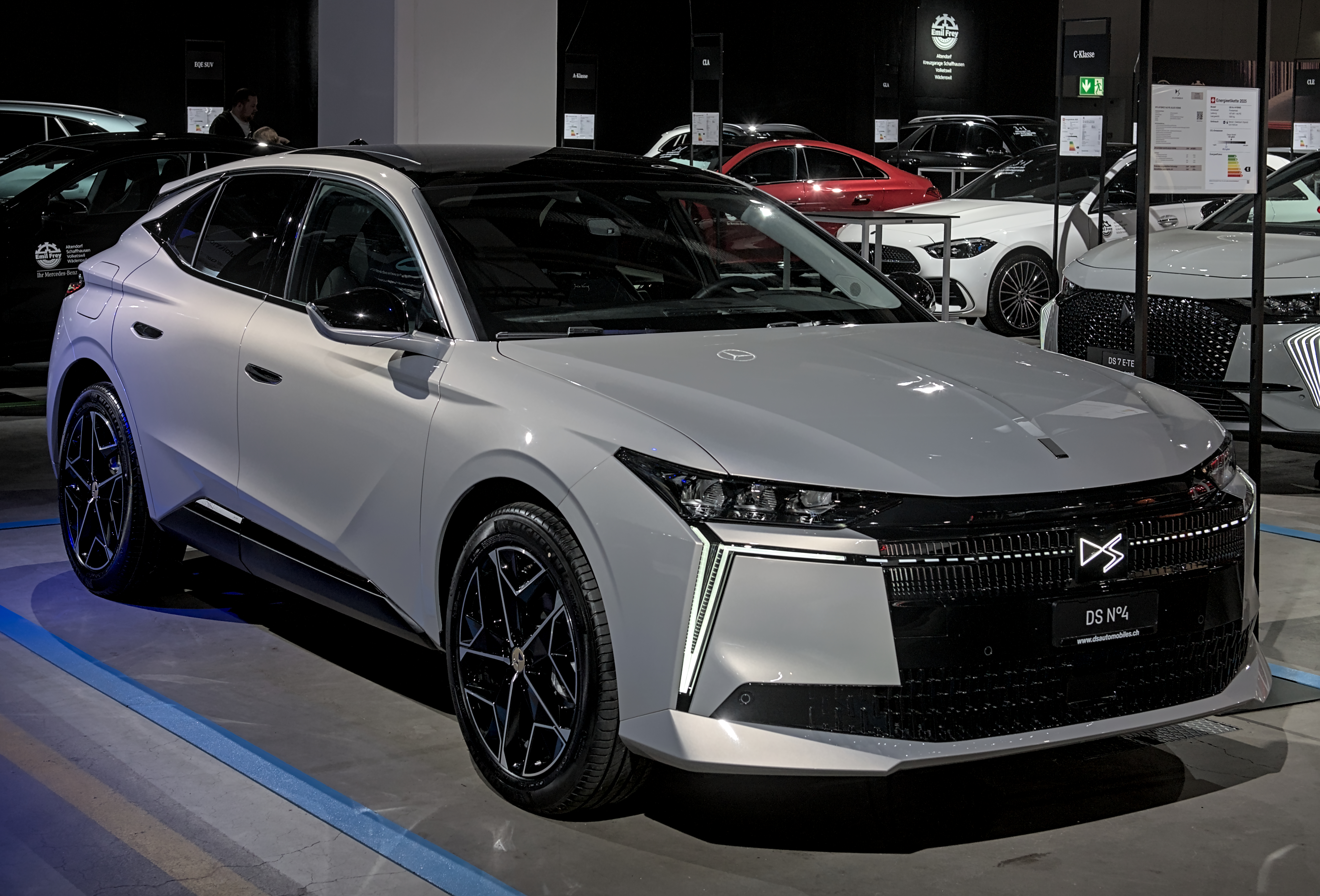
DS N°4

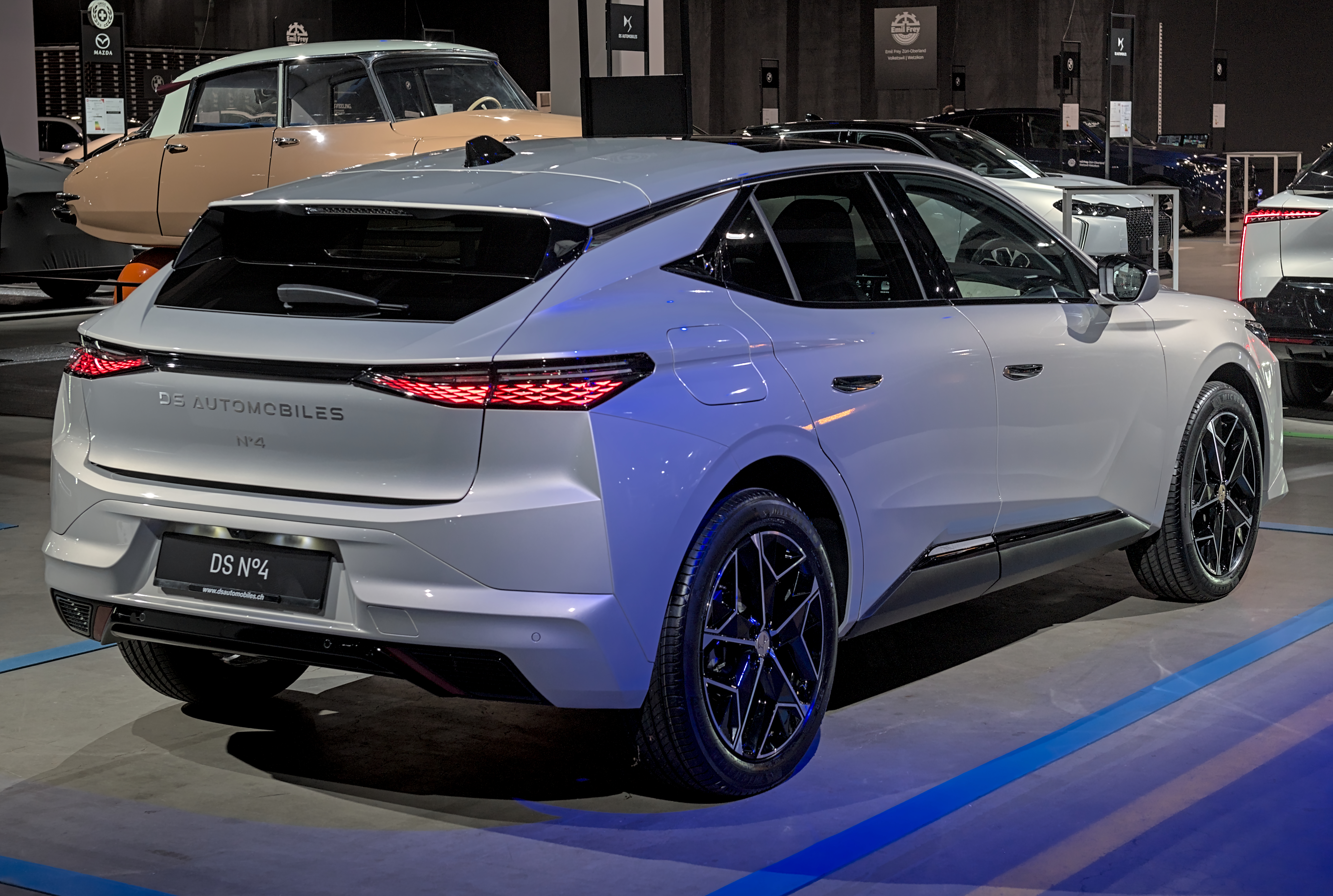
Rear view

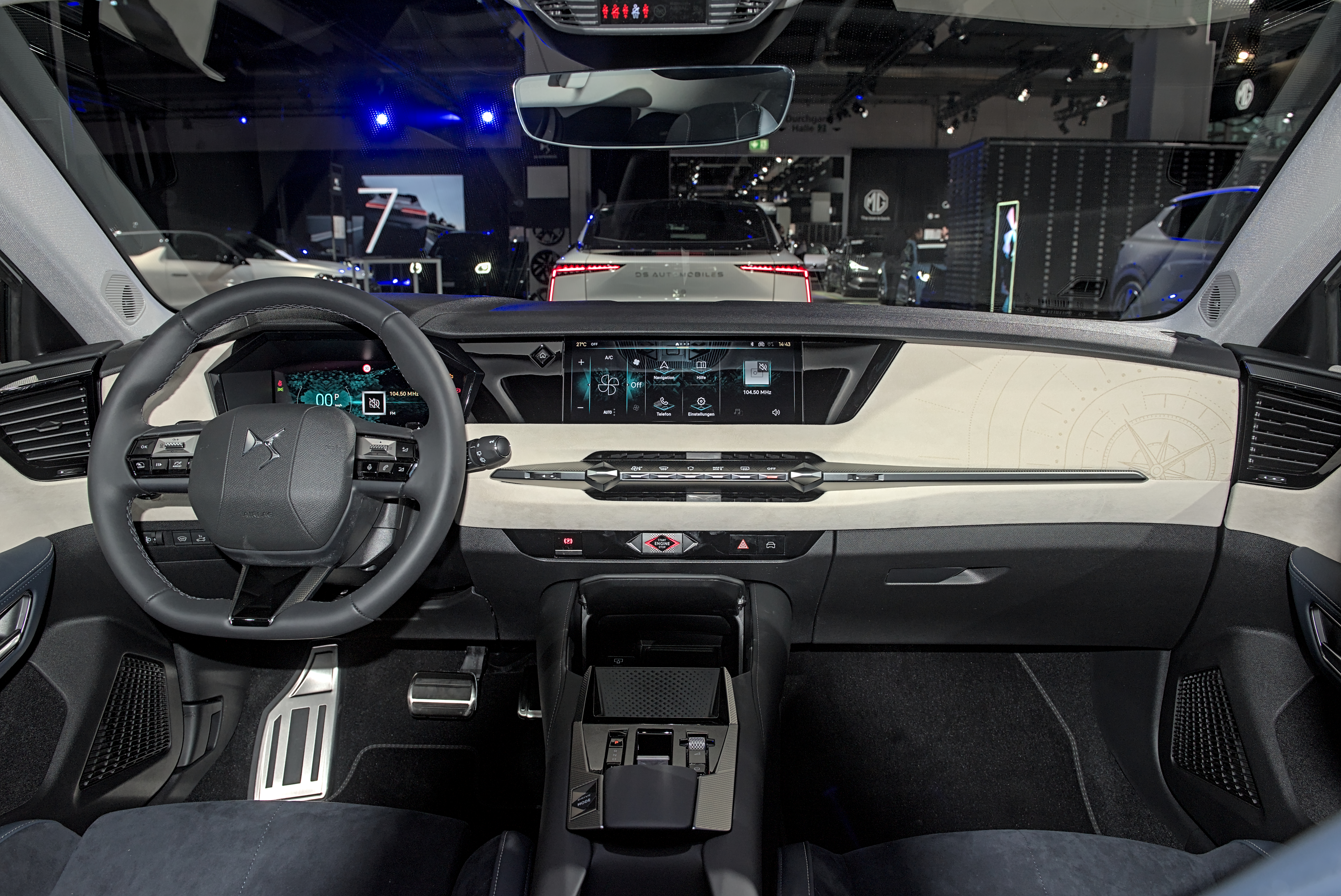
Interior

=== Safety ===
Euro NCAP test results DS 4 1.6 Hybrid (LHD) (2022)
Test	Points	%
Overall:	4 /5 stars	
Adult occupant:	32.6	85%
Child occupant:	42.4	86%
Pedestrian:	40.5	74%
Safety assist:	10.4	65%

== Production and sales ==
Year	Worldwide Production	Worldwide sales	China
2010	300	200	
2011	34,593	29,477	
2012	30,700	33,157	
2013		29,802	
2014		21,643	
2015		18,825	
2016		19,938	
2017		12,257	
2018		5,381	
2019			
2020			
2021			
2022			
2023			15
2024			69
2025			1
