= DS 6 =

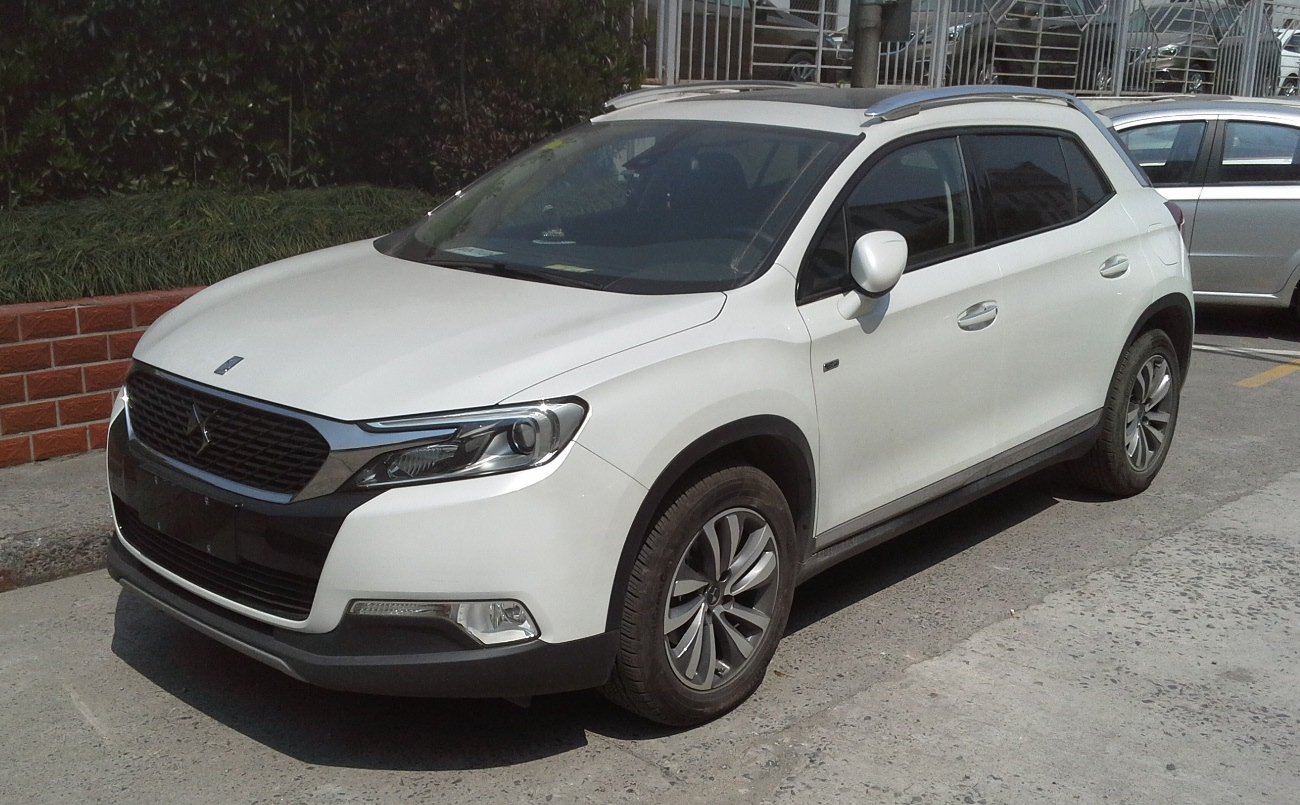

Overview
- Manufacturer: DS Automobiles (Citroën)
- Also called: DS 6WR
- Production: 2014–2020
- Assembly: Shenzhen, China (Changan PSA)

Body and chassis
- Class: Subcompact luxury crossover SUV
- Body style: 5-door SUV
- Platform: PSA PF2
- Related: Citroën DS5

Powertrain
- Engine: 1.6 litre Prince THP200 Turbo (petrol)
- Transmission: 6-speed Aisin EAT6 automatic

Dimensions
- Wheelbase: 2,732 mm (107.6 in)
- Length: 4,553 mm (179.3 in)
- Width: 1,858 mm (73.1 in)
- Height: 1,588 mm (62.5 in)
- Kerb weight: 1,550 kg (3,417 lb)

Chronology
- Successor: DS 3 Crossback; DS 7 Crossback

The DS 6 is a subcompact luxury crossover SUV designed by the French automaker DS Automobiles specifically for the market in Asia. It was the second model of DS, then a sub brand, to not feature the Citroën logo, following the launch of the DS 5LS earlier in 2014. First announced to the public in April 2014 as the DS 6WR, it was released for sale in the autumn of 2014.

It is powered by a four-cylinder 1.6 litre (1598 cc) petrol engine, producing 200 PS (147 kW; 197 bhp) at 5800 rpm and 275 N⋅m (203 lb⋅ft) torque at 1700 to 4500 rpm. It is claimed to accelerate from 0–100 km in 8.4 seconds.

The DS 6 was exported to Iran and Angola.

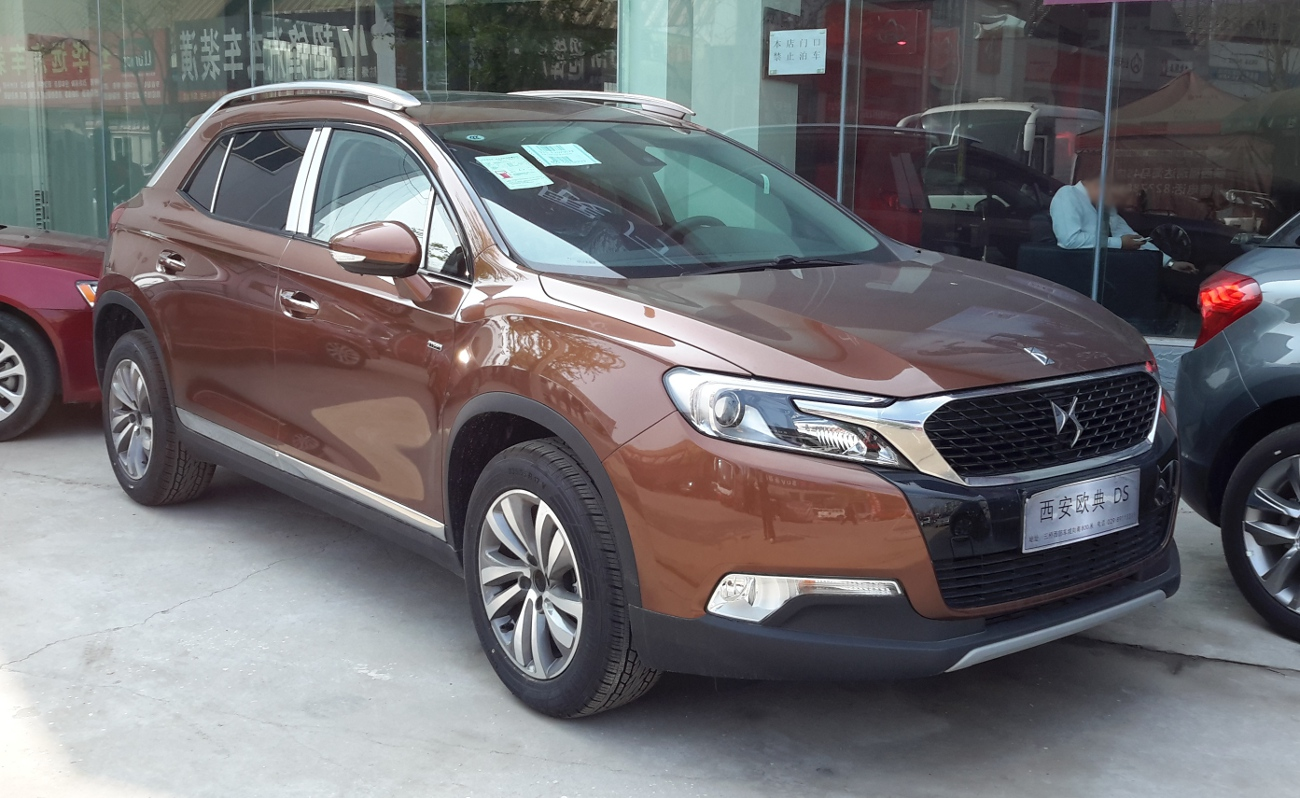
DS 6 (front)

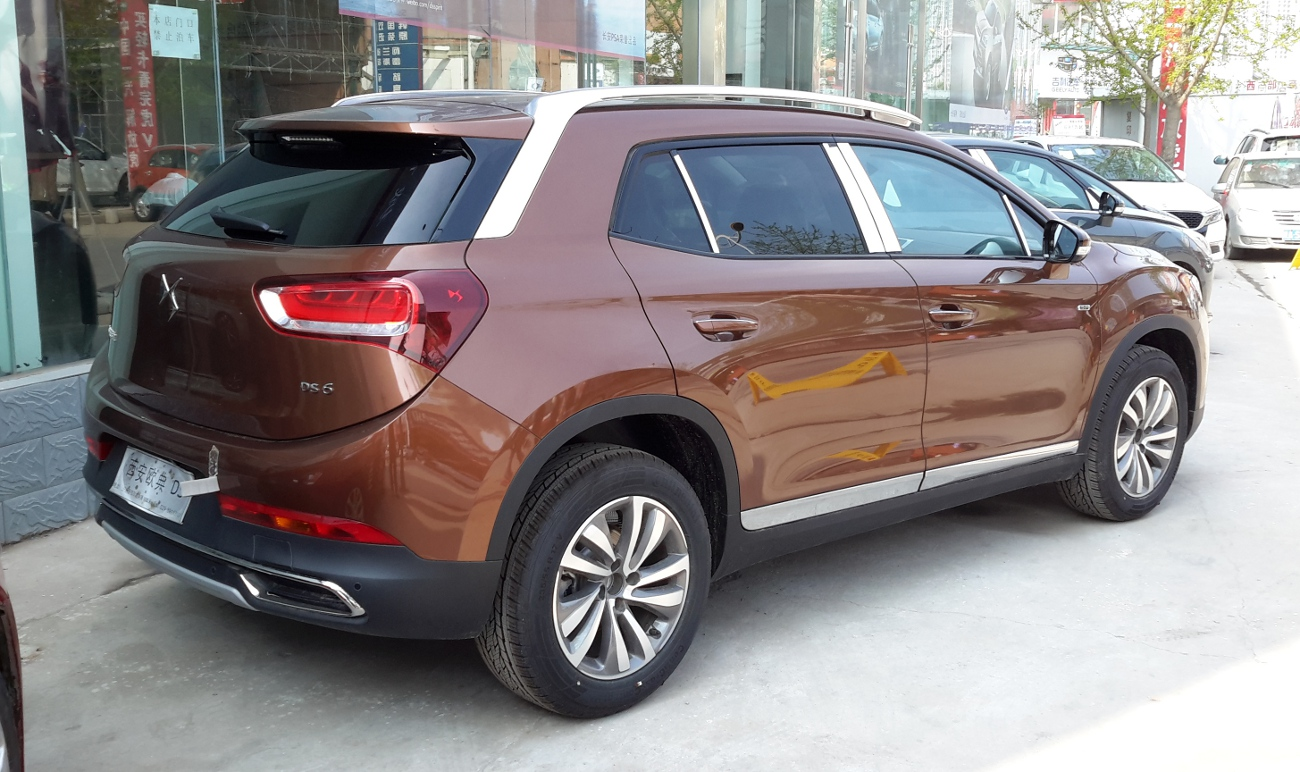
DS 6 (rear)

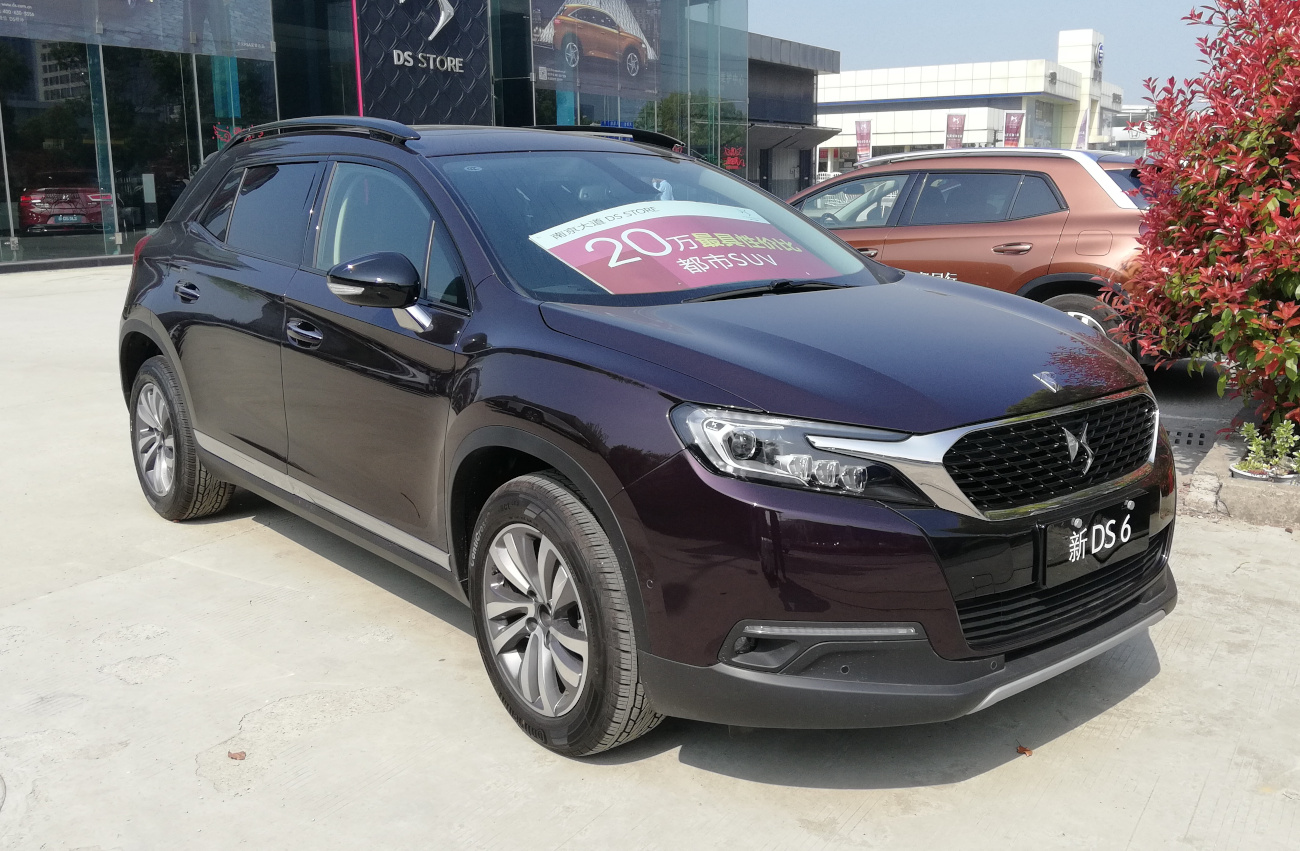
DS 6 facelift (front)

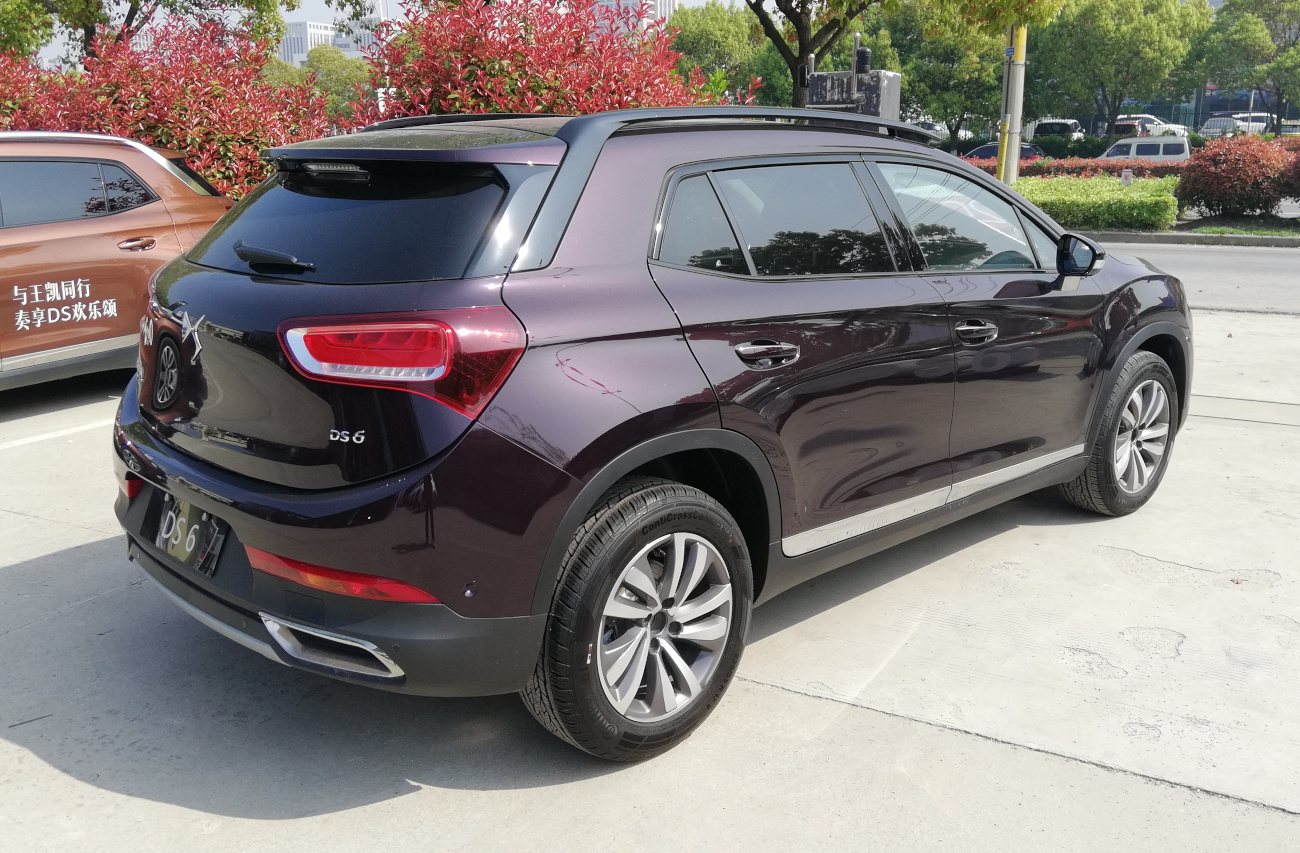
DS 6 facelift (rear)

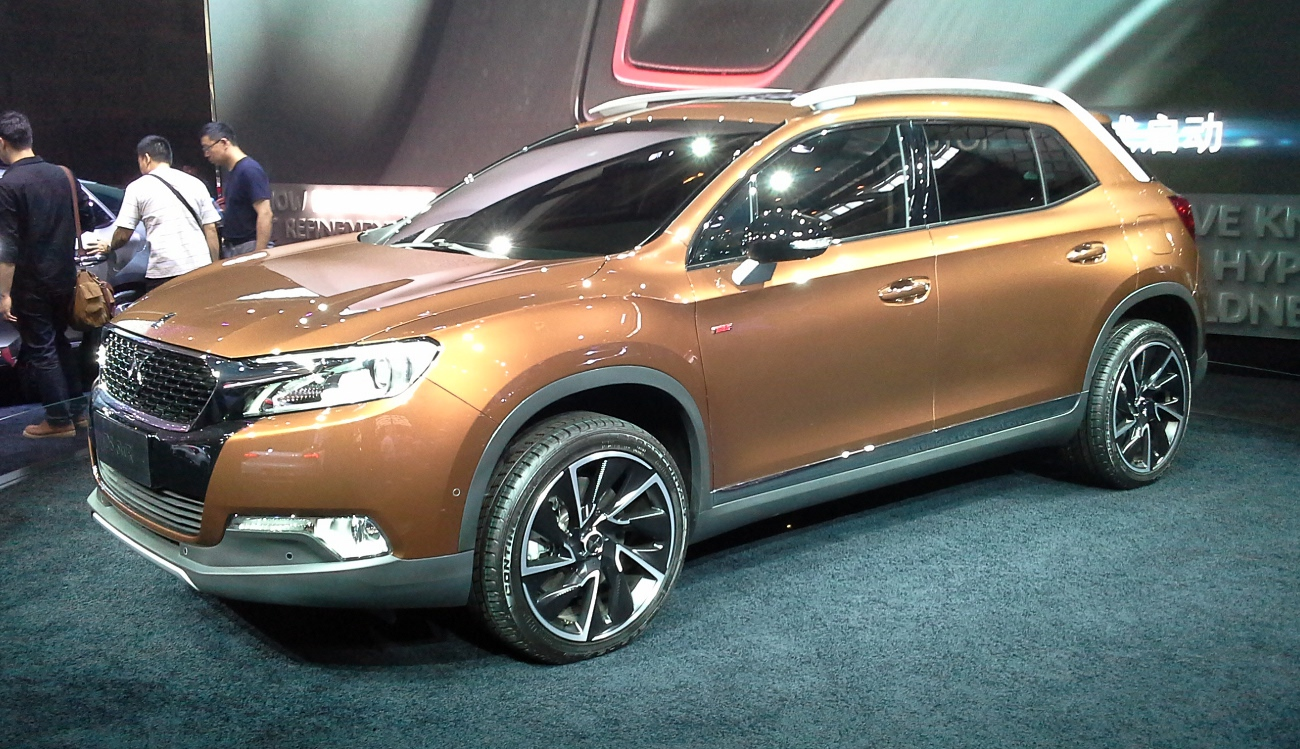
DS 6WR (front)

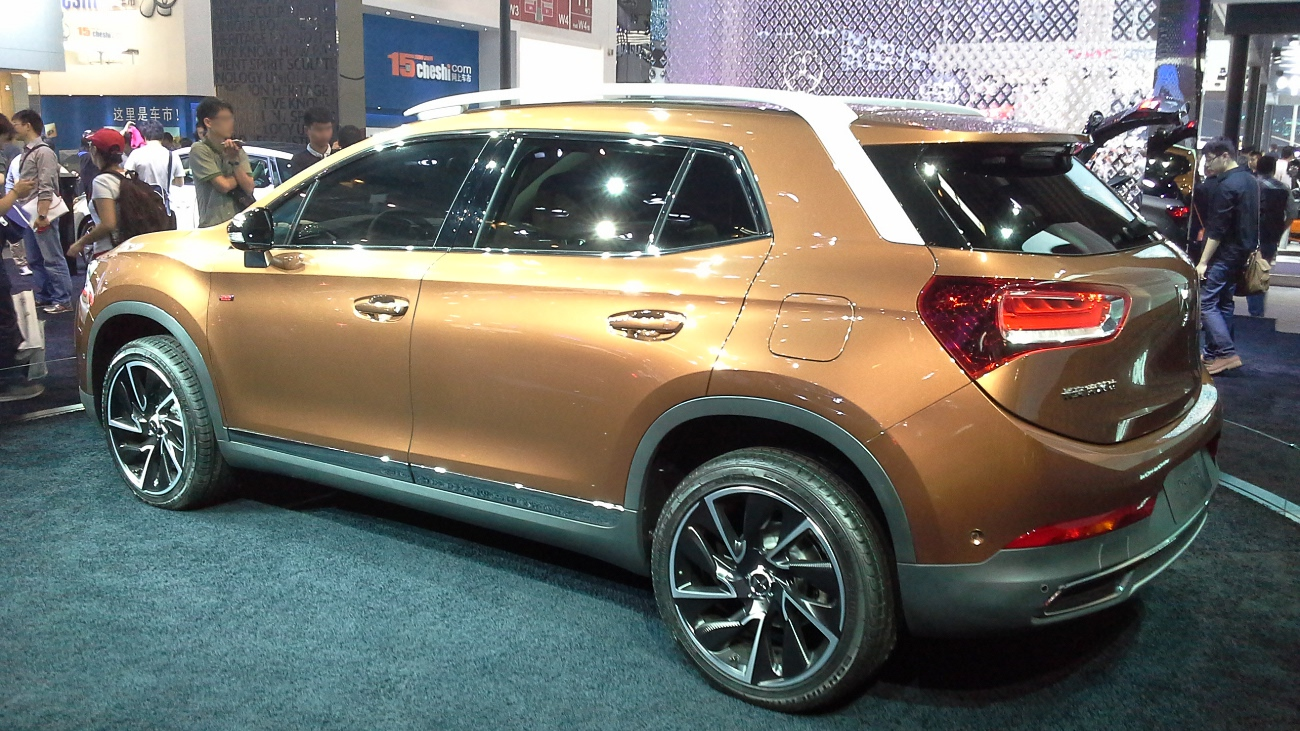
DS 6WR (rear)
