= DS 5LS =

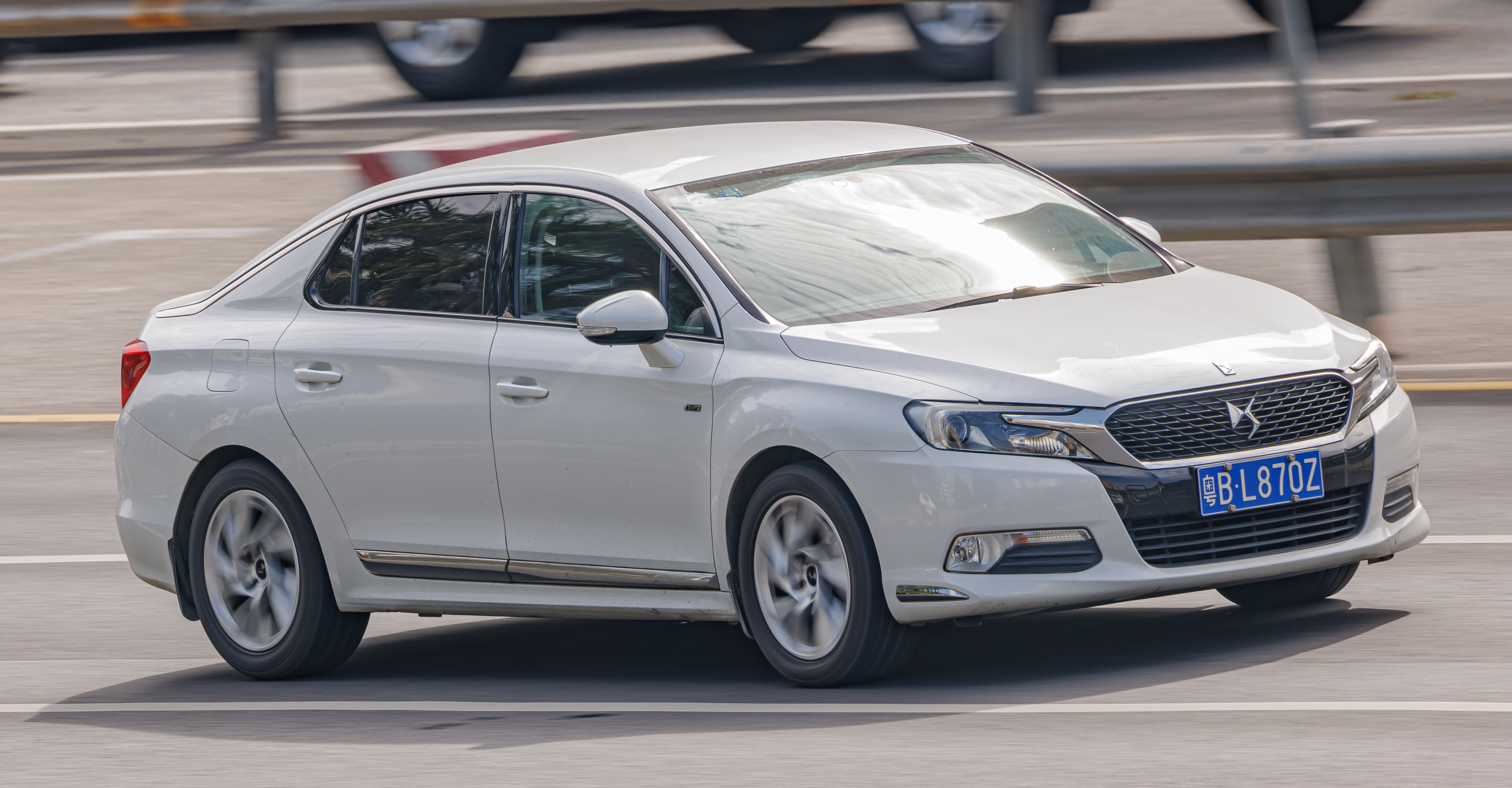

Overview
- Manufacturer: DS Automobiles
- Production: 2014–2019
- Assembly: Shenzhen, China (Changan PSA)

Body and chassis
- Class: Compact executive car (D)
- Body style: 4-door sedan
- Layout: Front-engine, front-wheel-drive layout
- Platform: PSA PF2
- Related: DS 4S

Powertrain
- Engine: 1.6L Turbocharged THP 160 Inline-four; 1.6L Turbocharged THP 200 Inline-four; 1.8L Inline-four
- Transmission: 5-speed Manual; 6-speed Automatic

Dimensions
- Wheelbase: 2,715 mm (106.9 in)
- Length: 4,702 mm (185.1 in)
- Width: 1,840 mm (72.4 in)
- Height: 1,510 mm (59.4 in)

Chronology
- Successor: DS 9

The DS 5LS is a premium compact executive car and the first traditional sedan to have been designed and developed by the DS division of the French automaker PSA Peugeot Citroën; it was launched on March 28, 2014. It is the first DS model that applied "DS wing" front face design and wears independent DS logo and this model is considered as a declaration of the independence of DS brand. It was produced and sold only in China. Its hatchback version is the DS 4S.

== Gallery ==
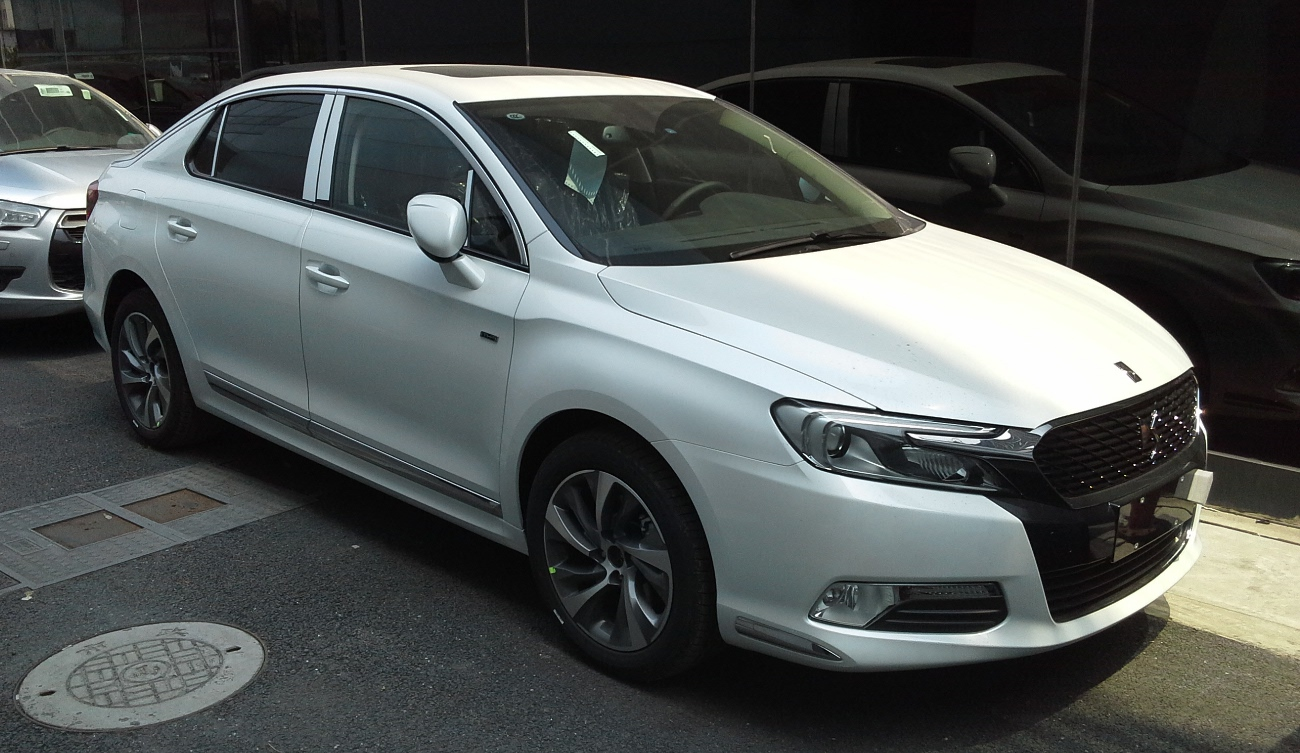
DS 5LS front.

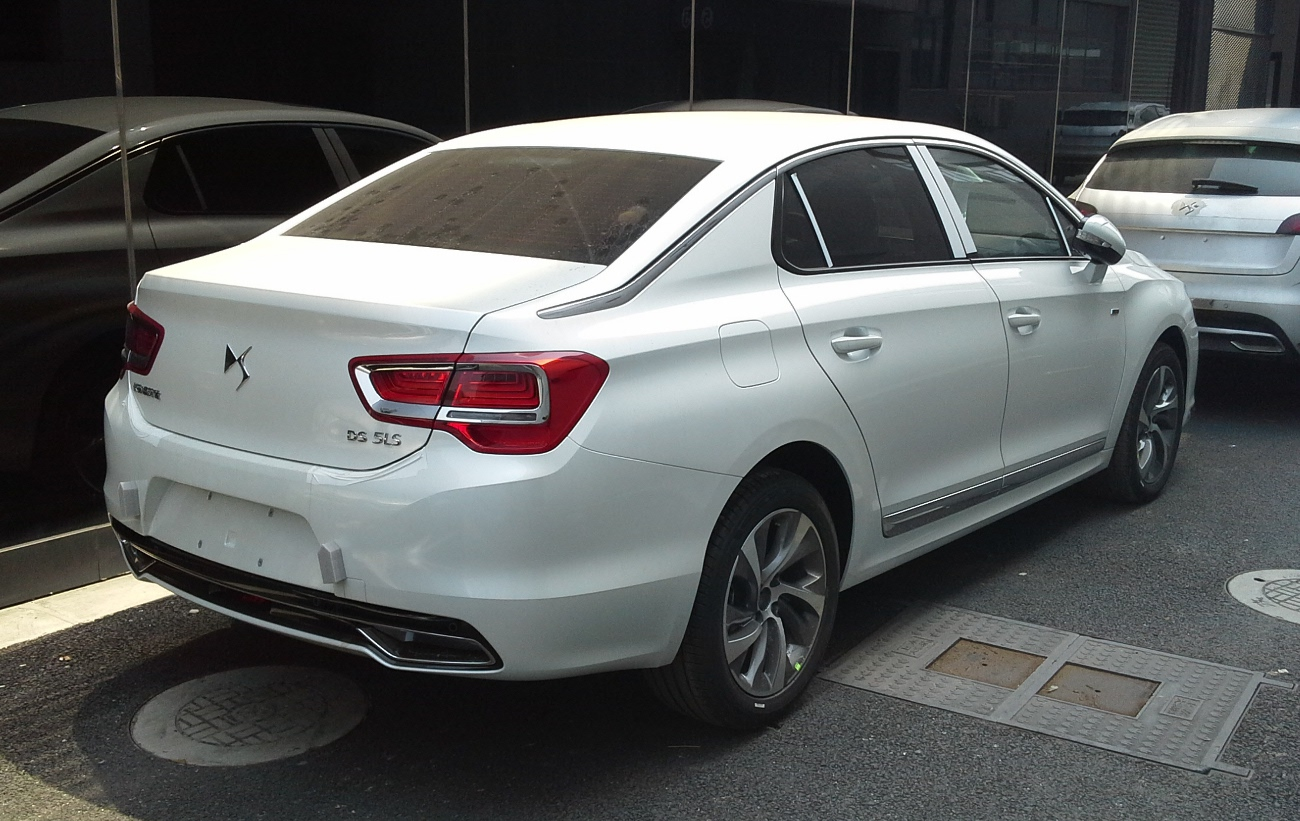
DS 5LS rear.

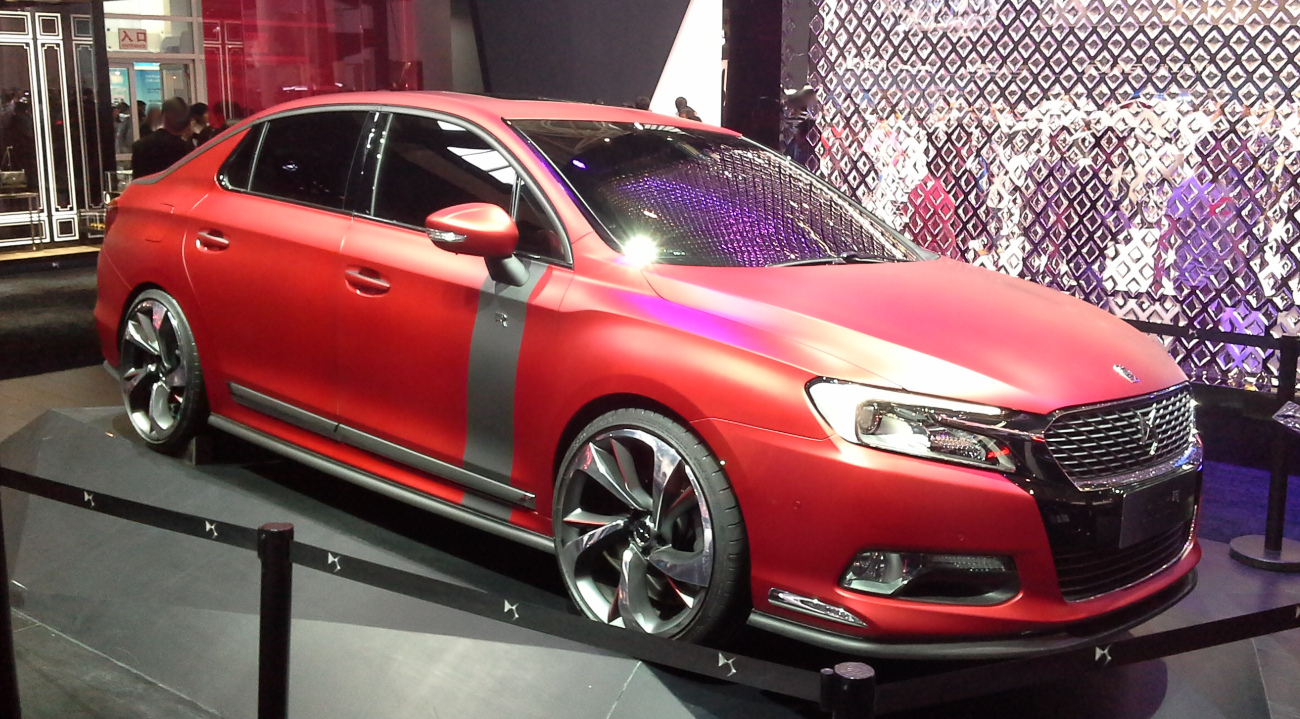
DS 5LS R Concept at 2014 Auto China

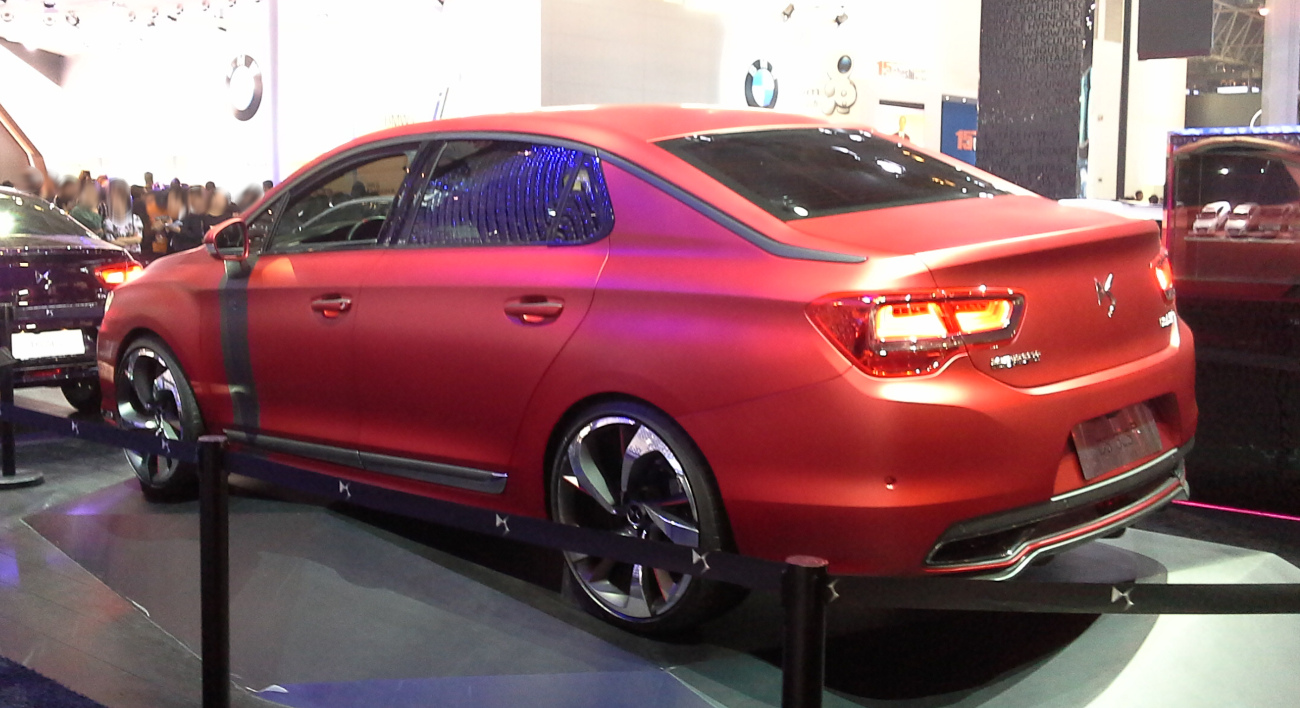
DS 5LS R Concept at 2014 Auto China

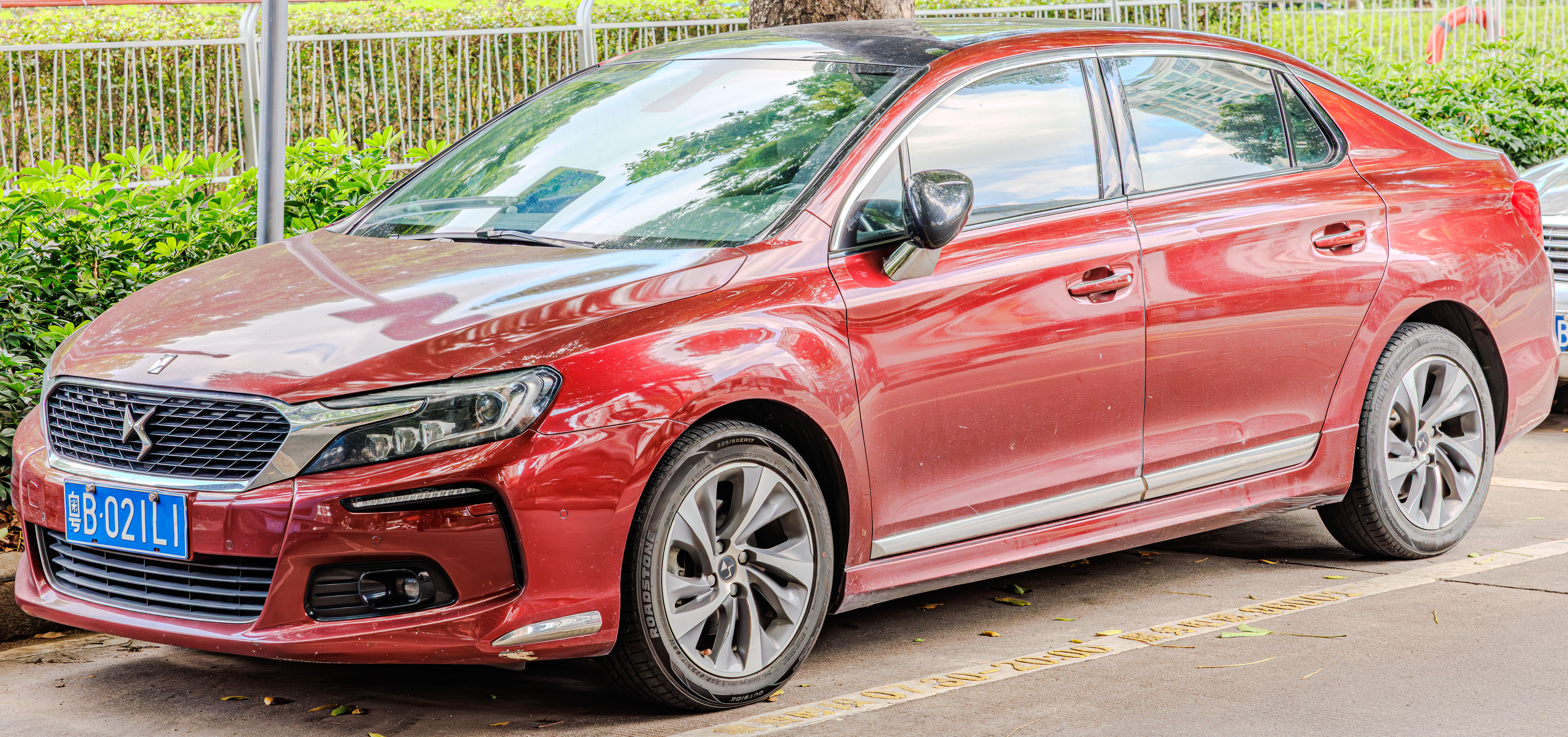
Facelift

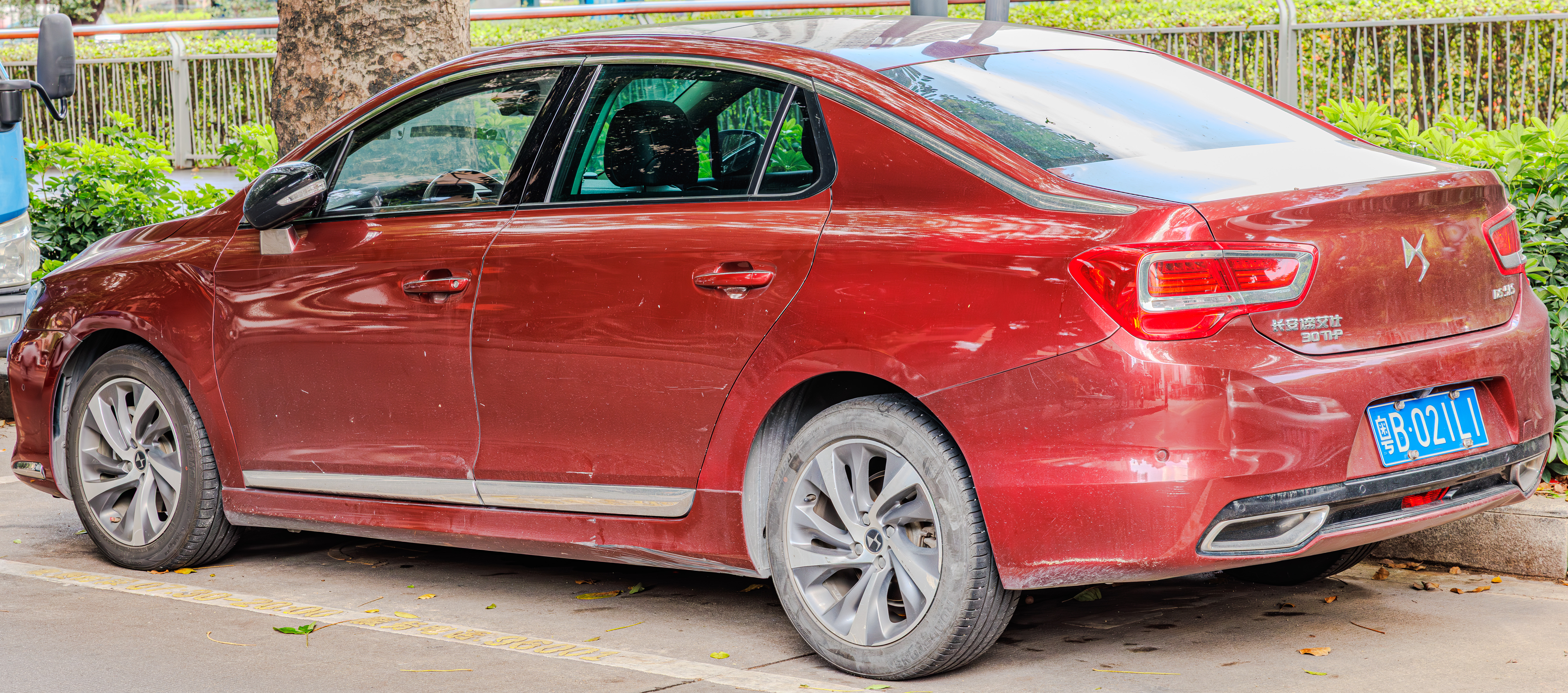
Facelift (rear)
