= Changan PSA =

Automobile company in China

Changan PSA Automobiles Co., Ltd.
- Company type: Joint venture
- Industry: Automotive
- Founded: November 2011
- Defunct: 2020
- Successor: Baoneng Group's Shenzhen plant
- Headquarters: Shenzhen, China
- Area served: China
- Key people: Olivier Mornet (President); Ying Zhanwang (Executive Vice President)
- Products: Automobiles
- Owner: Changan Automobile (50%); Groupe PSA (50%)
- Website: www.ds.com.cn

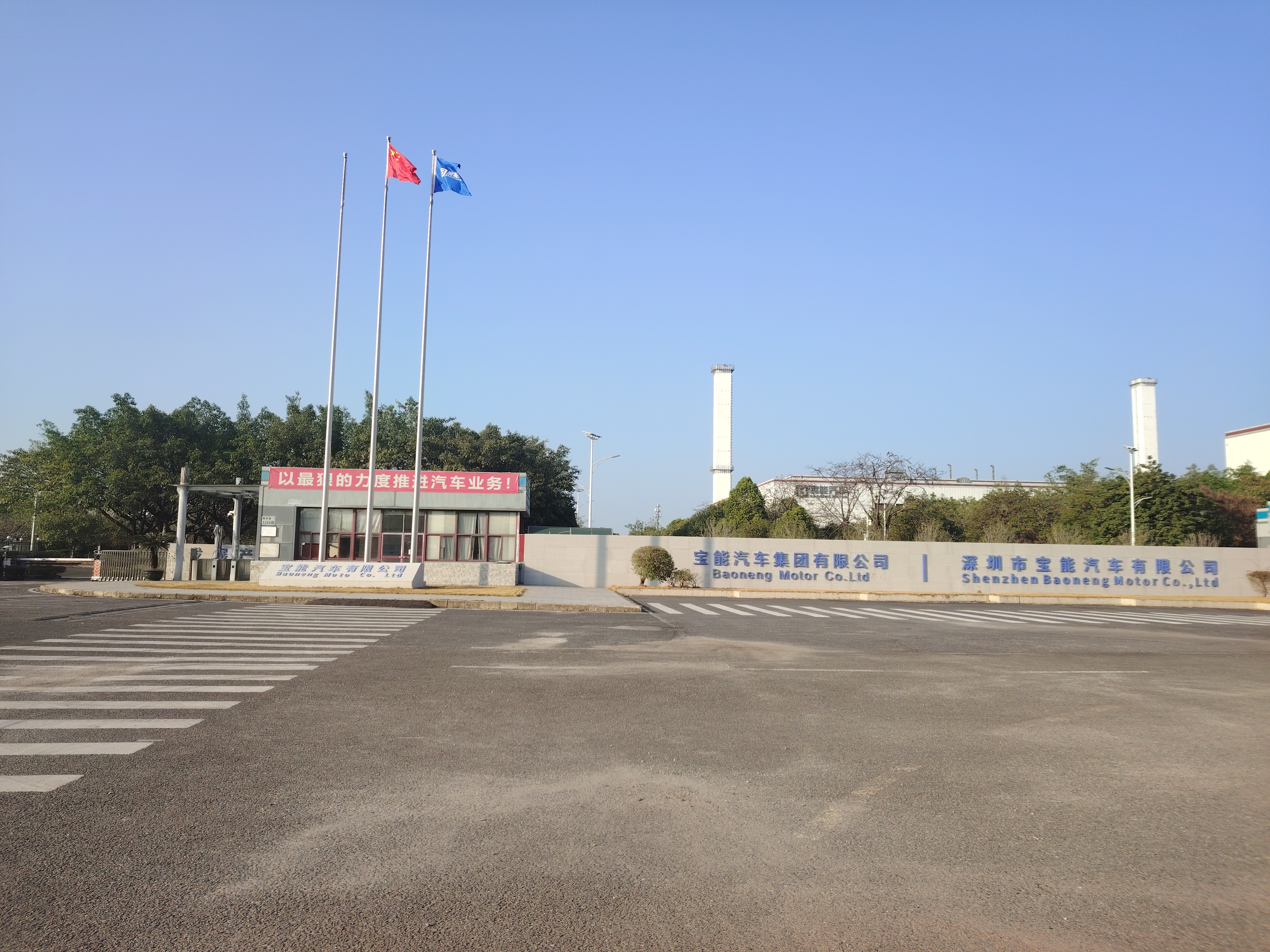
The main gate of Baoneng Automobile Group's headquarters, located in Guanlan, Longhua District, Shenzhen, is the former headquarters of Changan PSA.

Changan PSA (officially Changan PSA Automobiles Co., Ltd., informally CAPSA) was an automobile company headquartered in Shenzhen, China, a 50:50 joint venture between Changan Automobile and Groupe PSA. Its principal activity was the manufacture and sale of DS Automobiles branded passenger cars for China.

Changan PSA was Groupe PSA's second automobile joint venture in China, after Dongfeng Peugeot-Citroën. Centering on a newly built production base in Shenzhen, it had an annual production capacity of 200,000 vehicles.

== History ==
In 2010, Changan and Groupe PSA agreed to establish a 50:50 joint venture to produce passenger cars for the Chinese market, and final approval for the project was gained in 2011.

Manufacturing commenced in 2014, with China specific DS models; the DS 5, the DS 5LS first and then the DS 6WR.

The venture got consistently poor sales, leading to production levels below capacity. It was dissolved in 2020 after both Changan and Groupe PSA agreed to transfer their respective stakes to the Baoneng Group.

The newly restructured venture was renamed Shenzhen Baoneng Motor.

== Sales ==
DS sales in China rose sharply to 26,000 units in 2014, driven by a premium offering composed of the DS 5, DS 5LS and DS 6. All three models are produced in Shenzhen and were launched in a single year.

At the same time, the brand is busy developing its distribution network, with 80 DS Stores covering the 60 largest Chinese cities.

China currently accounts for 22% of DS registrations globally, compared with just 2% in 2013.

== Products ==
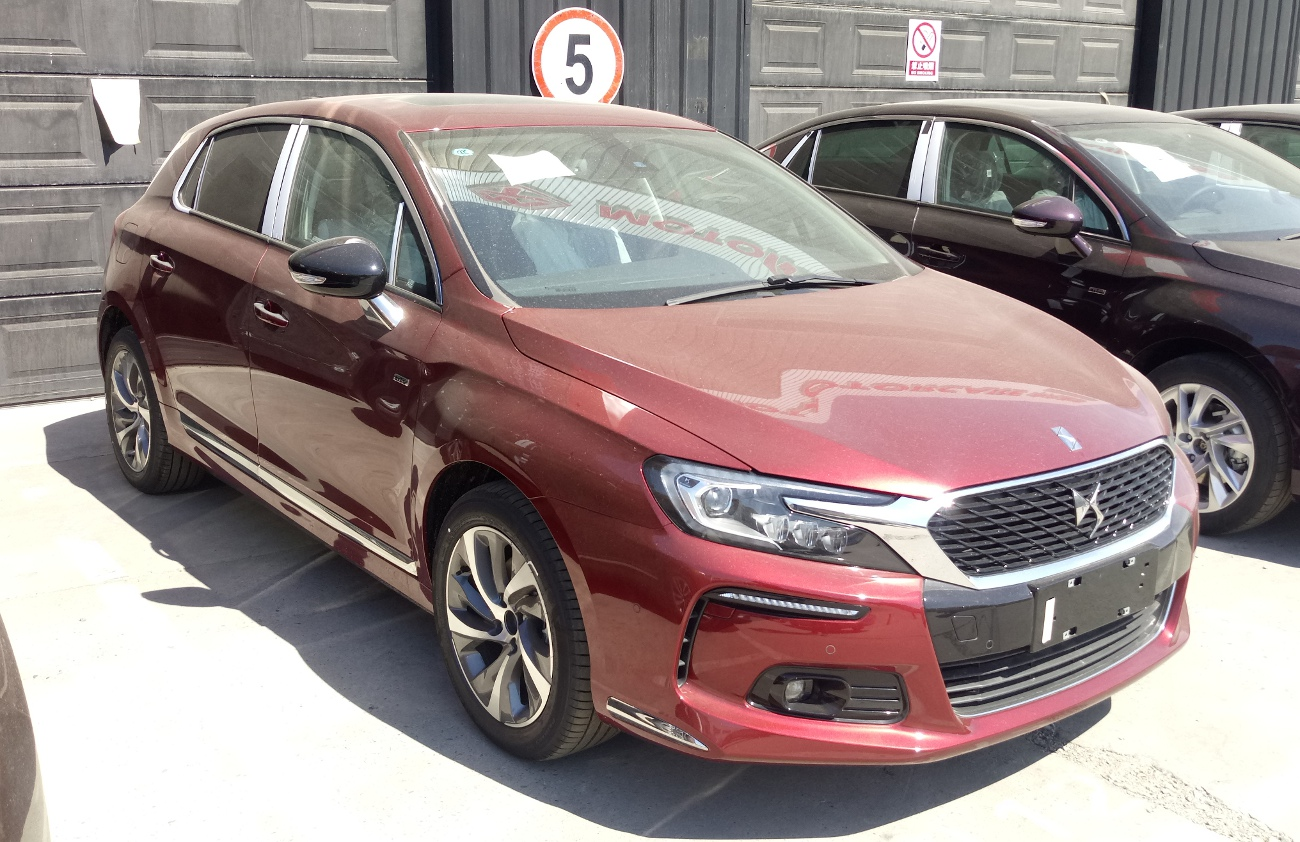
DS 4S

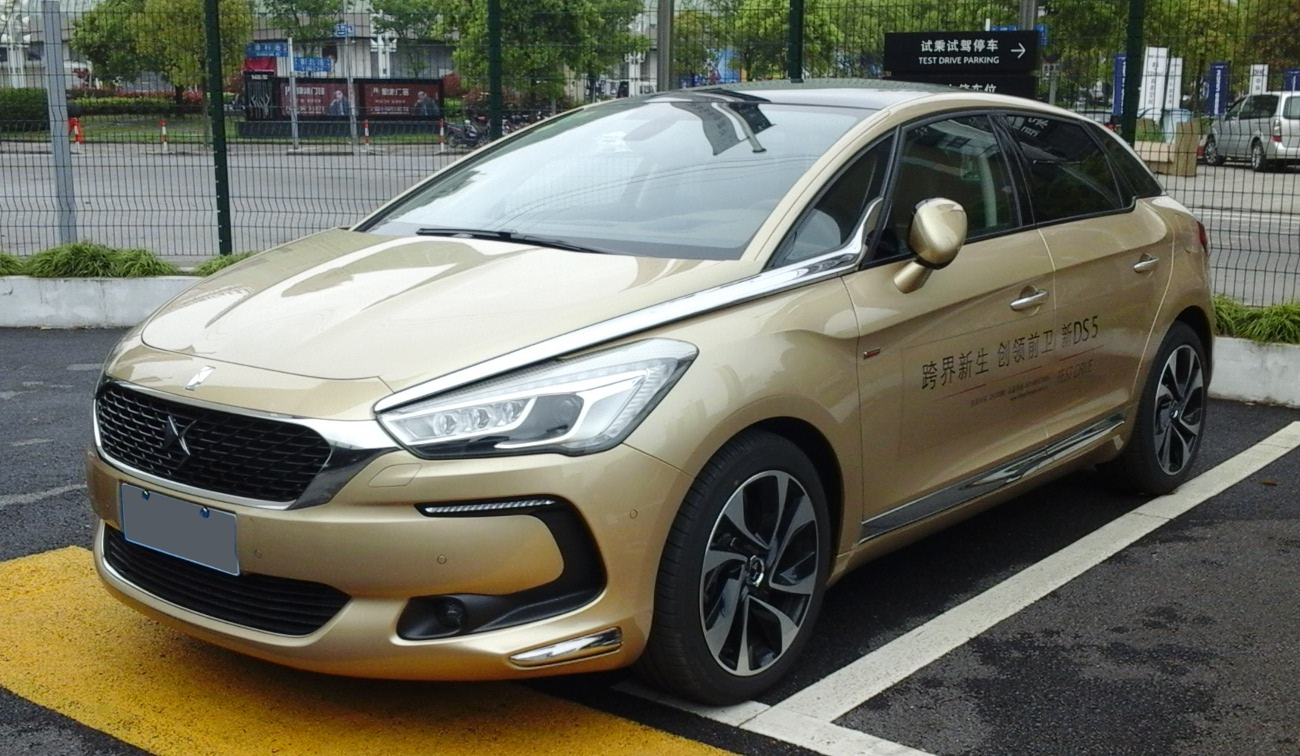
DS 5

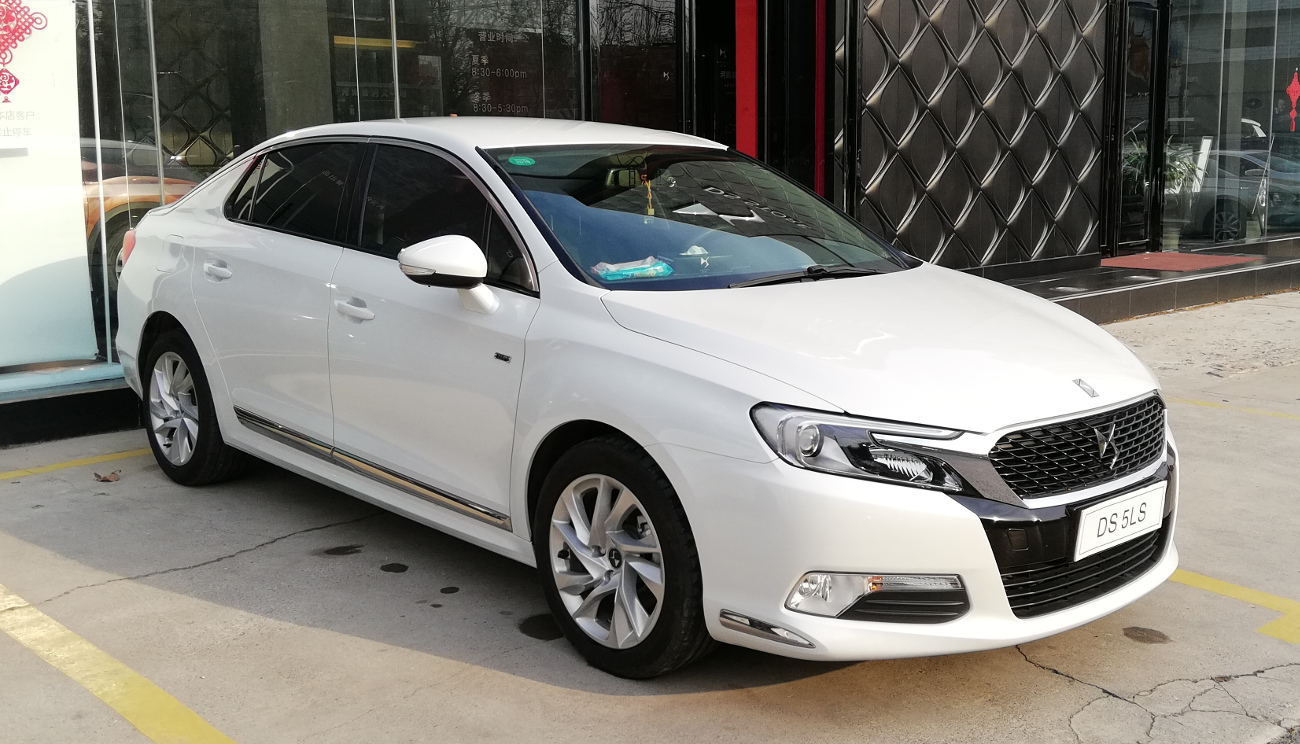
DS 5LS

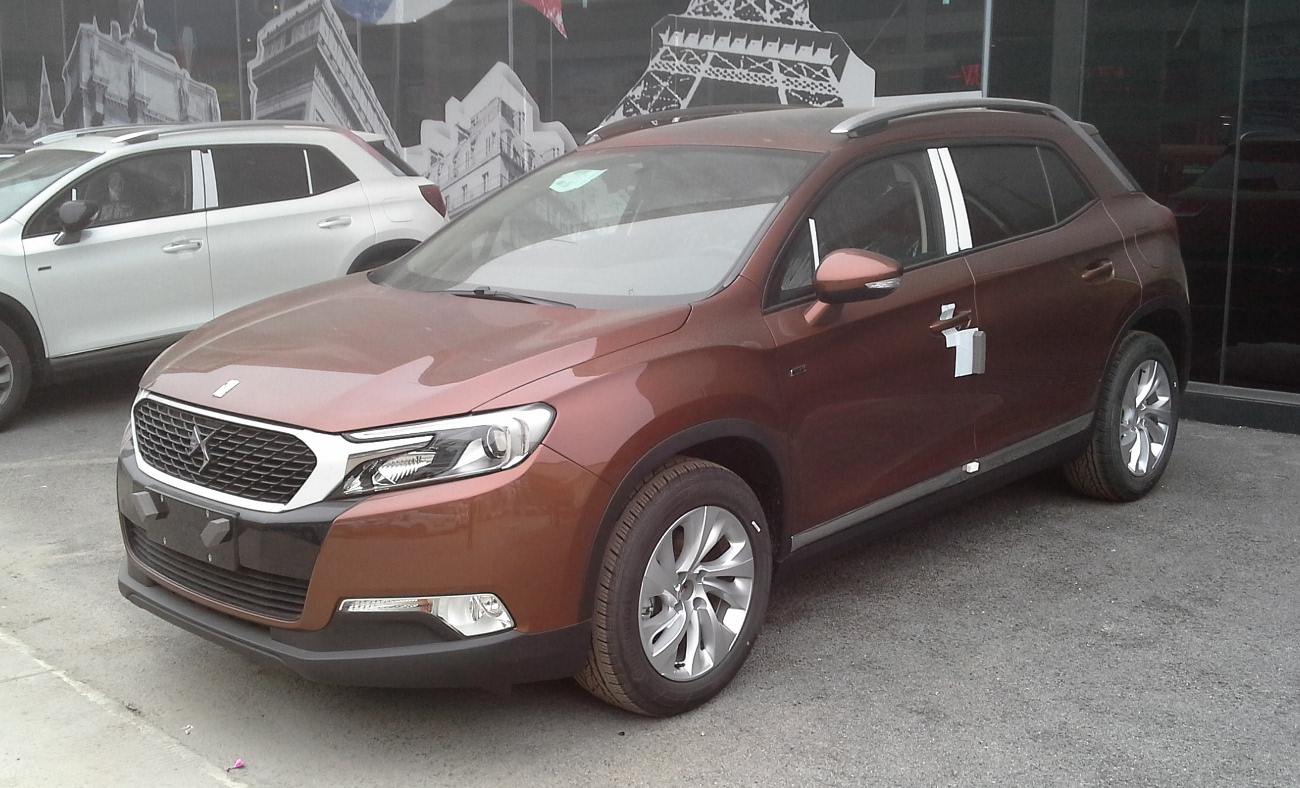
DS 6WR

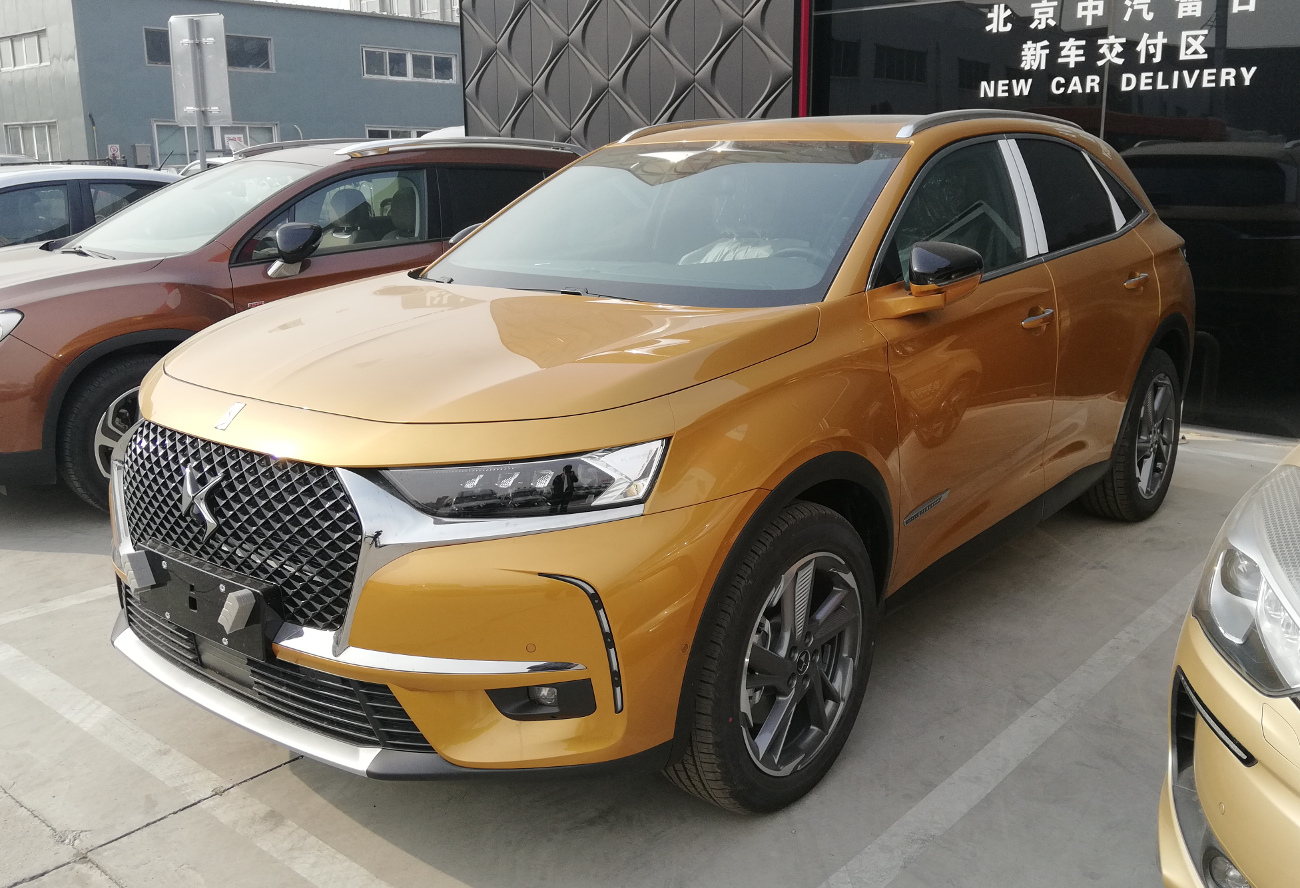
DS 7
