= Hypnos (disambiguation) =

Hypnos is the personification of sleep in Greek mythology.

Hypnos may also refer to:

- Hypnos (fish), a genus of electric rays in the family Torpedinidae
- "Hypnos" (short story), a short story by H. P. Lovecraft
- Hypno, a Pokémon
- Hypnos T-type Tyrant, an enemy in the video game Resident Evil Survivor
- 14827 Hypnos, an asteroid
- Citroën Hypnos, a concept car
- Hypnos (band), a Czech death metal band
- Hypnos (album), 2022 album by Ravyn Lenae
