= DS Automobiles =

French premium car marque of Stellantis

- Product type: Luxury vehicles
- Current owner: Stellantis (since 2021)
- Produced by: Stellantis France
- Country: France
- Introduced: February 5, 2009; 17 years ago (as a Citroën brand); June 1, 2014; 12 years ago (as an independent brand); May 21, 2026; 5 months ago (as a Citroën brand)
- Related brands: Citroën
- Markets: Europe (except Ireland (left in 2024), Sweden (left in 2022), Scandinavia (left in 2022) & Southeastern Europe), Argentina, Chile, French Guiana, Ecuador, Martinique, Colombia, Guadeloupe, Morocco, Reunion, Egypt, Japan, Israel, China (until 2023), South Korea (until 2024), Singapore (until 2024), Palestine, New Caledonia
- Previous owners: Citroën (2009–2015); PSA Group (2015–2021)
- Ambassador: Xavier Peugeot (CEO of DS brand)
- Website: dsautomobiles.com

DS Automobiles is a French luxury-premium marque created in 2009. Formerly part of Citroën, DS has been a standalone brand ultimately owned by PSA Group, and later Stellantis. The independent DS marque was created in 2014 from the former DS subbrand and line of models of Citroën cars made since 2009, although it had been separated from Citroën in Asia since 2012.

The name DS is considered a nod to the classic executive car Citroën DS. The name is also a play on words, as in French it is pronounced like the word déesse, meaning "goddess".

== History ==
The PSA Group originally consisted of three automobile brands, Peugeot, Citroën and the soon dropped Talbot, but none was considered a "premium" brand. Since 1976, PSA has experimented with differentiating the brands by price level, similar to Chevrolet/Buick or Volkswagen/Audi, but neither brand had the strength to justify premium pricing. By launching the DS line, Groupe PSA decided to build on the design heritage of the original Citroën DS (1955–1975) designed by Flaminio Bertoni and André Lefèbvre.

The DS line started with the Citroën DS3 in the beginning of 2010, a small car based on the floorpan of the new C3. The DS3 is based on the concept of the Citroën C3 Pluriel model and the Citroën DS Inside concept car, and customisable with various roof colours that can contrast with the body panels. It was named 2010 Car of the Year by Top Gear Magazine, awarded first supermini four times in a row by the J.D. Power Satisfaction Survey UK, and the second most efficient supermini (Citroën DS3 1.6 eHDi 115 Airdream: True MPG 63.0mpg) by What Car? behind the Citroën C3.

In 2013, the Citroën DS3 was again the best-selling premium subcompact car with 40% of the market share in Europe. The DS series is deeply connected to Citroën, as the DS4, launched in 2010, is based on the 2008 Citroën Hypnos concept car and the DS5, following in 2011, is based on the concept car of 2005, the Citroën C-SportLounge.

According to PSA CEO Carlos Tavares, DS would keep using the same platforms and dealerships as other PSA models, but would distinguish itself from Citroën cars by using "separate manufacturing and engineering standards".

== Overview and markets ==
=== Logo ===
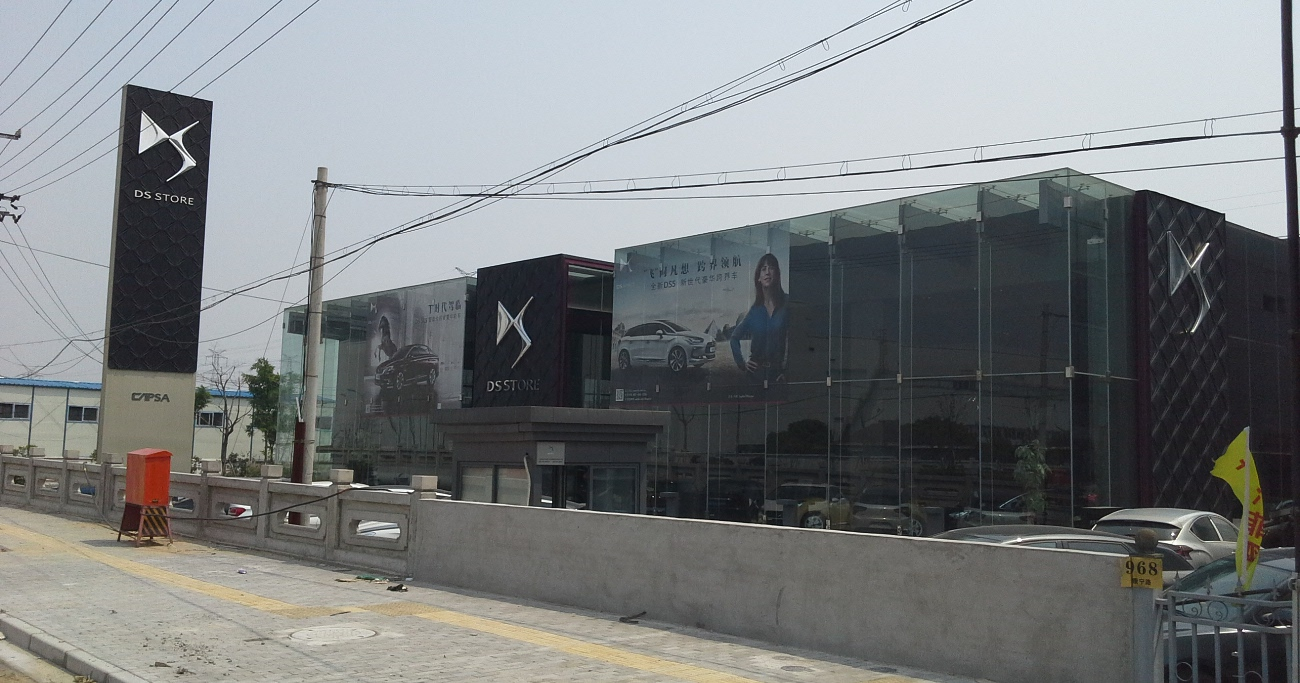
DS Store in Shanghai, China

The DS Automobiles rear badge is a new logo rather than the Citroën double chevron, and all have different styling compared to their equivalent Citroën car. This logo was designed by Korean designer Jin Joo. Citroën produced several concept sports cars, with the fully working Citroën Survolt being badged as a DS. A 2014 concept car, the DS Divine, develops the Survolt prototype as the future sport coupé of the DS range.

=== Chinese market ===
In China, DS vehicles have been sold in separate dealerships since 2014. DS models for sale in China were produced by the Changan PSA joint venture based in Shenzhen until May 2020, when the factory was acquired by the Baoneng Group. The DS 5LS and DS 6WR are only sold in China. With the facelift of the DS5 in 2015, the DS brand was also separated from the Citroën brand in Europe, and standalone DS dealerships are planned worldwide.

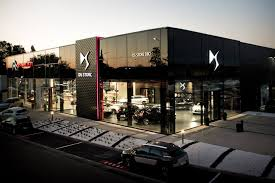
DS Store in France

In the end of 2023, DS Automobiles announced it was withdrawing from the Chinese market.

=== DS Store ===
The DS Store is the dealership network of DS Automobiles. It was introduced in China in 2014, and in Europe in 2015. In 2021, it was announced that a number of DS Store dealerships in the United Kingdom were set to close as a result of "poor volume and little return" of DS Automobiles vehicles, with just 233 new vehicle registrations in the United Kingdom for the company in March 2021. Despite the announcement, DS Automobiles announced a growth plan for the market in the United Kingdom at the end of March 2021, with the company claiming that "new dealerships and personal customer service" was pivotal for success in the British market.

In addition to DS Store dealerships, the company also operates the DS Only You privilege club which allows members to benefit from personalised services.

== Leadership ==
- Yves Bonnefont (2014–2020)
- Beatrice Foucher (2020–2023)
- Olivier François (2023–2025)
- Xavier Peugeot (2025–present)

== Models ==
=== Current models ===
- DS 3 (formerly DS 3 Crossback)
- DS No. 4 (formerly DS 4 (crossover))
- DS No. 7
- DS No. 8
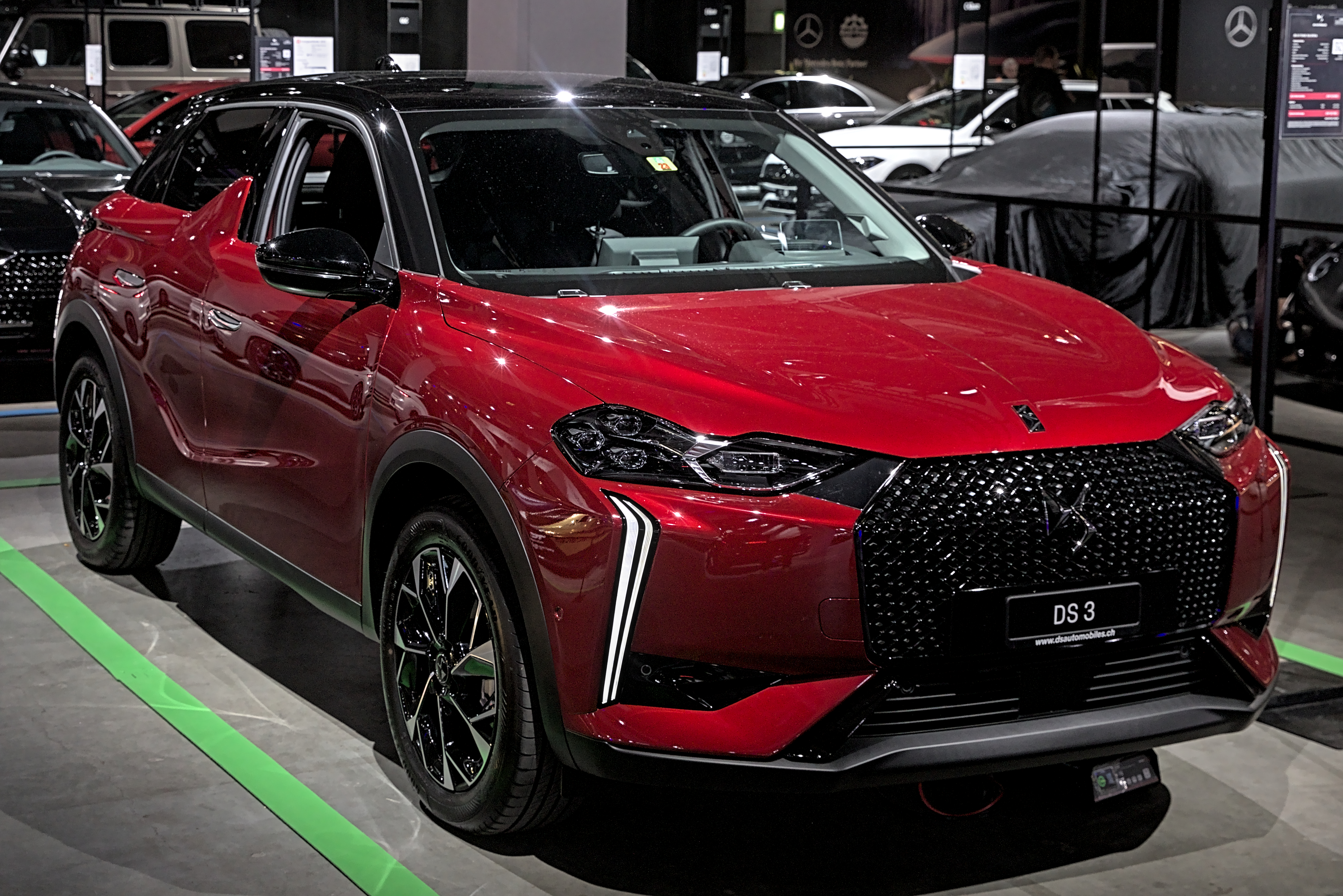
DS 3

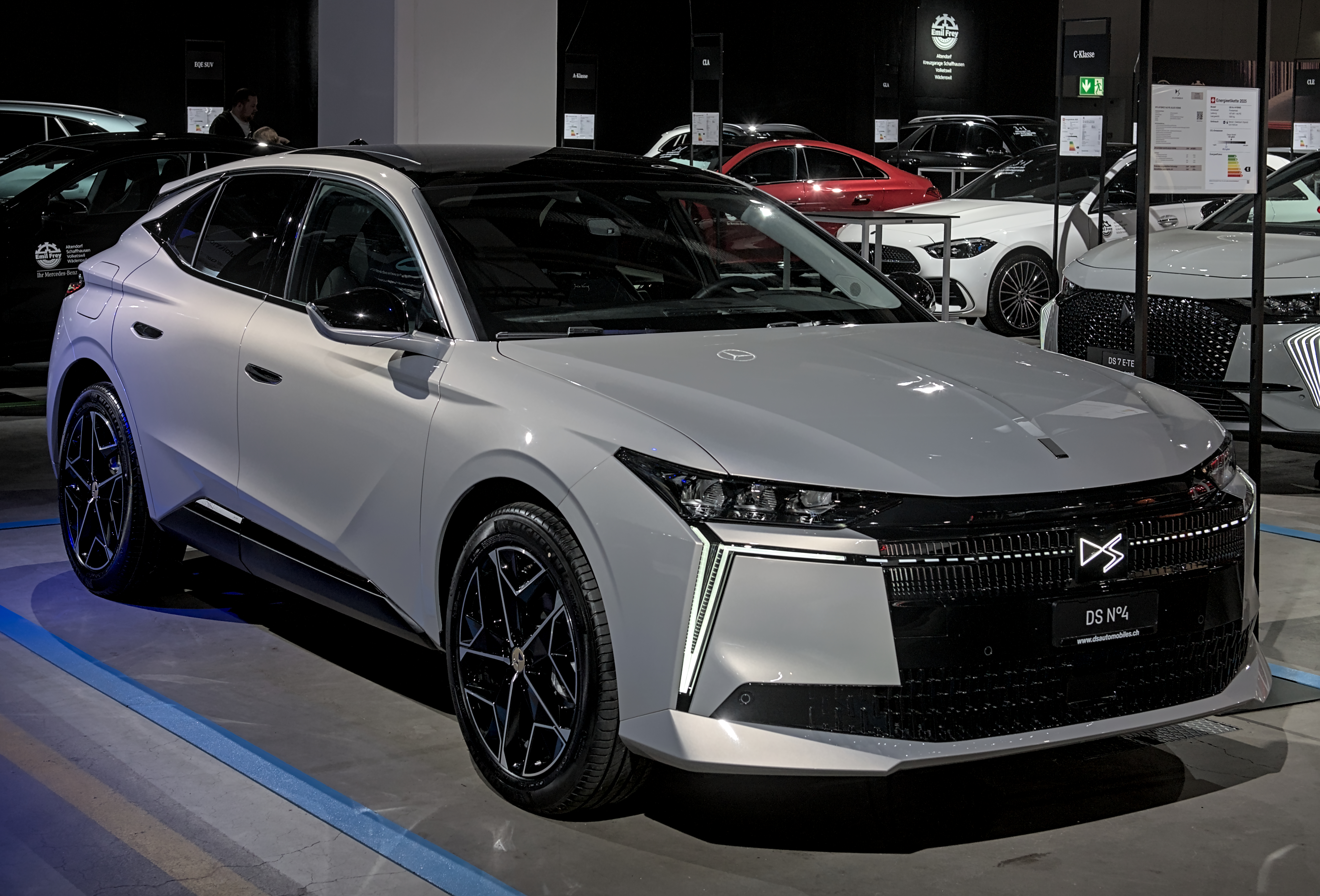
DS No. 4

DS No. 7

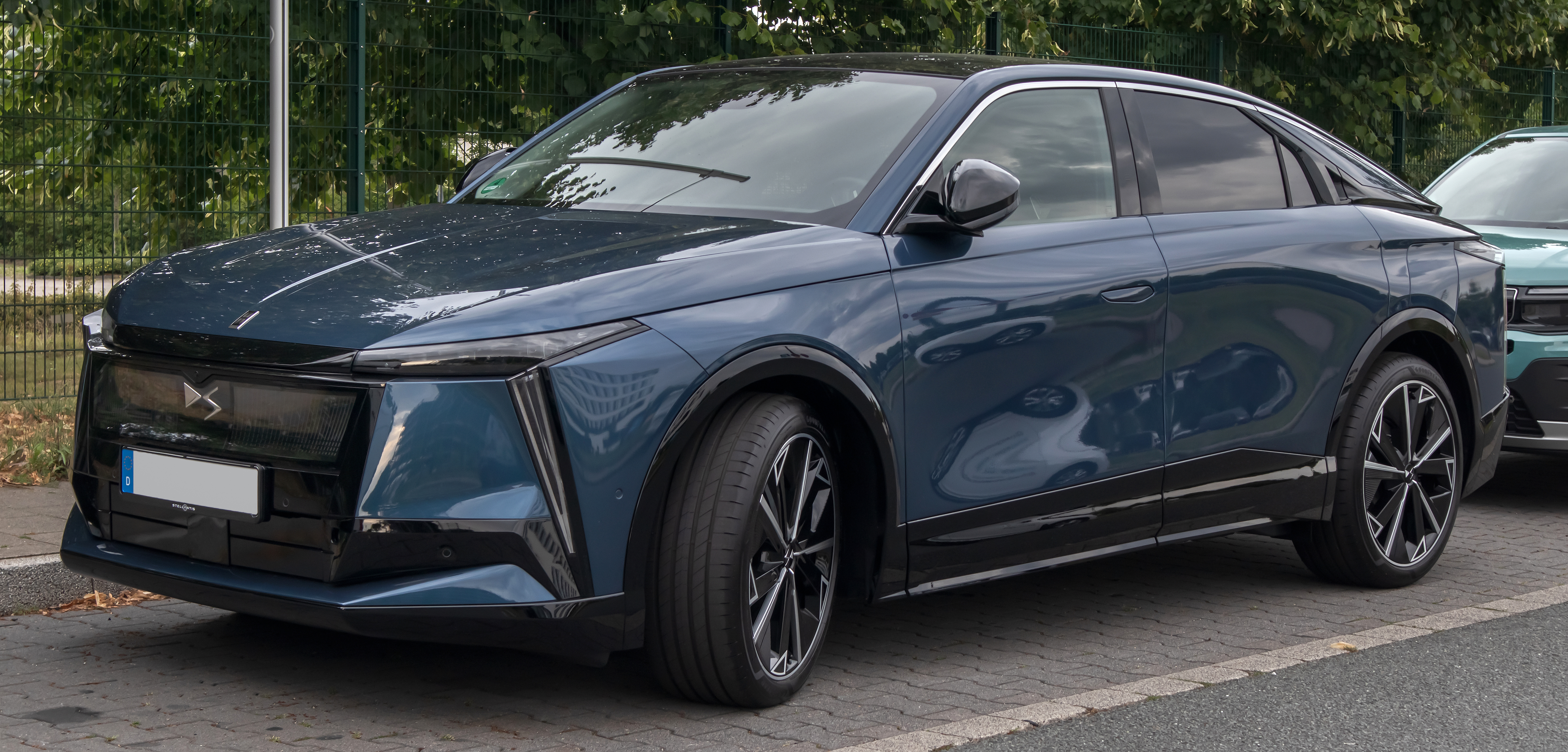
DS No. 8

=== Discontinued models ===
- DS 3 (hatchback)
- DS 4 (hatchback)
- DS 4S
- DS 5
- DS 5LS
- DS 6
- DS 7 (formerly DS 7 Crossback)
- DS 9
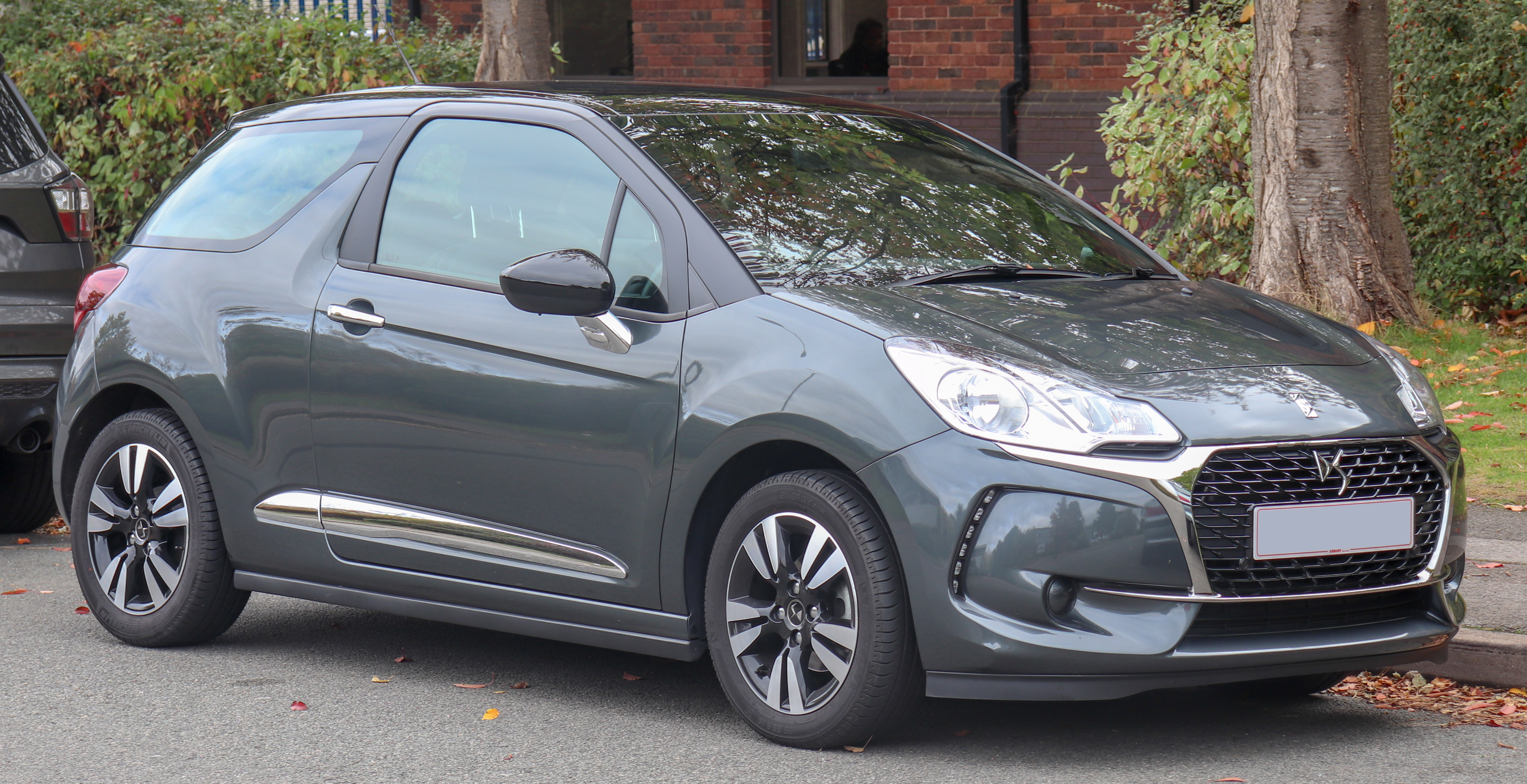
DS 3 (hatchback)

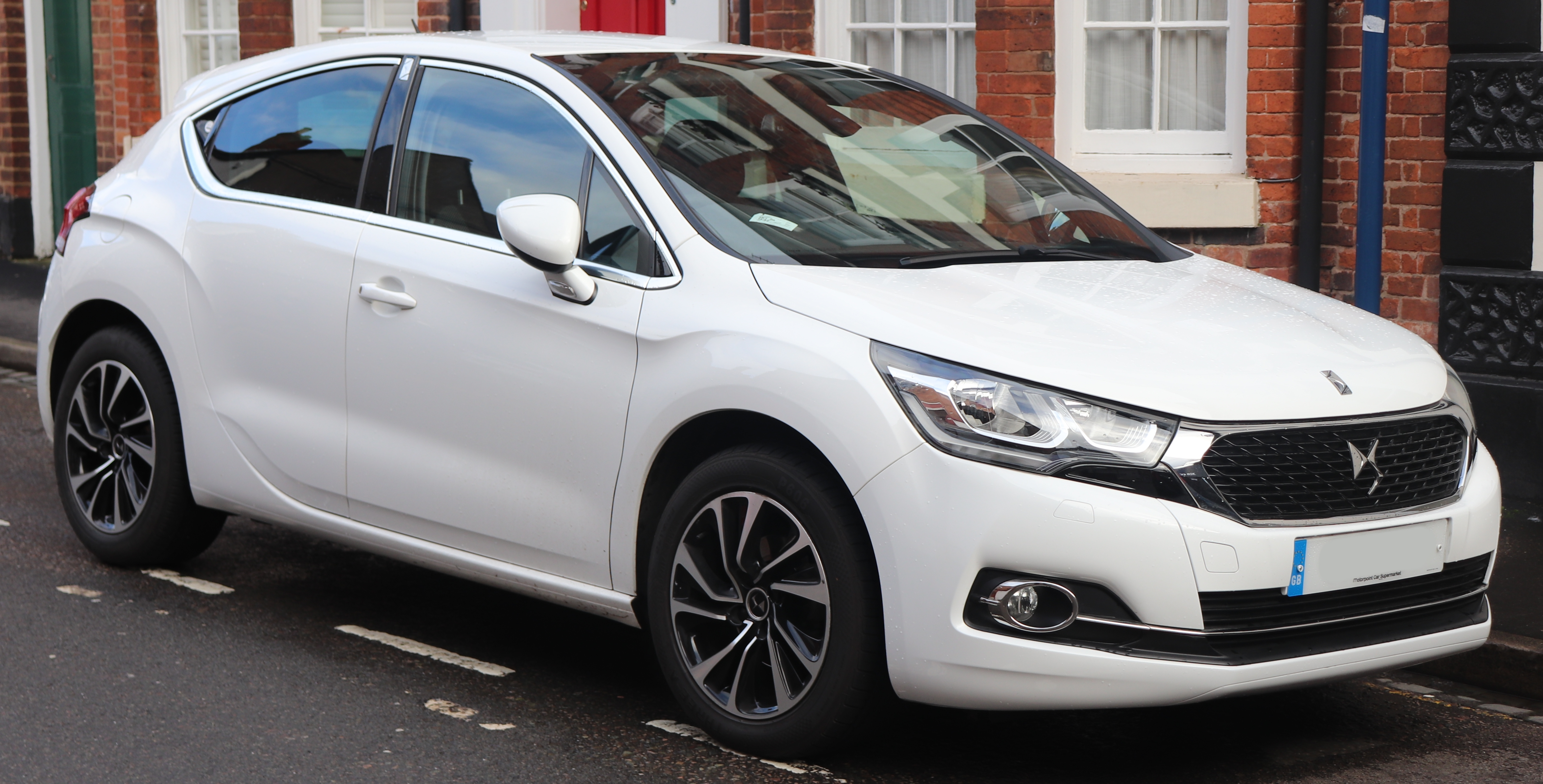
DS 4 (hatchback)

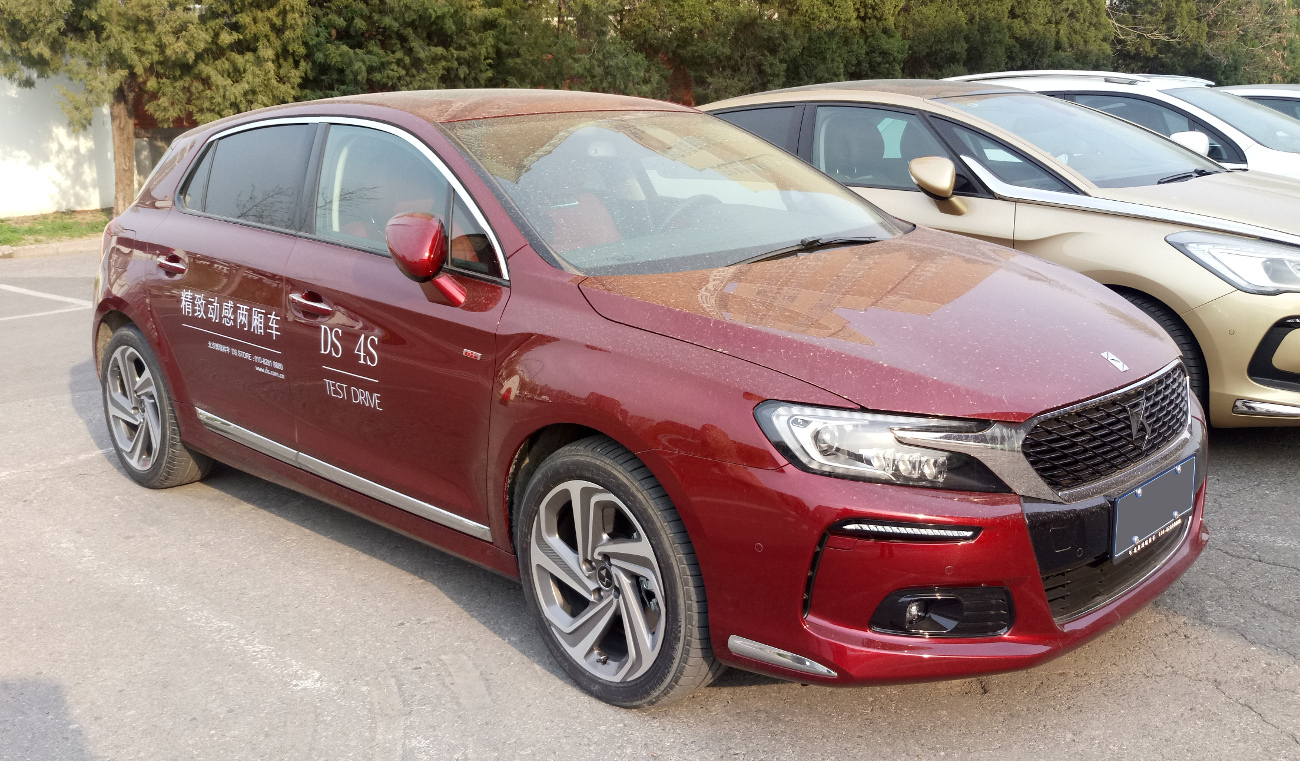
DS 4S

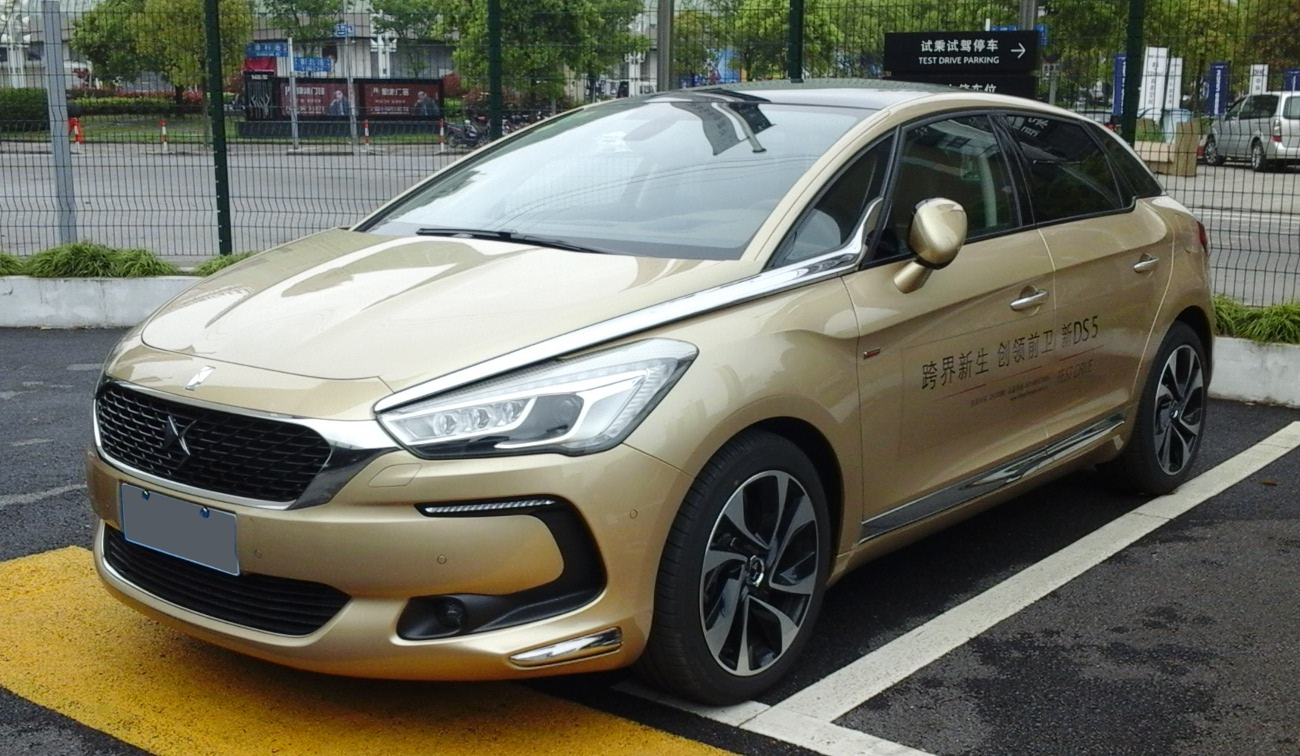
DS 5

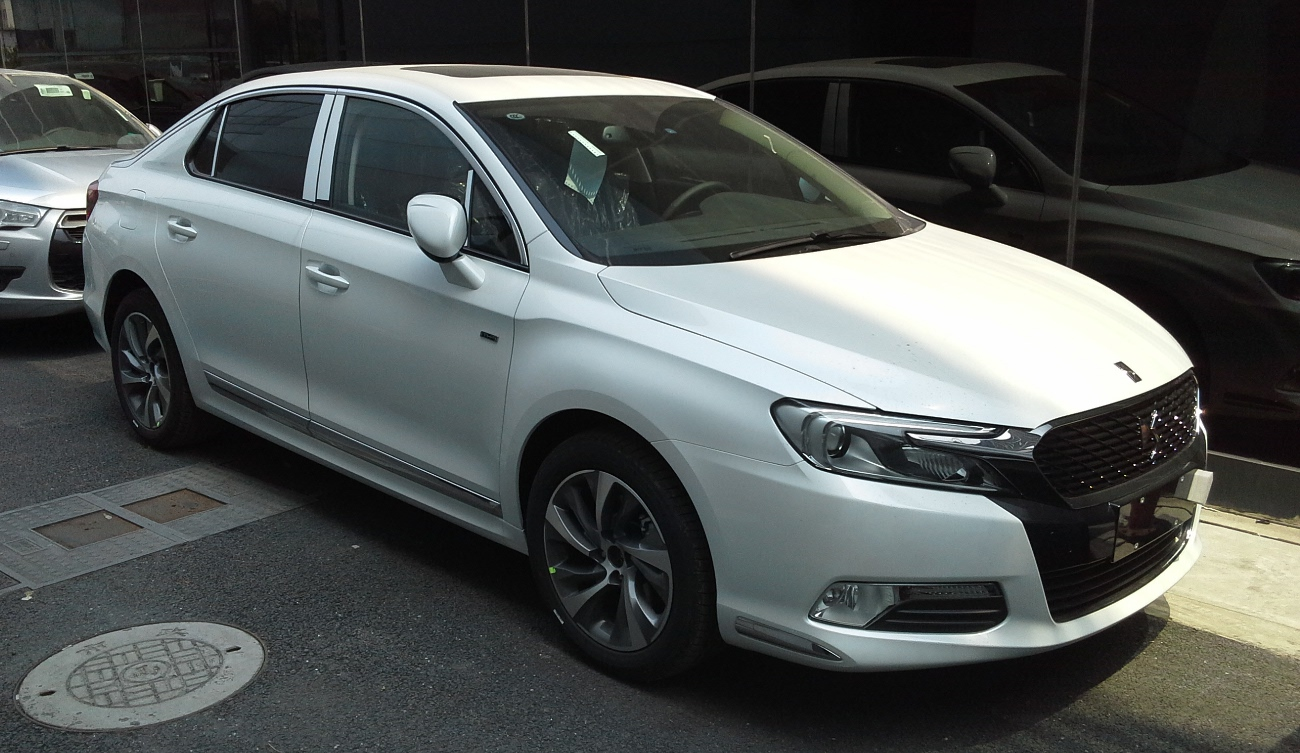
DS 5LS

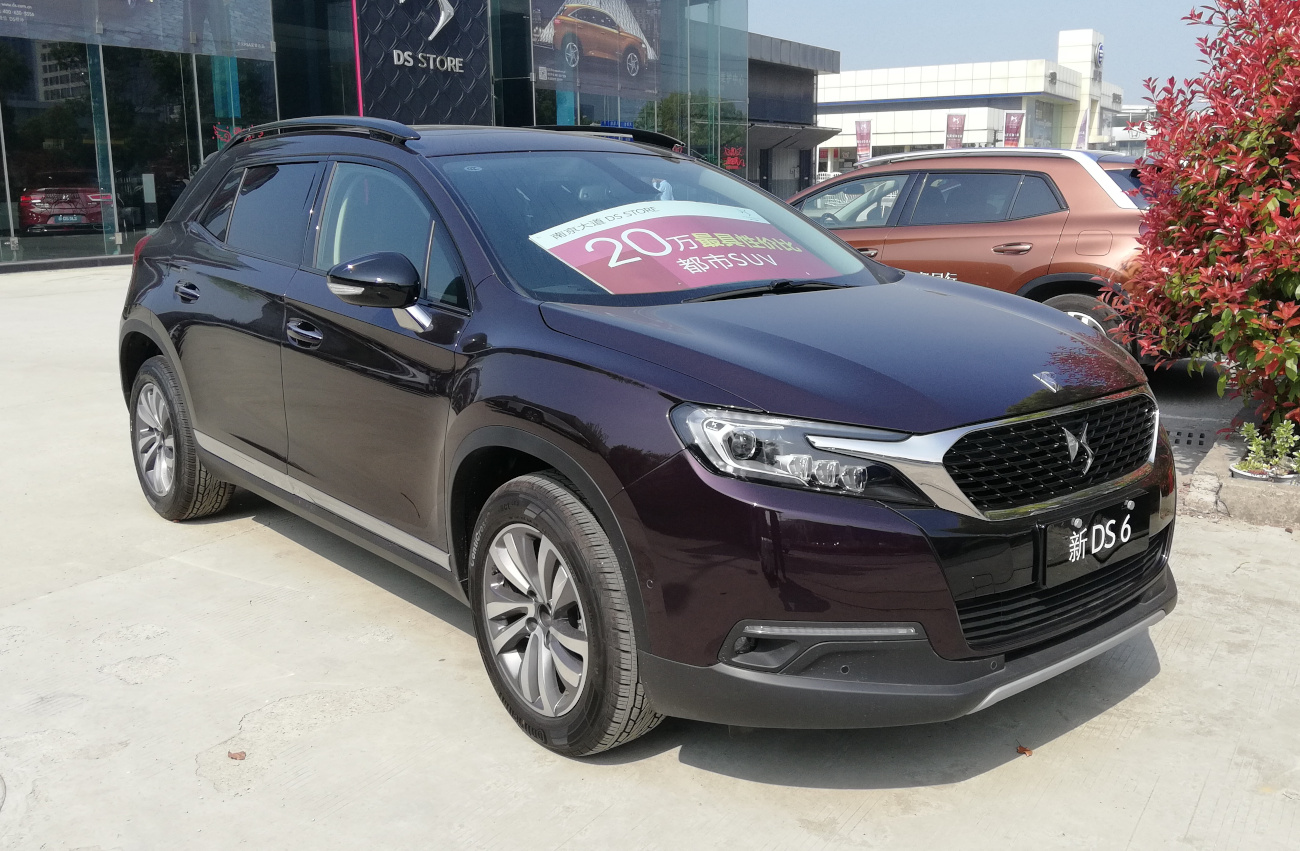
DS 6

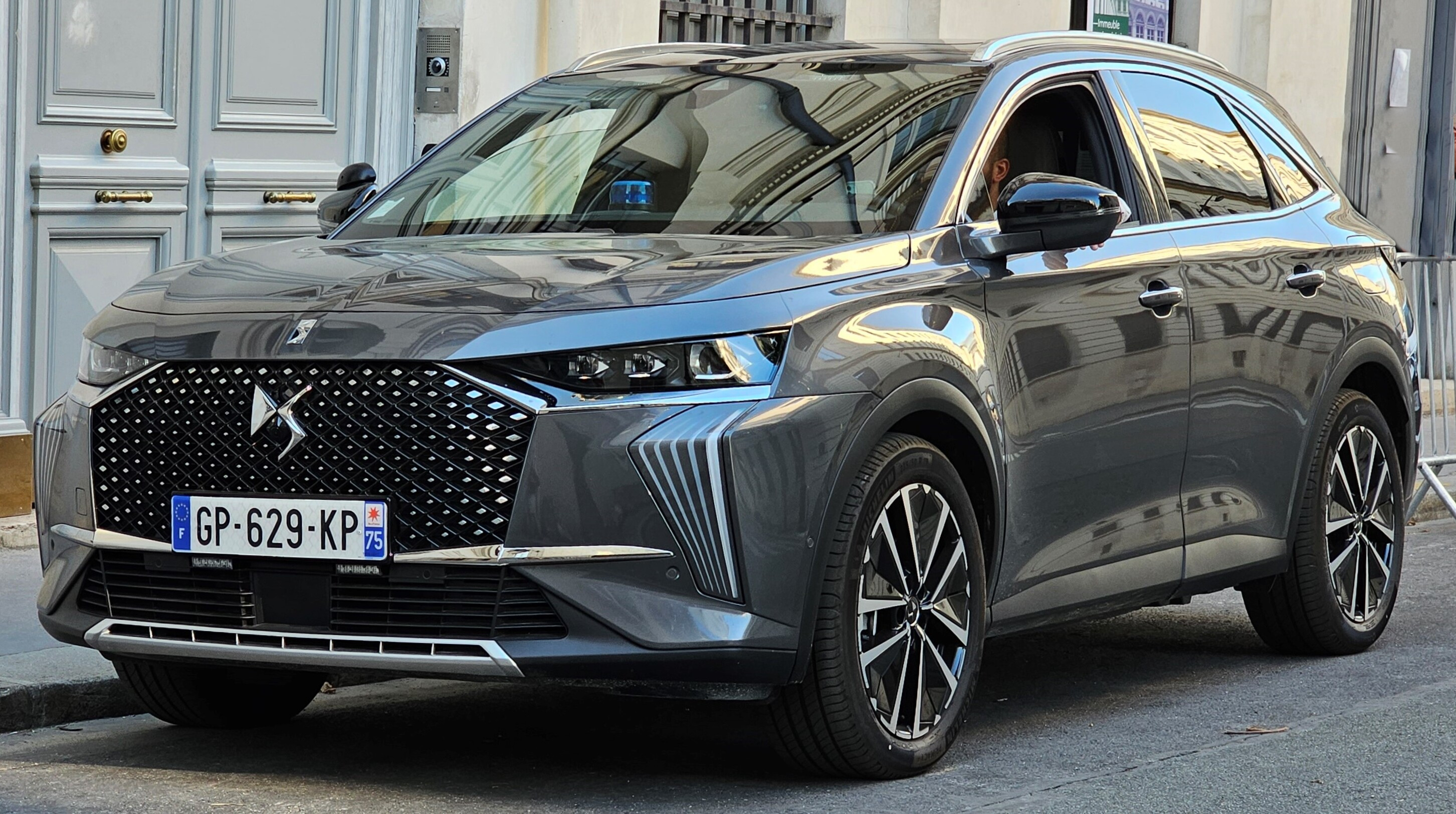
DS 7

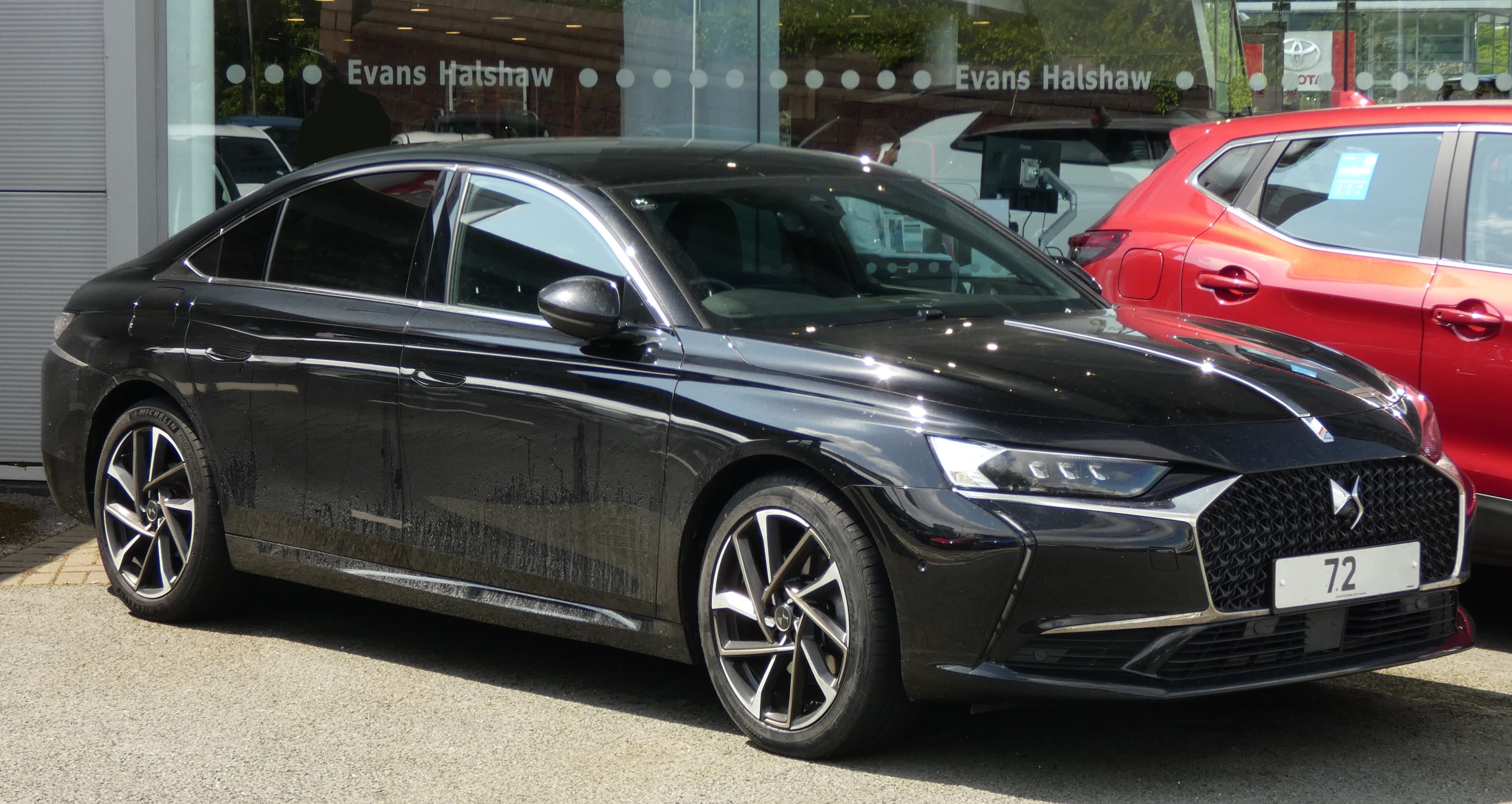
DS 9

=== Concept cars ===
- Citroën C-SportLounge (2008)
- Citroën Hypnos (2008), occasionally shown with DS emblem
- Citroën DS Inside (2009)
- Citroën REVOLTe (2009)
- Citroën DS High Rider (2010)
- Citroën Survolt (2010)
- Citroën DS4 Racing (2012)
- Citroën Numéro 9 (2012)
- DS Wild Rubis (2013)
- Citroën DS3 Cabrio Racing (2013)
- DS 5LS R (2014)
- Divine DS (2014)
- DS 3 & DS 3 Cabrio Ines de la Fressange Paris (2014)
- DS 4 Crossback (2015)
- DS E-Tense and E-Tense Performance (2016, 2022 respectively)
- DS X E-Tense (2018)
- DS Code X (2019)
- DS Aero Sport Lounge (2020)
- DS SM Tribute (2024)
- DS F3VER (2026)
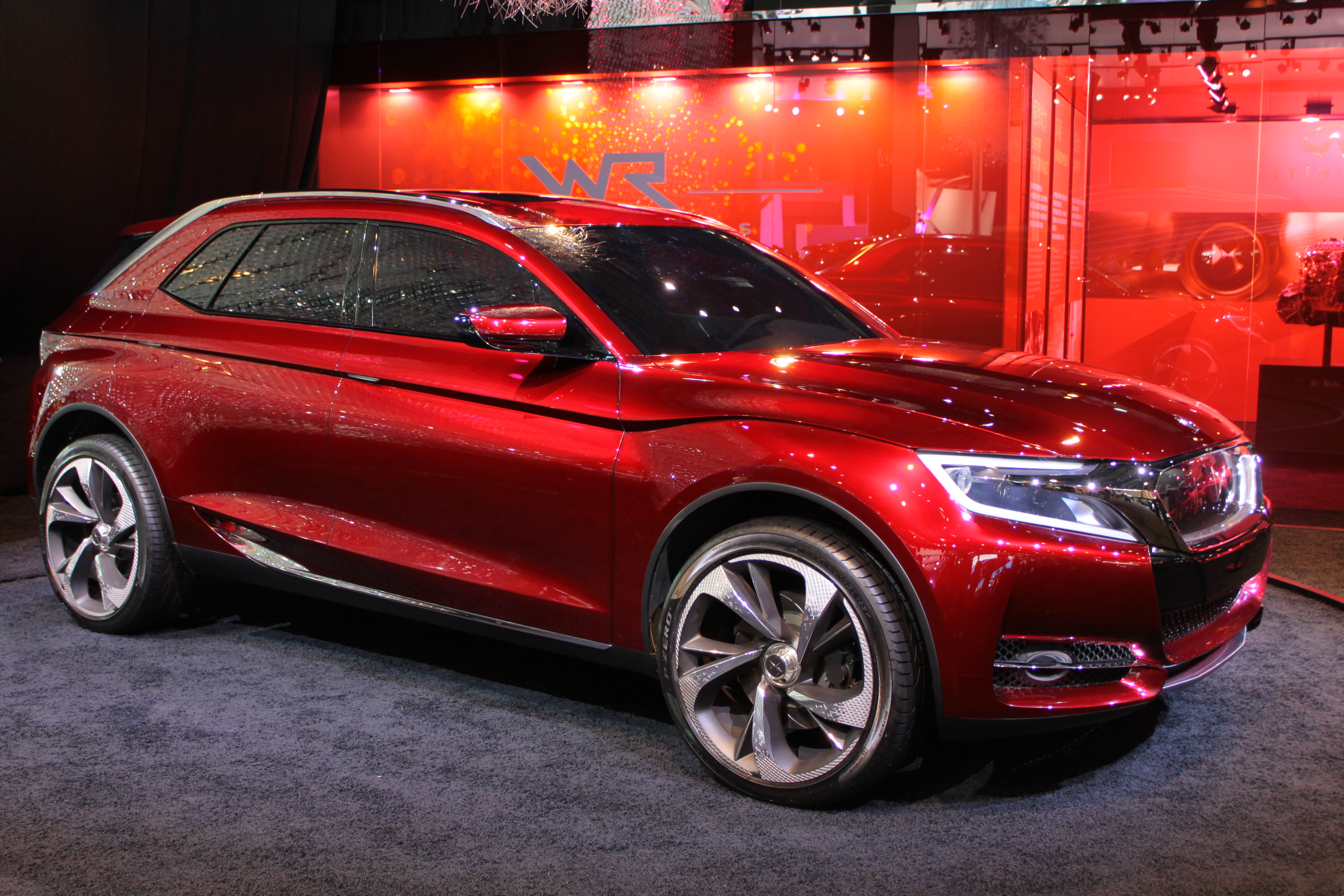
2013 DS Wild Rubis

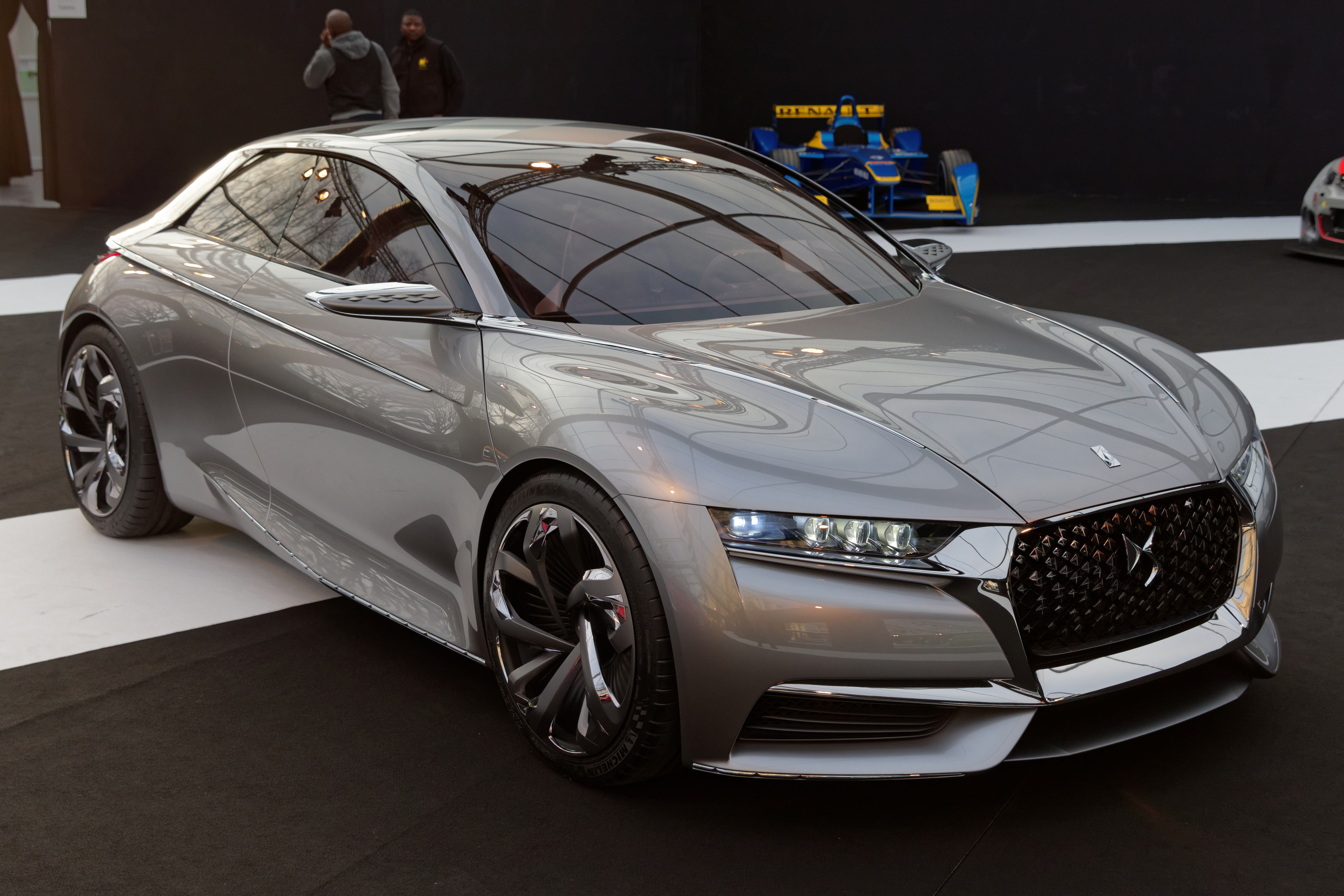
2014 DS Divine

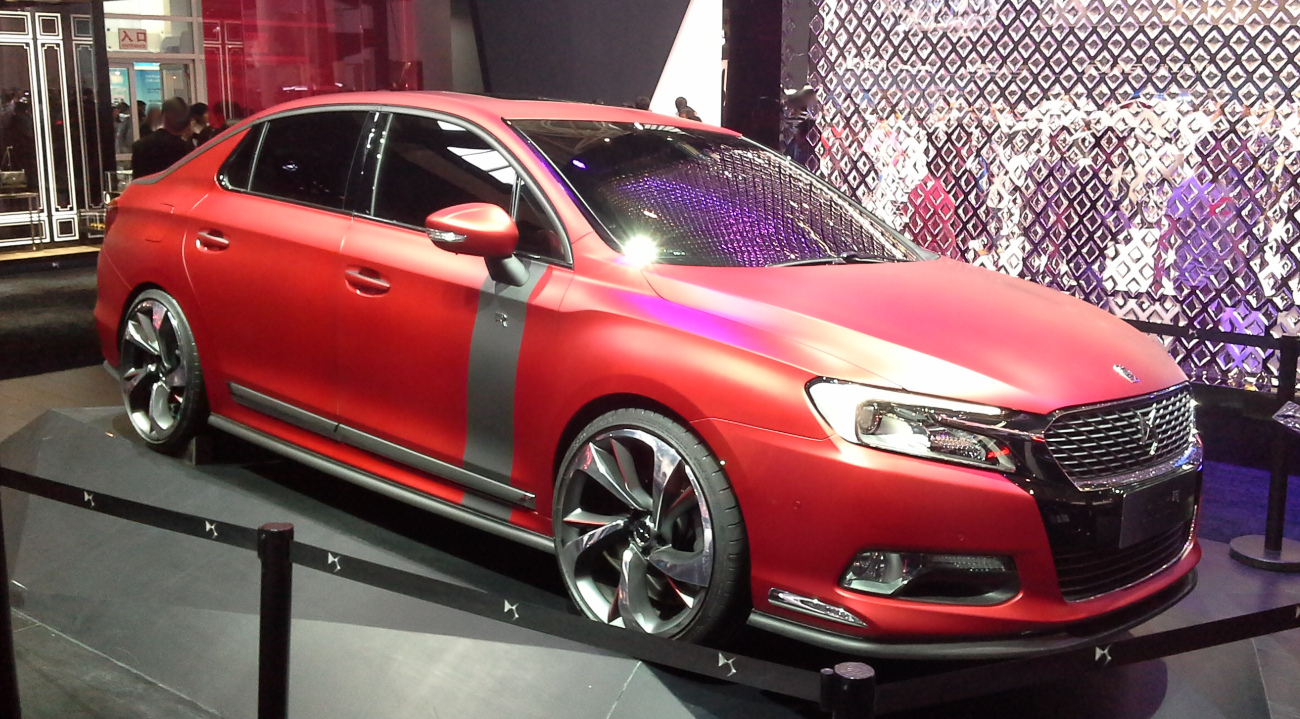
2014 DS 5LS R

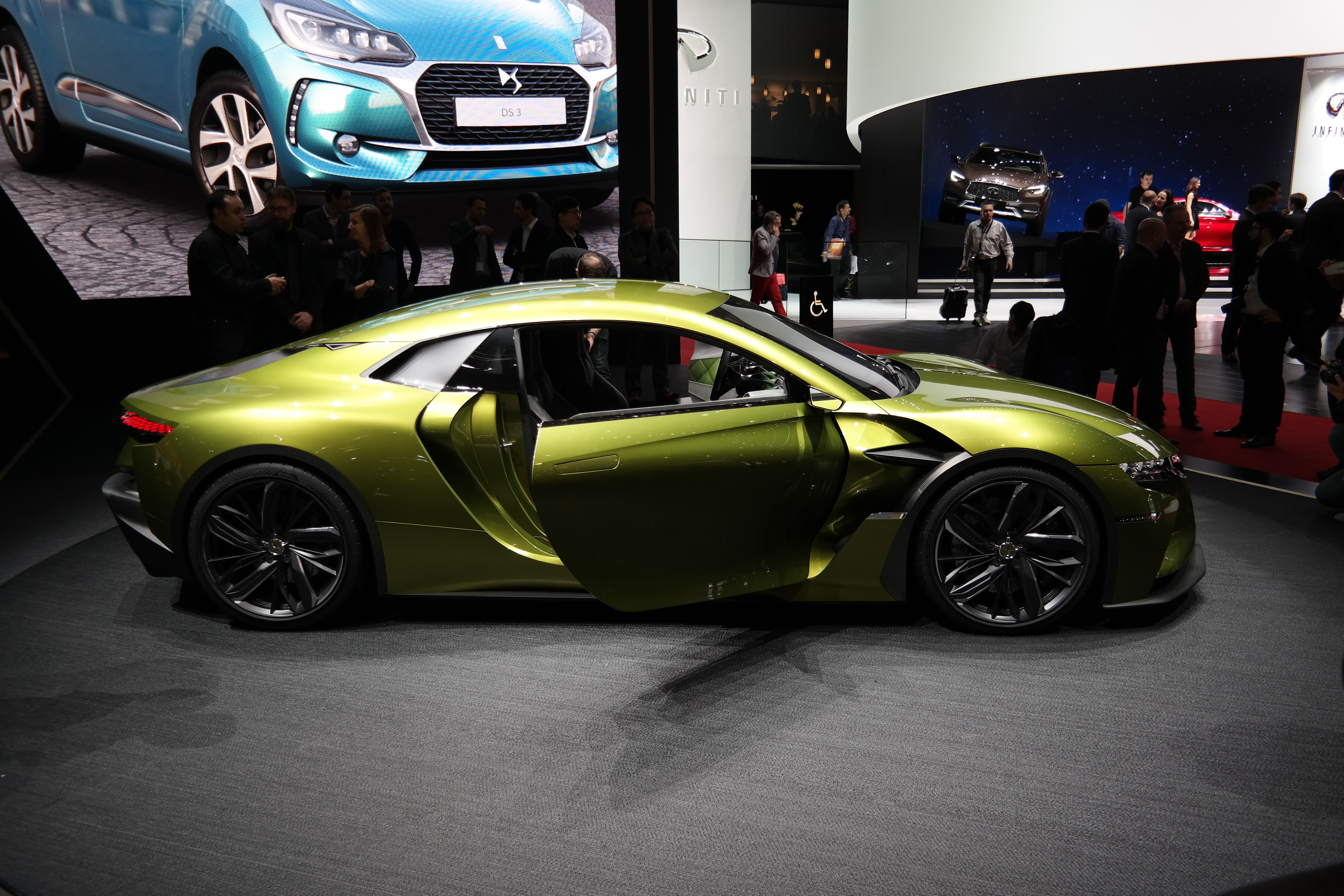
2016 DS E-Tense

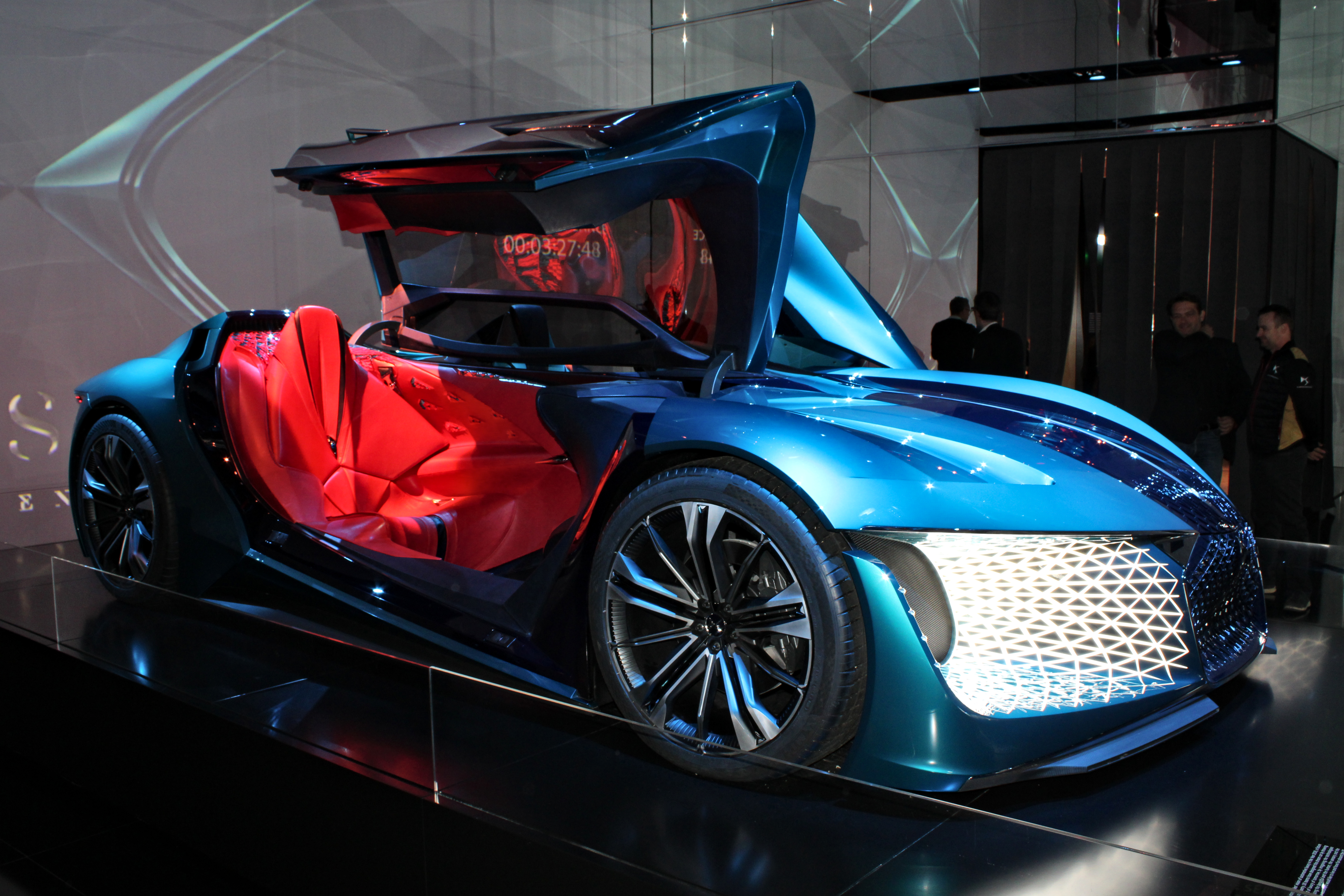
2018 DS X E-Tense

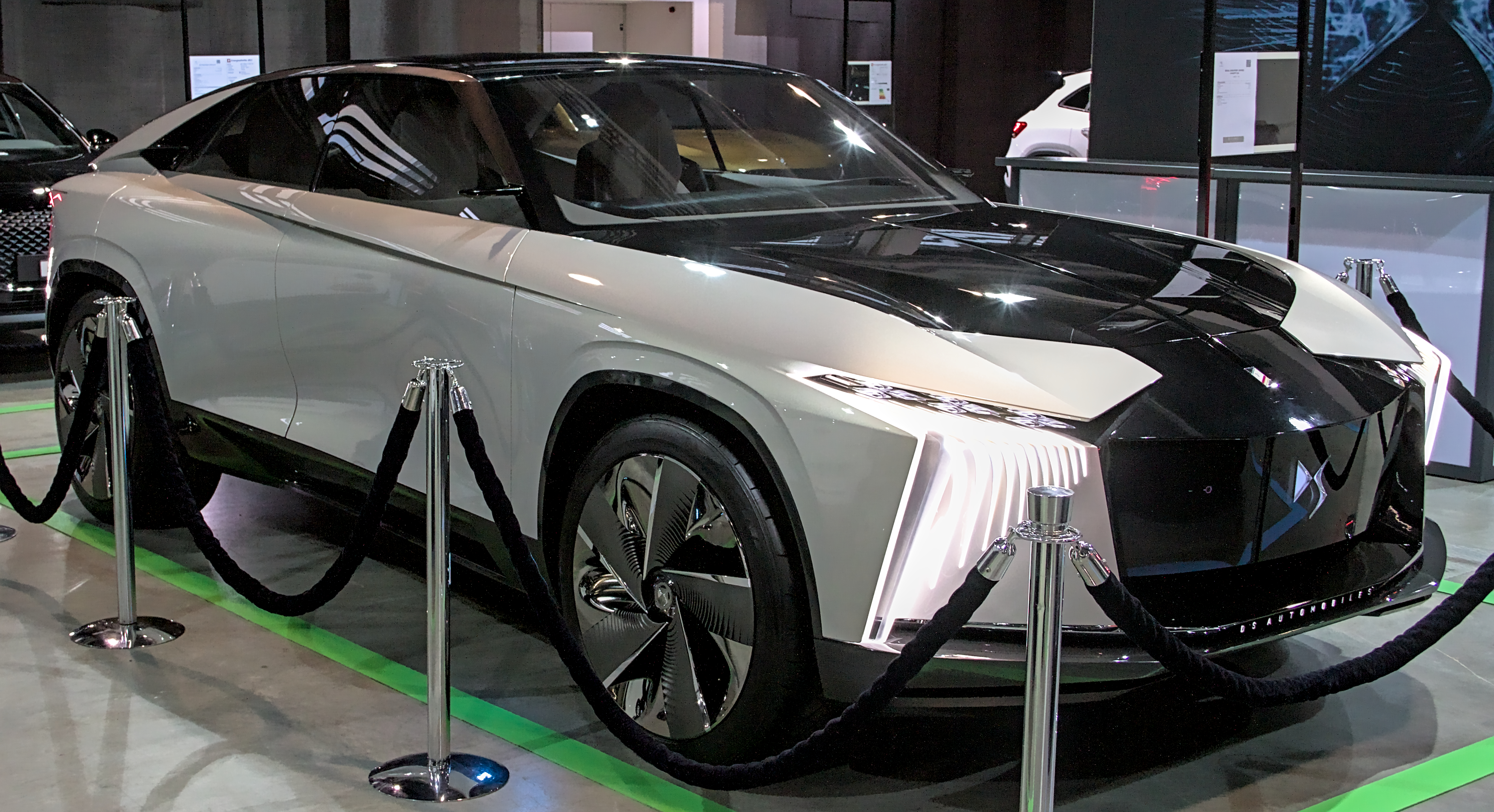
2020 DS Aero Sport Lounge

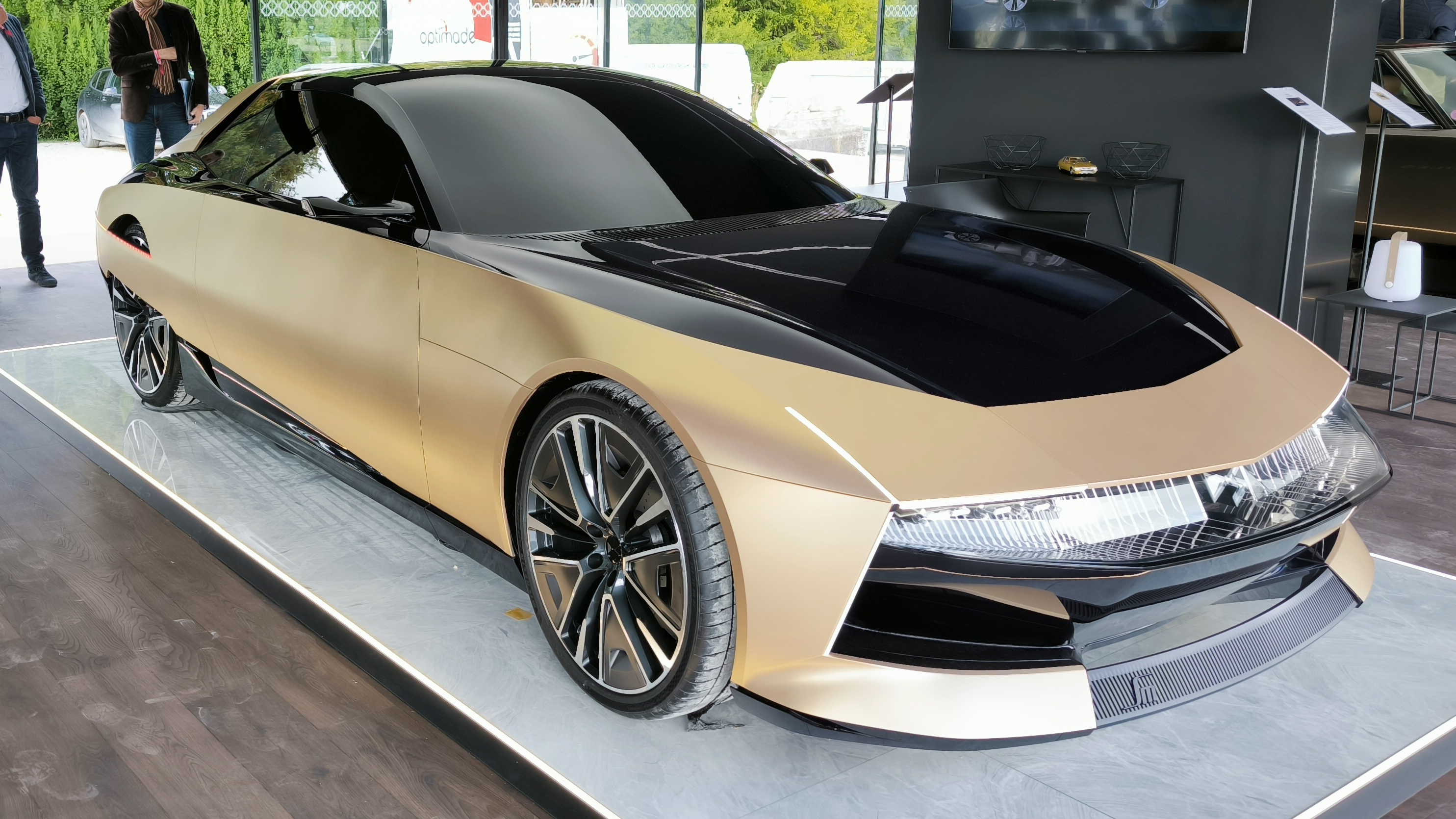
2024 DS SM Tribute

2026 DS F3VER

== Sales ==
Year	Worldwide	Europe	China
2009		205	
2010		53,336	
2011		97,579	
2012	129,000	117,374	
2013	122,694	110,554	1,271
2014	118,472	85,093	26,008
2015	102,335	75,163	21,451
2016	85,981	65,456	16,156
2017	52,860	45,863	5,847
2018	53,265	45,251	3,867
2019		52,597	1,254
2020		43,597	427
2021		43,970	1,853
2022		49,510	1,373
2023		48,444	

== Motorsport ==
DS Performance is the competitions department of DS Automobiles, which it claims was established to accelerate the electrification transition of the brand. Although the department doesn't participate directly in motorsport by using partners instead, it assists with technological development of Formula E cars and related marketing activities.

=== Formula E ===
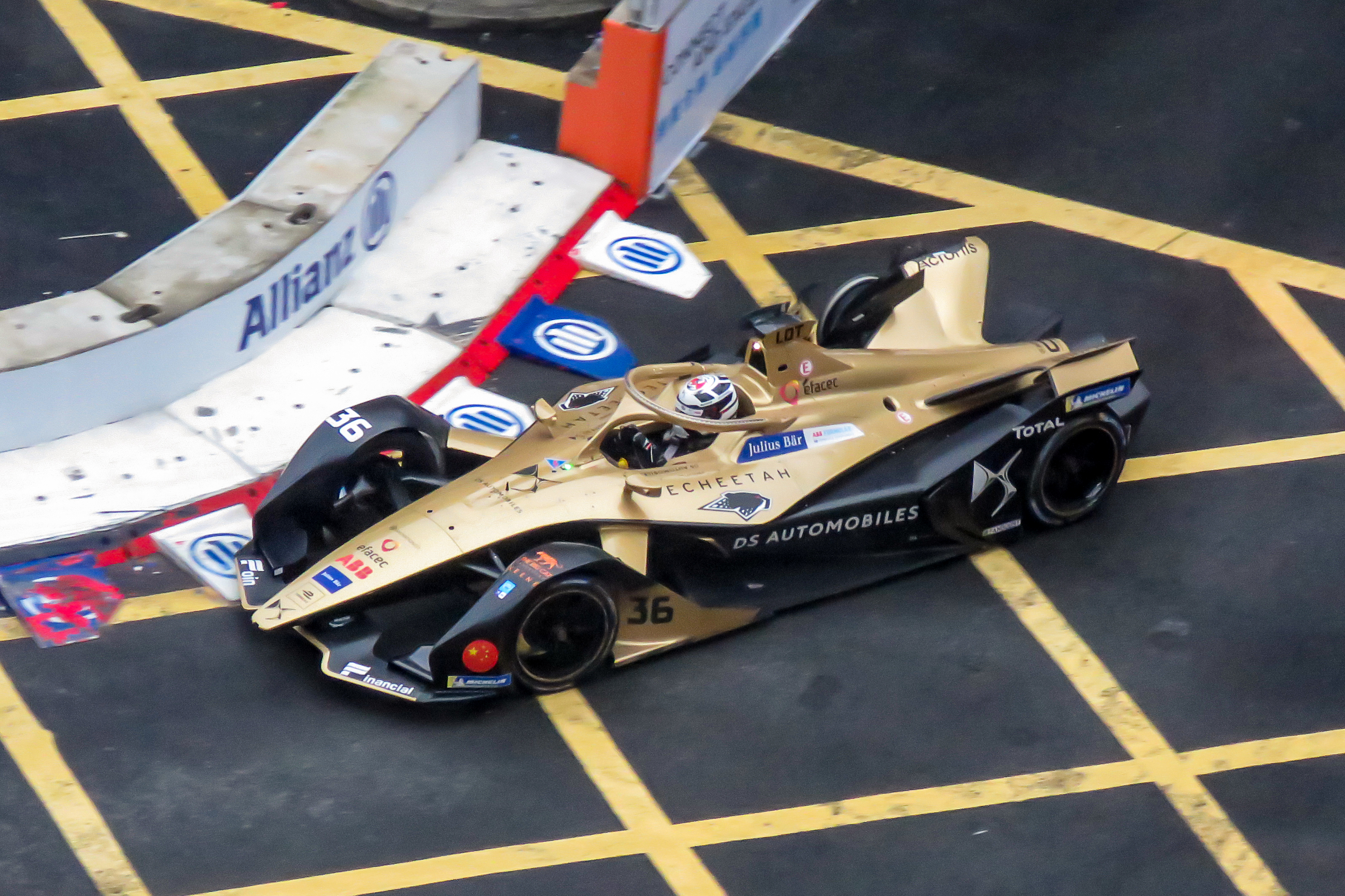
Andre Lotterer driving for DS Techeetah in 2019

DS partnered with Sir Richard Branson's Virgin Racing for the second season of the FIA Formula E Championship. The team competed as DS Virgin Racing, finishing in third place in the season and fourth in the 2016–17 season.

For the 2018–19 season, DS ended its relationship Virgin and moved to partner with Techeetah. The newly renamed DS Techeetah, using the DS E-Tense FE 19 powertrain, won both the drivers and teams championships with Jean-Eric Vergne while becoming Formula E's first two-time drivers champion. This feat was repeated in the following season with António Félix da Costa becoming driver's champion and DS Techeetah winning the teams title for 2019–20.

The partnership with Techeetah ended at after the 2021–22 season. DS then partnered with Penske Autosport to create DS Penske from the 2022–23 season. In March 2026, DS announced that they will exit the series at the end of the 2025–26 season. DS ended their run in Formula E with a race victory in the final race of the season through Taylor Barnard.

==== Results ====
Year	Team	Chassis	Powertrain	Tyres	No.	Drivers	Points	T.C.
2015–16	(United Kingdom) DS Virgin Racing	Spark SRT01-e	Virgin Racing Engineering DSV-01	M	2	(United Kingdom) Sam Bird	144	3rd
2015–16	(United Kingdom) DS Virgin Racing	Spark SRT01-e	Virgin Racing Engineering DSV-01	M	25	(France) Jean-Éric Vergne	144	3rd
2016–17	(United Kingdom) DS Virgin Racing	Spark SRT01-e	DS Virgin DSV-02	M	2	(United Kingdom) Sam Bird	190	4th
2016–17	(United Kingdom) DS Virgin Racing	Spark SRT01-e	DS Virgin DSV-02	M	37	(Argentina) José María López	190	4th
2016–17	(United Kingdom) DS Virgin Racing	Spark SRT01-e	DS Virgin DSV-02	M	37	(United Kingdom) Alex Lynn	190	4th
2017–18	(United Kingdom) DS Virgin Racing	Spark SRT01-e	DS Virgin DSV-03	M	2	(United Kingdom) Sam Bird	160	3rd
2017–18	(United Kingdom) DS Virgin Racing	Spark SRT01-e	DS Virgin DSV-03	M	36	(United Kingdom) Alex Lynn	160	3rd
2018–19	(China) DS Techeetah	Spark SRT05e	DS E-TENSE FE19	M	25	(France) Jean-Éric Vergne	222	1st
2018–19	(China) DS Techeetah	Spark SRT05e	DS E-TENSE FE19	M	36	(Germany) André Lotterer	222	1st
2019–20	(China) DS Techeetah	Spark SRT05e	DS E-TENSE FE20	M	13	(Portugal) António Félix da Costa	244	1st
2019–20	(China) DS Techeetah	Spark SRT05e	DS E-TENSE FE20	M	25	(France) Jean-Éric Vergne	244	1st
2020–21	(China) DS Techeetah	Spark SRT05e	DS E-TENSE FE20; DS E-TENSE FE21	M	13	(Portugal) António Félix da Costa	166	3rd
2020–21	(China) DS Techeetah	Spark SRT05e	DS E-TENSE FE20; DS E-TENSE FE21	M	25	(France) Jean-Éric Vergne	166	3rd
2021–22	(France) DS Techeetah	Spark SRT05e	DS E-TENSE FE21	M	13	(Portugal) António Félix da Costa	266	3rd
2021–22	(France) DS Techeetah	Spark SRT05e	DS E-TENSE FE21	M	25	(France) Jean-Éric Vergne	266	3rd
2022–23	(United States) DS Penske	Formula E Gen3	DS E-TENSE FE23	H	1	(Belgium) Stoffel Vandoorne	163	5th
2022–23	(United States) DS Penske	Formula E Gen3	DS E-TENSE FE23	H	25	(France) Jean-Éric Vergne	163	5th
2023–24	(United States) DS Penske	Formula E Gen3	DS E-TENSE FE23	H	2	(Belgium) Stoffel Vandoorne	200	3rd
2023–24	(United States) DS Penske	Formula E Gen3	DS E-TENSE FE23	H	25	(France) Jean-Éric Vergne	200	3rd
2024–25	(United States) DS Penske	Formula E Gen3 Evo	DS E-TENSE FE25	H	7	(Germany) Maximilian Günther	184	5th
2024–25	(United States) DS Penske	Formula E Gen3 Evo	DS E-TENSE FE25	H	25	(France) Jean-Éric Vergne	184	5th
2025–26	(United States) DS Penske	Formula E Gen3 Evo	DS E-TENSE FE25	H	7	(Germany) Maximilian Günther	91	9th
2025–26	(United States) DS Penske	Formula E Gen3 Evo	DS E-TENSE FE25	H	77	(United Kingdom) Taylor Barnard	91	9th

== See also ==
- DS Vehicles
