= Stellantis Japan =

Company in Tokyo, Japan

Stellantis Japan Ltd.
- Company type: Subsidiary
- Industry: Automotive
- Founded: July 1, 2012; 13 years ago
- Headquarters: Minato, Tokyo, Japan
- Products: Automobiles
- Brands: Abarth; Alfa Romeo; Citroën; DS; Fiat; Jeep; Peugeot
- Parent: Stellantis

Stellantis Japan Ltd. is the Japanese subsidiary of Stellantis. Its headquarters are located in Minato, Tokyo.

FCA Japan Co., Ltd., the Japanese subsidiary of Fiat Chrysler Automobiles (FCA), was established through an absorption-type merger of Groupe PSA Japan Co., Ltd., the Japanese subsidiary of Groupe PSA, which merged with Fiat on January 16, 2021, and Fiat Group Automobiles Japan Co., Ltd., the Japanese subsidiary of Fiat before its merger with FCA, on March 1, 2022 (Groupe PSA Japan) and March 2, 2022 (Fiat Group Automobiles Japan).

== History ==
On July 1, 2012, Fiat Group Automobiles Japan, the Japanese subsidiary of Fiat, merged with Chrysler Japan, a subsidiary of Mercedes-Benz Japan, the Japanese subsidiary of Daimler, Chrysler's former partner, to form Fiat Chrysler Japan (FCJ). However, at this stage, FCJ was merely a collective name for both Fiat Group Automobiles Japan and Chrysler Japan, and was not a trade name for the company. "Fiat Chrysler Japan" was established, and the previous "Fiat Group Automobiles Japan" and "Chrysler Japan Co., Ltd." were placed under its umbrella, but on January 1, 2015, the two legal entities of Fiat and Chrysler were merged and the company name was changed to "FCA Japan Co., Ltd.".

In Japan, there were two companies: FCA Japan (formerly Chrysler Japan), which handles the Fiat, Abarth, Alfa Romeo, and Jeep brands, and Groupe PSA Japan, which handles the Peugeot, Citroën, DS Automobiles, and Opel brands. In January 2022, it was announced that the two companies would merge and unify their Japanese subsidiaries, and that the company name would be "Stellantis Japan".

On March 1 of the same year, Groupe PSA Japan merged with FCA Japan, and on the 3rd of the same month, the company name was changed to "Stellantis Japan Co., Ltd.", and Stellantis' management in Japan was fully integrated. The head office functions will be located at the former FCA Japan. The Maserati brand continue to operate independently as "Maserati Japan".

On November 25, 2022, the position of representative director and president was changed from Pontus Hegstrom, who held the position for 14 years from FCA Japan until the launch of Stellantis Japan, to Susumu Uchikoshi, who had served as Director of American Brands for Stellantis India Asia Pacific Region.

== Brands ==
The active brand portfolio of Stellantis Japan as of 2024 is shown below. This list does not contain any discontinued brands owned by the company which has been placed into dormancy either directly or by its predecessor organisations.

Brand	Origin	Established
Abarth	Italy	1949
Alfa Romeo	Italy	1910
Citroën	France	1919
DS Automobiles	France	2014
Fiat	Italy	1899
Jeep	United States	1943
Peugeot	France	1810
