= DS Aero Sport Lounge =

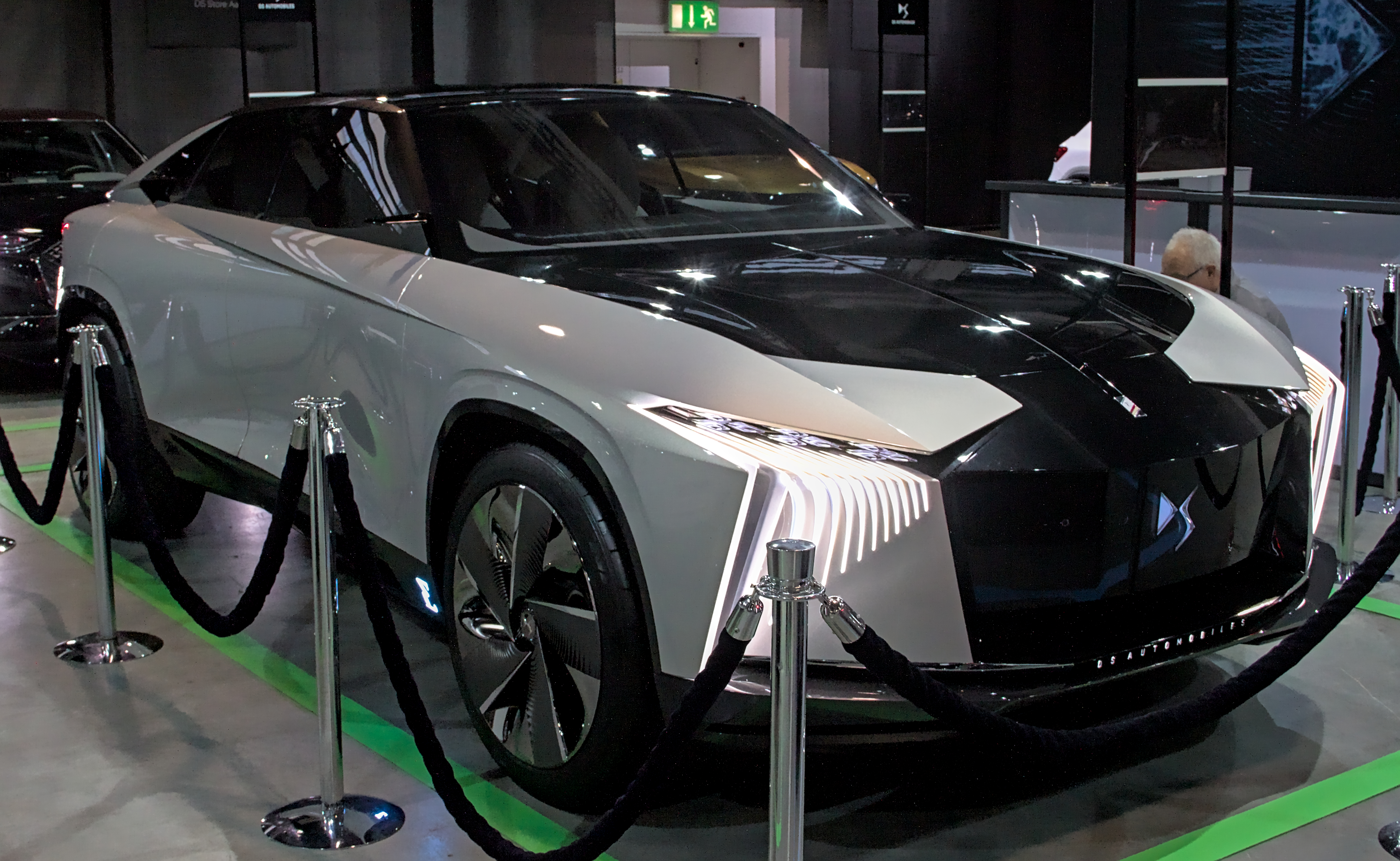

Overview
- Manufacturer: DS Automobiles
- Production: 2020

Body and chassis
- Class: Concept Car
- Body style: 5-door SUV
- Layout: Single Electric motor, Unknown layout

Chronology
- Successor: DS N°8

The DS Aero Sport Lounge is a Concept SUV made by DS Automobiles. Its design later inspired the design of later DS models, including the DS E-TENSE Performance concept in 2022.

The Aero Sport Lounge was to make its debut at the 2020 Geneva International Motor Show, but due to the show's cancellation the concept never debuted and was subsequently never produced.

== Powertrain ==
The Aero Sport Lounge is powered by a single electric motor producing 680PS (671bhp) and can reach 0–60 in 2.8 seconds as claimed by DS Automobiles.

== Design ==
The Aero Sport Lounge has a silver and black two-tone paint job, with a black panel at the front with the DS Automobiles logo placed on it. The front black panel can also display information when needed. The car has 23 inch wheels.

== Interior ==
The Aero Sport Lounge does not have traditional displays, but the Navigation system is projected near the driver and passenger. DS Automobiles' IRIS navigation system was to power the navigation system. The lower part of the dashboard is dressed in cotton satin. It is used to project information from the upper blade.
