= Citroën Survolt =

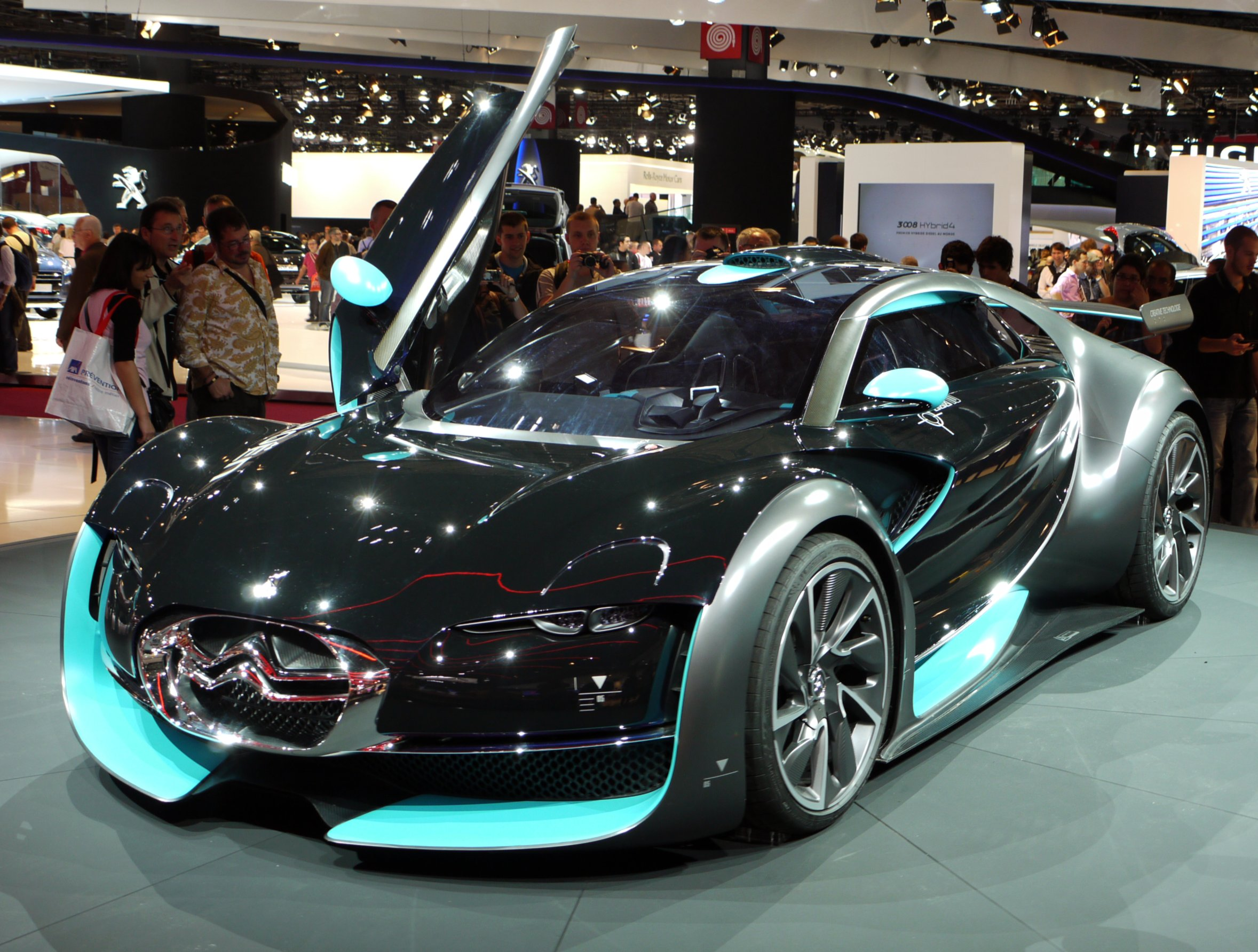

Overview
- Manufacturer: Citroën
- Also called: DS Survolt
- Designer: Frédéric Soubirou (exterior); Julien Famchon (interior)

Body and chassis
- Class: Racing car
- Body style: 2-door coupe
- Layout: Rear mid-engine, rear-wheel-drive layout
- Doors: Scissor
- Related: Citroën Revolte

Powertrain
- Engine: 2x electric motors, 300 bhp (224 kW) combined

The Citroën Survolt (later known as the DS Survolt) is a concept electric racing car produced by Citroën and presented at the 2010 Geneva Motor Show.

== Overview ==
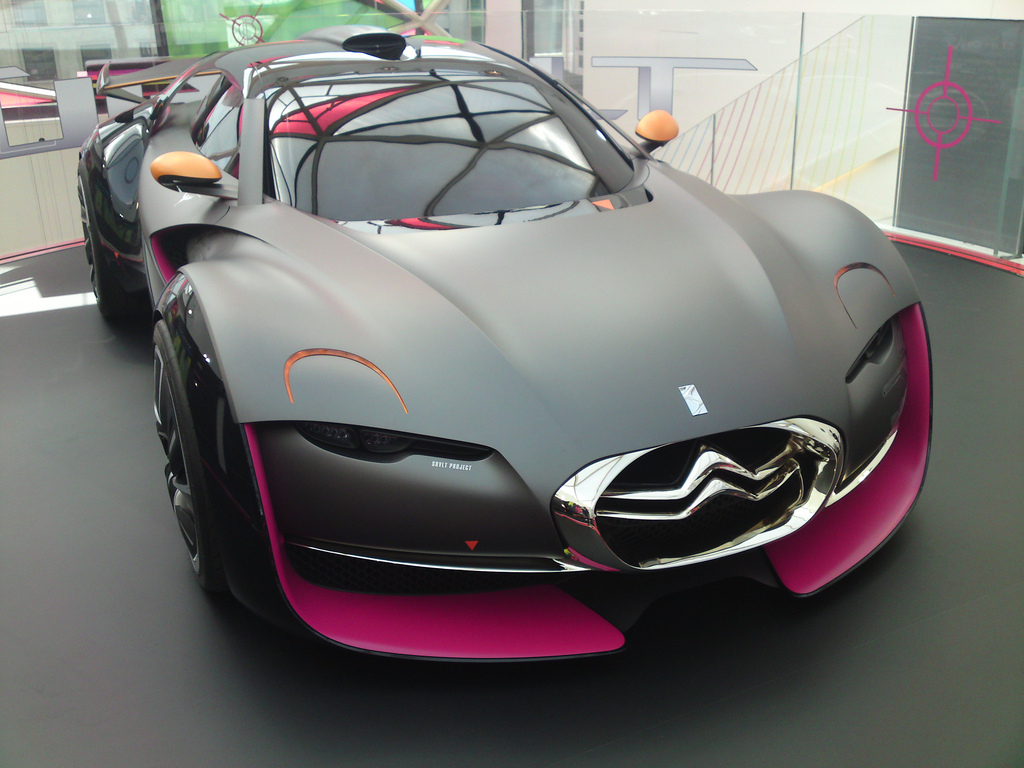
Original colour scheme

The Survolt is a full-sized racing car based on the earlier electric concept car Citroën Revolte presented at the 2009 Frankfurt Motor Show. Because the car runs on batteries, it is classed as a zero-emissions vehicle.

== Design ==
The Survolt is 3.85 meters (12.6 feet) long, 1.87 meters (6.1 feet) wide and 1.20 meters (3.9 feet) high and features a design with the front dominated by the vehicle's badge located above the large oval-shaped grille.

The car has horizontal LED headlamps which have lower power consumption than traditional filament bulbs — important in a battery-operated vehicle.

At the back, the Survolt maintains the light cluster design used on the REVOLTe, and has a spoiler to increase rear downforce.

An art car based on the Survolt has been designed with the collaboration of Françoise Nielly in 2011.

== Engine and drivetrain ==
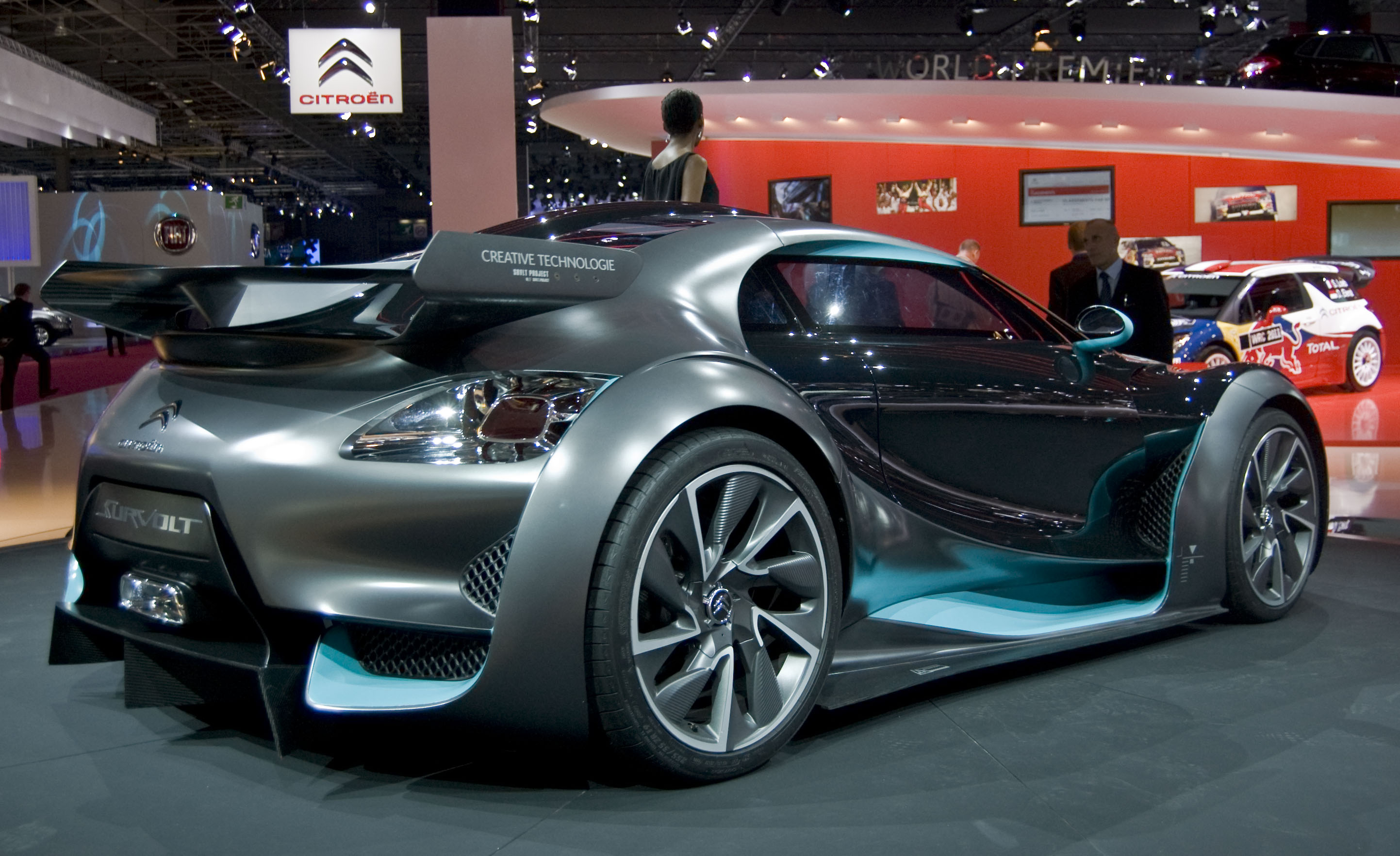
Rear end

The Survolt is powered by a pair of electric motors with a combined power output of 300 bhp (224 kW). Citroën claims its top speed is 260 km/h (162 mph), and that it can accelerate from 0–100 km/h (62 mph) in less than 5 seconds. They also claim that the batteries provide a range of 200 km (124 mi).

== Motorsports ==
The DS Survolt made its first appearance on a racetrack at Le Mans on 12 July 2010. Vanina Ickx was the first driver to get behind the wheel of the Survolt.

Although it has not been confirmed that the Survolt will ever be produced, there are rumors that Citroën wants to create a limited-production of a compact-sized concept based on this car, and start a one-make racing series.

== Media appearances ==
The DS Survolt initially made an appearance in Asphalt 6: Adrenaline (as the Citroën Survolt), Asphalt 8: Airborne and GT Racing 2: The Real Car Experience, all of which are mobile racing games by Gameloft. They would later return it into Asphalt Legends in the Legacy Of Speed season, named the Citroën DS Survolt in-game. Outside of those, it's also available on Driveclub for PlayStation 4 as a free downloadable content.

The British automobile test-driving show Top Gear has driven the car around their test track. The hosts gave it high marks, but noted physical challenges entering and exiting the vehicle.
