= DS F3VER =

Overview
- Manufacturer: DS Automobiles

Body and chassis
- Class: Concept car
- Body style: 5-door hatchback
- Platform: STLA One

Dimensions
- Wheelbase: 2,700 mm (106.3 in)
- Length: 4,190 mm (165.0 in)
- Width: 1,840 mm (72.4 in)
- Height: 1,460 mm (57.5 in)

The DS F3VER is a concept car developed by DS Automobiles. It is a small hatchback and was presented on 12 October 2026 at the 2026 Paris Motor Show.

== Overview ==
The F3VER serves as a design study that previews an evolved design language for the brand. It is a small 5-door hatchback sized similarly to the discontinued DS 3, with a length of 4,190 mm (165 in). Multiple sources have regarded it as a spiritual successor to that model, while possibly previewing an upcoming entry model to the DS lineup.

=== Design ===
The F3VER uses a new design language with certain elements inspired by the first generation DS 3, including the similarly shaped taillights with 3000 LEDs built-in, a shark fin motif around the rear windows, with rear door handles mounted subtly on the C-pillar to resemble a 3-door body like the original model. It features gold contrast roof and a gradient body color that appears blue and purple under different lighting conditions. At the front, it is the first DS model to feature no grille or grille-like feature; complemented by Y-shaped headlights with vertically oriented daytime running lights. Furthermore, a vertically oriented LCD display named the "totem" is featured on the front and rear bumpers.

It has a stated trunk capacity of 400 L (14 cu ft).

=== Specifications ===
The F3VER rides on the Stellantis group's upcoming modular STLA One platform. In this application, it will feature a battery electric powertrain consisting of a single front-mounted electric motor. DS aims to achieve of 310 mi (500 km) WLTP range.
