= Citroën Revolte =

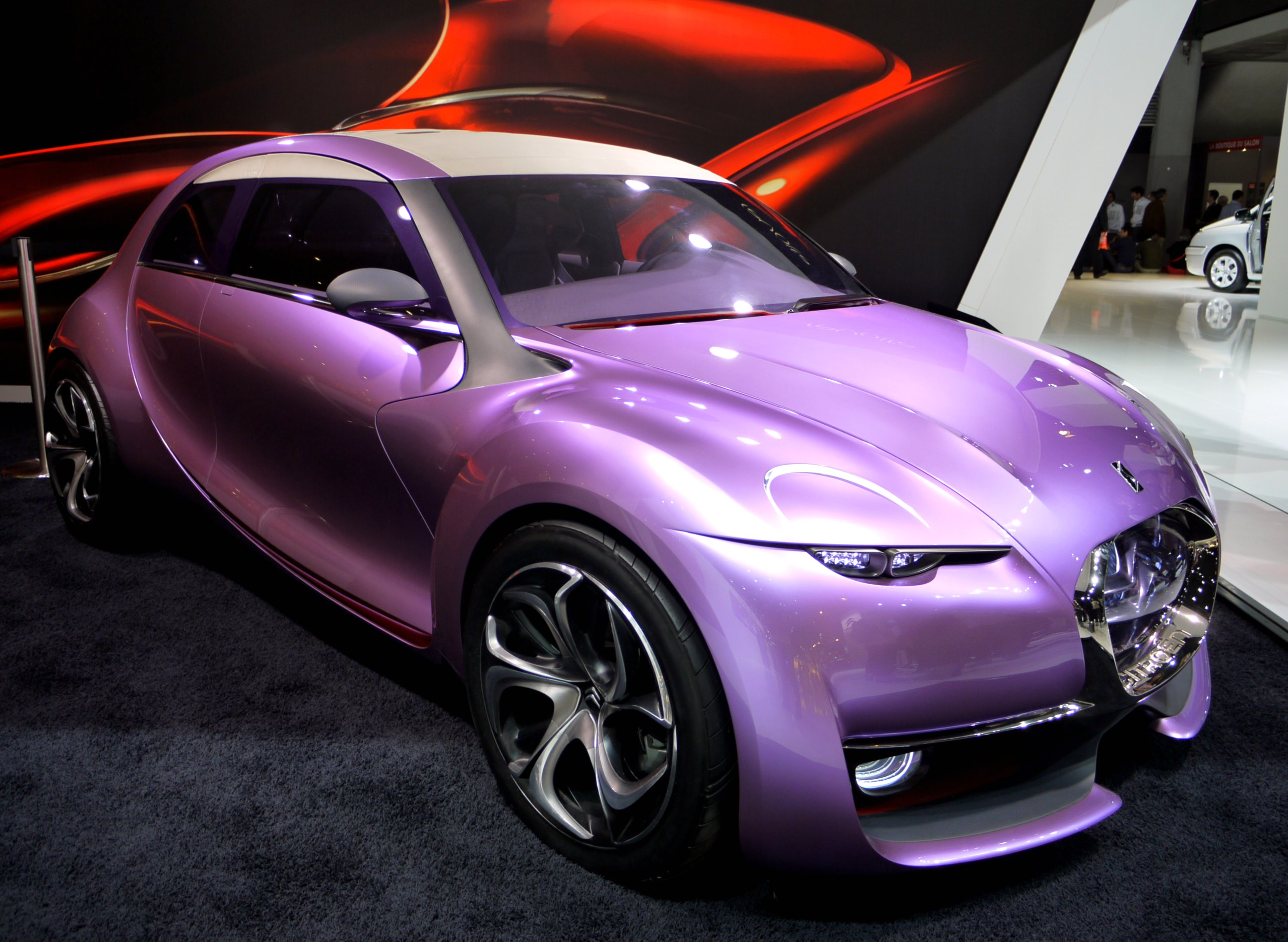

Overview
- Manufacturer: Citroën
- Production: 2009 (Concept car)
- Designer: Frédéric Soubirou (exterior)

Body and chassis
- Class: Supermini (B)
- Body style: 5-door hatchback
- Layout: FF layout
- Related: Citroën Survolt

Powertrain
- Engine: Electric hybrid, 323 hp

Dimensions
- Length: 3.68 m (12 ft 1 in)
- Width: 1.73 m (5 ft 8 in)
- Height: 1.35 m (4 ft 5 in)

Chronology
- Successor: DS 3 DS 4S

The Citroën Revolte is a hybrid concept supermini that was presented and produced by Citroën at the 2009 Frankfurt Motor Show.

== Overview ==
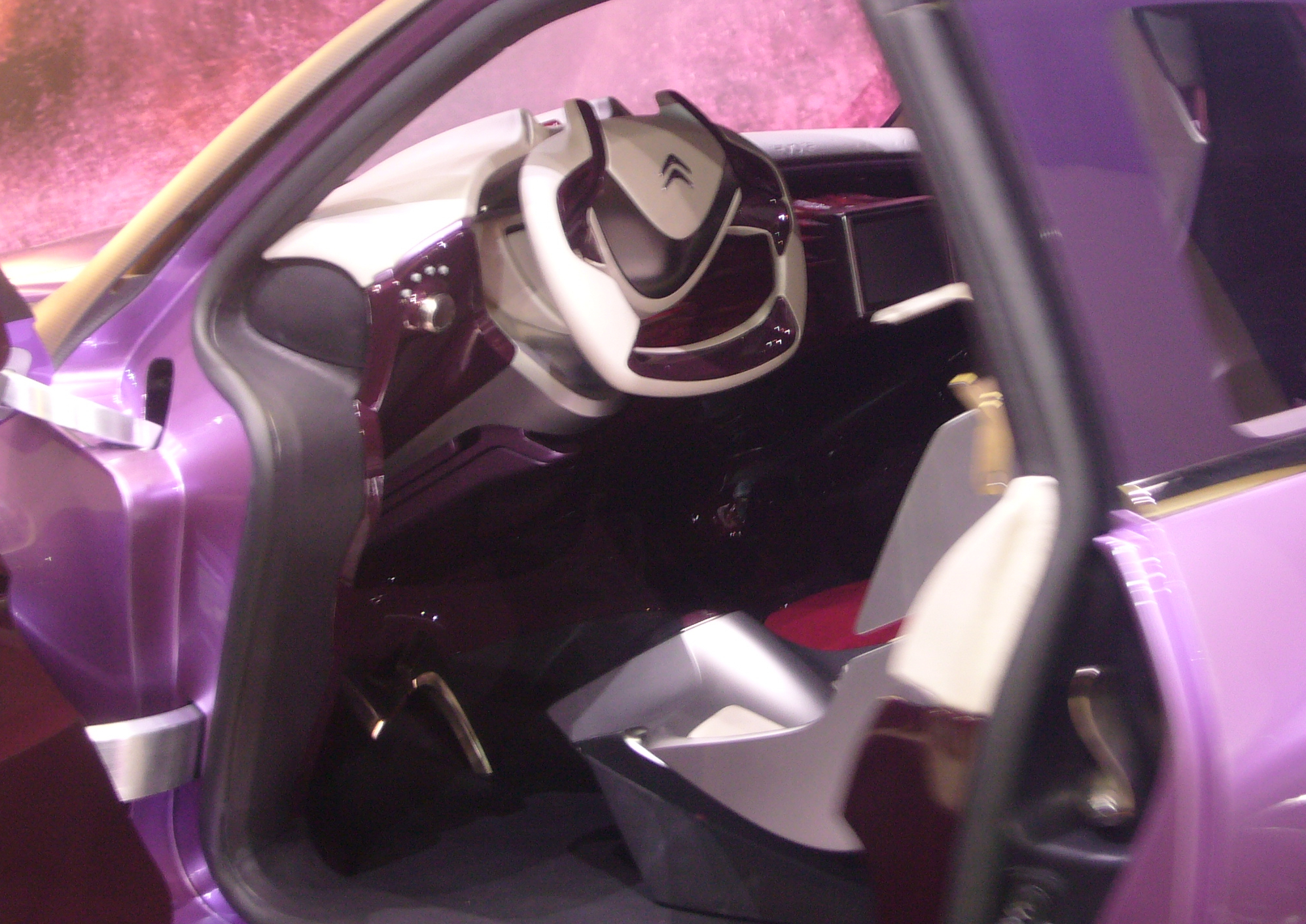
Interior

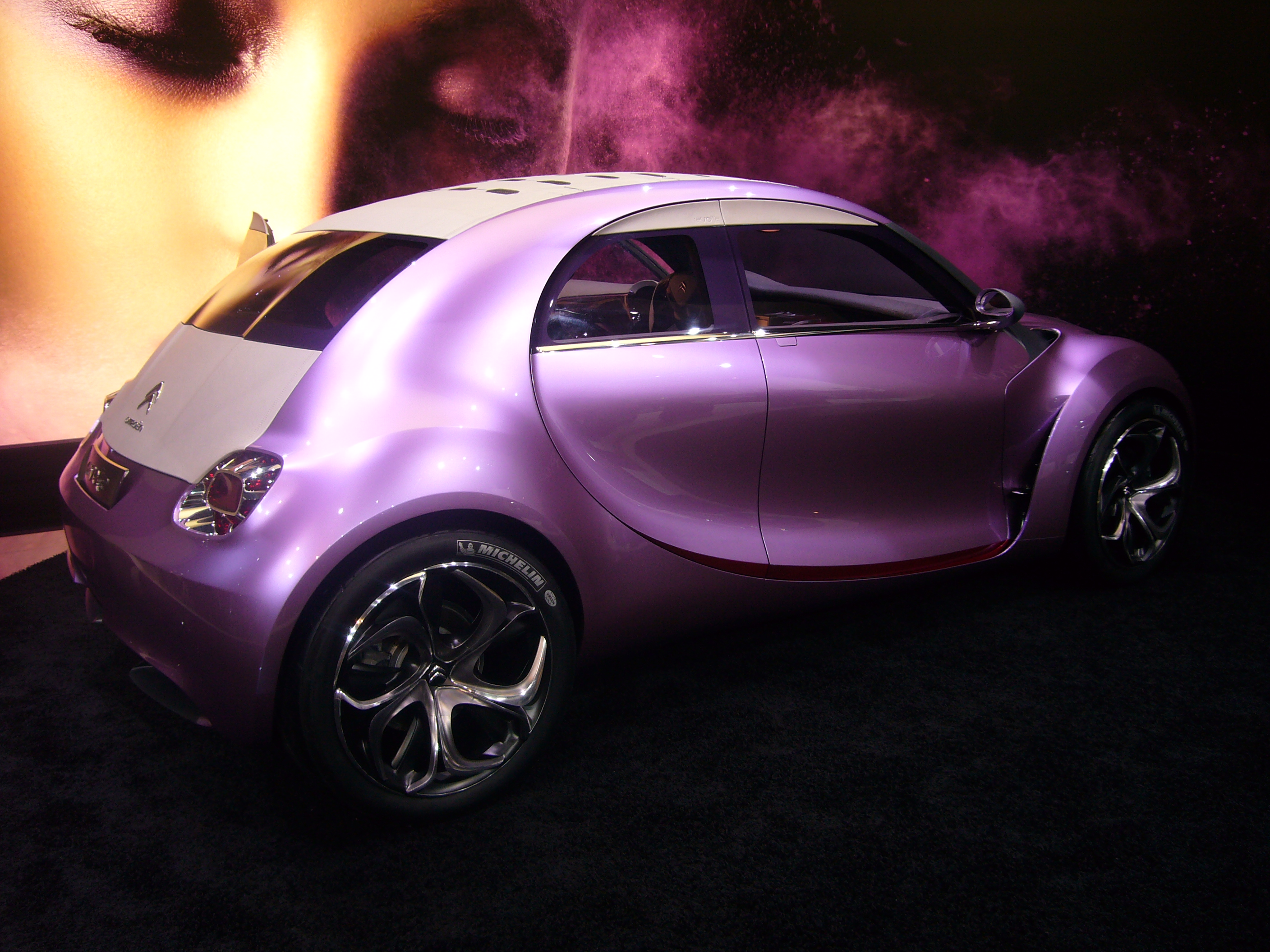
Rear view

The design of the Revolte is based on the historical Citroën 2CV. The concept car shows the changes that have been happening in terms of the role superminis and that style and elegance have become as important as economy and practicality. The Citroën Revolte is related to the Citroën Survolt.

The Revolte concept features Citroën's bold design, which has become part of its history bringing a new contemporary approach to its superminis. The Revolte is 3.68m long, 1.73m wide and 1.35m tall. With well defined wheel arches, curving bonnet, forceful lines and sculpted sides, matching the roof line, the Revolte has a sleek and elegant profile, similar to that of the Citroën Survolt, a concept hybrid supercar developed in 2010 by Citroën. The concept car was fully manufactured in the workshops of Estech France.

== Engine and drivetrain ==
The concept car is powered by both a rechargeable electric engine and a small-capacity internal combustion engine. The Revolte is able to deliver zero-emission driving thanks to its all-electric ZEV (Zero Emission Vehicle) mode. The combined engines make 323 hp (241 kW), 142 lb⋅ft (193 N⋅m) of torque, allowing for a top speed of 140 mph (225 km/h) and 0–60 mph (0–97 km/h) in five seconds.
