= Citroën Hypnos =

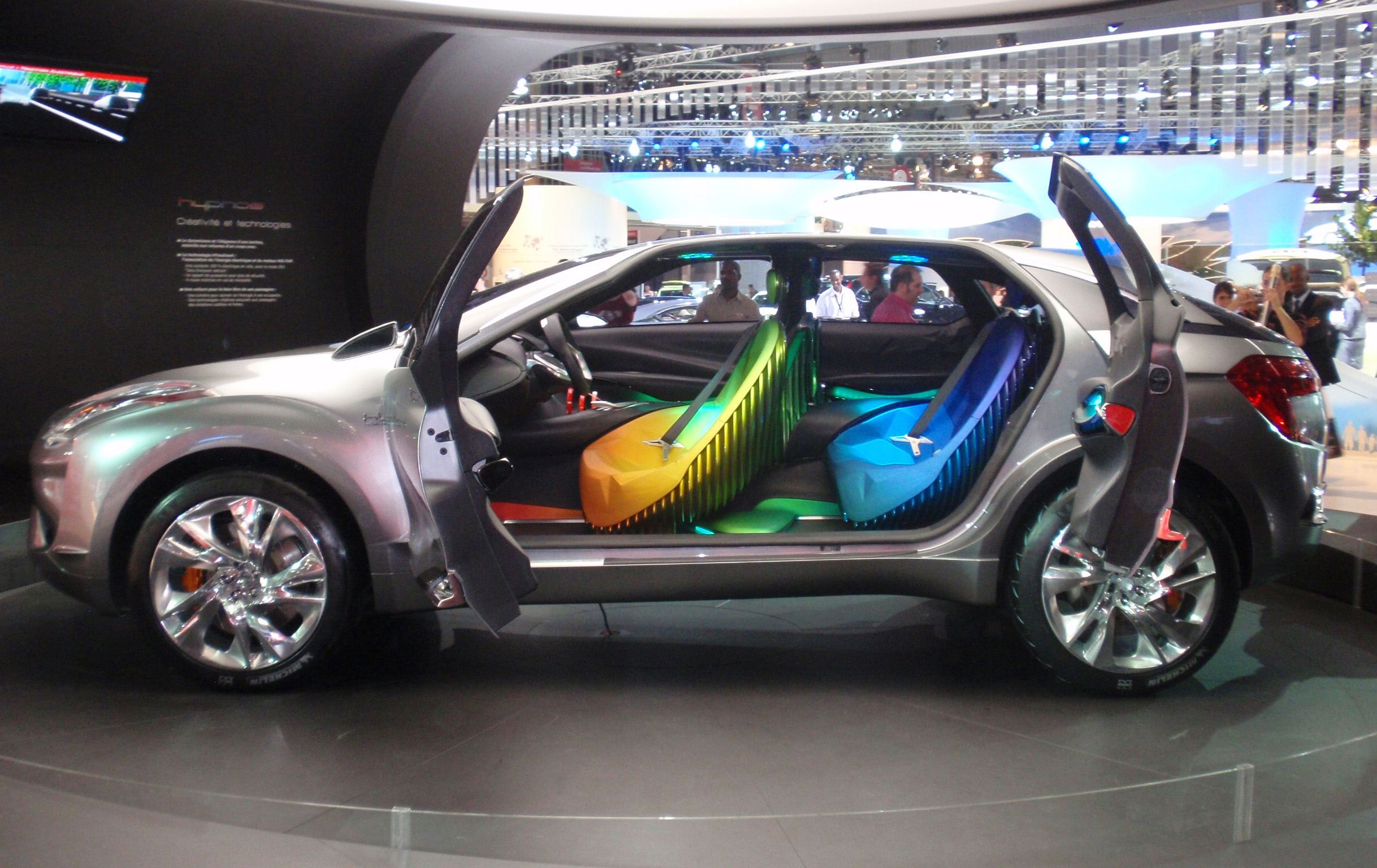

Overview
- Manufacturer: Citroën
- Production: 2008 (Concept car)
- Designer: Emmanuel Rius, Domagoj Đukec (exterior); Leighanne Earley (interior)

Body and chassis
- Class: Mid-size luxury crossover SUV
- Body style: 5-door SUV
- Related: Peugeot RC Hymotion4

Powertrain
- Engine: Diesel engine and electric motor hybrid drivetrain

Dimensions
- Length: 4900 mm
- Width: 2170 mm
- Height: 1580 mm

The Citroën Hypnos is a concept mid-size luxury crossover produced by Citroën at the 2008 Paris Motor Show. It has a 5-door SUV body style and is powered by a diesel hybrid drivetrain with a rear axle-mounted electric motor. The car's most distinctive design feature is its interior, with rainbow-coloured, offset seats, and a system which analyzes the driver's face to gauge his state of mind and adjust the cabin lighting and scented air freshener fragrance in consequence.

Citroën announced that diesel-hybrid engine would be available in all models by 2015.

The concept car has appeared in several auto shows, including the 2011 Goodwood Festival of Speed.

Some of the styling features of this car later appeared in the Mitsubishi ASX-based Citroën C4 Aircross compact SUV, available from the first half of 2012, as well as the Citroën DS4 and DS5.

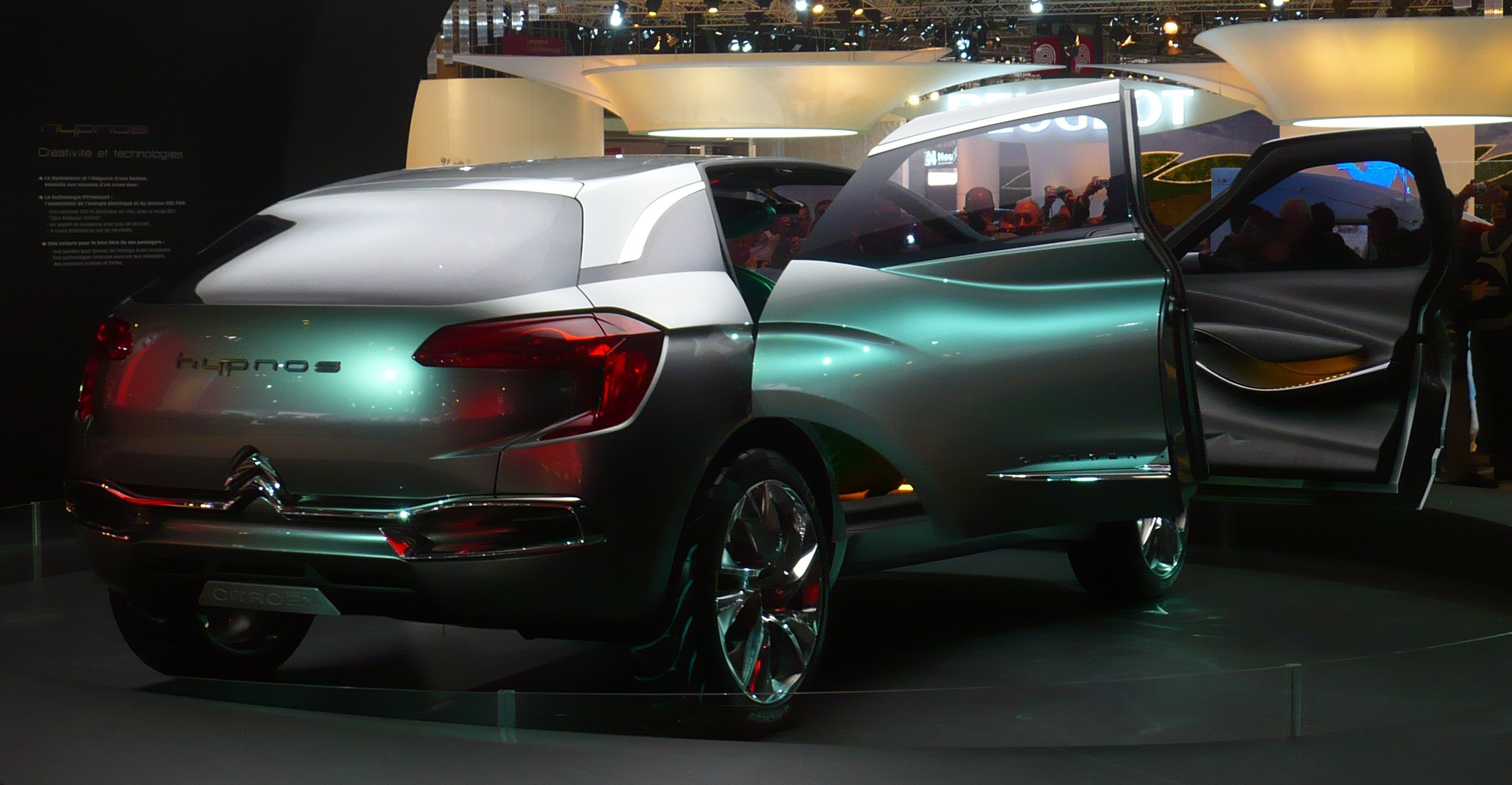

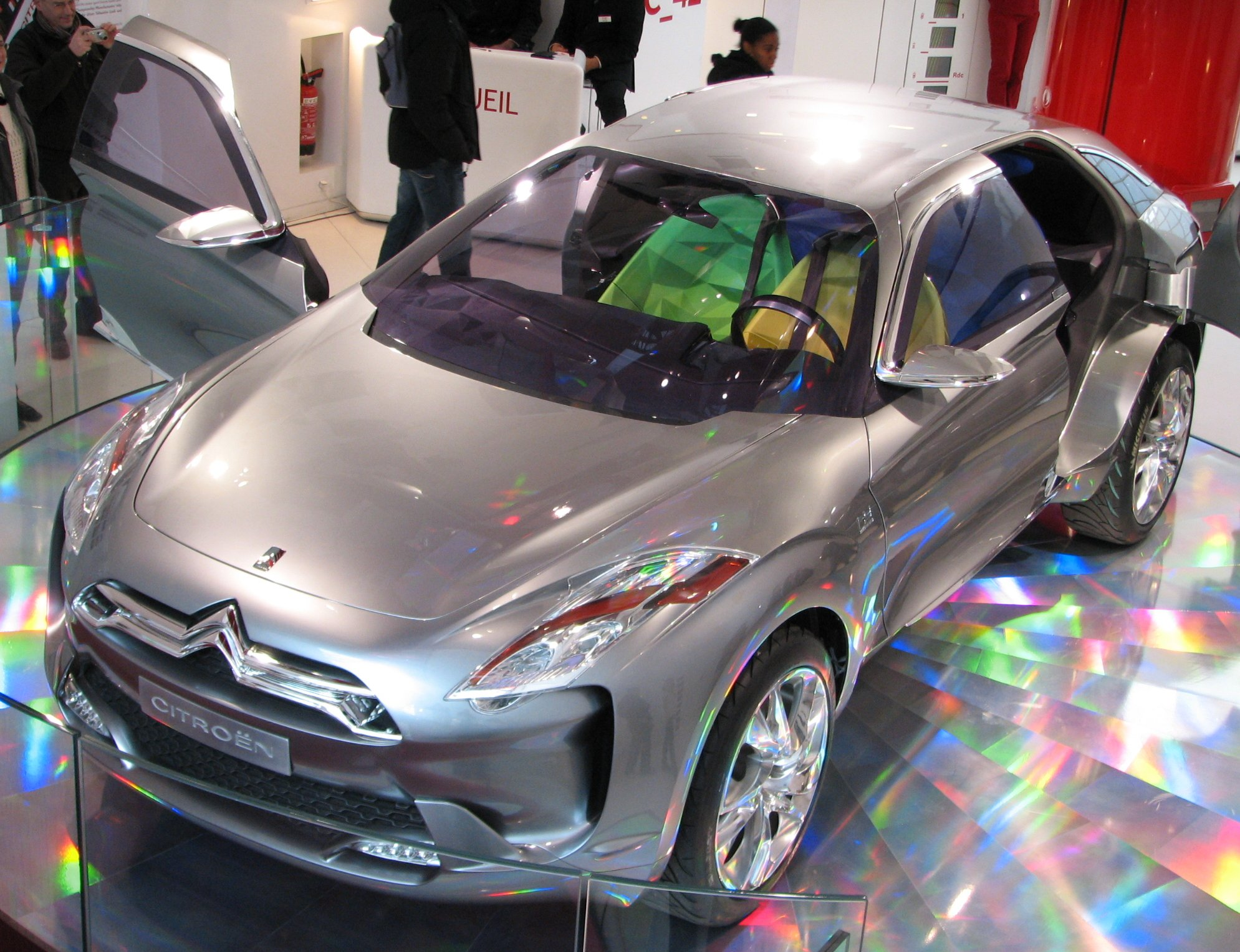
