= Citroën Aircross =

Citroën Aircross may refer to:

- Citroën Aircross, a crossover-styled MPV based on the C3 Picasso, later renamed Citroën C3 Aircross
- Citroën C3 Aircross, a standalone subcompact SUV
- Citroën C4 Aircross, a compact SUV based on the Mitsubishi ASX and the Peugeot 4008
- Citroën C5 Aircross, a standalone compact SUV
