= Citroën C3 Aircross =

Subcompact crossover SUV

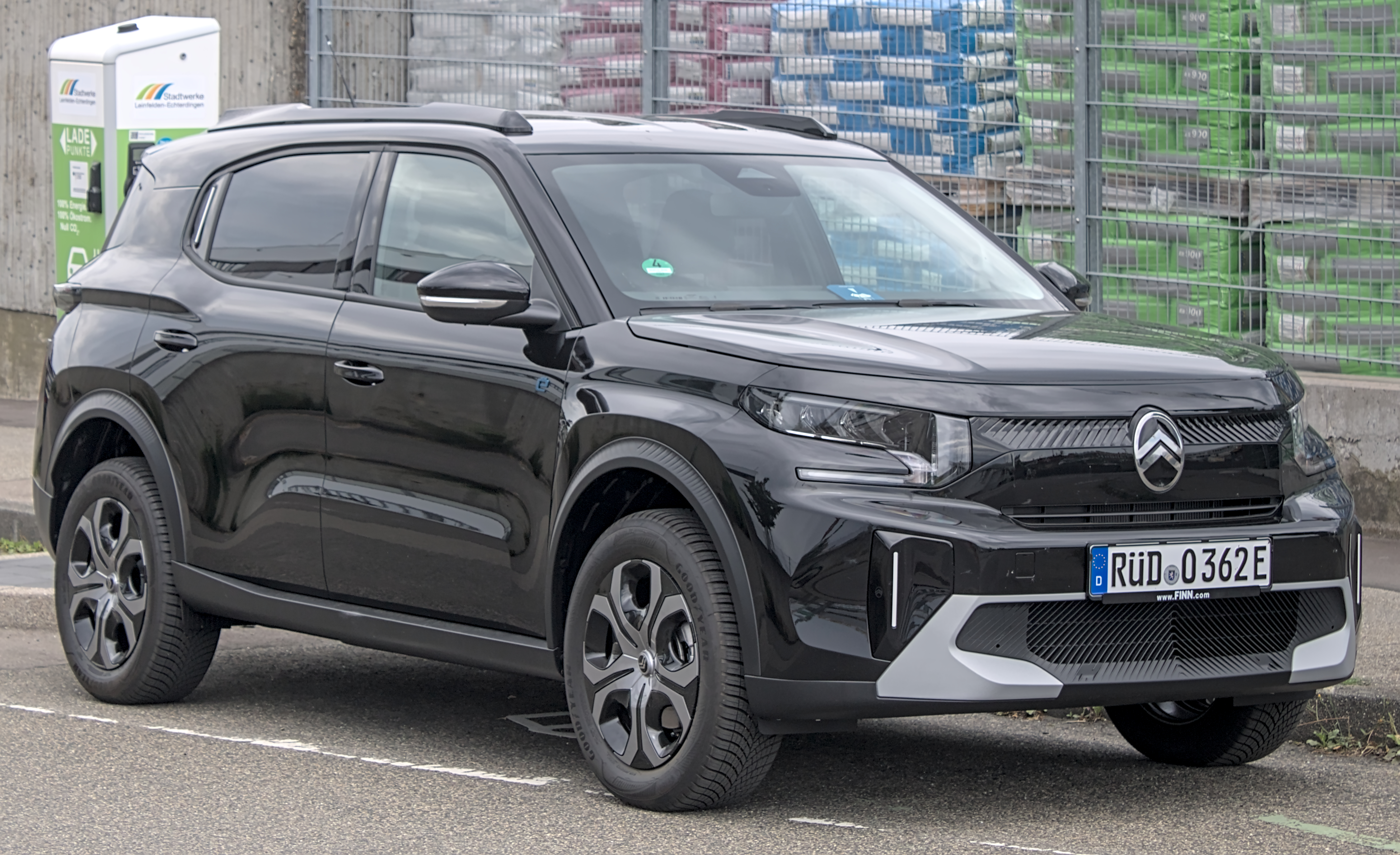
- Citroën ë-C3 Aircross (Germany)

Overview
- Manufacturer: Citroën (Note: PSA Group (2010–2021); Stellantis (2021–present))
- Also called: Citroën Aircross (Latin America, 2016–2020); Citroën C4 Aircross (standalone model, China)
- Production: 2010–2020 (Latin America); 2017–present (Europe)

Body and chassis
- Class: Subcompact SUV (B-segment)
- Body style: 5-door crossover SUV
- Layout: Front-engine, front-wheel-drive

The Citroën C3 Aircross is a nameplate designated to several vehicles produced under the Citroën marque, by the French automaker PSA Group, and later Stellantis.

The first vehicle using the nameplate was the Brazilian version of the C3 Picasso MPV, decorated to mimic an SUV exterior design, which was produced between 2010 and 2020. It was renamed to the Citroën Aircross in 2016.

In 2017, the second vehicle using this nameplate was released in Europe, It is an urban SUV that replaced the C3 Picasso. In 2023, the nameplate was also used for a larger SUV for emerging markets such as India and South America with optional third row seating.

== C3 Picasso-based model (AI58; 2010) ==
C3 Picasso-based model (Latin America)
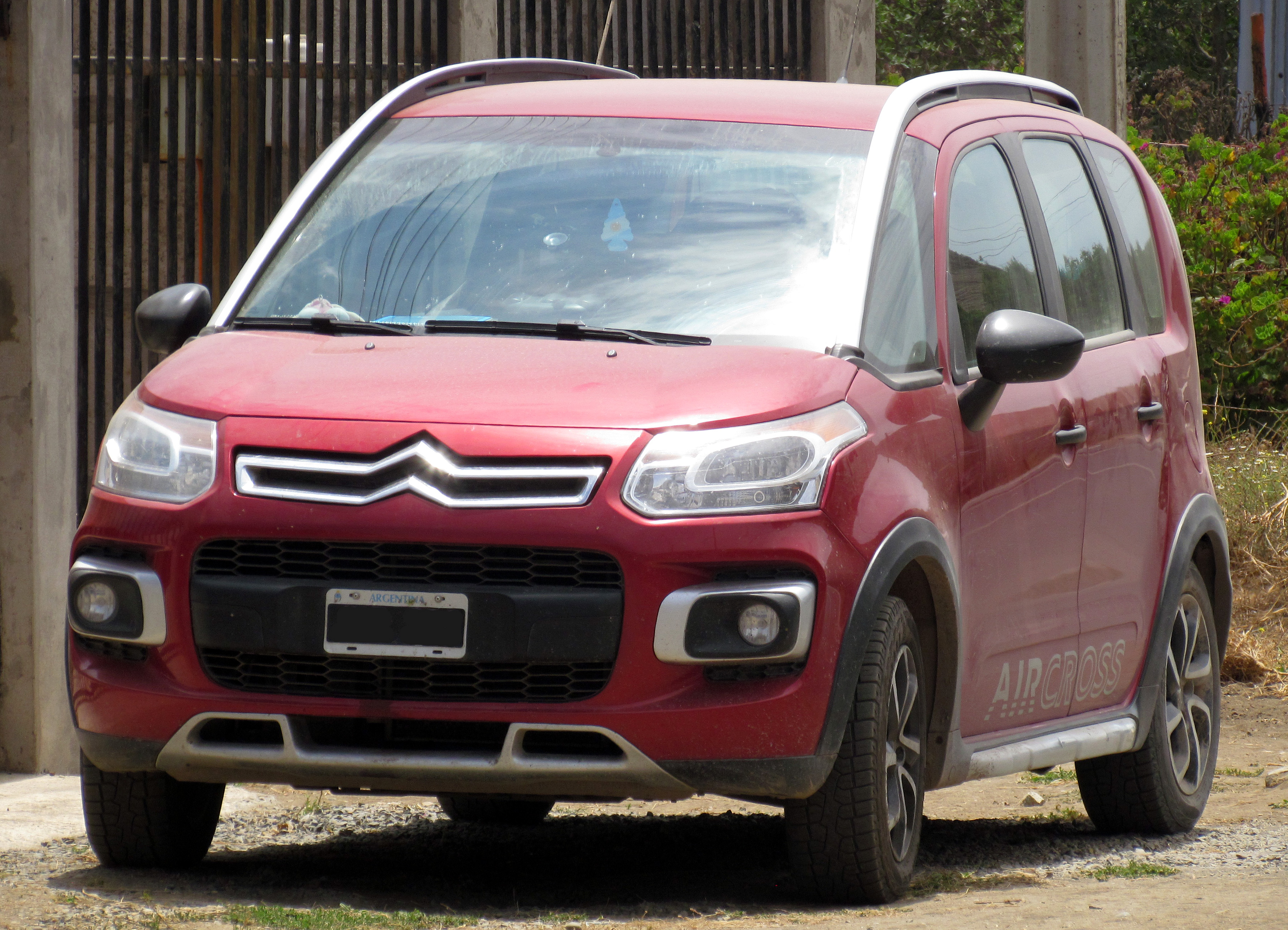

Overview
- Also called: Citroën Aircross (facelift)
- Production: 2010–2021
- Assembly: Brazil: Porto Real (PSA Brasil)
- Designer: Carlo Bonzanigo

Body and chassis
- Related: Citroën C3 Picasso; Citroën C3 Ellipse; command 23f

Powertrain
- Engine: Petrol: 1.5L 8V; 1.6 L EP6 VTi 16V I4
- Transmission: 5-speed manual

Dimensions
- Wheelbase: 2,540 mm (100.0 in)
- Length: 4,279 mm (168.5 in)
- Width: 1,723 mm (67.8 in)
- Height: 1,697 mm (66.8 in)
- Curb weight: 1,387 kg (3,058 lb)

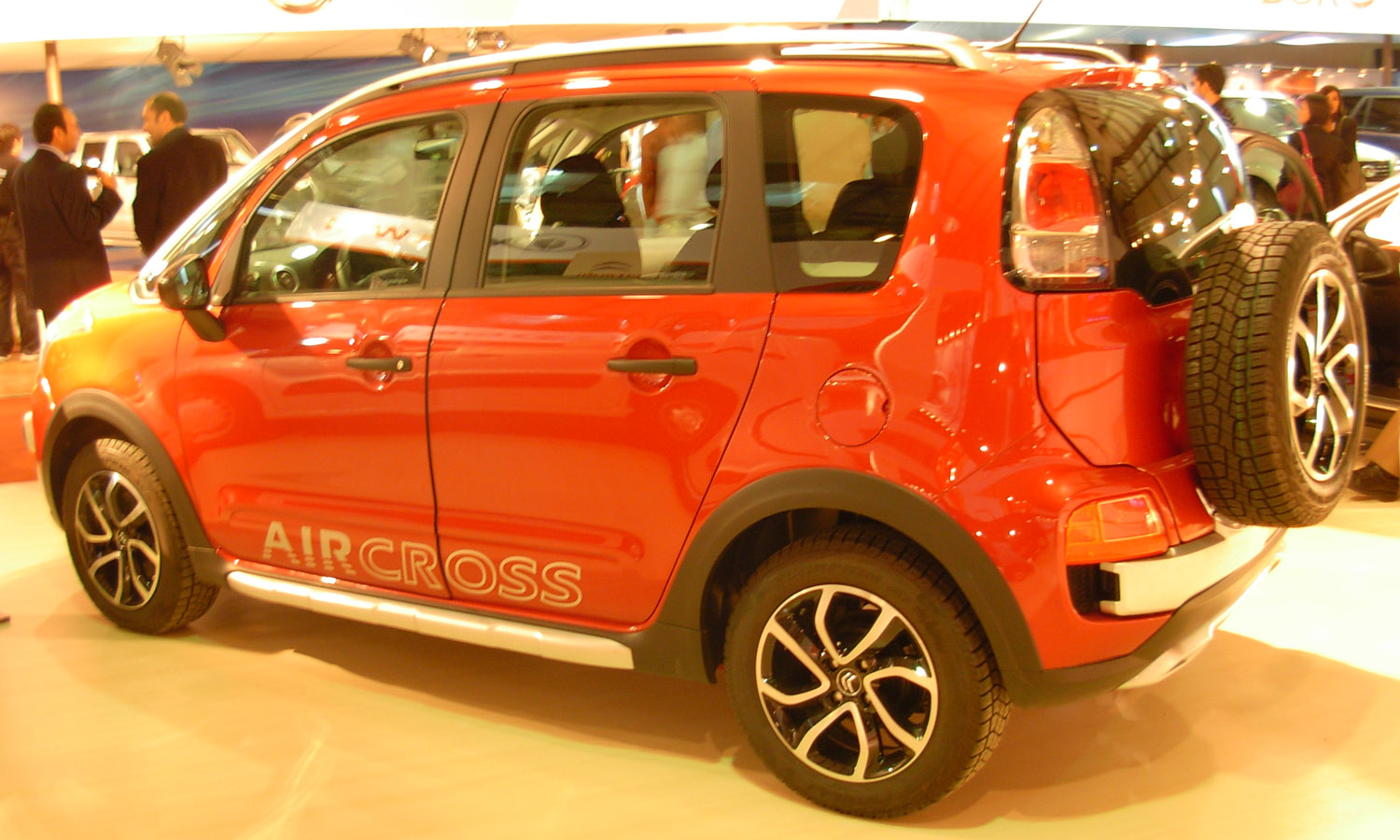
C3 Aircross (pre-facelift) rear side view, showing the higher ride height and spare wheel - added to create an off-road look

The Citroën C3 AirCross for Latin America is a mini SUV close with the global Citroën C3 Picasso. It was first announced by Citroën's Brazilian division in August 2010. The C3 AirCross is manufactured in Porto Real, Brazil, and was launched in the country in September 2010. It was exported to selected markets such as Argentina, Uruguay, Paraguay, Colombia and Costa Rica.

Compared with the global C3 Picasso, the restyled C3 AirCross has raised suspension, chrome roof bars, mirror covers, side skirts and a rear spare tyre. The C3 AirCross is based on the Brazilian first generation Citroën C3, when the global C3 Picasso is based on the global Peugeot 207 SW. The C3 Aircross is capable of running on E85 Bioethanol.

Ivan Segal, the managing director of Citroën of Brazil predicted sales of 30,000 Aircross models in a full year at launch, but lowered this expectation in 2011 to 2,000 Aircross models per month. Segal wanted to achieve this by targeting "young and adventurous" buyers.

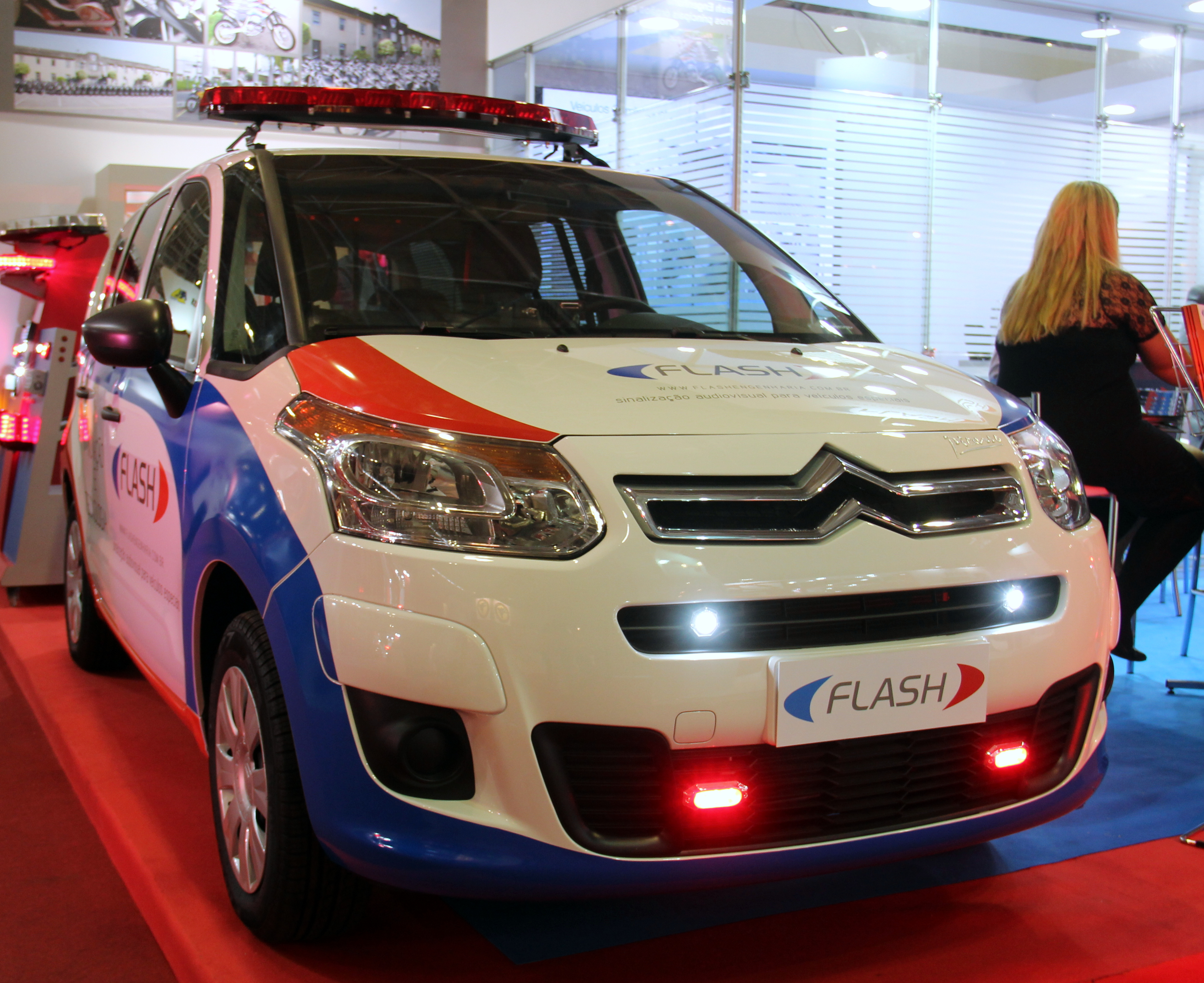
Citroën C3 Picasso (Brazilian model)

In May 2011, a non-crossover model derived from the C3 Aircross was launched. Although called C3 Picasso, it was closer to the C3 AirCross (same platform, same grille, same interior, no tailgate) than to the global C3 Picasso.

Late 2014, Citroën C3 AirCross Lunar showcar was revealed at São Paulo International Motor Show.

=== Design and features ===
The Aircross features an upholstered fabric interior, with corduroy or leather options. The engine supports are designed to collapse downwards slightly in a front end impact to prevent the engine from invading the cabin and injuring passengers. The C3 AirCross SX and Exclusive models have ABS, one of the few vehicles on sale in the Brazilian market with this feature.

The C3 AirCross was designed with an obligation for green materials to be used where viable. 20 kg (44.1 lb) of the vehicle's polymers, include the parcel shelf, boot carpet, and partial use in the doors, are from natural fibres to meet this target.

=== Engines ===
In Brazil, the Aircross is available with a four speed automatic or five speed manual gearbox.

Petrol engines
Model	Year	Engine code	Displacement (cc, cu in)	Power	Torque	0–100 km/h (0–62 mph) (seconds)	Top speed	Transmission	CO_{2} emissions (g/km)
1.5 litre 8v 90 (petrol)	2013–2021			90 PS (66 kW; 89 bhp)	140 N⋅m (103 lb⋅ft)			5 speed manual	
1.6 litre VTi 16v (petrol)	2010–2021	EP6	1,587 (97)	110 PS (81 kW; 108 bhp)	142 N⋅m (105 lb⋅ft)	14	165 km/h (103 mph)	5 speed manual	220
1.6 litre VTi 16v (alcohol)	2010–2021	EP6	1,587 (97)	113 PS (83 kW; 111 bhp)	155 N⋅m (114 lb⋅ft)	14	165 km/h (103 mph)	5 speed manual	220
1.6 litre VTi 120 (petrol)	2013–2021	EP6	1,587 (97)	115 PS (85 kW; 113 bhp)	152 N⋅m (112 lb⋅ft)			5 speed manual	
1.6 litre VTi 120 (alcohol)	2013–2021	EP6	1,587 (97)	122 PS (90 kW; 120 bhp)	161 N⋅m (119 lb⋅ft)			5 speed manual	

=== Restyling (AI58R; 2015) ===
In the end of 2015, a facelifted version of the C3 AirCross was introduced in South America as a model for 2016. The most significant changes are a new front end. The non-Aircross version (C3 Picasso) was dropped.

The name of the C3 AirCross was changed to Citroën Aircross.

In 2016, Citroën revealed a showcar based on the Aircross, called Aircross Beach Crosser.

The production of the Aircross ended early 2021.

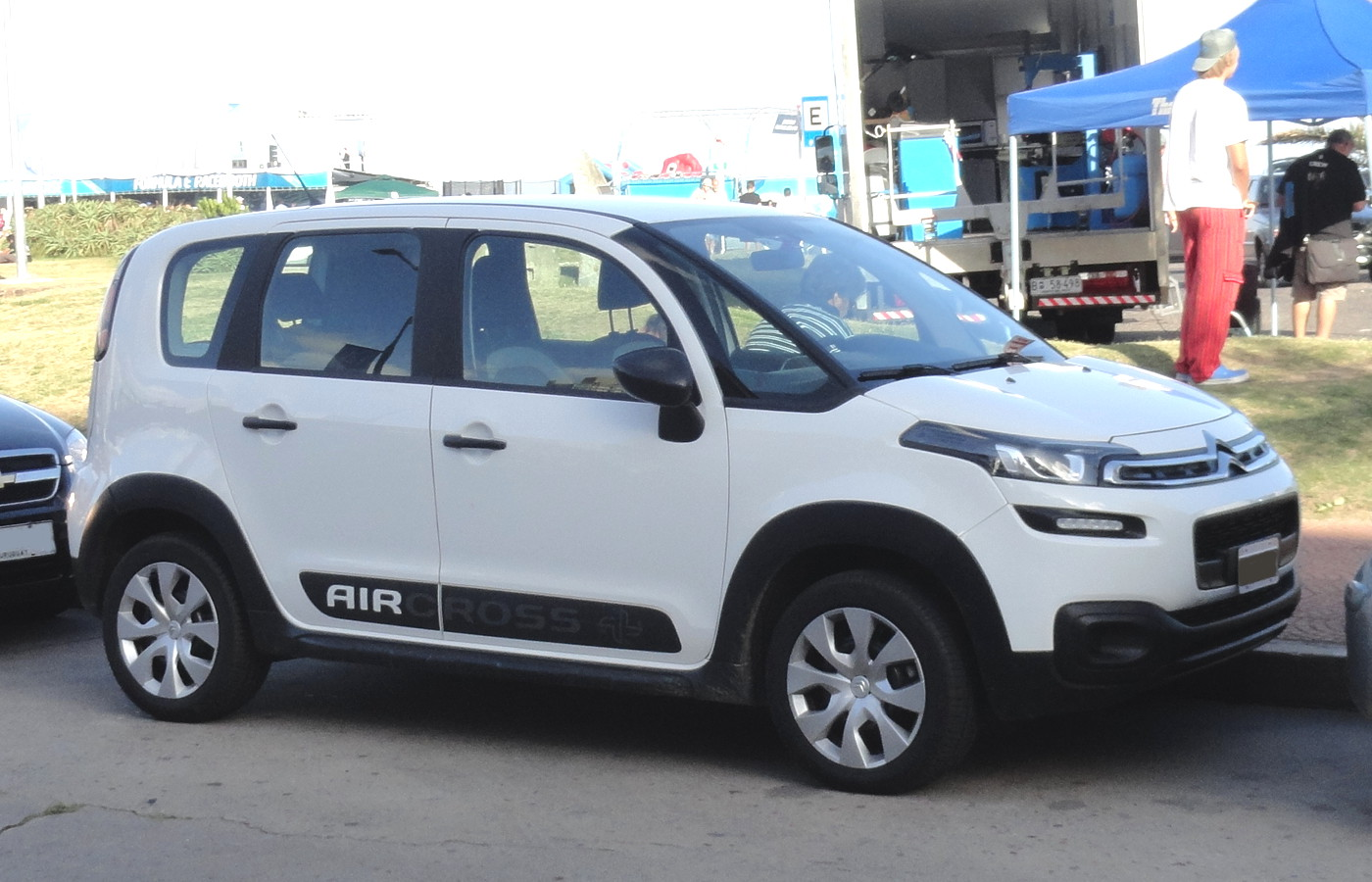
Facelift (front view)

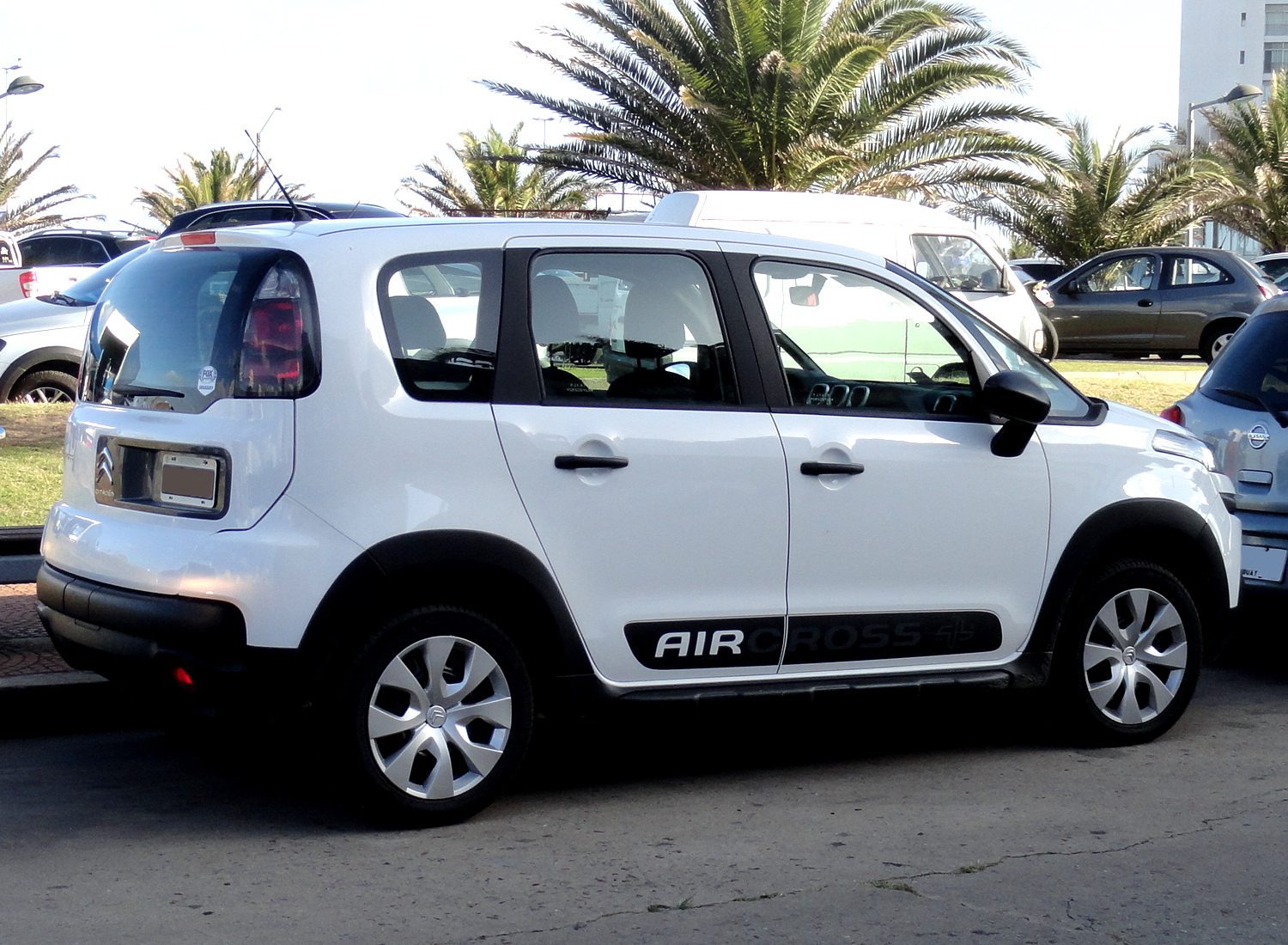
Facelift (rear view)

=== Reviews ===
Autoblog.com reviewed the C3 AirCross, giving a mostly negative review to aspects and features of the vehicle. The basic X model launched with no airbags, ABS, or temperature sensor; the last of which they consider to be a necessity in the hot Latin American climate. They criticised the boot, calling it awkward and complicated since it can only open once an arm carrying the spare tyre has been unlocked and swung out of the way, which increases the space required for parking.

Further, in their review, they complained that the dashboard mounted displays were difficult for the driver to see comfortably, echoing concerns CNET had when reviewing the C3 Picasso, where they called the displays "not particularly readable" and possibly dangerous to use while driving.

Only one engine is available for the C3 AirCross; a 1.6-litre HDi used in other Citroën cars, including the Latin American market's C3 Picasso. Autoblog.com's review was favourable to it since it performed very well in the Aircross off-road, although it was noisy on road. They found no discernible issues with the suspension, which handled well on and off the road, traversing irregular terrain without issues.

Overall, Autoblog.com considered the price of AR$80,000 to be unrealistically high for the lack of features they considered to be essential, and when compared to rivals.

== First generation (A88; 2017) ==
First generation
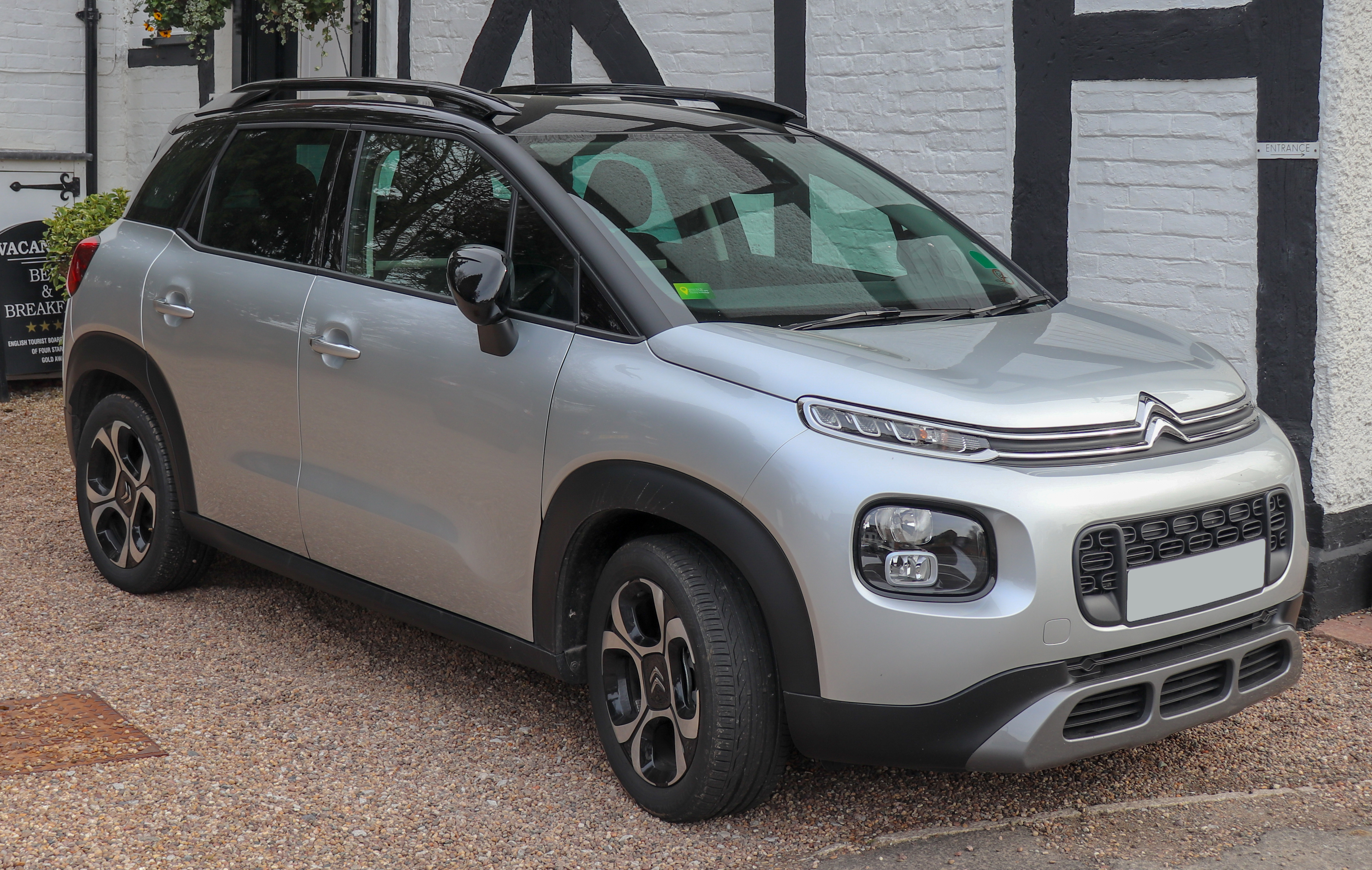
- 2019 Citroën C3 Aircross Flair

Overview
- Model code: A88
- Also called: Citroën C4 Aircross (China)
- Production: October 2017 – 2024
- Assembly: Spain: Zaragoza (Opel España de Automóviles); China: (DPCA)
- Designer: Frédéric Duvernier (exterior); Céline Manetta (interior); Pierre Icard (facelift, exterior)

Body and chassis
- Platform: PSA PF1 platform
- Related: Opel Crossland; Peugeot 2008 I

Powertrain
- Engine: Petrol: 1.2 L EB2F I3; 1.2 L EB2DT/EB2DTS turbo I3; Diesel: 1.5 L DW5 BlueHDI I4; 1.6 L DW6 BlueHDi I4
- Transmission: 5-speed manual (2017–2020); 6-speed manual 6-speed automatic

Dimensions
- Wheelbase: 2,604 mm (102.5 in); 2,655 mm (104.5 in) (China)
- Length: 4,150 mm (163.4 in); 4,270 mm (168.1 in) (China)
- Width: 1,760 mm (69.3 in)
- Height: 1,640 mm (64.6 in)

Chronology
- Predecessor: Citroën C3 Picasso; Citroën C4 Cactus

The Citroën C3 Aircross for Europe is a subcompact SUV from Citroën. Presented on 12 June 2017 in Paris, it has been marketed from October of the same year. The C3 Aircross was announced by the C-Aircross concept car, presented at the 2017 Geneva Motor Show.

It shares its platform and many elements with its cousin the Opel Crossland X that replaces the Meriva, following the partnership between Groupe PSA and General Motors, which was first announced in 2012. Its style, directed by Pierre Authier, is in harmony with that of the new Citroën range: front double decker, "3D" lights. The C3 Aircross also offers numerous possibilities for customisation.

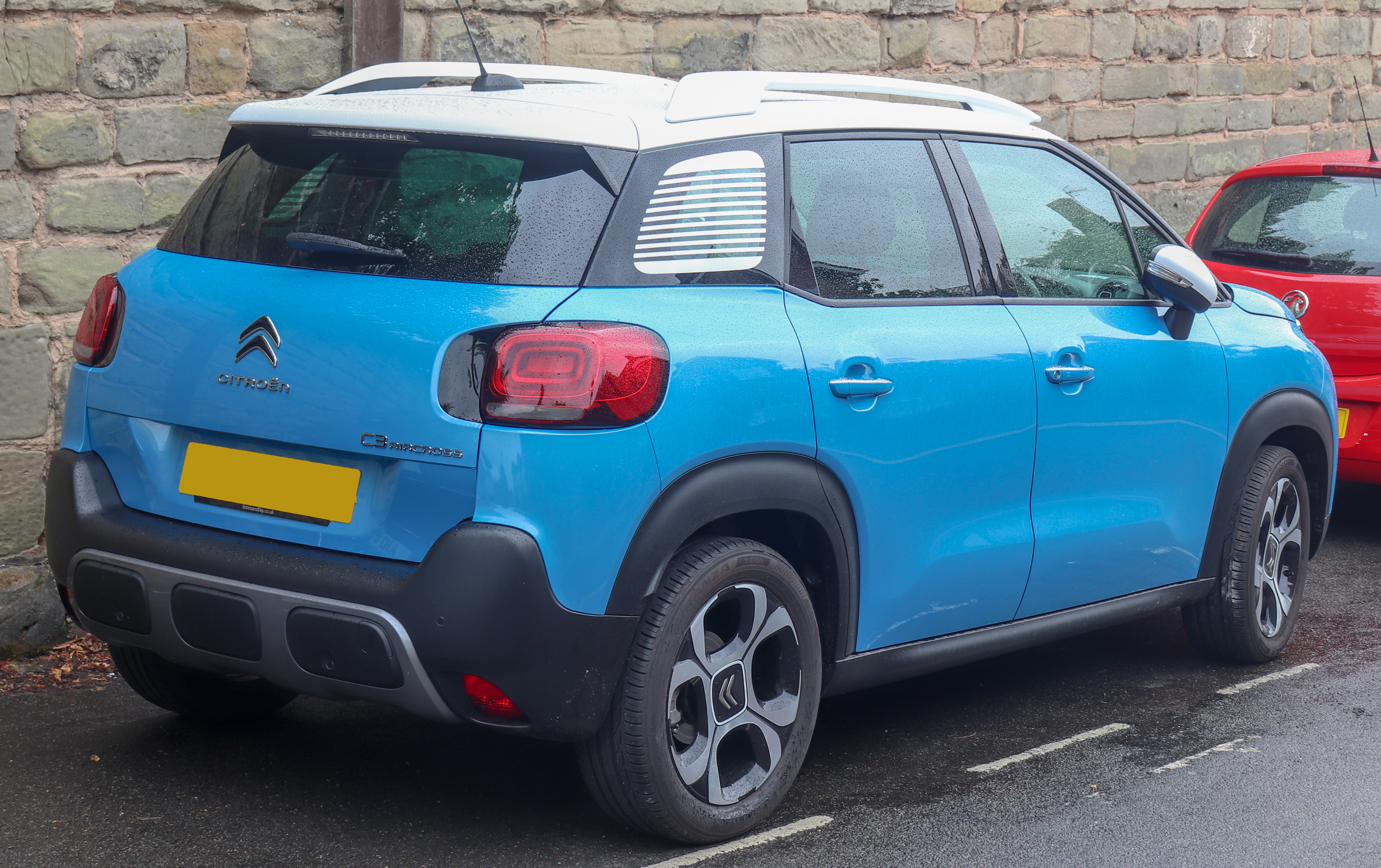
Rear view

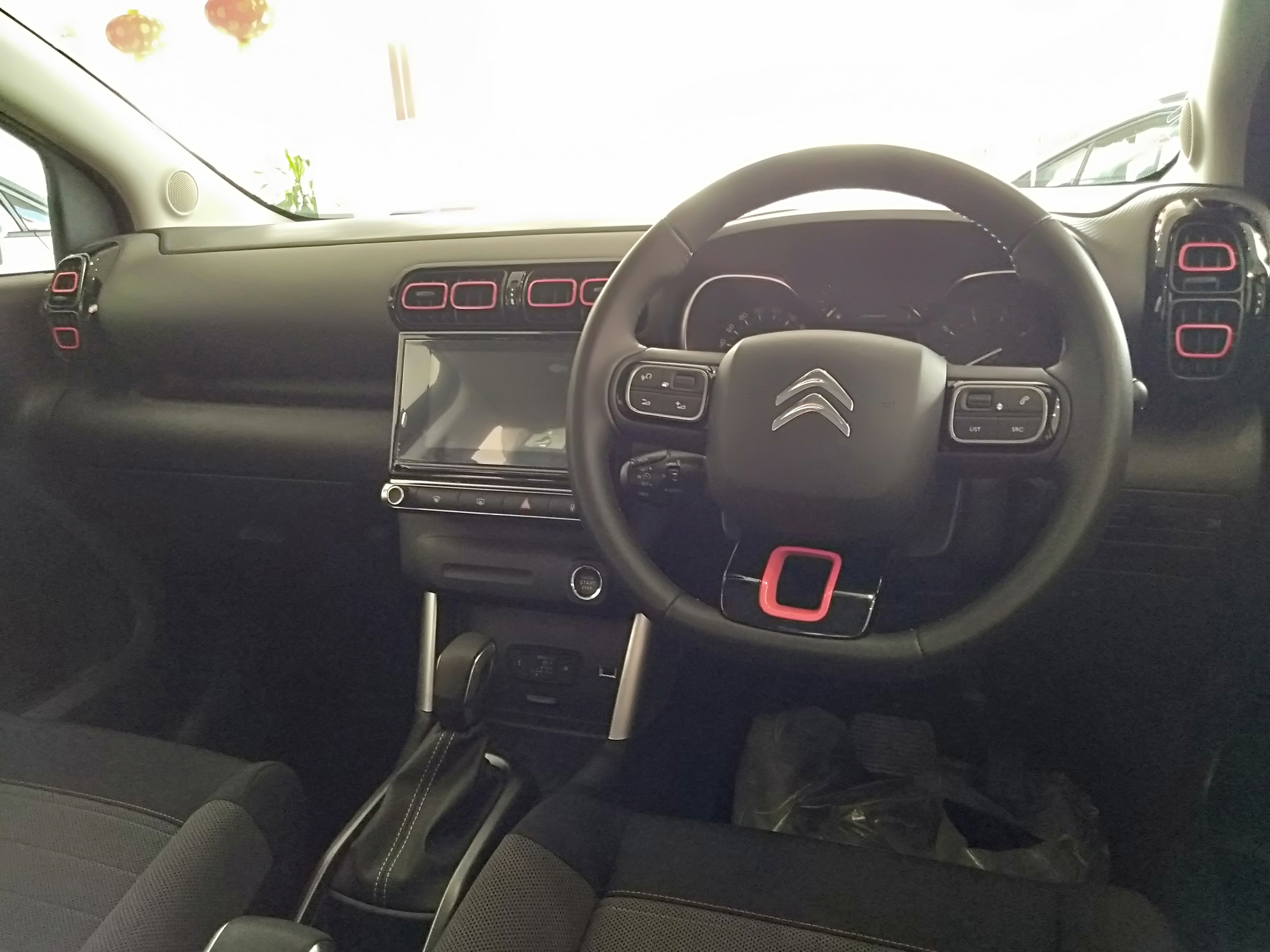
Interior

=== Citroën C4 Aircross ===
In China, a long wheel base version is launched in 2018. It is known as the C4 Aircross (full name: Dongfeng Citroën Yunyi C4 Aircross). Its wheelbase at 2,655 mm is 11.5 centimetres longer which results into a length of 4,270 mm. The Citroën C4 Aircross was prematurely discontinued in 2020 due to poor sales.

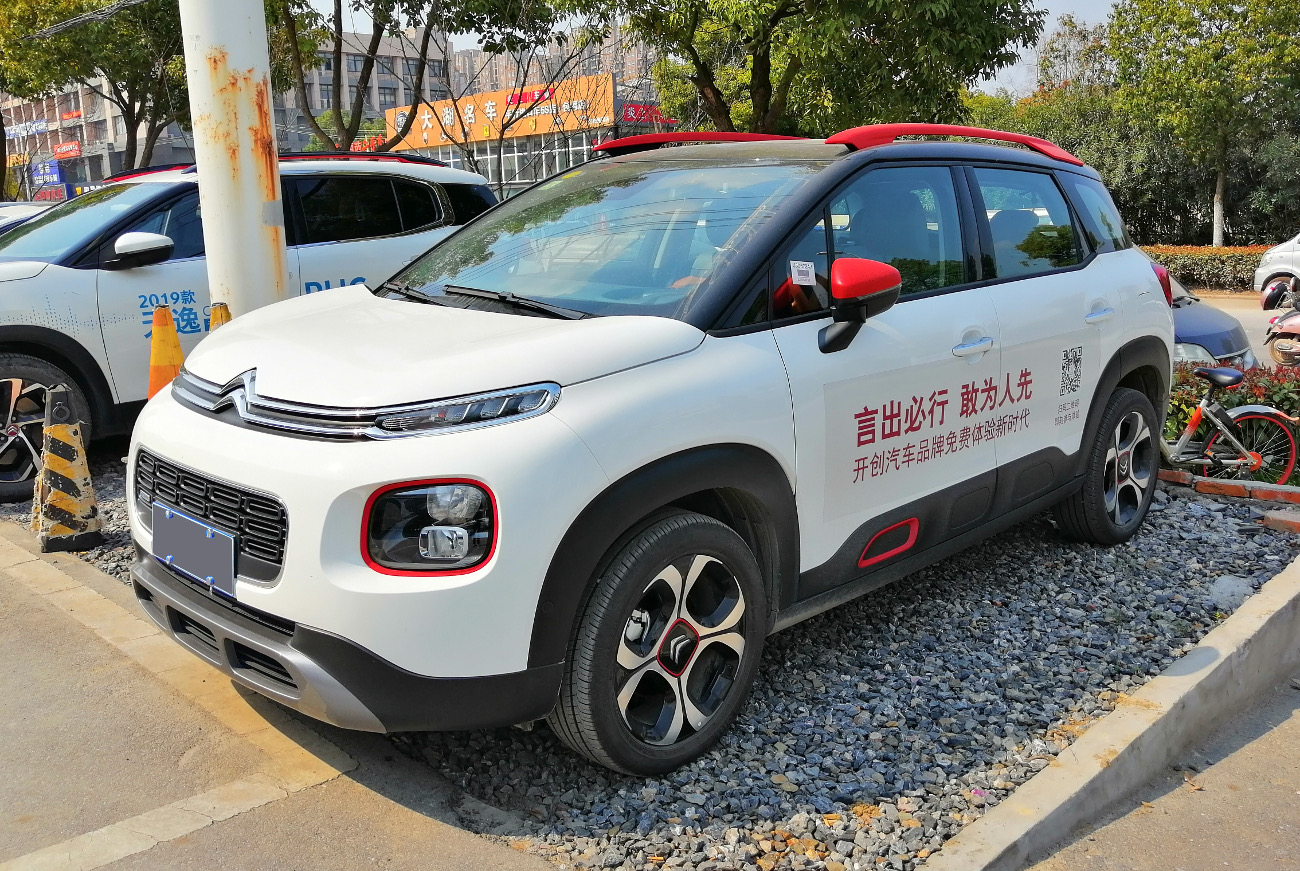
Citroën C4 Aircross (China)

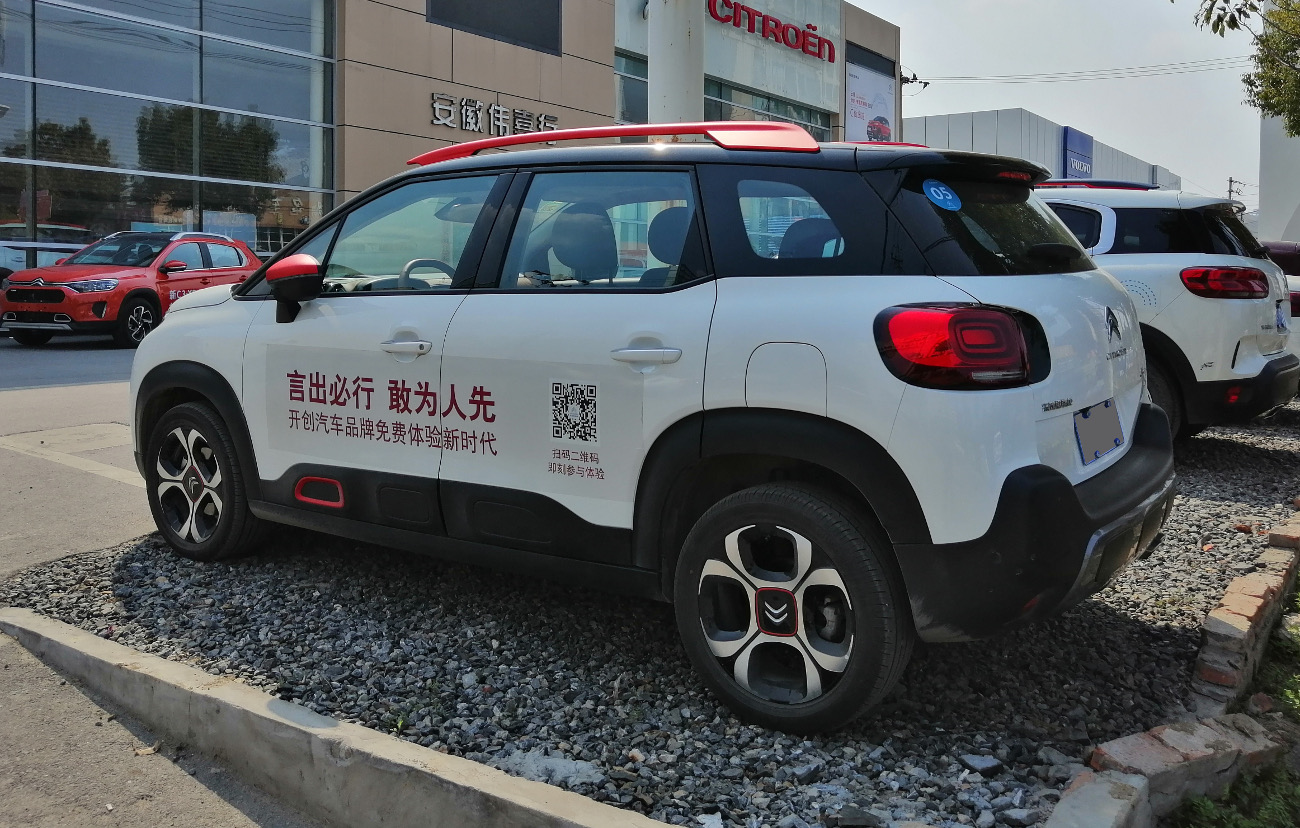
Rear view (China)

=== Facelift ===
The model underwent a mid-life restyling through a facelift (inspired by CXperience concept), revealed in February 2021, with production starting in June that year. The update includes sleeker, bolder headlights, revised grille and front bumper, along updated technology. The facelift brings different models.

Production was stopped in July 2024, after aproximatively 600,000 units assembled in Zaragoza plant.

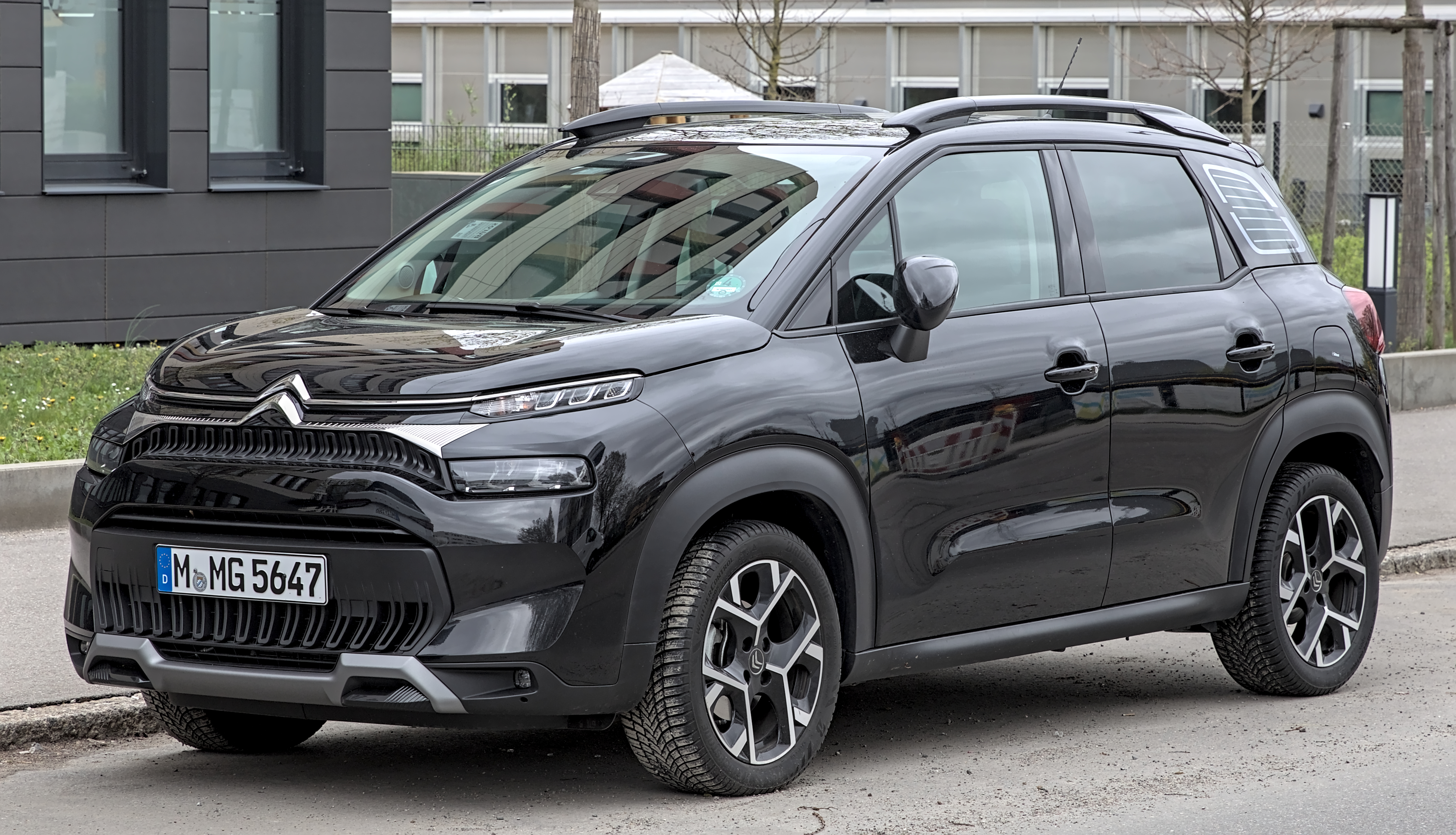
2021 Citroën C3 Aircross (Germany)

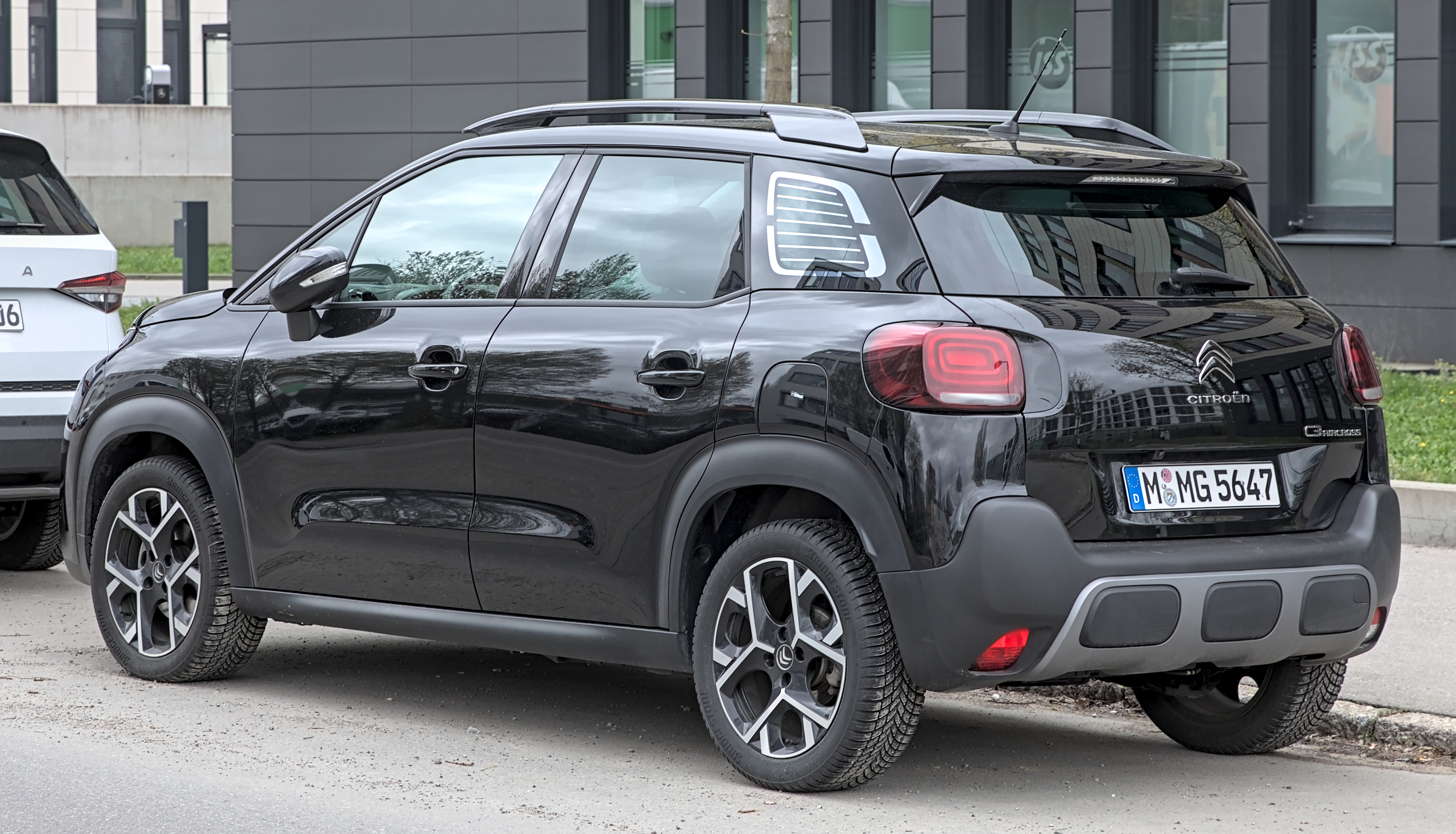
Rear view (Germany)

=== Powertrain ===
Pre-facelift models

Spec Model	Engine	Power	Torque	Displacement	Top speed	Transmission	Acceleration (0-60/100)	Drive	Model years
Petrol models
1.2 Puretech 82	1.2 L EB2F Puretech I3	82 hp (61 kW; 83 PS) @ 5750	118 N⋅m (87 lb⋅ft) @ 2750	1,199 cc (1.2 L; 73.2 cu in)	165 km/h (103 mph)	5-speed manual	14.0 sec	FWD	Nov 2017-Jul 2018
1.2 Puretech 110	1.2 L EB2DT/EB2DAT Puretech I3 turbo	110 hp (82 kW; 112 PS) @ 5500	205 N⋅m (151 lb⋅ft) @ 1500	1,199 cc (1.2 L; 73.2 cu in)	185 km/h (115 mph)	5-speed manual	10.2 sec	FWD	Nov 2017-Jul 2018
1.2 Puretech 110	1.2 L EB2DT/EB2DAT Puretech I3 turbo	110 hp (82 kW; 112 PS) @ 5500	205 N⋅m (151 lb⋅ft) @ 1750	1,199 cc (1.2 L; 73.2 cu in)	190 km/h (118 mph)	6-speed manual	10.1 sec	FWD	Jul 2018-Mar 2021
1.2 Puretech 110	1.2 L EB2DT/EB2DAT Puretech I3 turbo	110 hp (82 kW; 112 PS) @ 5500	205 N⋅m (151 lb⋅ft) @ 1500	1,199 cc (1.2 L; 73.2 cu in)	183 km/h (114 mph)	6-speed automatic	10.6 sec	FWD	Nov 2017-Jul 2018
1.2 Puretech 130	1.2 L EB2DTS Puretech I3 turbo	130 hp (97 kW; 132 PS) @ 5500	230 N⋅m (170 lb⋅ft) @ 1750	1,199 cc (1.2 L; 73.2 cu in)	200 km/h (124 mph)	6-speed manual	9.3 sec	FWD	Nov 2017-Jul 2018
1.2 Puretech 130	1.2 L EB2DTS Puretech I3 turbo	130 hp (97 kW; 132 PS) @ 5500	230 N⋅m (170 lb⋅ft) @ 1750	1,199 cc (1.2 L; 73.2 cu in)	195 km/h (121 mph)	6-speed automatic	9.3 sec	FWD	Oct 2019-Mar 2021
Diesel models
1.5 BlueHDi 102	1.5 L DW5 BlueHDI I4 turbo	102 hp (76 kW; 103 PS) @ 3500	250 N⋅m (184 lb⋅ft) @ 1750	1,499 cc (1.5 L; 91.5 cu in)	184 km/h (114 mph)	6-speed manual	10.8 sec	FWD	Aug 2018-Mar 2021
1.5 BlueHDi 120	1.5 L DW5 BlueHDI I4 turbo	120 hp (89 kW; 122 PS) @ 3750	300 N⋅m (221 lb⋅ft) @ 1750	1,499 cc (1.5 L; 91.5 cu in)	195 km/h (121 mph)	6-speed automatic	9.6 sec	FWD	Aug 2018-Mar 2021
1.6 BlueHDi 99	1.6 L DW6 BlueHDi I4 turbo	99 hp (74 kW; 100 PS) @ 3750	254 N⋅m (187 lb⋅ft) @ 1750	1,560 cc (1.6 L; 95.2 cu in)	175 km/h (109 mph); 178 km/h (111 mph) (S&S)	5-speed manual	11.5 sec	FWD	Nov 2017-Jul 2018
1.6 BlueHDi 120 S&S	1.6 L DW6 BlueHDi I4 turbo	120 hp (89 kW; 122 PS) @ 3500	300 N⋅m (221 lb⋅ft) @ 1750	1,560 cc (1.6 L; 95.2 cu in)	183 km/h (114 mph)	6-speed manual	9.8 sec	FWD	Nov 2017-Jul 2018

Facelift models

Spec Model	Engine	Power	Torque	Displacement	Top speed	Transmission	Acceleration (0-60/100)	Drive	Model years
Petrol models
1.2 Puretech 110	1.2 L EB2ADT Puretech I3 turbo	110 hp (82 kW; 112 PS) @ 5500	205 N⋅m (151 lb⋅ft) @ 1750	1,199 cc (1.2 L; 73.2 cu in)	182 km/h (113 mph)	6-speed manual	10.1 sec	FWD	June 2021—
1.2 Puretech 130	1.2 L EB2ADTS Puretech I3 turbo	131 hp (98 kW; 133 PS) @ 5500	230 N⋅m (170 lb⋅ft) @ 1750	1,199 cc (1.2 L; 73.2 cu in)	195 km/h (121 mph)	6-speed automatic	9.1 sec	FWD	June 2021—
Diesel models
1.5 BlueHDi 110	1.5 L DW5 BlueHDI I4 turbo	110 hp (82 kW; 112 PS) @ 3750	250 N⋅m (184 lb⋅ft) @ 1750	1,499 cc (1.5 L; 91.5 cu in)	178 km/h (111 mph)	6-speed manual	10.7 sec	FWD	June 2021—
1.5 BlueHDi 120	1.5 L DW5 BlueHDI I4 turbo	120 hp (89 kW; 122 PS) @ 3750	300 N⋅m (221 lb⋅ft) @ 1750	1,499 cc (1.5 L; 91.5 cu in)	188 km/h (117 mph)	6-speed automatic	10.1 sec	FWD	June 2021—

=== Acknowledgement ===
Jeremy Clarkson in the Grand Tour reviewed the Aircross and showed that the vehicle could tow a 30,000 ton Neptune car carrier ferry a distance of 25 metres, chase a De Tomaso Pantera until the robber's car broke down, fit 4 children inside with him, and even take the route of the Tunisian general Hannibal from 218 BC, going faster than an elephant.

== Second generation (CC 2024) ==
=== Europe (2024) ===
Second generation (Europe)
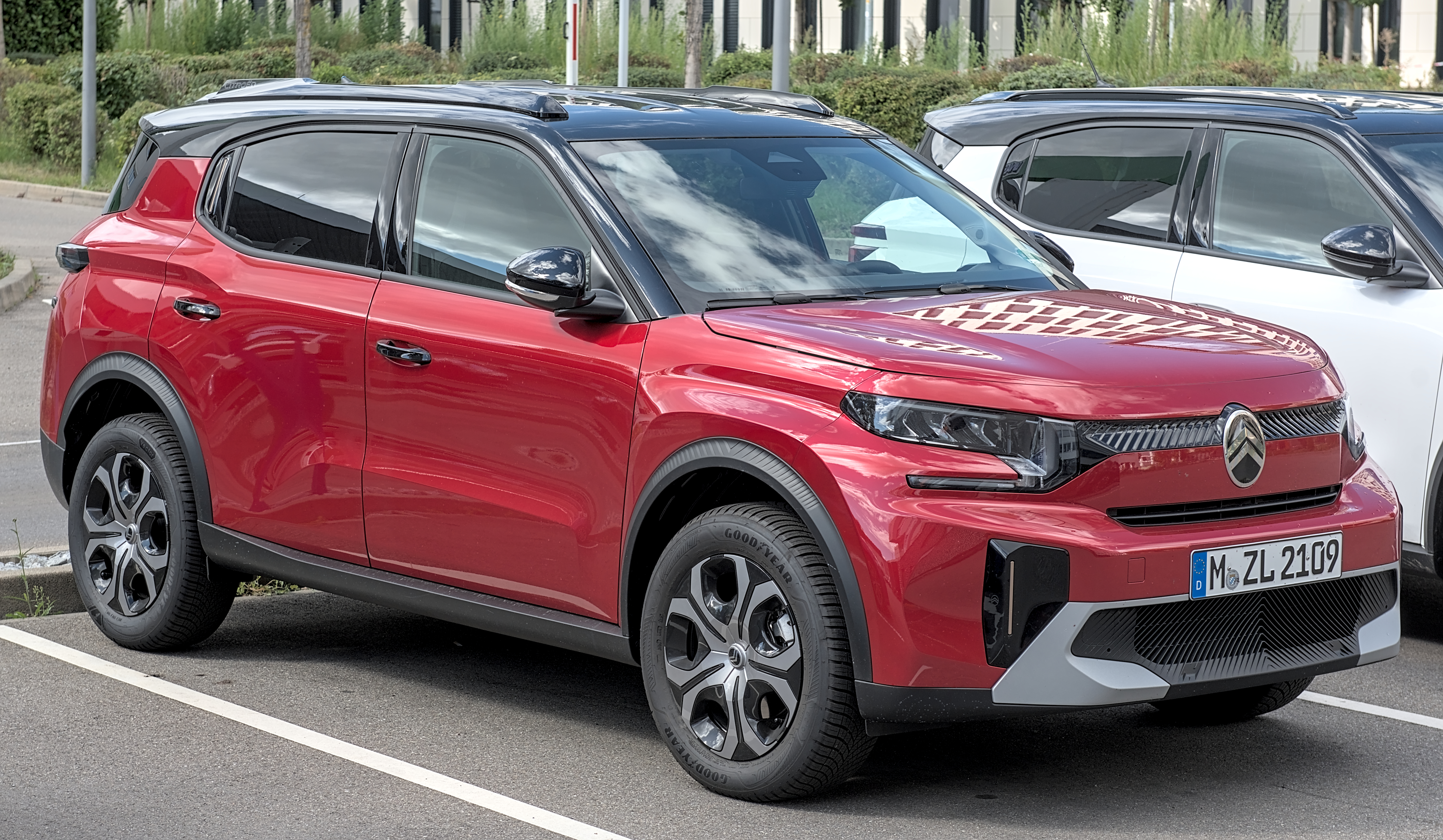
- 2024 Citroën C3 Aircross

Overview
- Production: 2024–present
- Assembly: Slovakia: Trnava

Body and chassis
- Body style: 5-door crossover SUV
- Platform: Smart Car Platform
- Related: Citroën C3 (CC21); Opel Frontera; Fiat Grande Panda; Fiat Grizzly / Chrysler Arrow Cross

Powertrain
- Engine: Petrol: 1.2 THP (EB2LTED) I3; Petrol mild hybrid: 1.2 THP (EB2LTEDH2) I3
- Electric motor: Permanent magnet synchronous (ë-C3 Aircross)
- Power output: 101–145 PS (100–143 hp; 74–107 kW) (petrol); 113 PS (111 hp; 83 kW) (ë-C3 Aircross)
- Transmission: 6-speed manual; 6-speed dual-clutch automatic
- Hybrid drivetrain: Mild hybrid
- Battery: 44 kWh LFP (ë-C3 Aircross)

Dimensions
- Wheelbase: 2,670 mm (105.1 in)
- Length: 4,390 mm (172.8 in)
- Width: 1,790 mm (70.5 in)
- Height: 1,660 mm (65.4 in)
- Curb weight: 1,298–1,504 kg (2,862–3,316 lb)

The second-generation C3 Aircross for the European market was unveiled on 18 April 2024, with full specifications revealed including interior photos on 19 June. It is built on the Smart Car Platform underpinning the Opel Frontera and it will be available with petrol mild hybrid and battery electric powertrains. For the first time in its segment, it is offered with a 7-seater option and the first B-SUV to be marketed in Europe at a price less than €20,000 for the ICE version.

Compared to the Indian market C3 Aircross, the European version C3 Aircross uses a different front fascia with all-LED lighting, it features Citroën's latest logos, different alloy wheel designs, different designs for the headlights and taillights, and a different front and rear bumpers. It features design elements previewed by the Oli Concept in September 2022.

The interior of the C3 Aircross is similar to the C3, featuring the C-Zen Lounge concept with Citroën's Head-Up Display and a flat-bottom design steering wheel. Like the C3, it will feature Citroën Advanced Comfort Suspension along with new Citroën Advanced Comfort Seats.

The C3 Aircross is available with two engines: a 1.2-litre PureTech Turbo and a 1.2-litre PureTech Hybrid petrol that is equipped with a 48-volt mild hybrid system. For the first time, it is also available with a fully electric (battery electric) powertrain producing 83 kW (113 PS; 111 hp) and an electric range of over 300 km (186 mi).

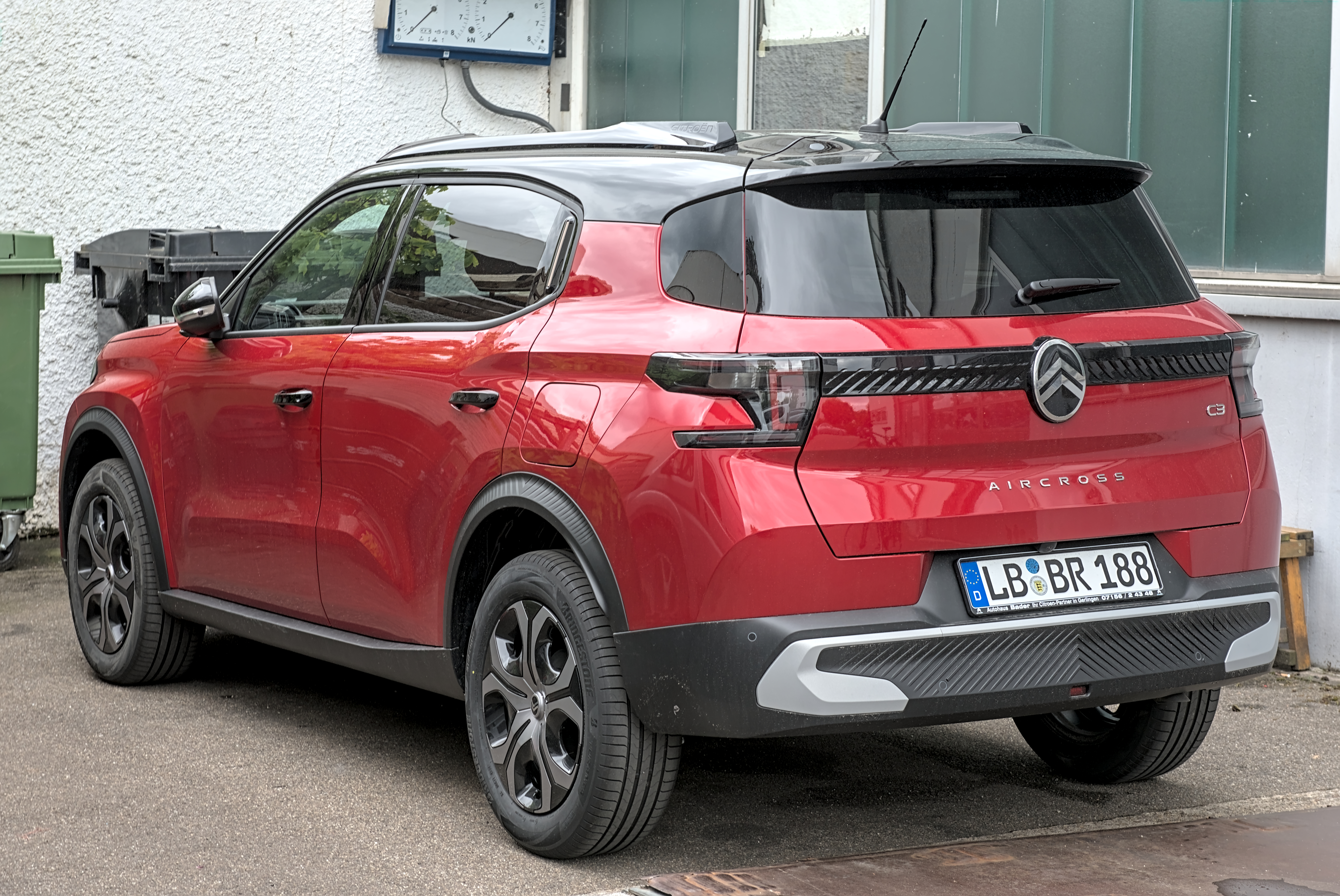
Rear view

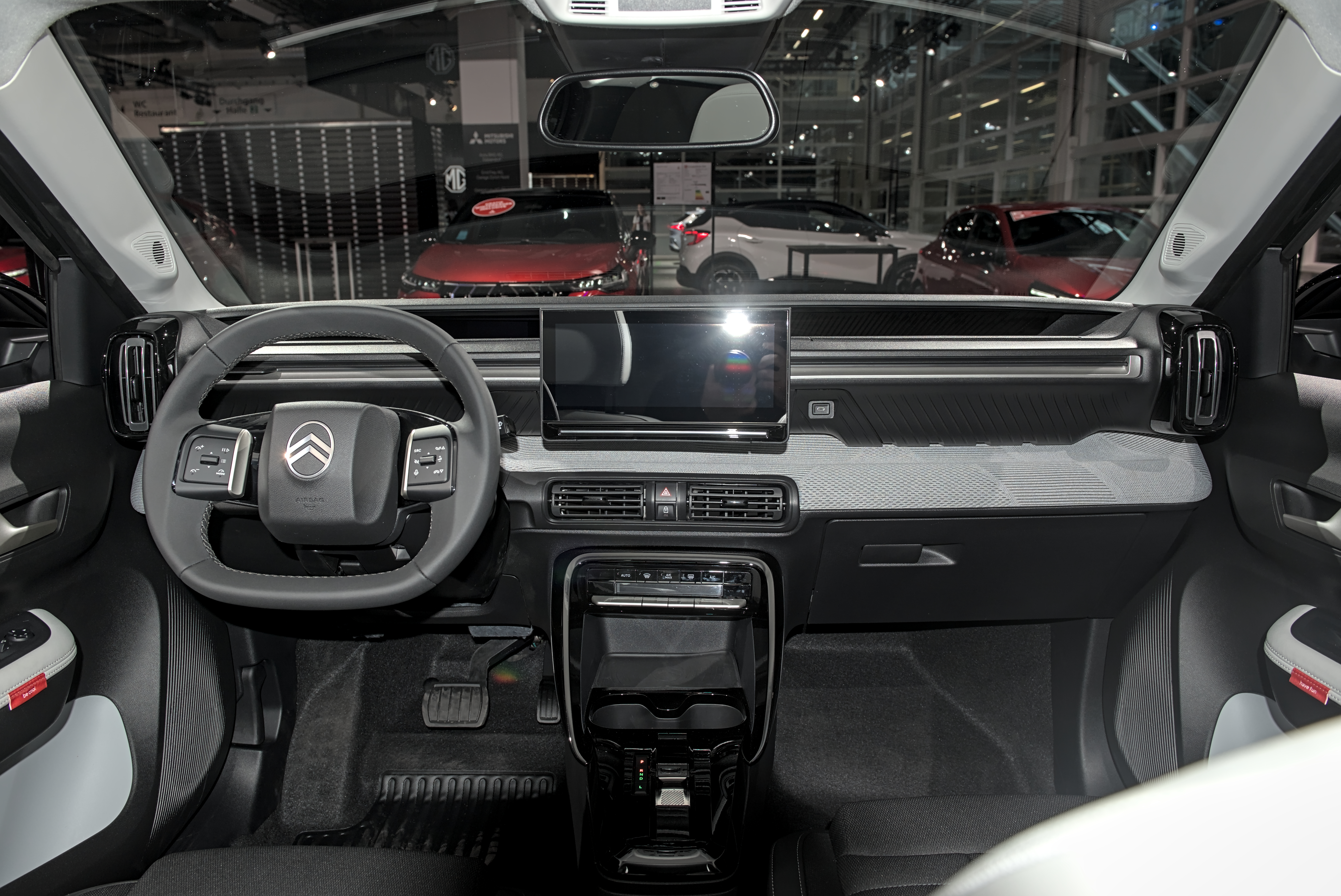
Interior

=== Asia, Africa and Latin America (2023) ===
Second generation (India and Latin America)
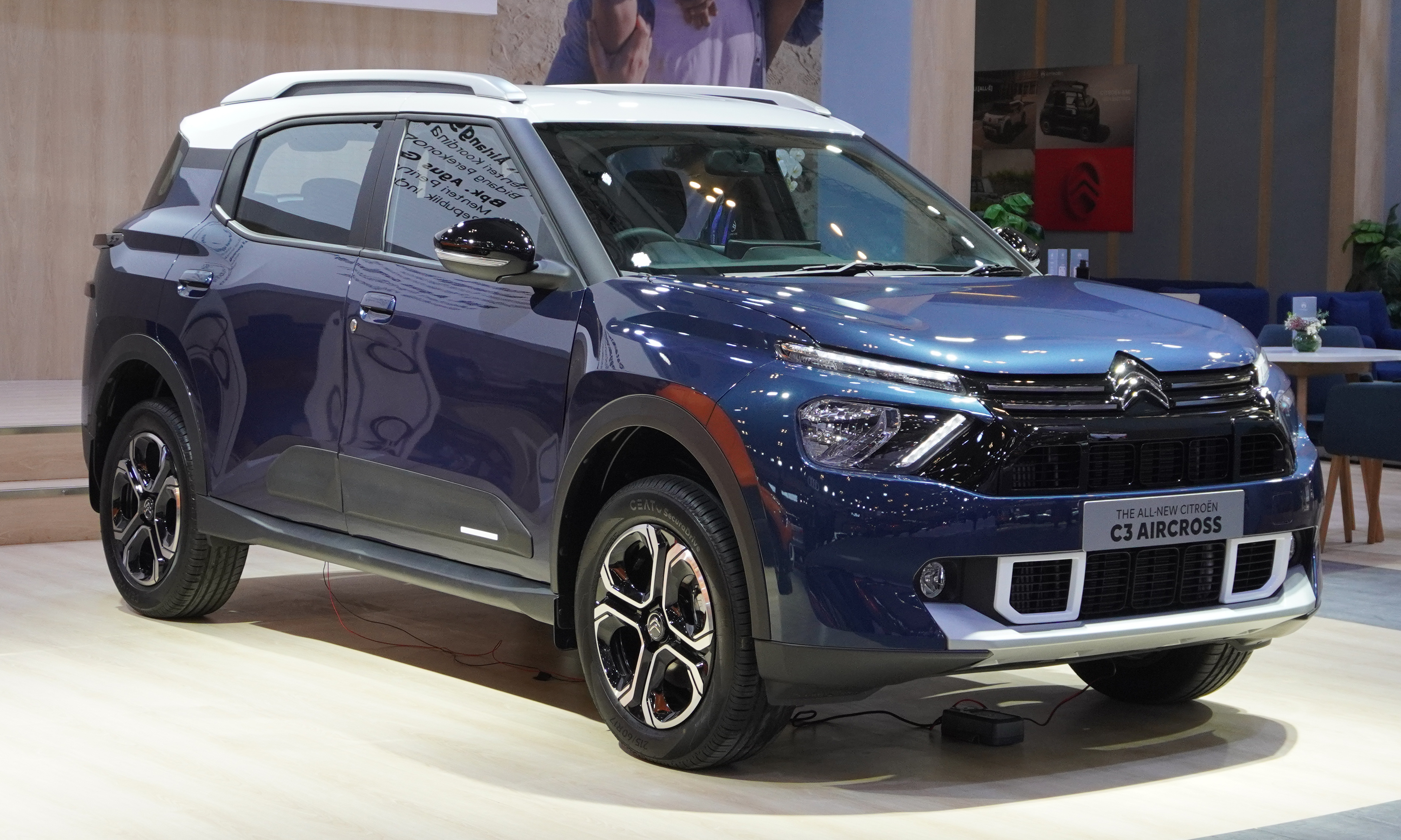
- Citroën C3 Aircross (Indian-built model)

Overview
- Model code: CC24
- Also called: Citroën Aircross (India, 2024–present)
- Production: 2023–present
- Assembly: India: Tiruvallur (Citroën India); Brazil: Porto Real (Stellantis do Brasil)

Body and chassis
- Body style: 5-door crossover SUV
- Platform: Smart Car Platform
- Related: Citroën C3 (CC21); Citroën Basalt; Fiat Grizzly

Powertrain
- Engine: Petrol: 1.0 L T200 turbo I3; 1.2 L EB2DT turbo I3; 1.3 L Firefly I4; 1.6 L VTi I4
- Transmission: 6-speed manual 6-speed automatic CVT

Dimensions
- Wheelbase: 2,671 mm (105.2 in)
- Length: 4,323 mm (170.2 in)
- Width: 1,796 mm (70.7 in)
- Height: 1,669 mm (65.7 in)
- Curb weight: 1,195–1,309 kg (2,635–2,886 lb)

Citroën unveiled the second generation of the C3 Aircross in India and Brazil on 27 April 2023. Compared to its predecessor, the second-generation model is significantly larger with an increased length by 160 mm (6.3 in) and the availability of third-row seating. It is the second model in Citroën's C-Cubed programme, it features similar styling elements and interior layout from the C3, and is based on the Smart Car Platform with the European model using the same platform.

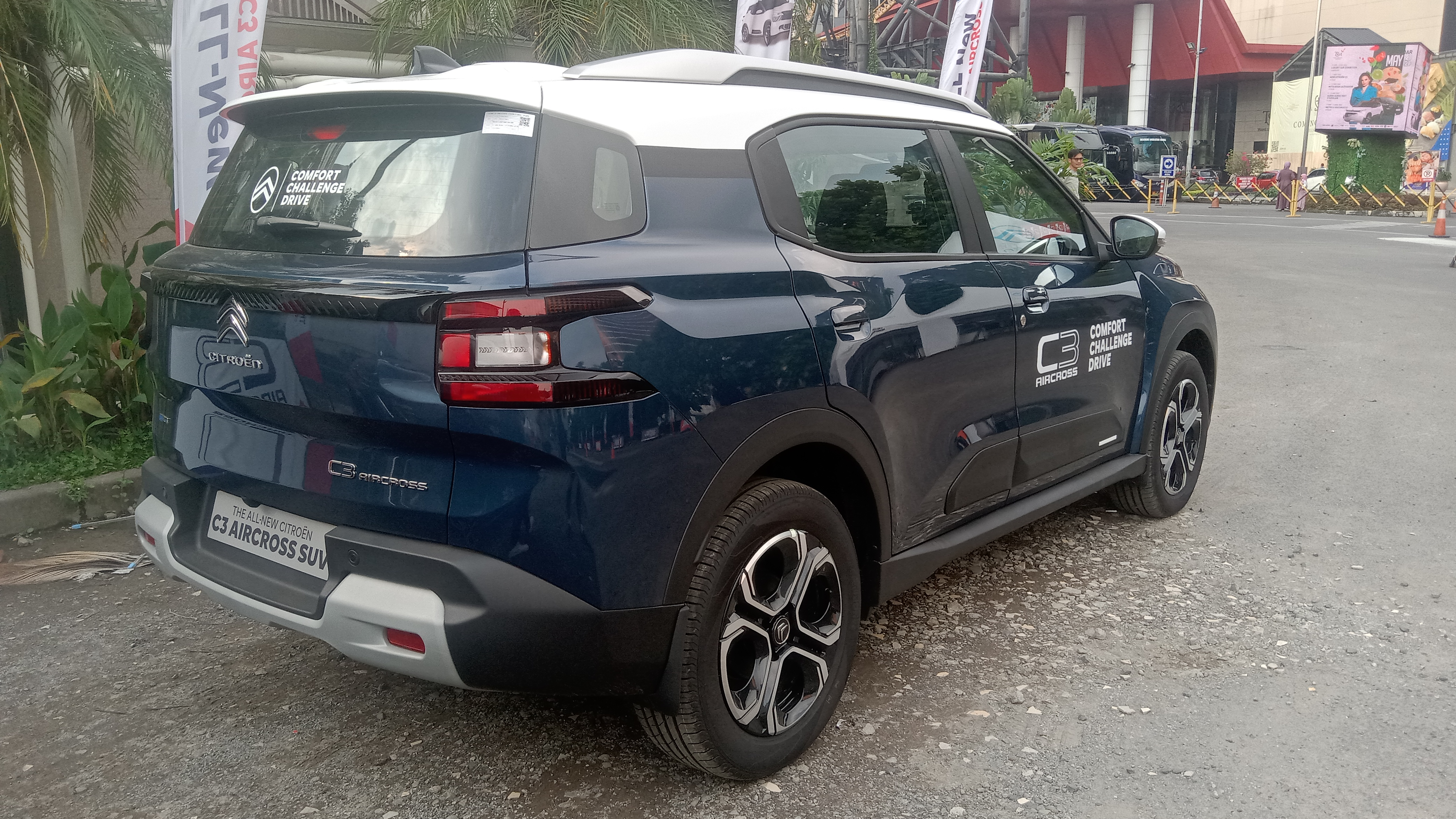
Rear view

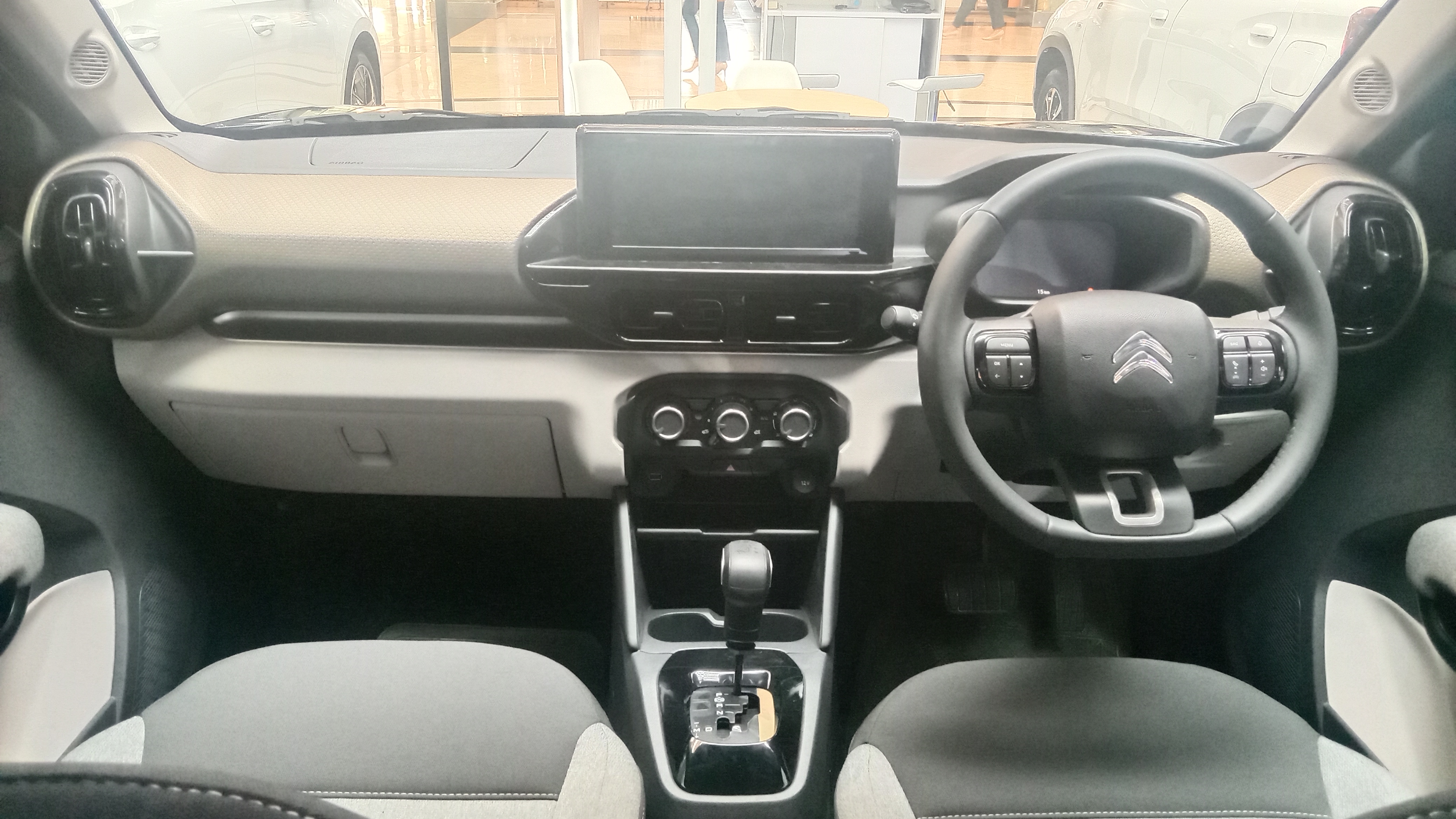
Interior

==== Markets ====
===== Argentina =====
The C3 Aircross was launched in Argentina on 7 May 2024, in three trim levels: Live, Feel Pack and Shine. It is available with either 5 and 7-seater configurations. Two engine options are available: a 1.0-litre turbocharged petrol (marketed as T200) and a 1.6-litre VTi petrol.

===== Brazil =====
The C3 Aircross was launched in Brazil on 29 November 2023, in three trim levels: Feel, Feel Pack and Shine. It is available with either 5 and 7-seater configurations. All variants are powered by a 1.0-litre turbocharged petrol.

The Brazilian model is locally assembled at the Porto Real Plant and is exported to various Latin American markets.

===== India =====
The C3 Aircross was launched in India on 15 September 2023, with deliveries commenced later on 15 October. It is available in You, Plus and Max trim levels and available with either 5 and 7-seater configurations. In January 2024, the automatic variant was made available for the Plus and Max trim levels.

Citroën claimed that over 90% of its components are locally sourced at the Tiruvallur plant in Tamil Nadu and it will be exported to ASEAN, Nepal and South African markets.

In India, the C3 Aircross received persistent criticism over the lack of equipment offered on the model. As a result of this negative feedback, Citroën revises its offering in this market in August 2024, adding automatic climate control, rear ventilation vents, LED headlamps, a folding key, a wider front armrest, rear window controls on the rear door panels, as well as 6 airbags as standard. The model was also renamed from C3 Aircross to simply the Citroën Aircross.

===== Indonesia =====
The C3 Aircross was introduced in Indonesia at the 30th Gaikindo Indonesia International Auto Show in August 2023, and later launched in Indonesia on 23 April 2024. Imported from India, it is available in a sole variant and 7-seater configuration.

===== South Africa =====
The C3 Aircross was launched in South Africa on 16 July 2024 in a sole Max trim, available in either 5- and 7-seater configurations, powered by a 1.2-litre PureTech turbocharged petrol paired to an 6-speed automatic. The Plus trim (5-seater) powered by a 1.2-litre petrol was made available in December 2024. In February 2026, the C3 Aircross line-up was updated for the 2026 model year which saw additional standard features.

==== Safety ====
===== Bharat NCAP =====
Bharat NCAP (based on Latin NCAP 2016) tested the vehicle in 2025:

Bharat NCAP test results Citroen C3 Aircross (5-seater) (2025, based on Latin NCAP 2016)
Test	Score	Stars
Adult occupant protection	27.05/32.00	5 /5 stars
Child occupant protection	40.00/49.00	5 /5 stars

===== Latin NCAP =====
In 2024, the C3 Aircross in its most basic Latin American configuration obtained 0 stars from Latin NCAP 3.0 (similar to Euro NCAP 2014).

2024 Citroën C3 Aircross
Latin NCAP 3.0 scores (2024, similar to Euro NCAP 2014)
Overall	0/5 stars

=== Citroën Basalt ===
A coupe version called the Basalt was revealed as a show car in India and in Brazil on 27 March 2024. The series production in India started in June 2024.

== Sales ==
=== Brazilian C3 Picasso-based model ===
Year	Brazil		Argentina	
Year	C3 Aircross	C3 Picasso	C3 Aircross	C3 Picasso
2010	4,244			
2011	16,717	4,702	4,341	2,061
2012	11,931	9,111	3,910	3,263
2013	9,358	6,582	5,517	5,562
2014	7,294	3,688	2,450	2,944
2015	4,664	1,335	1,078	1,147
2016	7,464	14	3,924	
2017	8,316		5,180	
2018	5,566		2,986	
2019	2,806		1,396	
2020	679		910	
2021	49		576	

=== Global standalone model ===
Year	Europe	Turkey
2017	16,982	
2018	110,394	
2019	112,089	
2020	75,281	
2021	68,608	
2022	64,043	5,447
2023		8,085
2024		4,290

=== Asia and Latin America model ===
Year	Brasil	Argentina	Uruguay	Indonesia
2023	188	/	/	—
2024	8,284	3 377	539	836
2025	5,650	7,378	241	532
