= Opel Crossland =

Subcompact crossover SUV

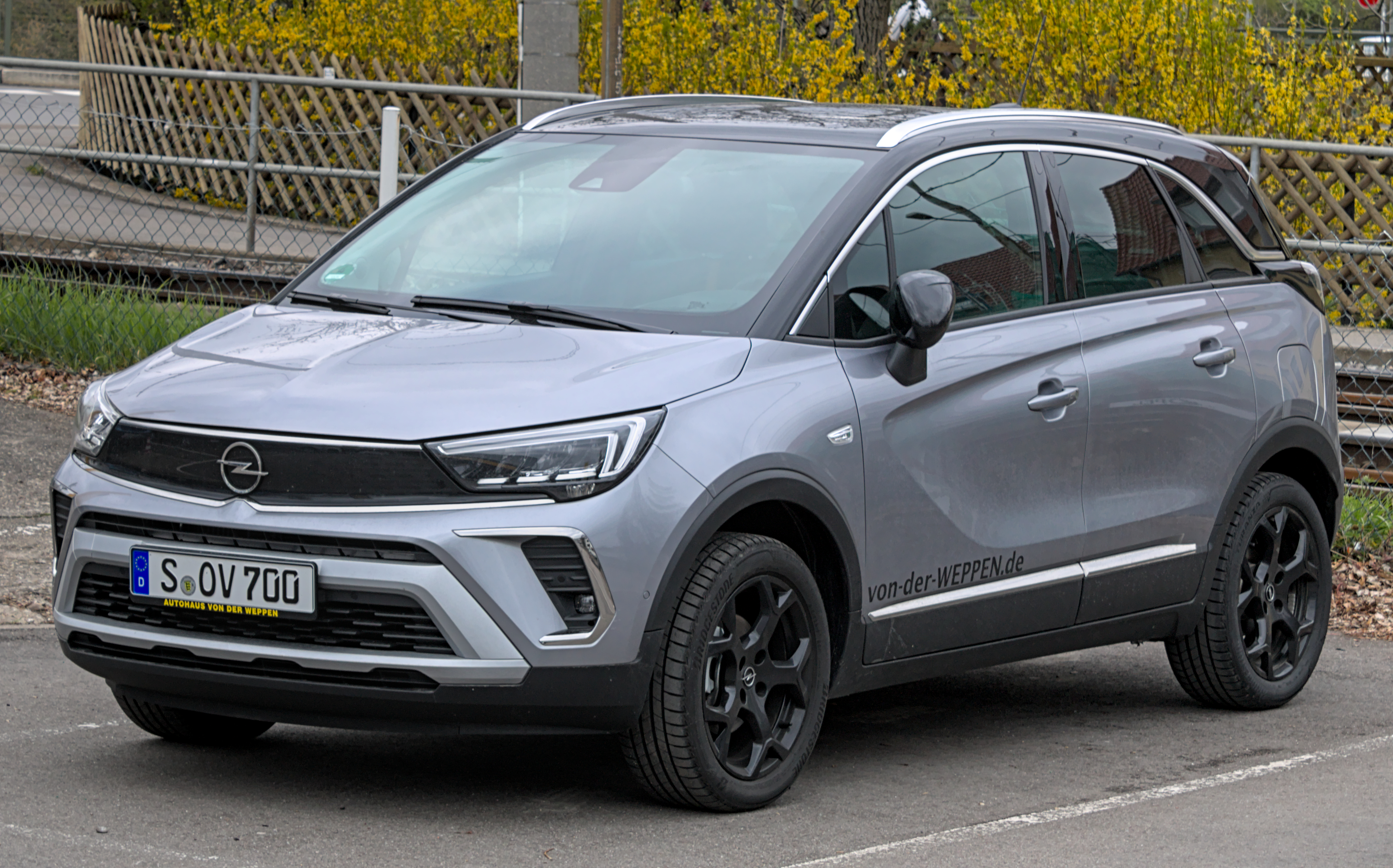
- Opel Crossland (facelift)

Overview
- Manufacturer: Opel (Note: PSA Group (2017–2021); Stellantis (2021–2024))
- Also called: Vauxhall Crossland (United Kingdom); Opel/Vauxhall Crossland X (2017–2020)
- Production: 2017–2024
- Assembly: Spain: Zaragoza (Opel España de Automóviles)
- Designer: Marc van der Haegen

Body and chassis
- Class: Subcompact crossover SUV (B)
- Body style: 5-door SUV
- Layout: Front-engine, front-wheel-drive
- Platform: PSA PF1 platform
- Related: Citroën C3 (Second Generation); Citroën C3 Picasso; Citroën C3 Aircross (First Generation); Citroën C4 Cactus; DS 3 Peugeot 206; Peugeot 207; Peugeot 208 (first generation); Peugeot 2008 (first generation)

Powertrain
- Engine: Petrol: 1.2 L EB2F I3; 1.2 L EB2DT/EB2DTS turbo I3; Petrol CNG: 1.2 L EB2FA I3; Diesel: 1.6 L DV6 BlueHDi I4
- Transmission: 5/6-speed manual; 6-speed automatic

Dimensions
- Wheelbase: 2,605 mm (102.6 in)
- Length: 4,212 mm (165.8 in)
- Width: 1,765 mm (69.5 in)
- Height: 1,605 mm (63.2 in)
- Curb weight: 1,163–1,319 kg (2,564–2,908 lb)

Chronology
- Predecessor: Opel Meriva
- Successor: Opel Frontera

The Opel Crossland is a subcompact crossover SUV (B-segment) marketed by Opel from 2017 to 2024, after having been unveiled to the media in January 2017. The car was shown at the Geneva Motor Show in March 2017, and was originally known as the Opel and Vauxhall Crossland X. It went on sale in the summer of 2017 and was marketed as the Vauxhall Crossland in the United Kingdom. The Opel Meriva was discontinued simultaneously with the introduction of the Crossland, as demand for crossovers and SUVs in the B-segment was growing at the expense of compact MPVs.

The Crossland was succeeded by the Frontera in 2024.

== Overview ==
The Crossland was built at the Opel factory in Zaragoza, Spain. It is based on a modified version of Groupe PSA's PF1 platform, which is used by the Citroën C3 Picasso and the Peugeot 2008, shared with the Citroën C3 Aircross. The Crossland X received a facelift in 2020 and was renamed to “Opel Crossland”, dropping the "X".

Production was stopped in July 2024, after approximatively 600,000 unit produced, and the launch of its successor, the Frontera.

=== Pre-facelift ===
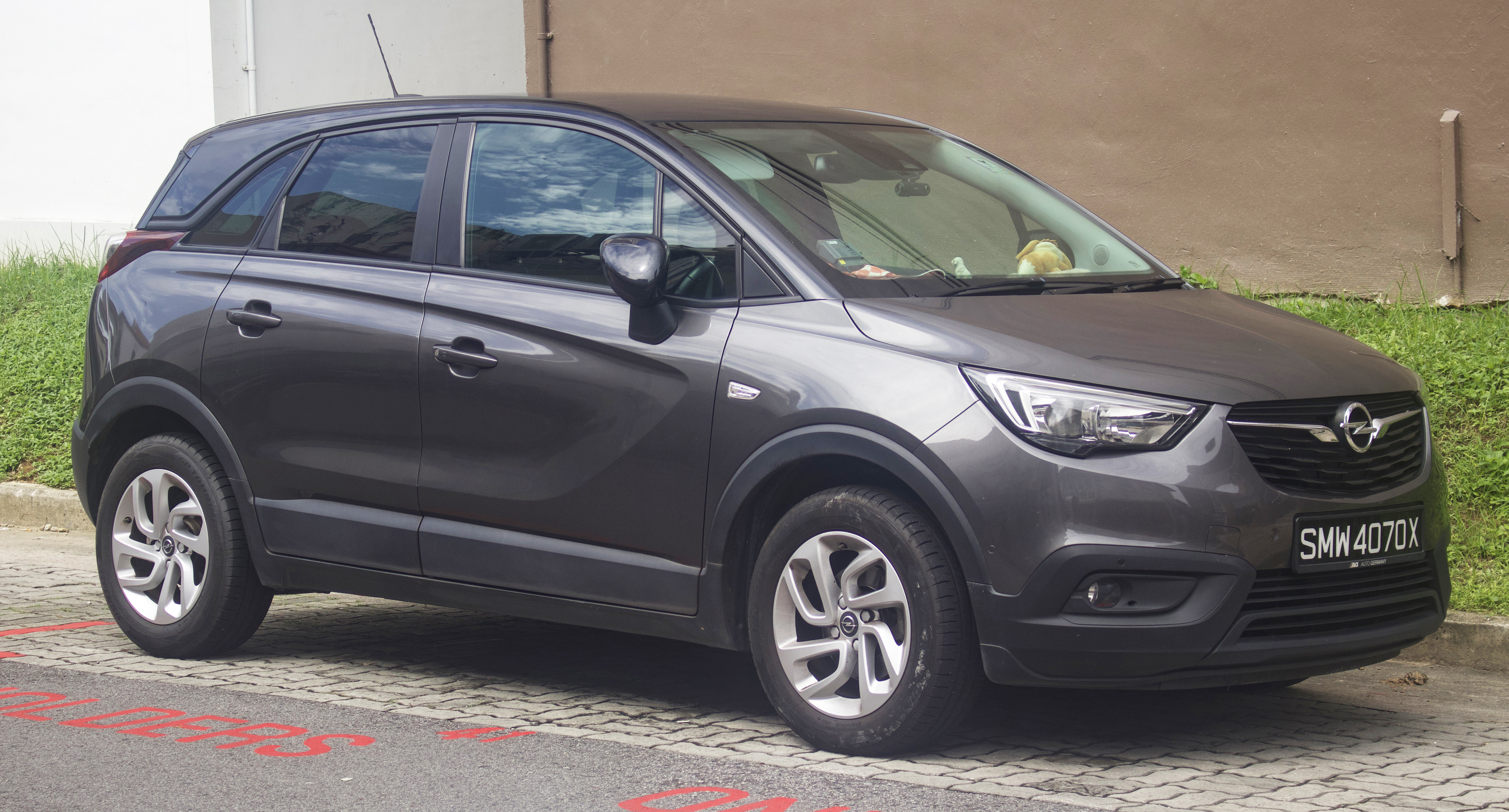
Opel Crossland X (pre-facelift)

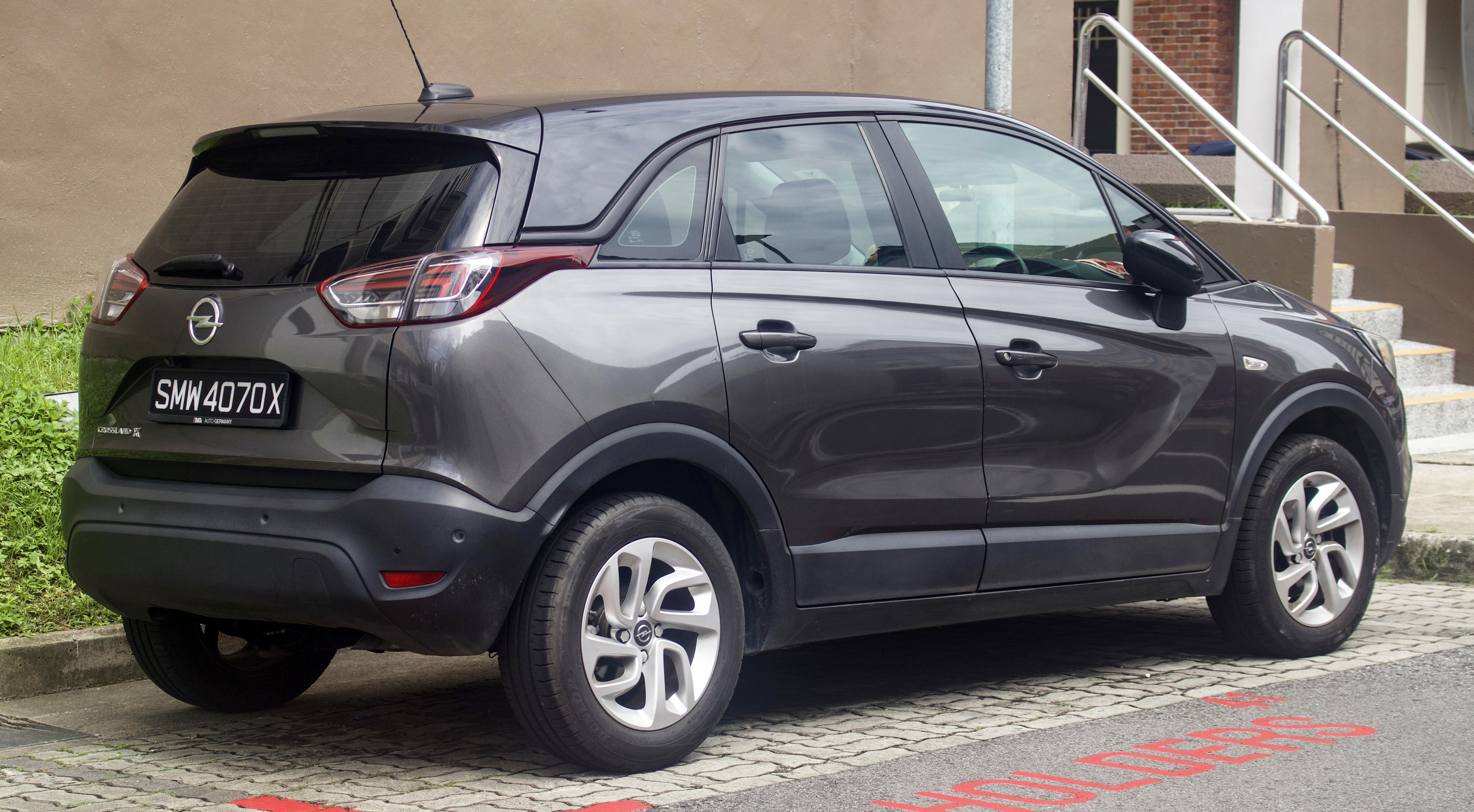
Opel Crossland X (pre-facelift)

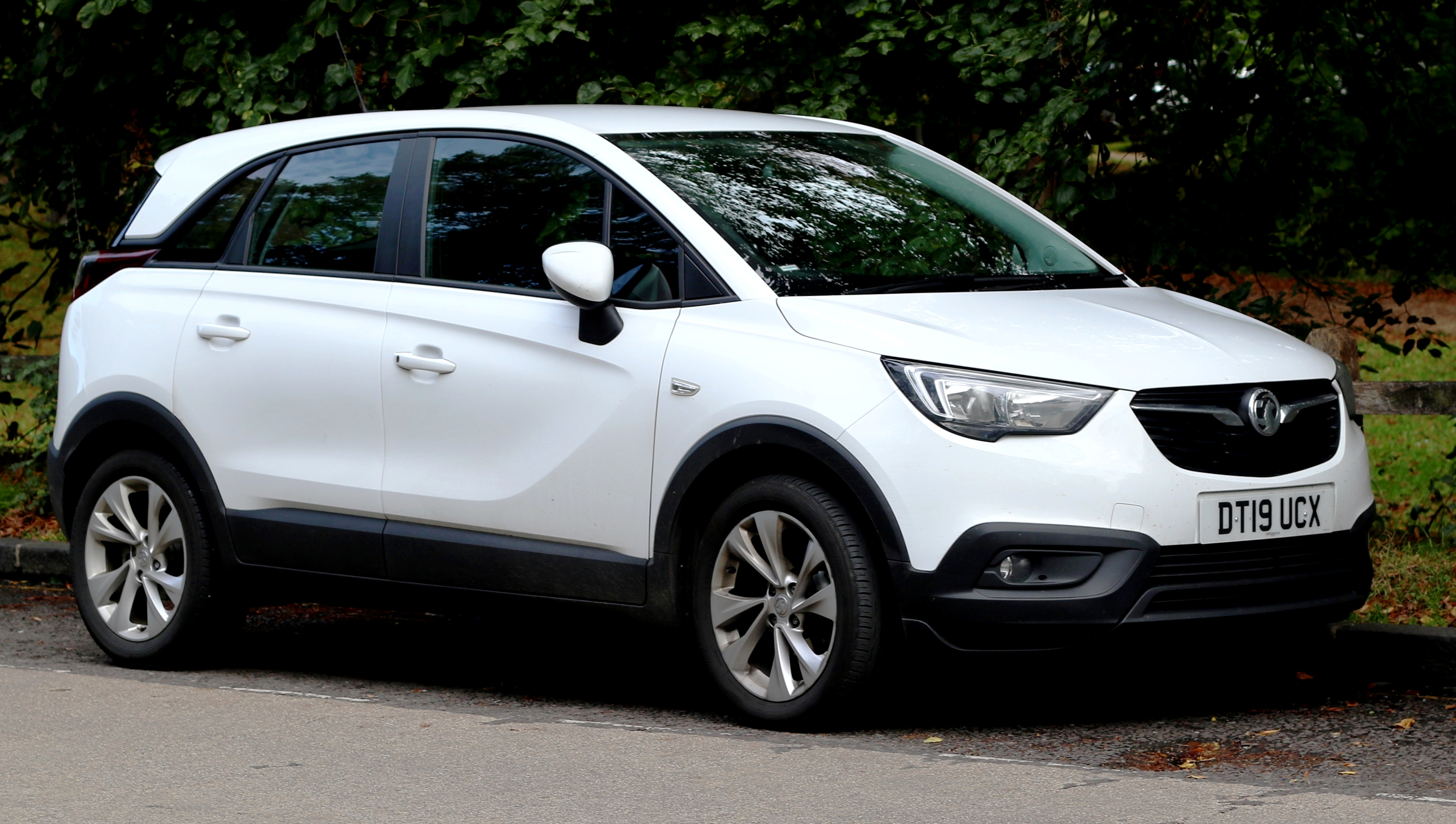
Vauxhall Crossland X (pre-facelift)

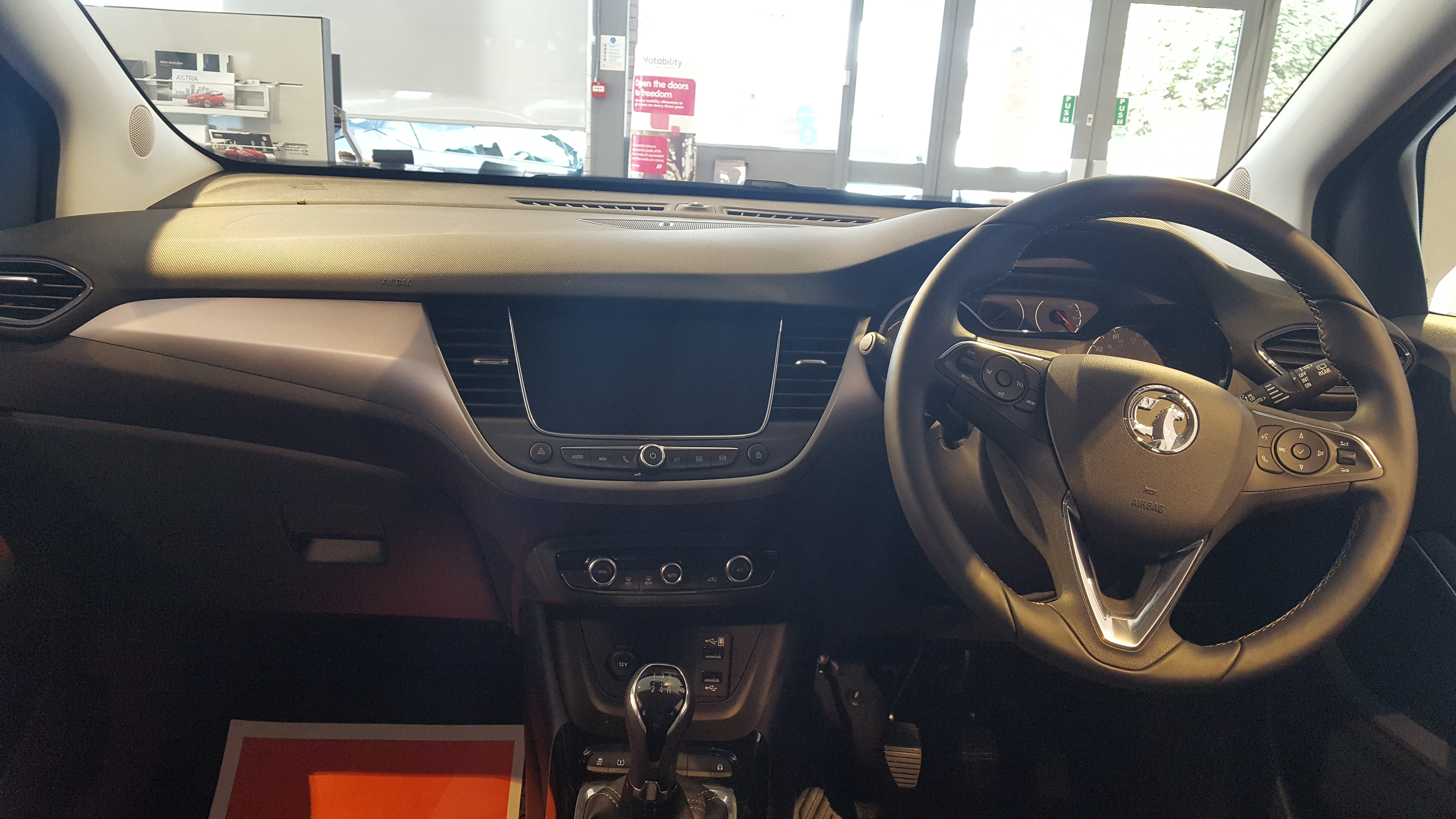
Interior

=== Facelift ===
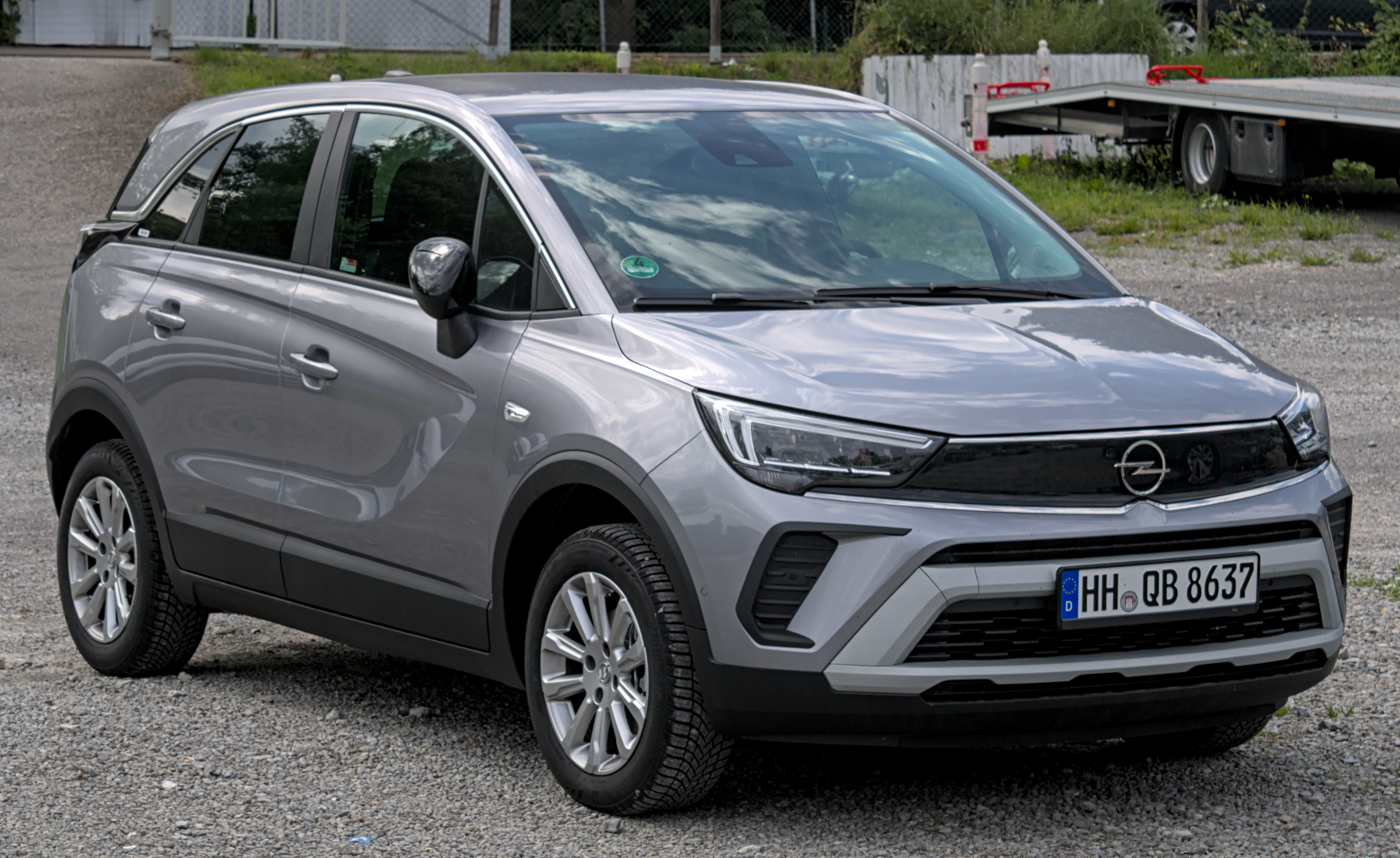
Opel Crossland (facelift)

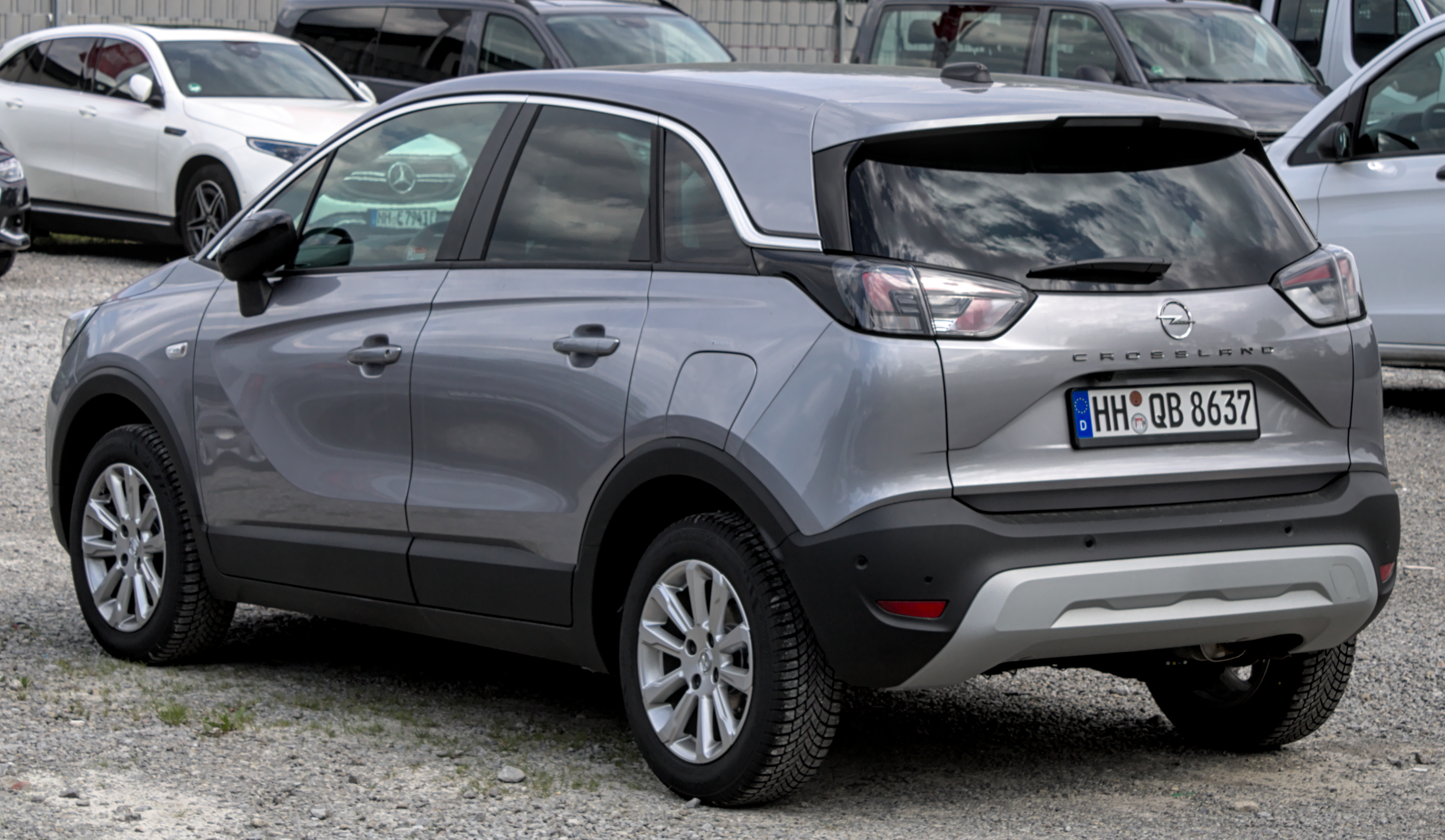
Rear view (facelift)

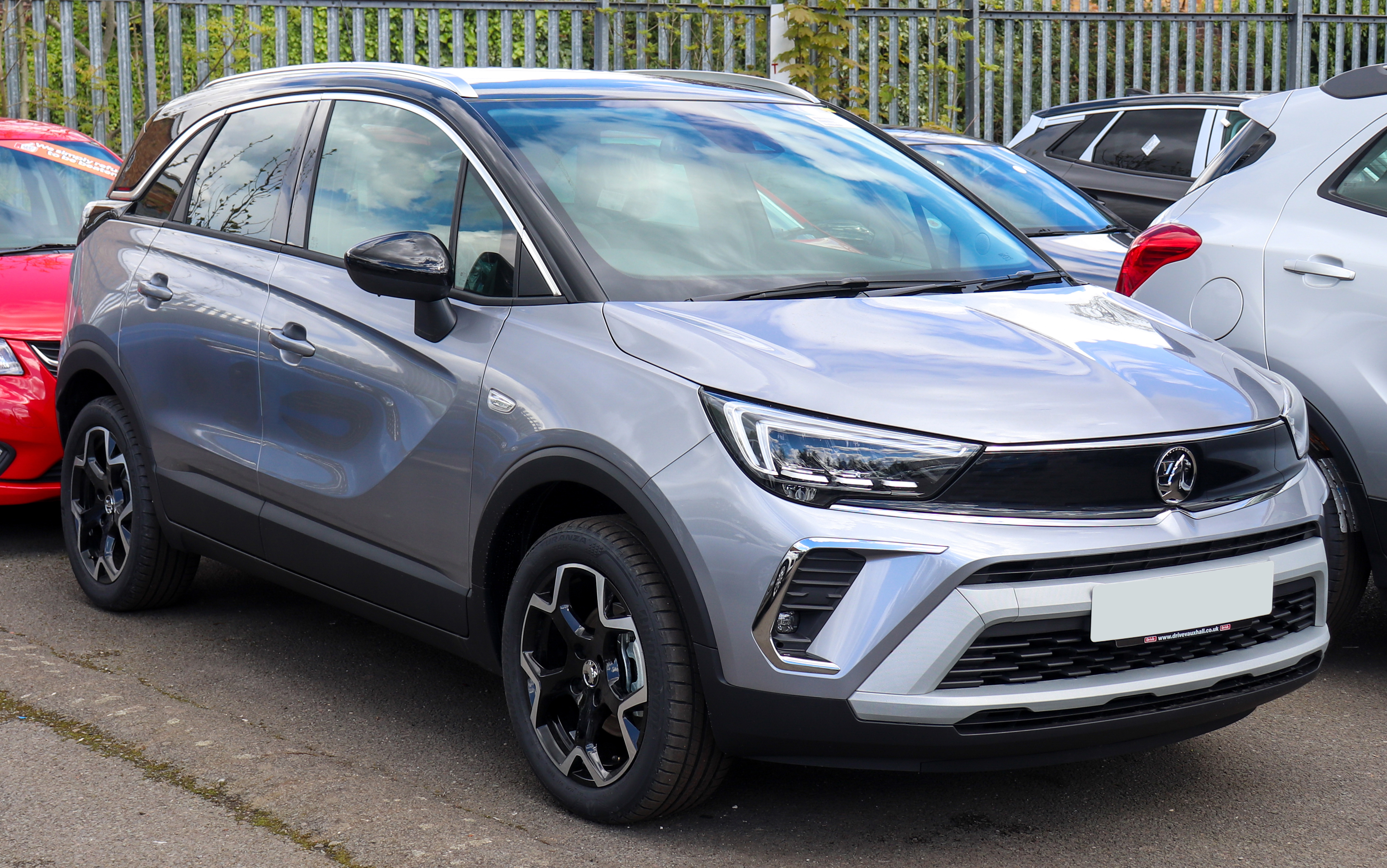
Vauxhall Crossland (facelift)

== Powertrains ==
The Crossland is available with petrol, diesel and LPG engines. The petrol engines are all 1.2-litre three cylinder units, with power outputs of 82, 110 and 130 PS (96 kW). The two higher powered versions are turbocharged, and have balance shafts. On the diesel side, the Crossland offers a 1.6-litre four-cylinder engine with either 99 PS (73 kW) or 120 PS (88 kW). This engine was quickly replaced by a marginally smaller, 1.5-litre version in May 2018, reflecting updates to the Crossland's French-branded sister models.

Both the 120 PS (88 kW) diesel and 130 PS (96 kW) petrol models get a six- speed manual gearbox; the other engines come with five-speed manuals. A six-speed automatic is available, in conjunction with the 130 PS (96 kW) engine. The LPG model is based on the entry level naturally aspirated petrol engine. When operating on LPG, it has a maximum power output of 75 PS (55 kW).

Petrol engines
Model	Engine		Power	Manual transmission	Auto transmission
1.2	EB2F	I3	82 PS (60 kW; 81 hp)	5-speed	—
1.2 Turbo	EB2DT	turbo I3	110 PS (81 kW; 108 hp)	6-speed	6-speed
1.2 Turbo	EB2DTS	turbo I3	130 PS (96 kW; 128 hp)	6-speed	6-speed
Diesel engines
Model	Engine		Power	Manual transmission	Auto transmission
1.5 Diesel	DV5	BlueHDi I4	102 PS (75 kW; 101 hp)	6-speed	—
1.5 Diesel	DV5	BlueHDi I4	110 PS (81 kW; 108 hp)	6-speed	—
1.5 Diesel	DV5	BlueHDi I4	120 PS (88 kW; 118 hp)	—	6-speed
1.6 Diesel	DV6	BlueHDi I4	99 PS (73 kW; 98 hp)	5-speed	—
1.6 Diesel	DV6	BlueHDi I4	120 PS (88 kW; 118 hp)	6-speed	6-speed
LPG engines
Model	Engine		Power	Manual transmission	Auto transmission
1.2	EB2FA	I3	75 PS (55 kW; 74 hp)	5-speed	N/A

== Sales ==
In March 2018, Opel announced that over 100,000 orders for the Crossland or Crossland X had already been taken.

Year	Europe (Note: Europe: 2020 EU 27 + UK + Switzerland + Norway + Iceland)	Turkey
2017	38,964	
2018	95,180	
2019	114,721	
2020	91,411	
2021	80,072	5,437
2022		10,433
2023		13,090
2024		8,270
