= Opel Frontera (2024) =

Subcompact crossover SUV

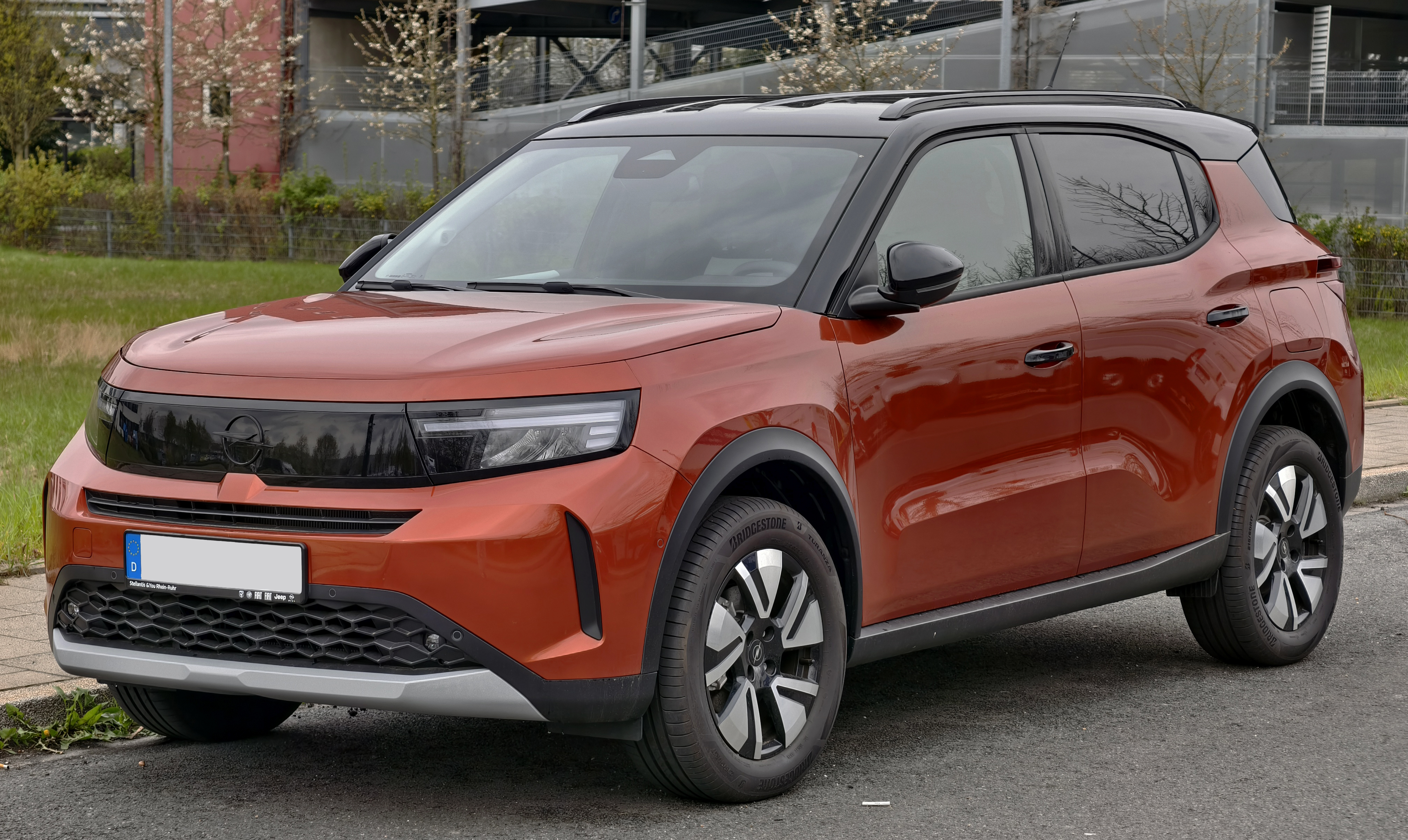
- Opel Frontera Hybrid Ultimate

Overview
- Manufacturer: Opel (Stellantis)
- Model code: OV24
- Also called: Vauxhall Frontera (UK); Opel Crossland (South America)
- Production: 2024–present
- Assembly: Slovakia: Trnava
- Designer: Mark Adams

Body and chassis
- Class: Subcompact crossover SUV (B)
- Body style: 5-door SUV
- Layout: Front-engine, front-wheel-drive; Front-motor, front-wheel-drive (EV)
- Platform: Smart Car Platform
- Related: Citroën C3 (CC21); Citroën C3 Aircross (CC24); Fiat Grande Panda

Powertrain
- Engine: Petrol: 1.2 THP (EB2LTEDH2) I3 turbo (Frontera Start); Petrol hybrid: 1.2 THP (EB2LTEDH2) I3 turbo mild hybrid
- Power output: 100–136 PS (99–134 hp; 74–100 kW) (petrol); 113 PS (111 hp; 83 kW) (EV)
- Transmission: 6-speed e-DCT
- Hybrid drivetrain: Mild hybrid
- Battery: 44.2 kWh lithium-ion
- Plug-in charging: 7.4 kW (AC); 100 kW (DC)

Dimensions
- Wheelbase: 2,670 mm (105.1 in)
- Length: 4,385 mm (172.6 in)
- Width: 1,795 mm (70.7 in)
- Height: 1,635–1,655 mm (64.4–65.2 in)
- Curb weight: 1,344–1,514 kg (2,963–3,338 lb)

Chronology
- Predecessor: Opel Crossland

The Opel Frontera, also marketed as the Vauxhall Frontera in the UK, is a subcompact crossover SUV (B-segment) produced by Opel since 2024. The Frontera replaced the Opel/Vauxhall Crossland, and is a sister model to the second-generation Citroën C3 Aircross. It is available as a petrol mild hybrid vehicle or as a battery electric vehicle.

The model reuses the nameplate from a previous SUV model sold by Opel that was produced between 1991 and 2004.

== Overview ==
Opel decided to simplify the trim structure to two levels: Frontera and Frontera GS, with each trim can be paired with two option packages. Opel announced a 7-seater version will be available at a later date.

The exterior features Opel's new Blitz logo on the Visor front fascia integrates the ECO LED headlights, a distinctive C-Pillar design, pronounced wheel arches and fenders, and rear taillights separated by body coloured inserts.

The interior features the Pure Panel cockpit with two 10-inch displays for the driver's instrument cluster and touchscreen infotainment system, a standard 'smartphone station’ via a dedicated smartphone app, patented Intelli-Seat feature in the front seats, and seat fabrics that use fully sustainable recycled materials.

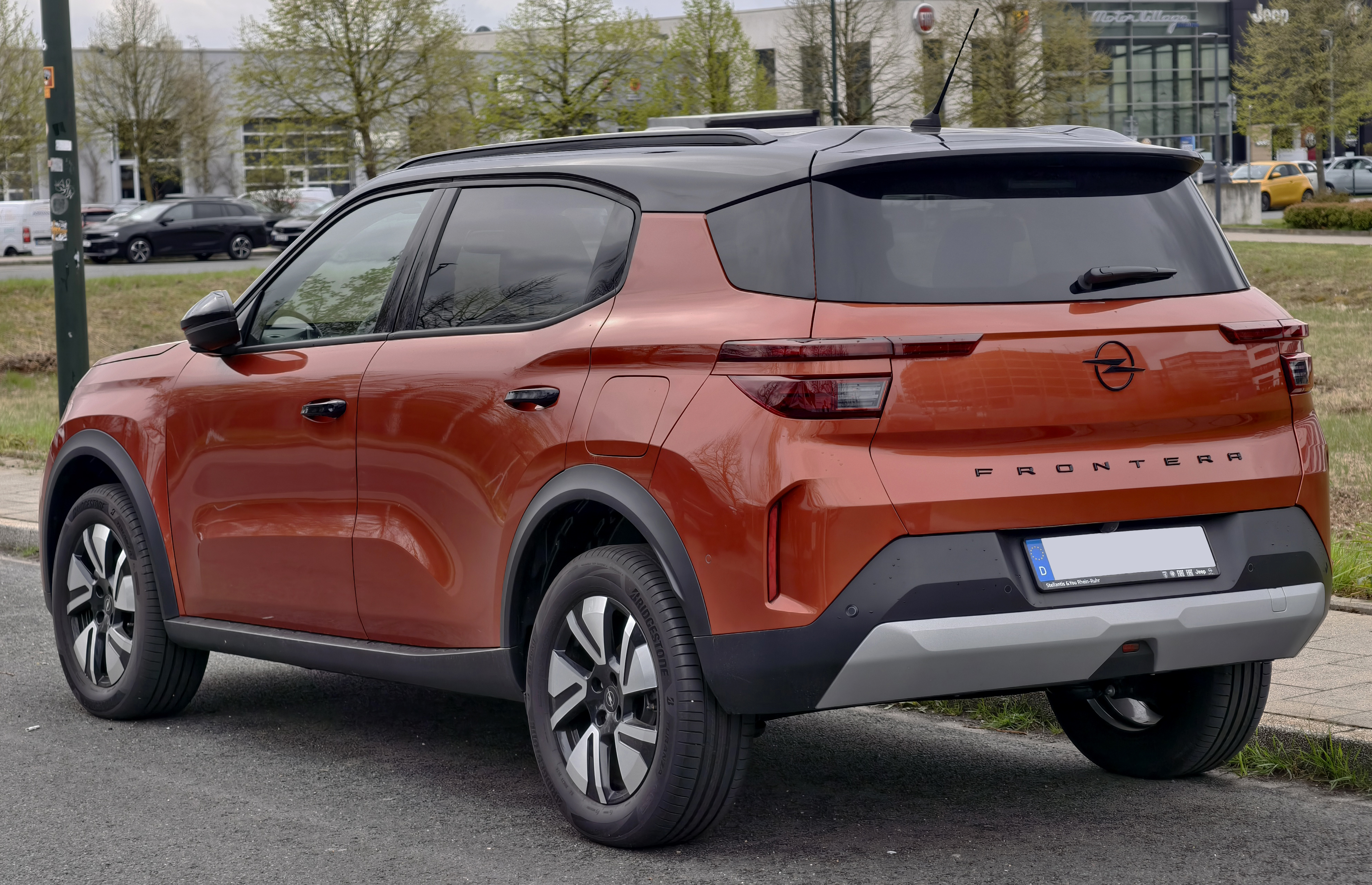
Rear view

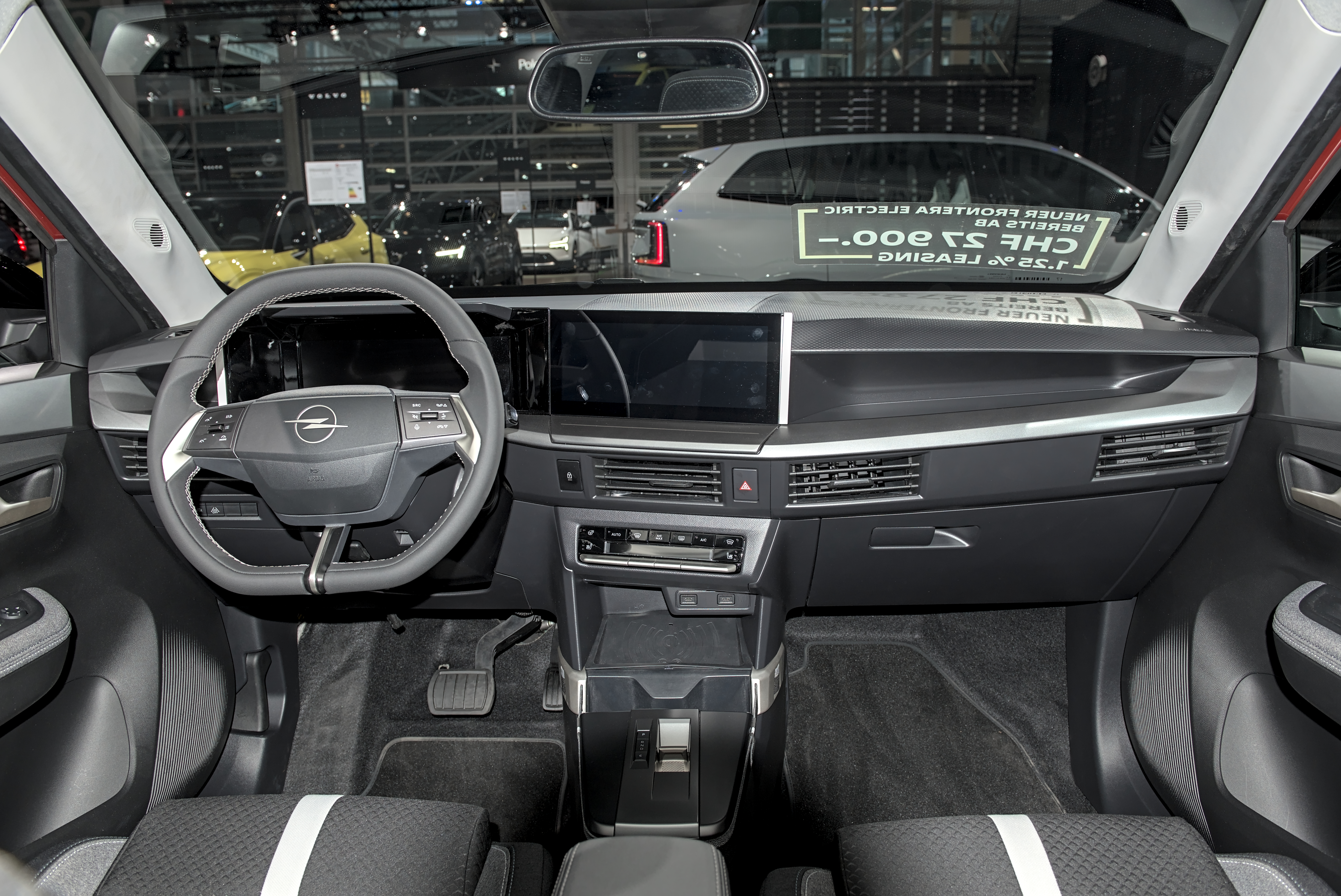
Interior

== Sales ==
| Year | Europe (Note: Europe: 2020 EU 27 + UK + Switzerland + Norway + Iceland) | Turkey |
|---|---|---|
| 2025 | | 10,200 |
