= Citroën Oli =

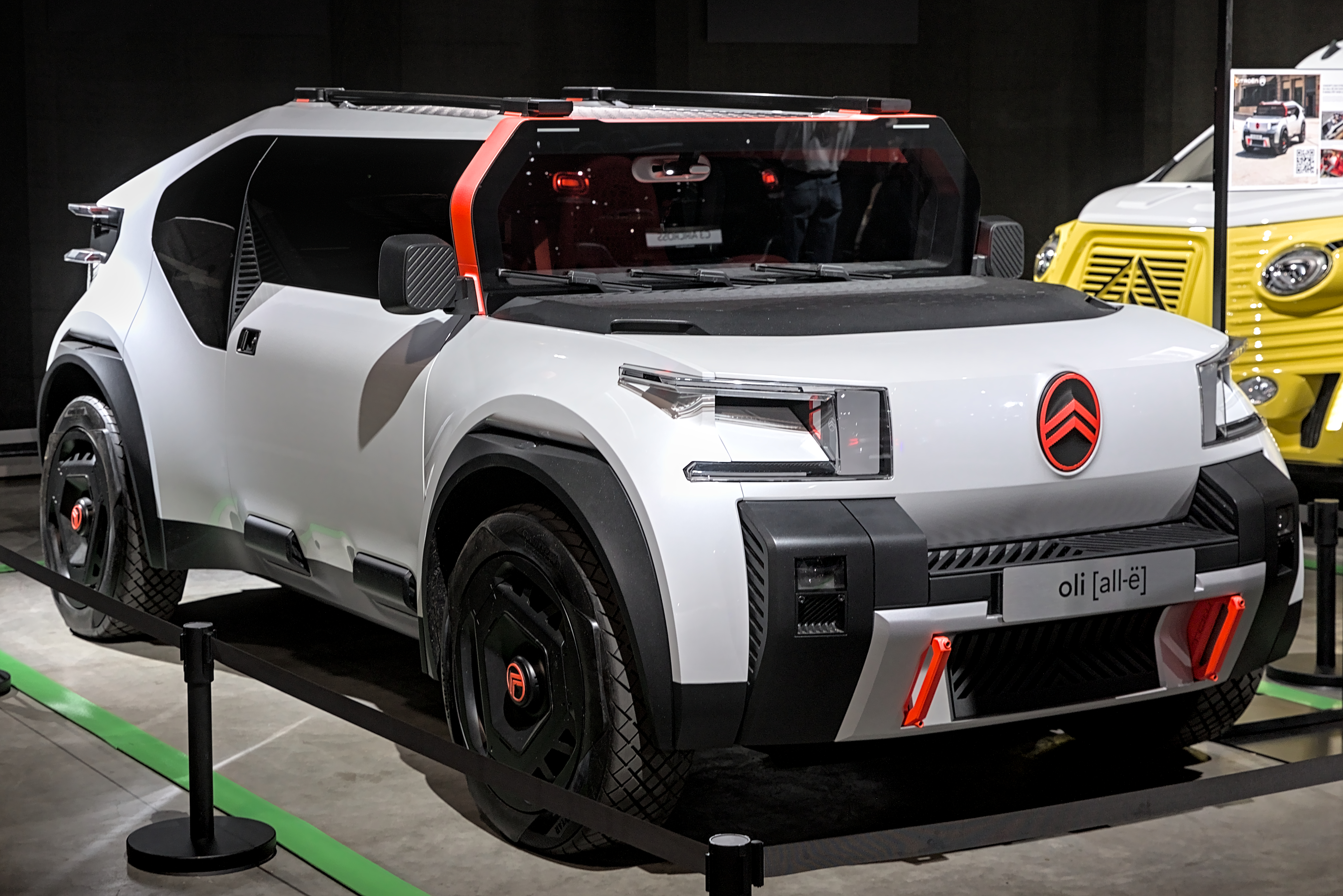
- Citroën Oli at Rétromobile 2023

Overview
- Manufacturer: Citroën
- Designer: Raphaël Doukhan (exterior)

Body and chassis
- Class: Concept car
- Body style: hatchback
- Layout: Rear-motor, rear-wheel-drive

Powertrain
- Battery: 40 kWh Li-ion

Dimensions
- Length: 4,200 mm (165.4 in)
- Width: 1,900 mm (74.8 in)
- Height: 1,650 mm (65.0 in)
- Curb weight: 1,000 kg (2,205 lb)

The Citroën Oli (pronounced “all-E” and stylized as oli [all-ë]) is an all-electric pickup concept that was unveiled on September 29, 2022. Before that, it was announced through a teaser image on September 27, 2022, and it will introduce the brand's new identity and logo, which is a reinterpretation of the original from 1919.

The double chevron oval badge debuted on this concept and will be phased in on future production models starting from mid-2023.

== Overview ==
Even though it won't spawn a production version, the French company says the "ideas, design details and interior advances" from this concept should appear on future production models.

== Gallery ==
The new Citroën logo that debuted on this concept

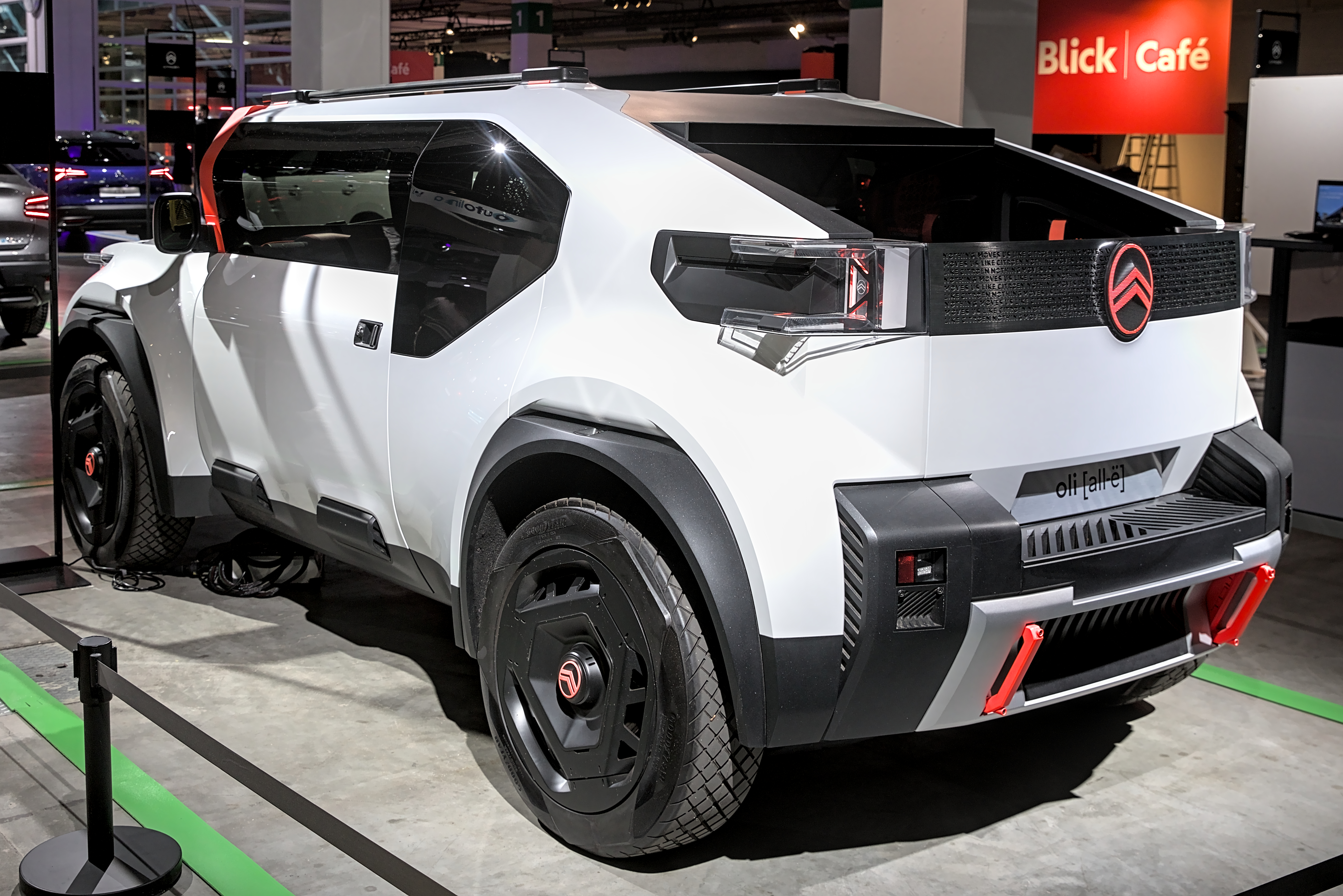
Rear ¾ view
