= Citroën C3 =

Subcompact car produced by Citroën

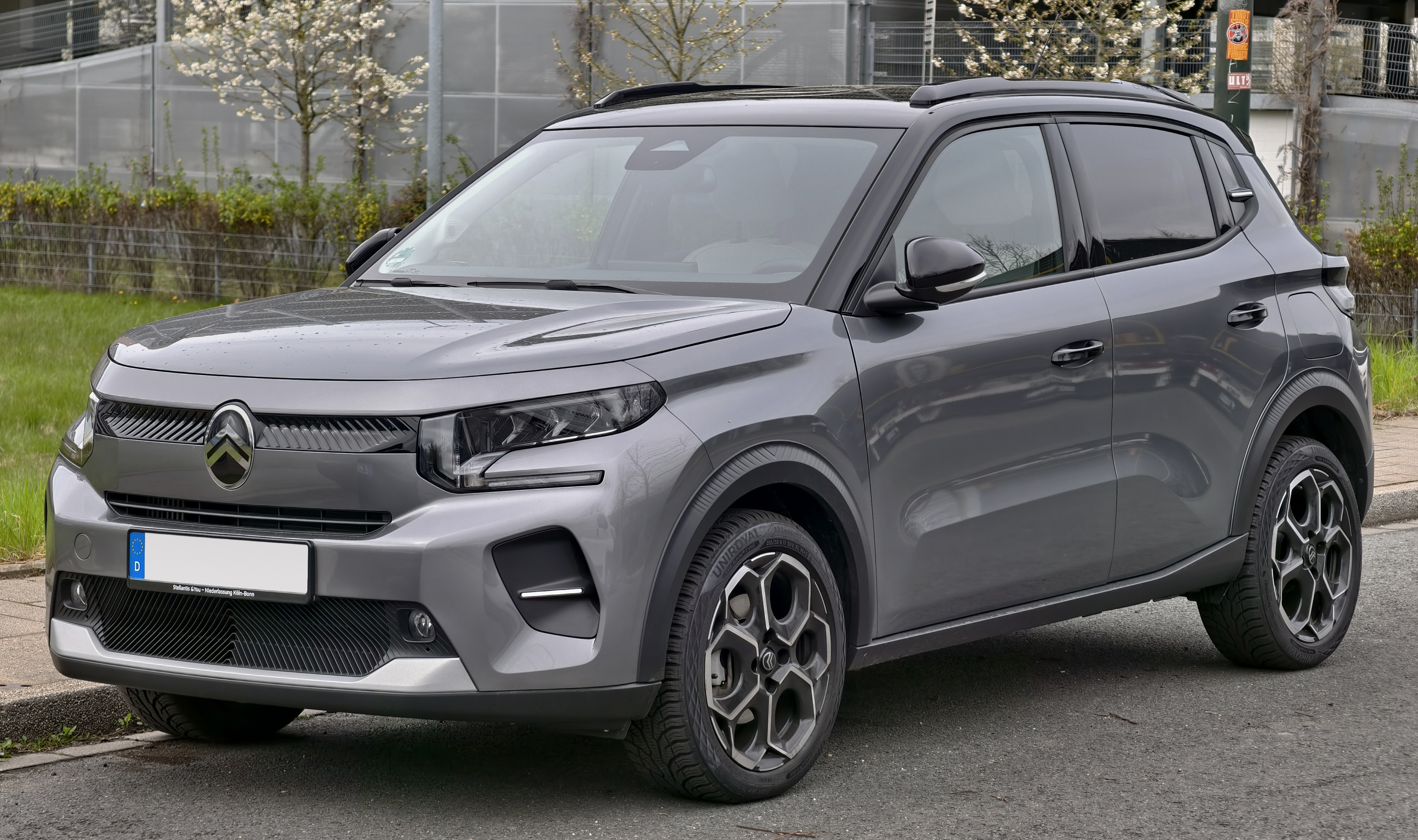
- Citroën C3 IV

Overview
- Manufacturer: Citroën (Note: PSA Group (2002–2021); Stellantis (2021–present))
- Production: April 2002 – present

Body and chassis
- Class: Supermini (B)
- Body style: 5-door hatchback 2-door coupé-cabriolet (2003–2010)
- Layout: Front-engine, front-wheel-drive

Chronology
- Predecessor: Citroën Saxo; Citroën C2

The Citroën C3 is a supermini car (B-segment) produced by Citroën since April 2002. It replaced the Citroën Saxo in the model line up, and is currently in its fourth generation. Initial models of the Citroën C3 were built using the same platform as the Peugeot 206.

The C3 is produced in a five-door hatchback body style, with the first generation also being produced in a two-door convertible version, called the C3 Pluriel. A three-door hatchback, with a similar design as the second generation, was available as the Citroën DS3 and marketed as a premium model.

A mini MPV derivative of the C3 was announced in July 2008, called the C3 Picasso. In South America, a mini SUV version called the C3 Aircross, was produced and marketed only locally. Then, a separate model also called the Citroën C3 Aircross was introduced worldwide.

In September 2021, a new, low-cost model was introduced for the Indian and South American markets. During its introduction, Citroën CEO Vincent Cobée mentioned that the "C3" is the trade name for all Citroën B-segment hatchbacks around the world. The third and fourth-generation C3 are available with a battery electric variant.

== First generation (FC/FN; 2002) ==
First generation
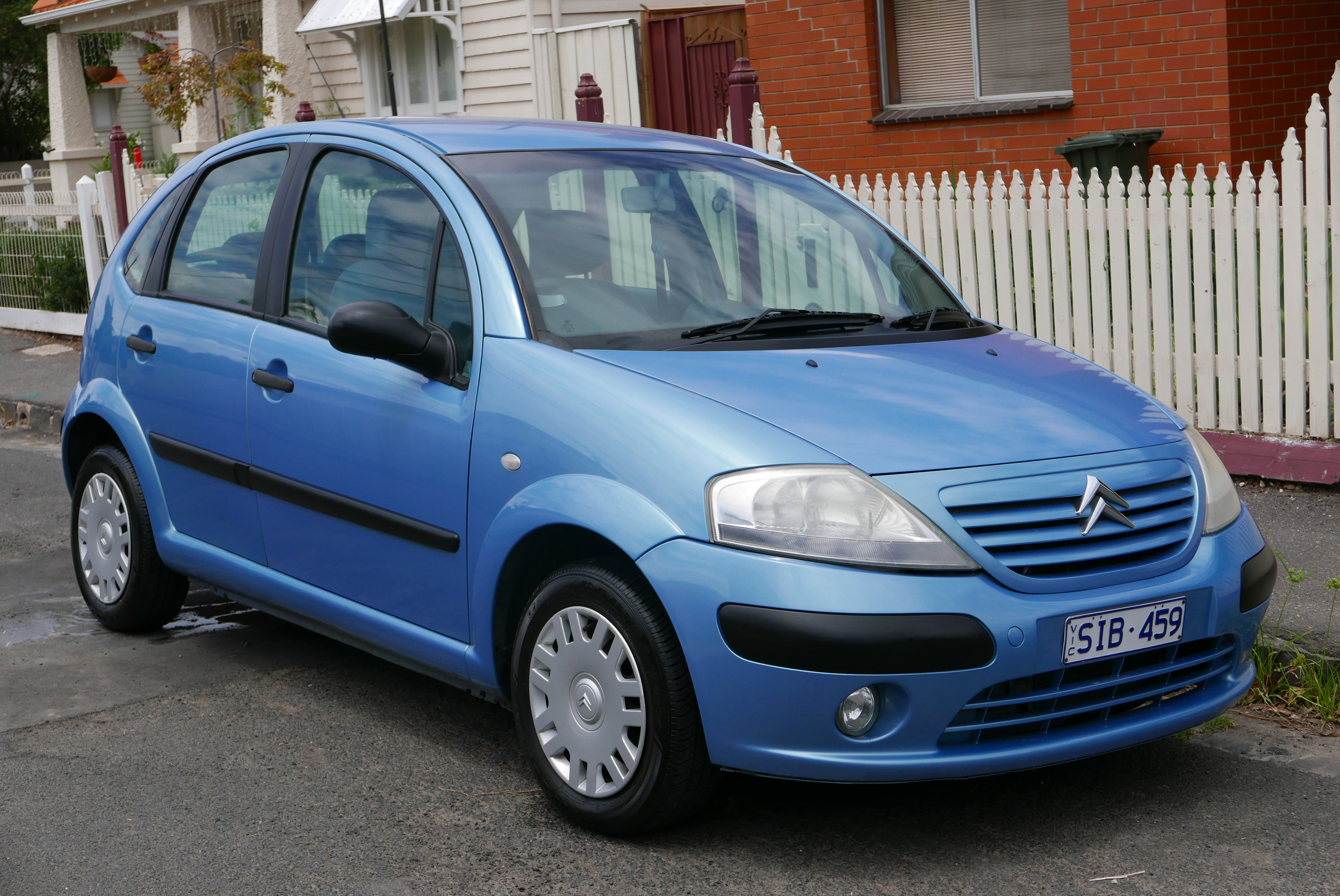
- Pre-facelift Citroën C3 hatchback

Overview
- Model code: FC/FN
- Production: 2002–2010; 2003–2012 (Brazil)
- Assembly: France: Aulnay-sous-Bois; Spain: Villaverde (Madrid); Brazil: Porto Real (PSA Brasil); Uruguay: Barra de Carrasco (Oferol)
- Designer: Donato Coco; Jean-Pierre Ploué

Body and chassis
- Body style: 5-door hatchback 2-door convertible
- Platform: PSA PF1 platform
- Related: Citroën C2; Peugeot 1007; Peugeot 206

Powertrain
- Engine: Petrol: 1.1 L TU1 I4; 1.4 L TU3 I4; 1.4 L ET3 I4; 1.6 L TU5 I4; Diesel: 1.4 L DV4 I4; 1.6 L DV6 I4
- Transmission: 5-speed manual 5-speed SensoDrive automated manual 4-speed automatic

Dimensions
- Wheelbase: 2,460 mm (96.9 in)
- Length: 3,850 mm (151.6 in) (hatchback); 3,934 mm (154.9 in) (convertible)
- Width: 1,670 mm (65.7 in) (hatchback); 1,700 mm (66.9 in) (convertible)
- Height: 1,490 mm (58.7 in)
- Curb weight: 953–1,050 kg (2,101–2,315 lb)

Chronology
- Successor: Citroën DS3 Cabrio (for C3 Pluriel); Citroën E-Méhari (as a convertible)

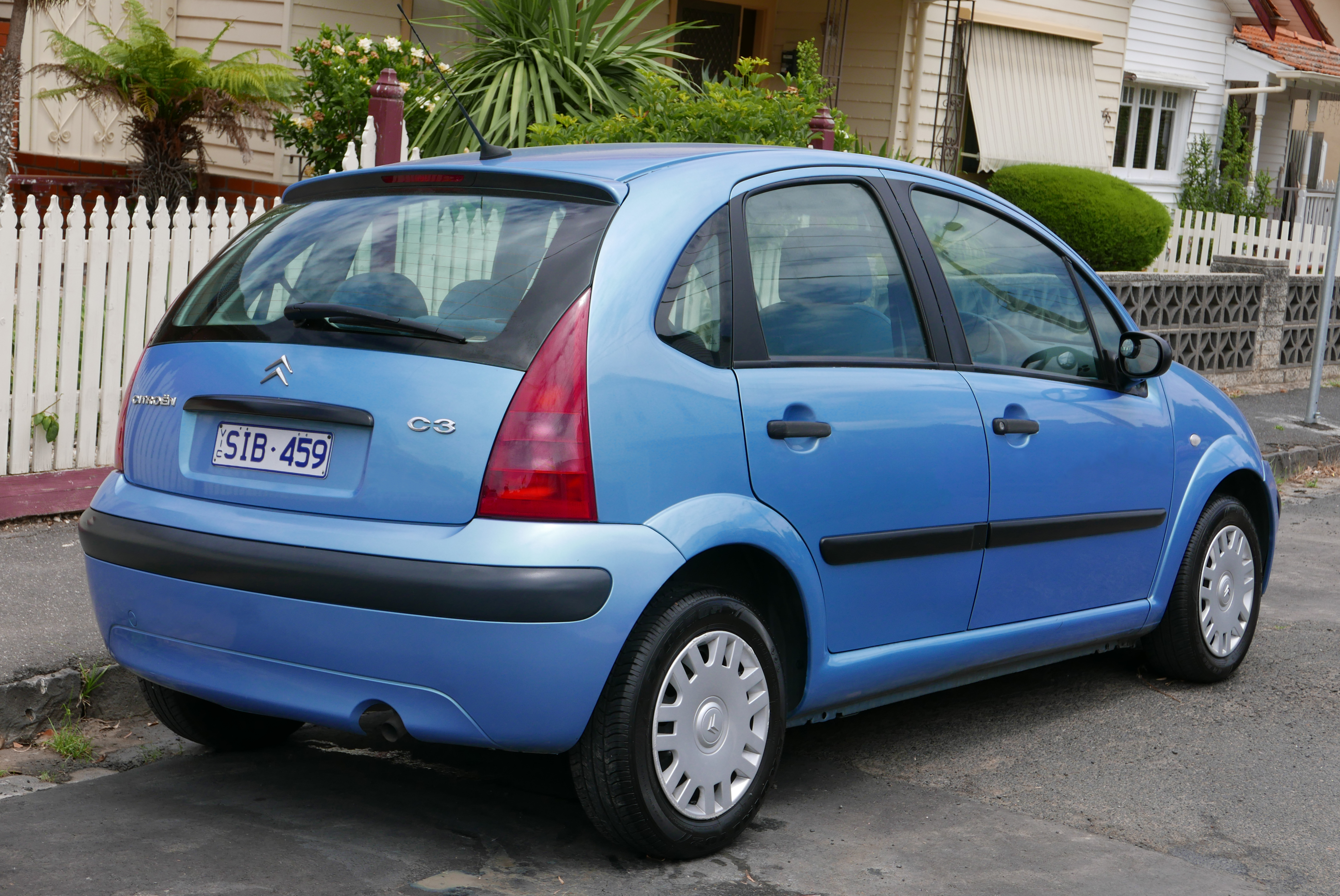
Pre-facelift Citroën C3 hatchback

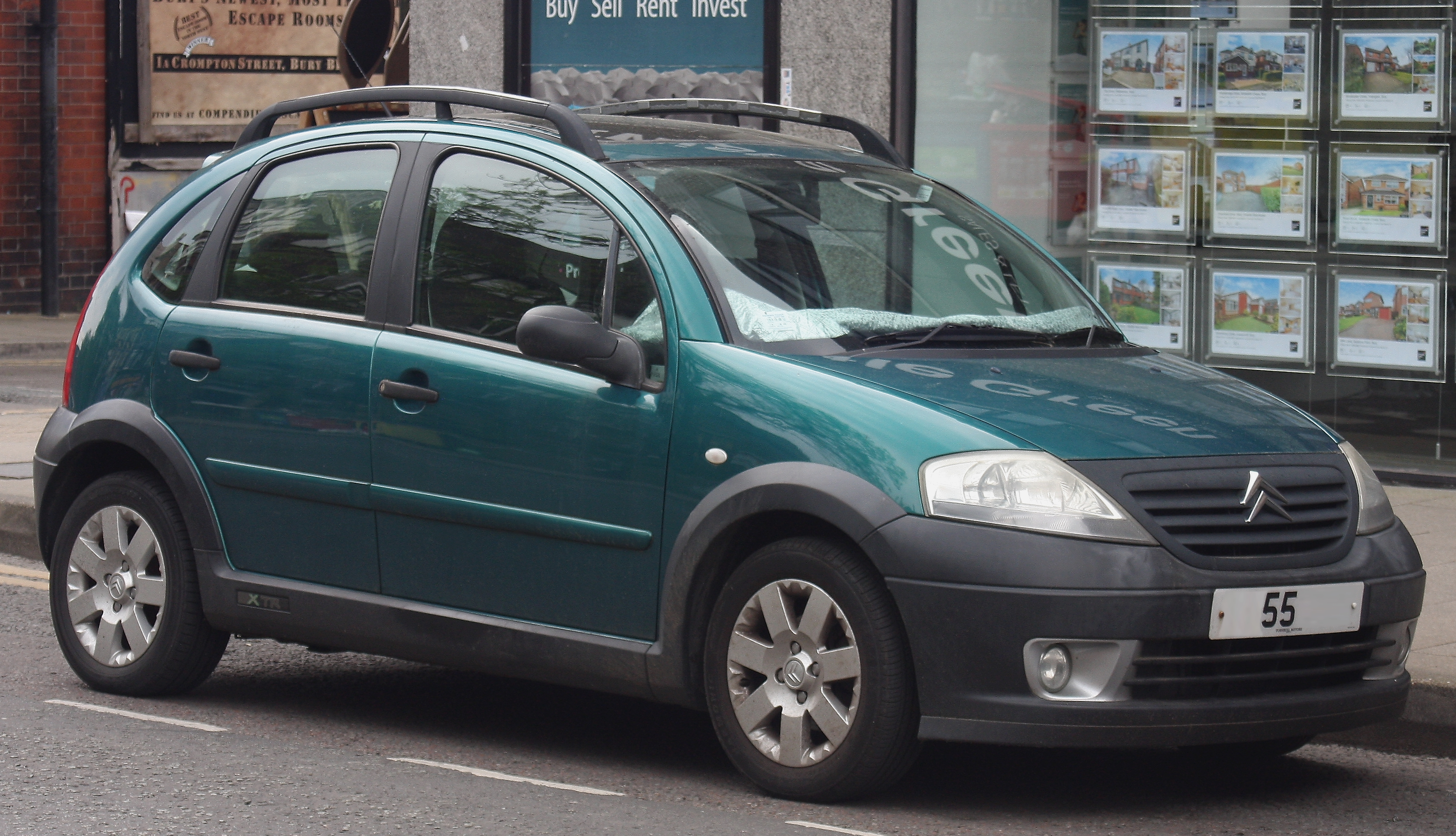
Pre-facelift Citroën C3 X-TR, European version

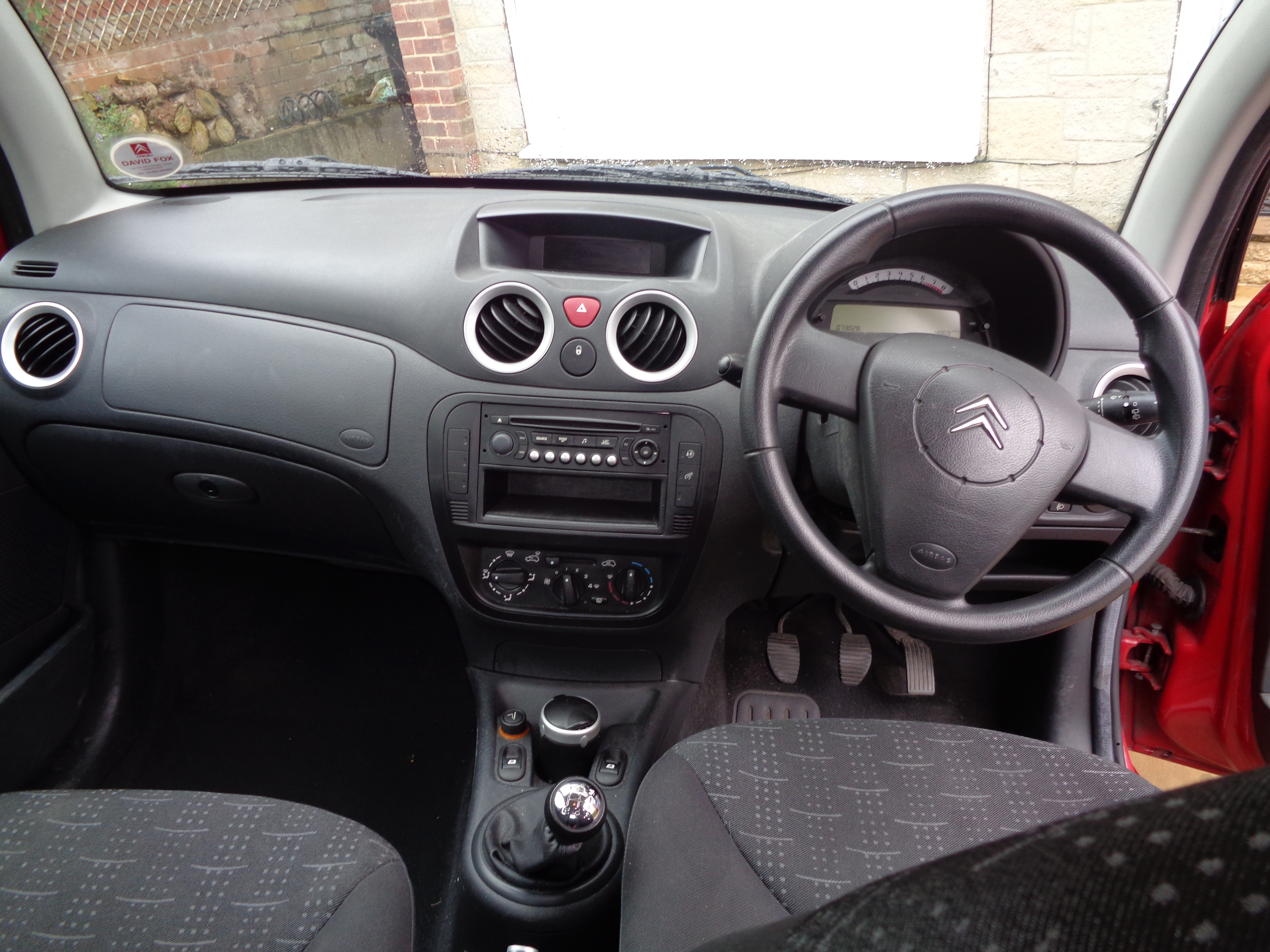
Interior

After Jean-Pierre Ploué was appointed Director of the Citroën Design Center in 2000, he designed the C3 under the leadership of Donato Coco, who was already responsible for the Citroën Xsara Picasso.

The first generation of the C3 was launched at the 2001 Frankfurt Motor Show, as well as the 2001 Bologna Motor Show, and began marketing in January 2002, as a five-door hatchback. It was available with 1.1, 1.4 and 1.6 litre petrol engines, and 1.4 and 1.6 litre common rail diesel engines.

All models came as standard with a five speed manual transmission, except for the Stop & Start model, which came with the SensoDrive gearbox, a five-speed automated manual transmission with paddle-shifters and manual and automatic modes. The top level was the only version that had the option of a four-speed hydraulic automatic transmission.

In accordance with the PSA Group policy, the C3's chassis was used for the Peugeot 1007 and the Peugeot 207. Many components of the C3 are the same as those of the Peugeot 206. Some versions of the C3 feature a start-stop system that can automatically cut the engine when not needed to save fuel, such as in traffic, and restart it briskly to move on again.

An offroad-looking model called C3 X-TR was marketed from 2005 to 2009.

=== Citroën C3 Lumiere ===
The Citroën C3 Lumiere was a concept car that previewed the production Citroën C3, it was initially released in 1998 as a five-door hatchback, with four seats and rear suicide doors for easy access for passengers to the rear seats. It featured a five-speed manual transmission, and a 1.1 L TU1 I4 petrol engine upfront.

=== Facelift ===
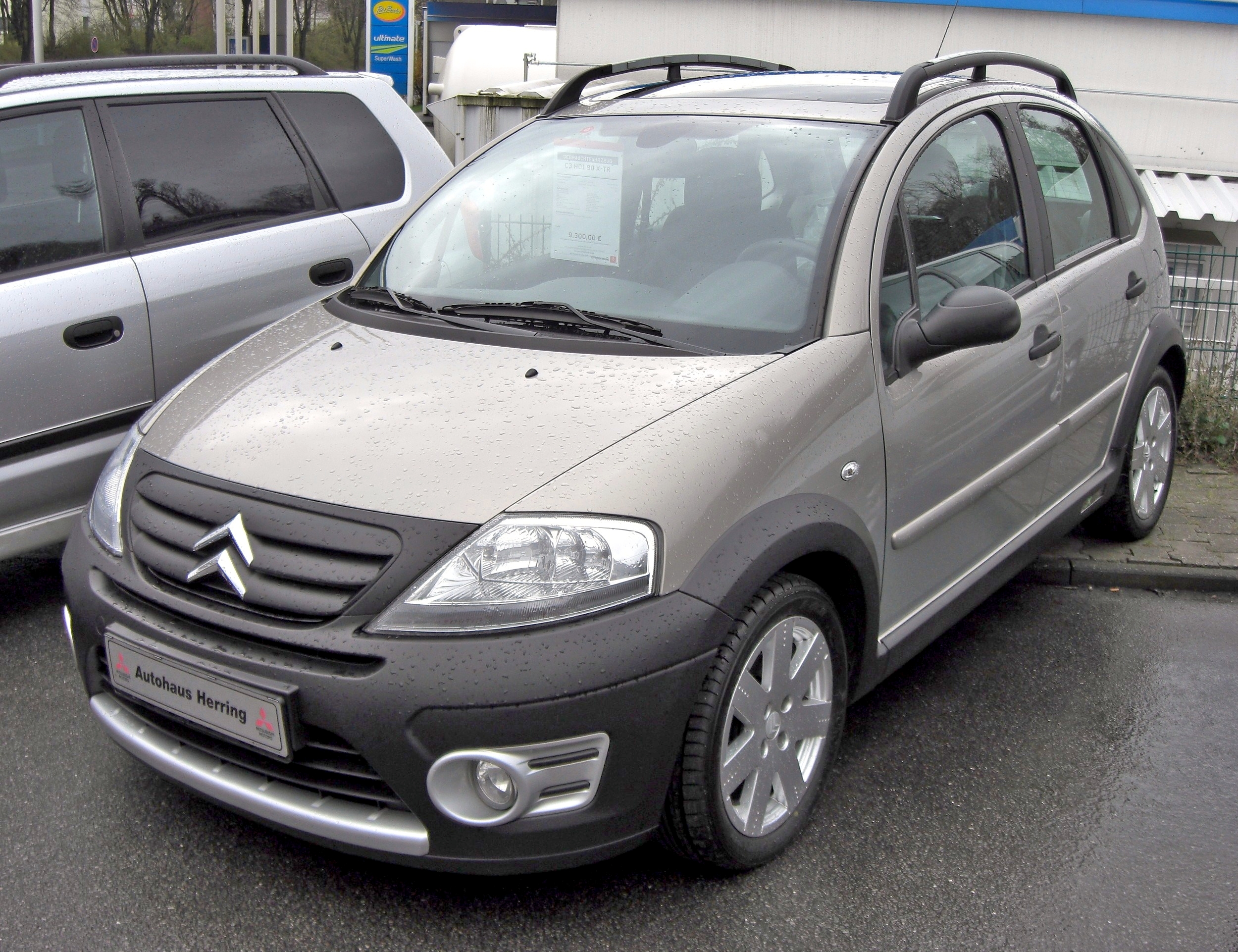
Facelift Citroën C3 X-TR

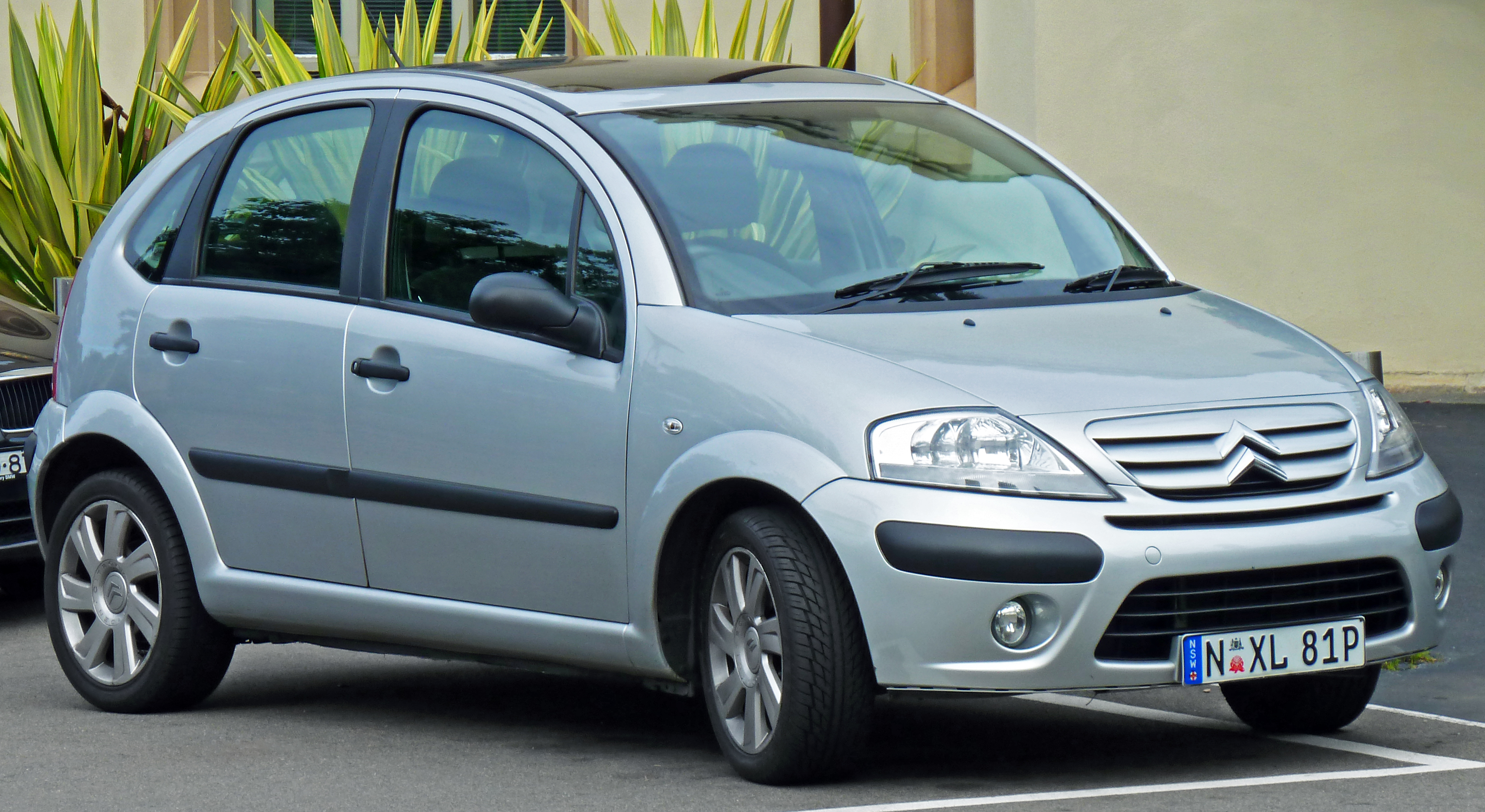
Facelift Citroën C3 hatchback

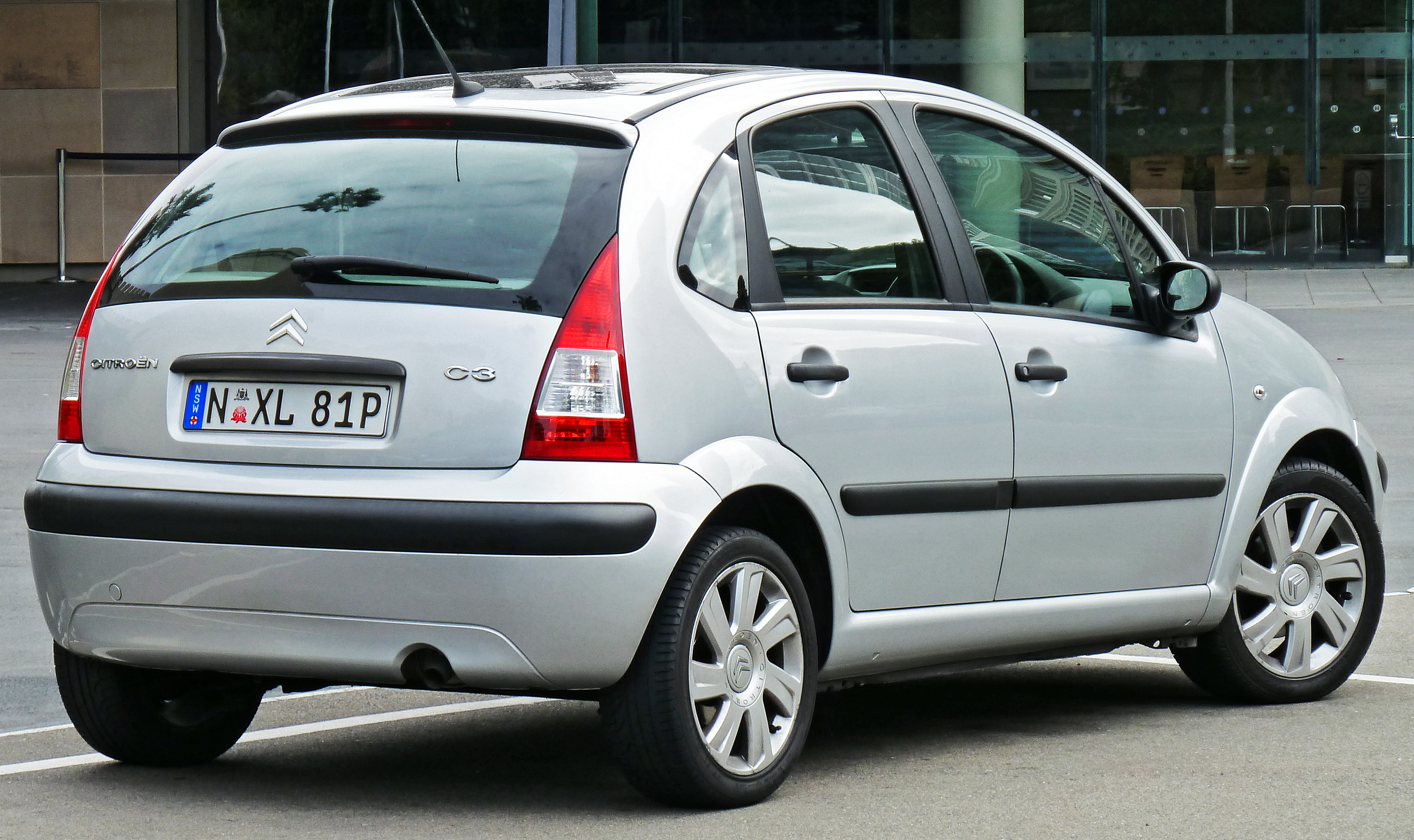
Facelift Citroën C3 hatchback

The C3 was given a redesign in October 2005, with the front end featuring a more imposing bumper, wider lower air intake, single air intake slit below the restyled radiator grille, and a repositioned number plate. The rear of the car was also given redesigned light clusters, with crystal coloured midsections.

The passenger compartment was also enhanced, with the fitting of a restyled dashboard with a high-quality finish, as well as a newer, more modern instrument cluster making the driver information easier to read.

The addition of light metallic grey embellishers around the central section of the fascia and air vents contributed to the updated interior, as did the completely redesigned front and rear door panels and trims. The steering was also improved so that it stiffens up with speed. Citroën also added a new 1.6 L 16 valve HDi diesel engine to the range, rated at 81 kW (110 PS). The Pluriel also received similar interior alterations but was otherwise unchanged.

As with the Peugeot 206+ and Renault Clio Campus, Citroën didn't yet end the original C3 despite the new generation arrival. It stayed offered on selected European markets. During Autumn 2009, the brand announces the first-gen C3 will be marketed under a new name : Citroën C3 Génération. However, a few weeks later, the name is changed to Citroën C3 Classic. This name is used in France but also in other countries like Greece or Italy. Various names are used across Europe like C3 Hit Classic (Belgium), C3 First (UK, Germany) or C3 First+ (Switzerland). The first-gen C3 was manufactured in Spain until 2010, in France until mid-2011 and sold across Europe until February 2011.

The South-American model was manufactured and sold until 2012.

=== C3 Pluriel ===
Citroën marketed the C3 Pluriel from 2003 to 2010 as a convertible with five open top variations, hence the name, which derives from the French word for "plural." The name Pluriel is related to the English word plural. This model was developed as a turnkey project by Italdesign. It was exclusively assembled in Spain.

The Pluriel can be configured as a hatchback with a multi-layer insulated top; a full-length landaulet, operable partially or to the back window or any stage in between, with a buffet minimizing wind deflector over the windshield; a fixed profile convertible, with the roof open to the back window, the roof assembly folds into a well in the trunk floor; a full convertible where roof side rails are unlatched and removed. and as a roadster pick up, where the back seats fold to a pickup like bed with a drop-down tailgate. The roof tended to let in water.

The C3 Pluriel was introduced in July 2003, and was originally offered with a choice of a 1.4 or a 1.6 L petrol engine, and a 1.4 L diesel engine. The 1.6 L petrol came fitted, as standard, with an automated manual gearbox. The Pluriel was withdrawn in July 2010.

Roof operation became a point of criticism, with operation as a convertible requiring the roof rails be left behind with out foul weather recourse. The Pluriel was criticized for its roof design on the Top Gear special The Worst Car in the History of the World. In October 2013, Top Gear Magazine placed the C3 Pluriel on its list of "The 13 worst cars of the last 20 years", describing the car as "useful as a chocolate teapot."

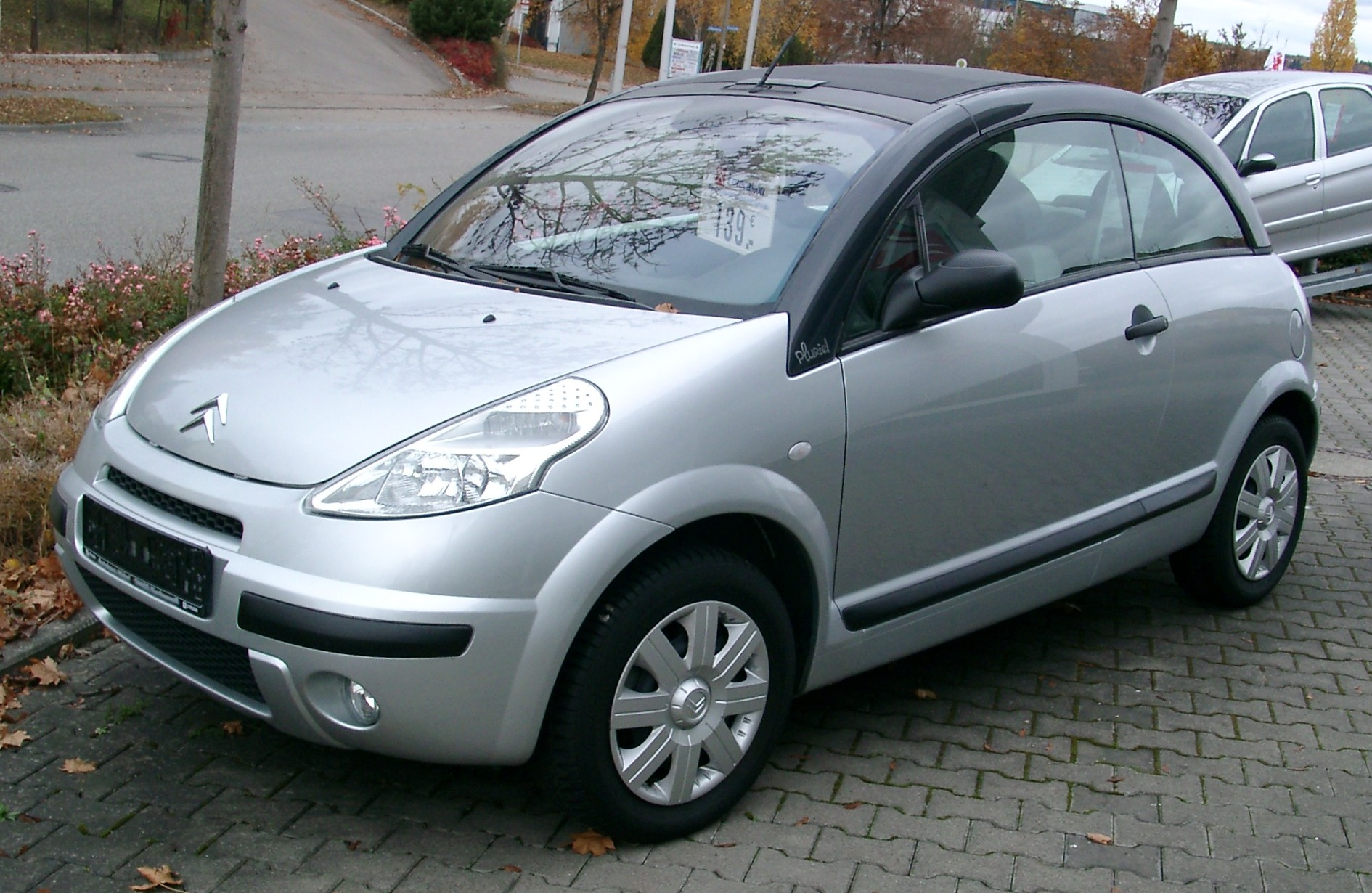
Citroën C3 Pluriel

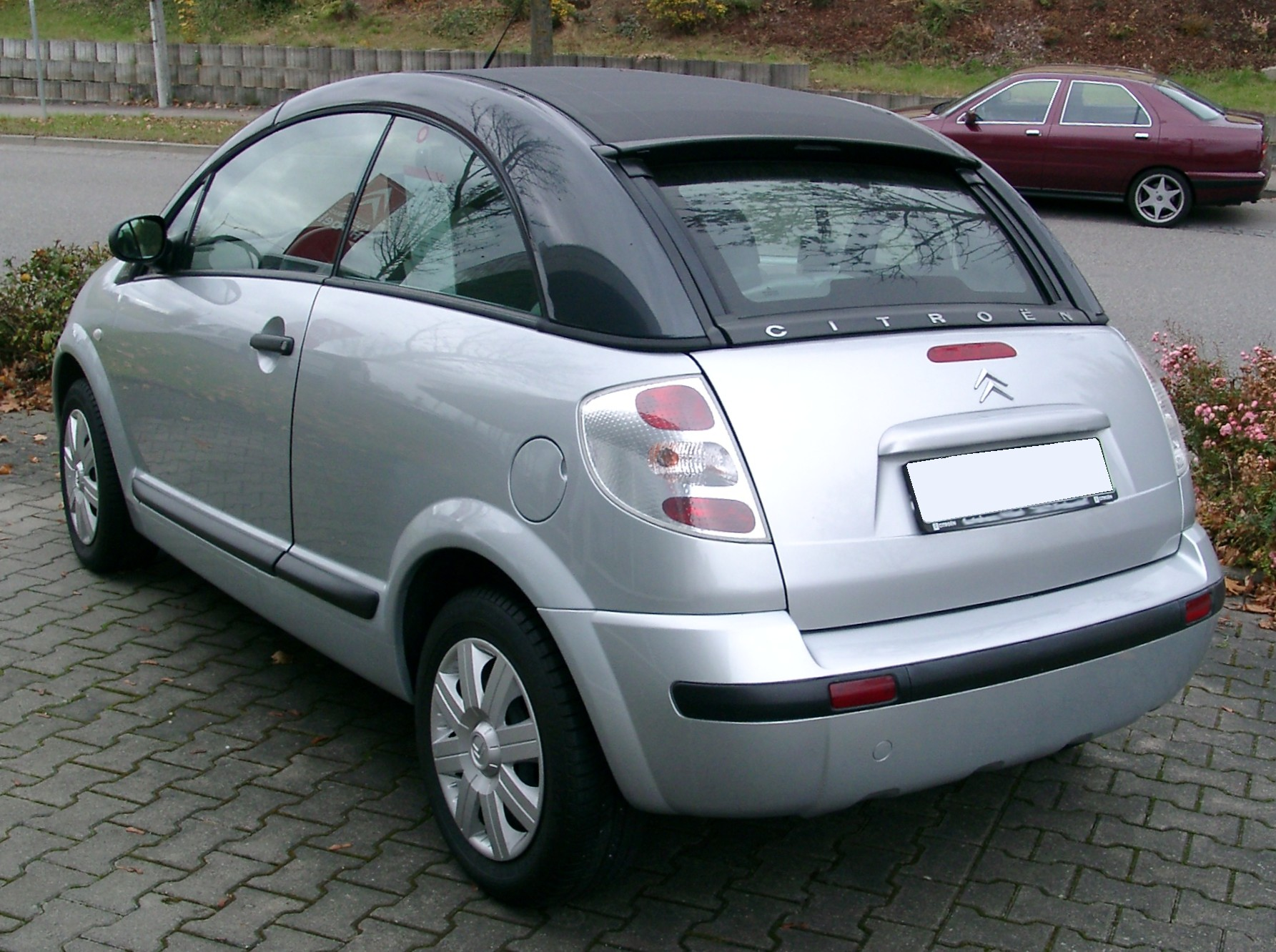
Citroën C3 Pluriel

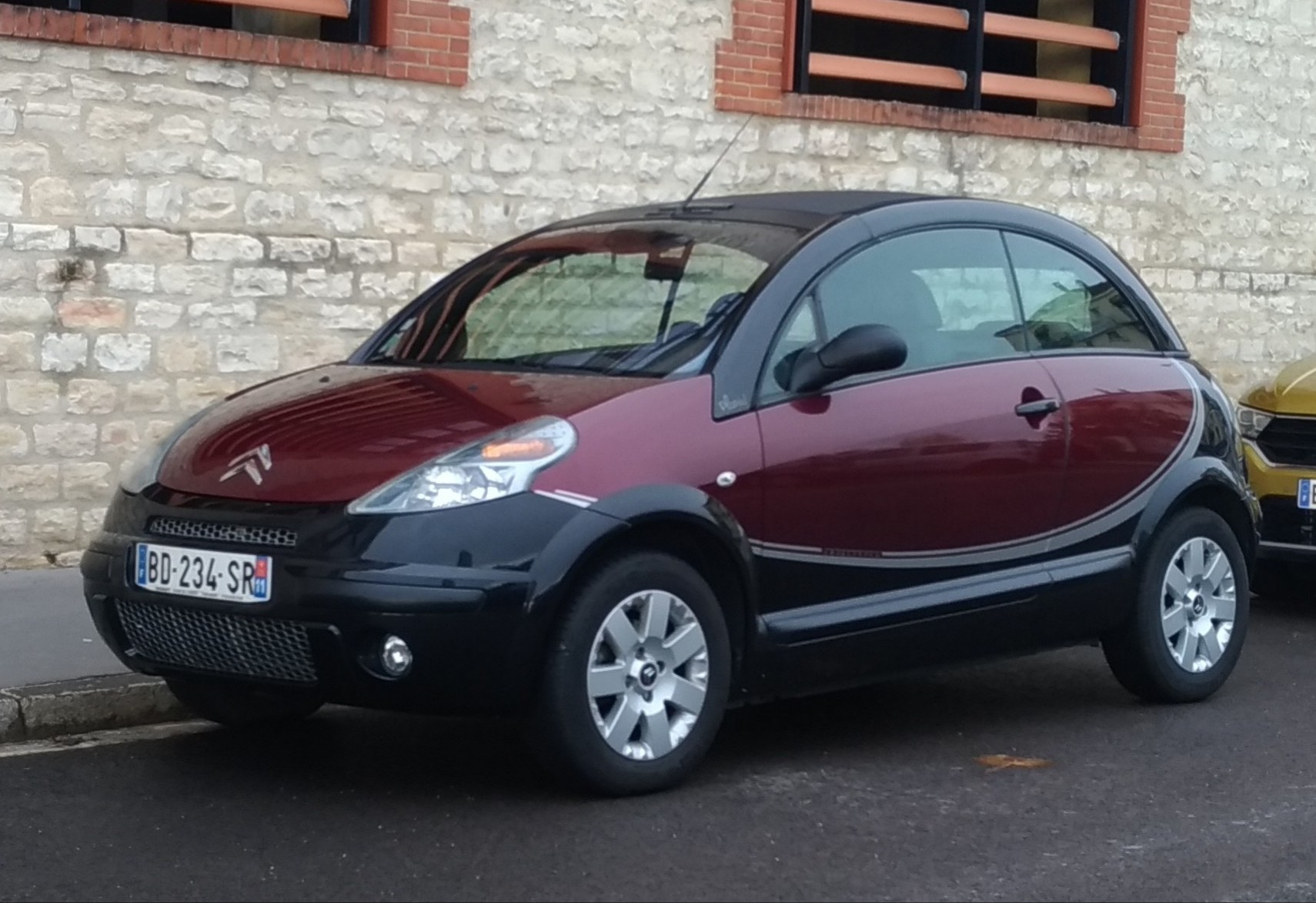
Citroën C3 Pluriel Charleston

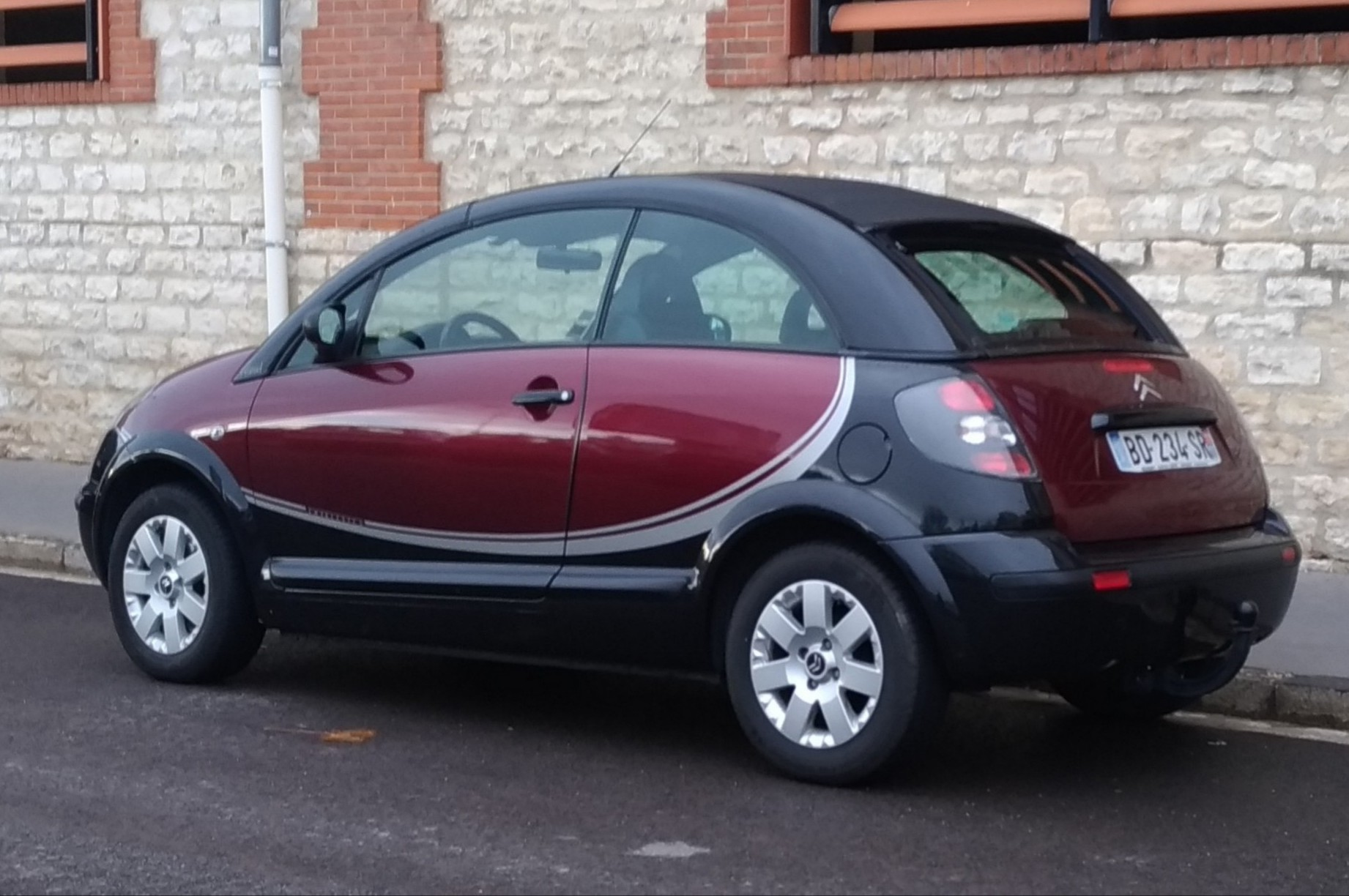
Citroën C3 Pluriel Charleston

=== Engines ===
- 1.1 L (1124 cc) TU1 I4, 45 kW (60 hp) 94 N⋅m (69 lbf⋅ft)
- 1.4 L (1360 cc) TU3 I4, 56 kW (75 hp) and 118 N⋅m (87 lbf⋅ft)
- 1.4 L (1398 cc) DV4 HDi diesel I4, 51 kW (68 hp) and 160 N⋅m (120 lbf⋅ft)
- 1.4 L (1398 cc) DV4 HDi 16-valve diesel I4, 68 kW (91 hp) and 200 N⋅m (150 lbf⋅ft) (discontinued in 2005; could not meet EURO4 compliance)
- 1.4 L (1360 cc) ET3 16 valve I4, 66 kW (89 hp) and 133 N⋅m (98 lbf⋅ft)
- 1.6 L (1560 cc) DV6 HDi 16 valve diesel I4, 67 kW (90 hp) and 215 N⋅m (159 lbf⋅ft)
- 1.6 L (1560 cc) DV6 HDiF 16 valve diesel I4 with diesel particulate filter, 81 kW (109 hp) and 240 N⋅m (180 lbf⋅ft)
- 1.6 L (1587 cc) TU5 16 valve I4, 81 kW (109 hp) and 146 N⋅m (108 lbf⋅ft)

=== Safety ===
ANCAP test results* Citroen C3 5 door hatch (2003)
Test	Score
Overall	4 /5 stars
Frontal offset	13.36/16
Side impact	14.28/16
Pole	Not Assessed
Seat belt reminders	0/3
Whiplash protection	Not Assessed
Pedestrian protection	Marginal
Electronic stability control	Not Assessed

Euro NCAP test results* Citroën C3 SX 1.4 Essence (2002)
Test	Score	Rating
Adult occupant:	28	4 /5 stars
Pedestrian:	11	2 /4 stars

=== South America ===
The first generation C3 was manufactured in the Porto Real PSA plant from 2003 to August 2012. This version was sold locally and also exported to other Mercosur markets. The South American C3 significantly differentiated itself from its European counterpart in 2008 when it got a facelift, including exclusive front bumpers.

A limited number of CKD Citroën C3 have been assembled in Uruguay by local assembler Oferol.

== Second generation (SC; A51; 2009) ==
Second generation
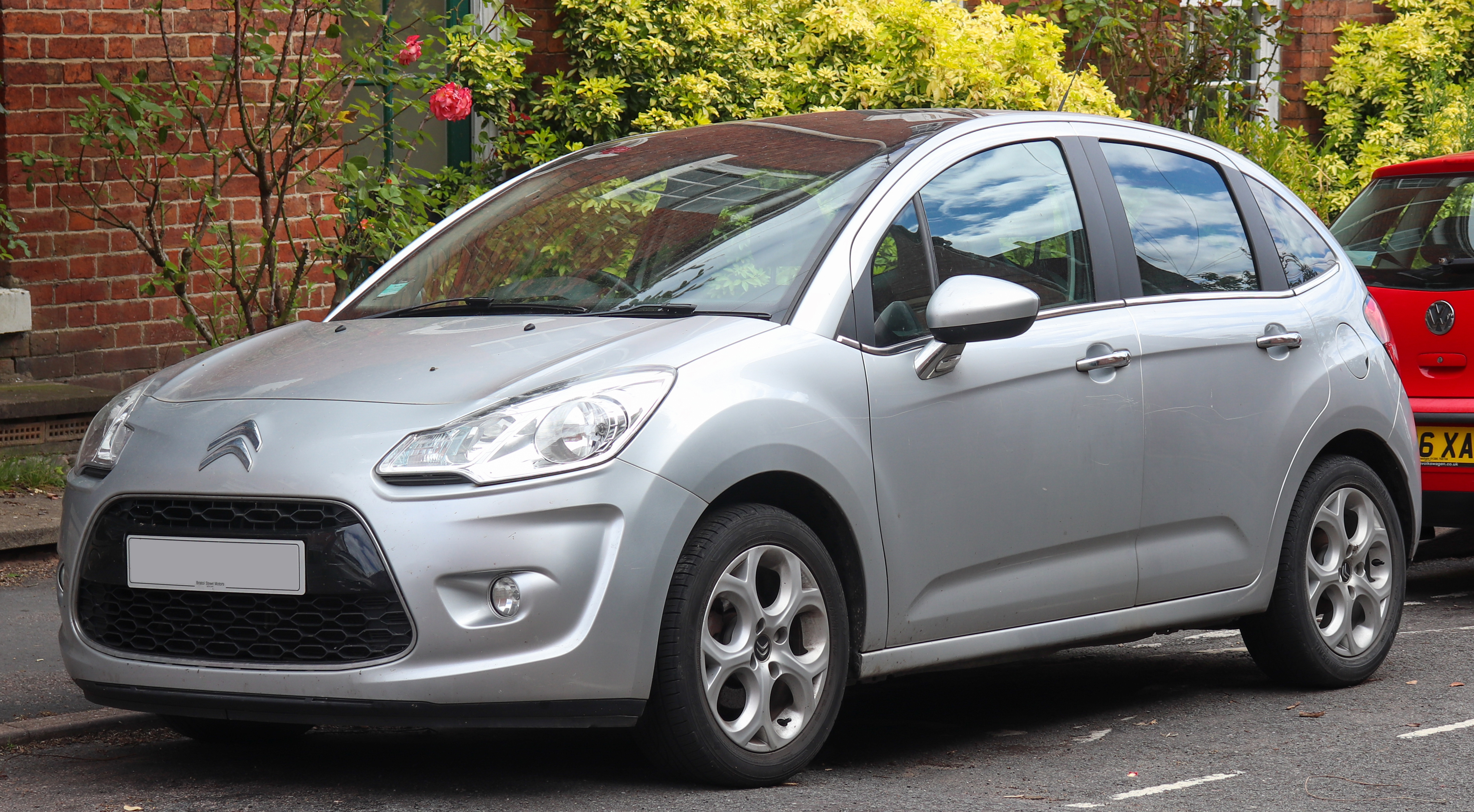

Overview
- Model code: SC
- Production: 2009–2016; 2012–2020 (Brazil)
- Assembly: France: Poissy (PSA Poissy Plant); Aulnay-sous-Bois; Brazil: Porto Real

Body and chassis
- Body style: 5-door hatchback
- Platform: PSA PF1 platform
- Related: Citroën C3 Picasso; Citroën C3 Aircross; Citroën DS3; Citroën C4 Cactus; Peugeot 207

Powertrain
- Engine: Petrol: 1.1 L TU1 I4; 1.4 L TU3 I4; 1.4 L EP3 I4; 1.6 L EP6 I4; Diesel: 1.4 L DV4 I4; 1.6 L DV6 I4
- Transmission: 5-speed manual 6-speed manual 5/6-speed ETG5/6 automated manual 4-speed automatic

Dimensions
- Wheelbase: 2,466 mm (97.1 in)
- Length: 3,941 mm (155.2 in)
- Width: 1,728 mm (68.0 in)
- Height: 1,510 mm (59.4 in)
- Curb weight: 948–1,065 kg (2,090–2,348 lb)

Chronology
- Successor: Citroën C3 (CC21) (Brazil)

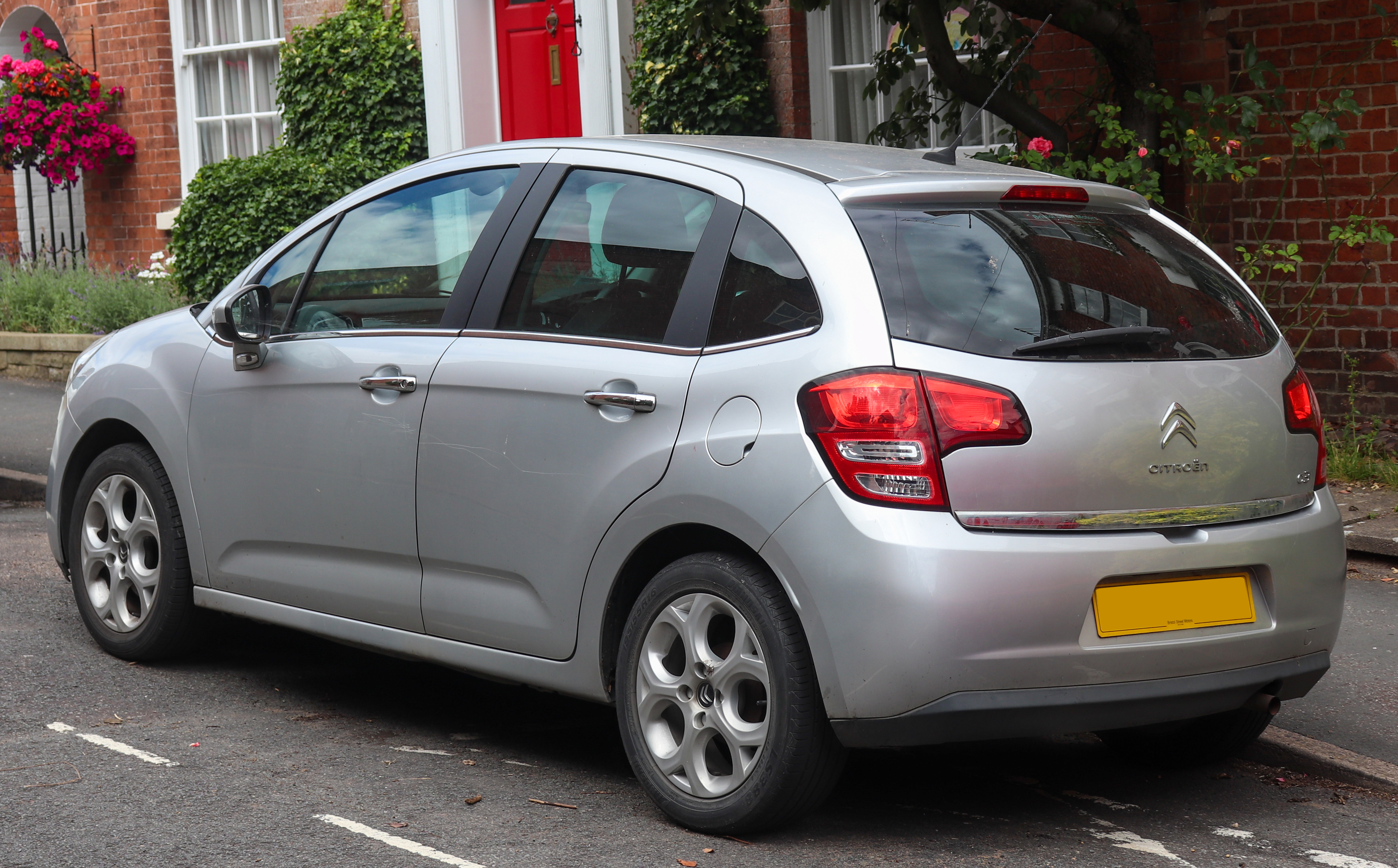
Citroën C3 (Europe, pre-facelift)

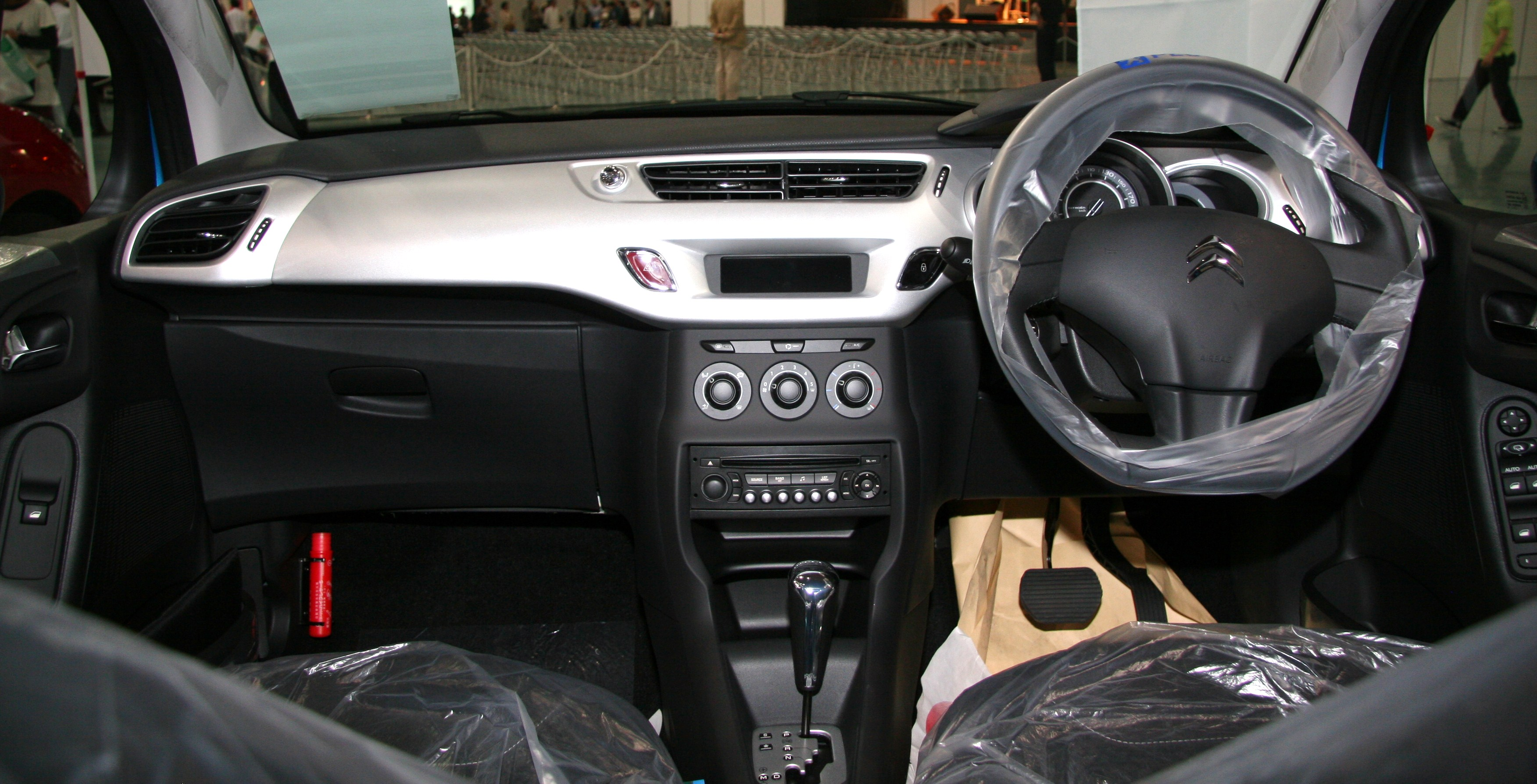
Interior

The second generation of the C3 was revealed on 29 June 2009, and made its official debut at the Frankfurt Motor Show in September 2009. It features a new body design, with a 108 degree field of vision windscreen, similar to that of the larger C4 Picasso, which is available on all versions, except the entry model VT.

The new C3 builds on the curvy profile of the previous model and has a look in keeping with other Citroën models and the older C3, although it is longer and wider than the old model. The lights at the front, bonnet, dashboard assembly, and other components are shared with the DS3.

On the new C3, the instrumentation is a mix of analogue dials beneath a styled cowl and a digital display for the fuel and trip computer. There is no temperature gauge (unlike the DS3), but a red and blue warning lamp to show hot or cold engines which come on as required. The drag coefficient is 0.307 C_{d}.

In engineering terms, the PSA TU powerplants are carried over from the old car and Citroën also announced a new range of small petrol engines that PSA Peugeot Citroën developed in partnership with BMW. These "Prince" engines have double overhead 16 valve camshafts, on-demand oil and water pumps, and BMW's patent injection and ignition technology.

They are designed for low CO_{2} emissions and for good performance and economy. The economy was improved by the standard-fit cruise control and speed limiter available on the VTR+, Airdream+, and Exclusive models.

All versions have a standard fit "Gear Efficiency Indicator" which graphically states what gear to be in and when to change up to optimise economy. They come in 1.4 L 70 kW (95 PS) and 1.6 L 88 kW (120 PS) versions with low emissions, as well as new diesel engines, all with CO_{2} emissions of under 120 g/km, plus an "Airdream+" model with 99 g/km using a new 1.6 HDI 66 kW (90 PS) engine.

The New C3 was presented at the Frankfurt Motor Show in September 2009. It was launched in November 2009, as a 2010 model. Across Europe, the advertising slogan was known as "The Visiospace", playing on the merit of the large windscreen and the improved vision afforded.

=== Facelift ===
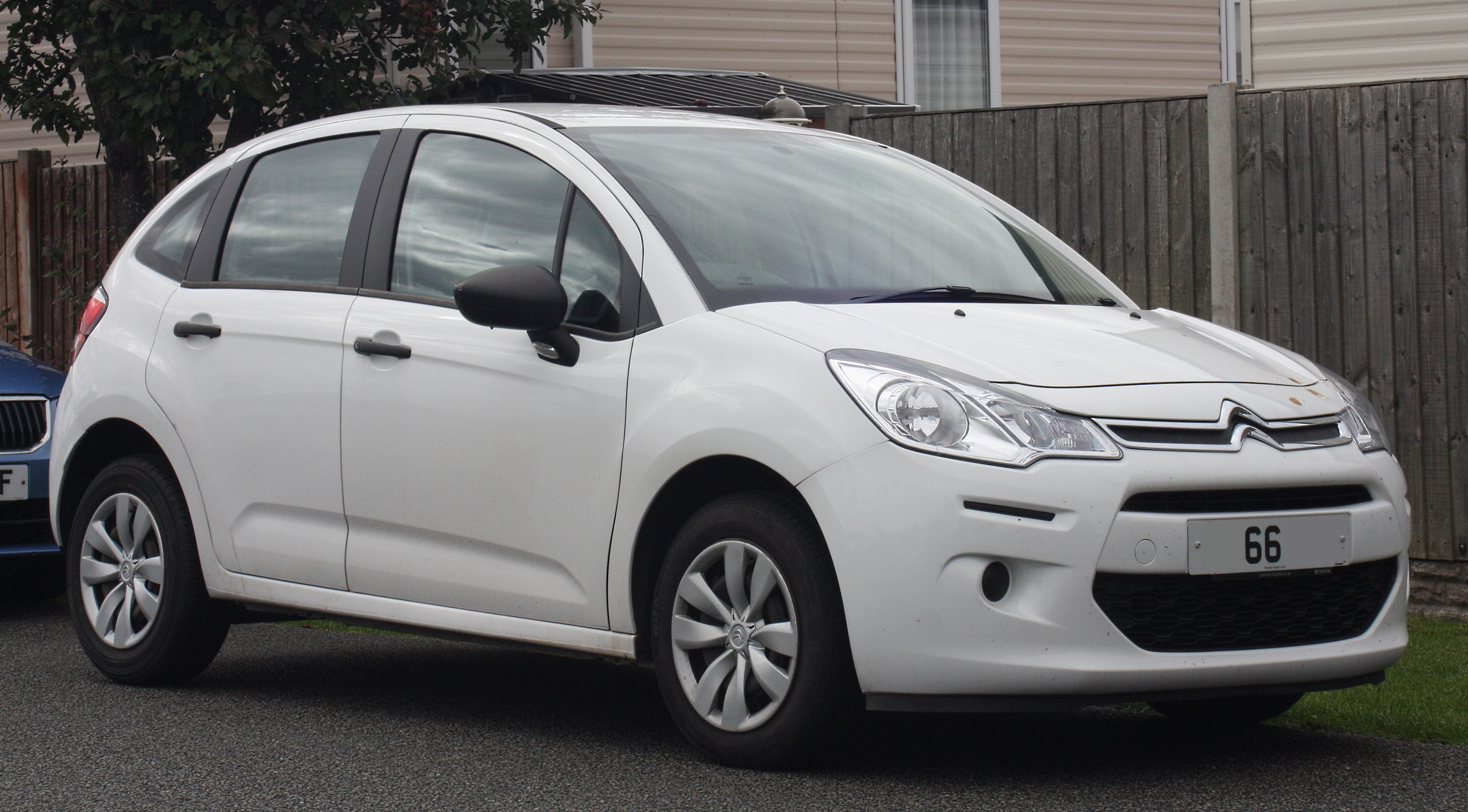

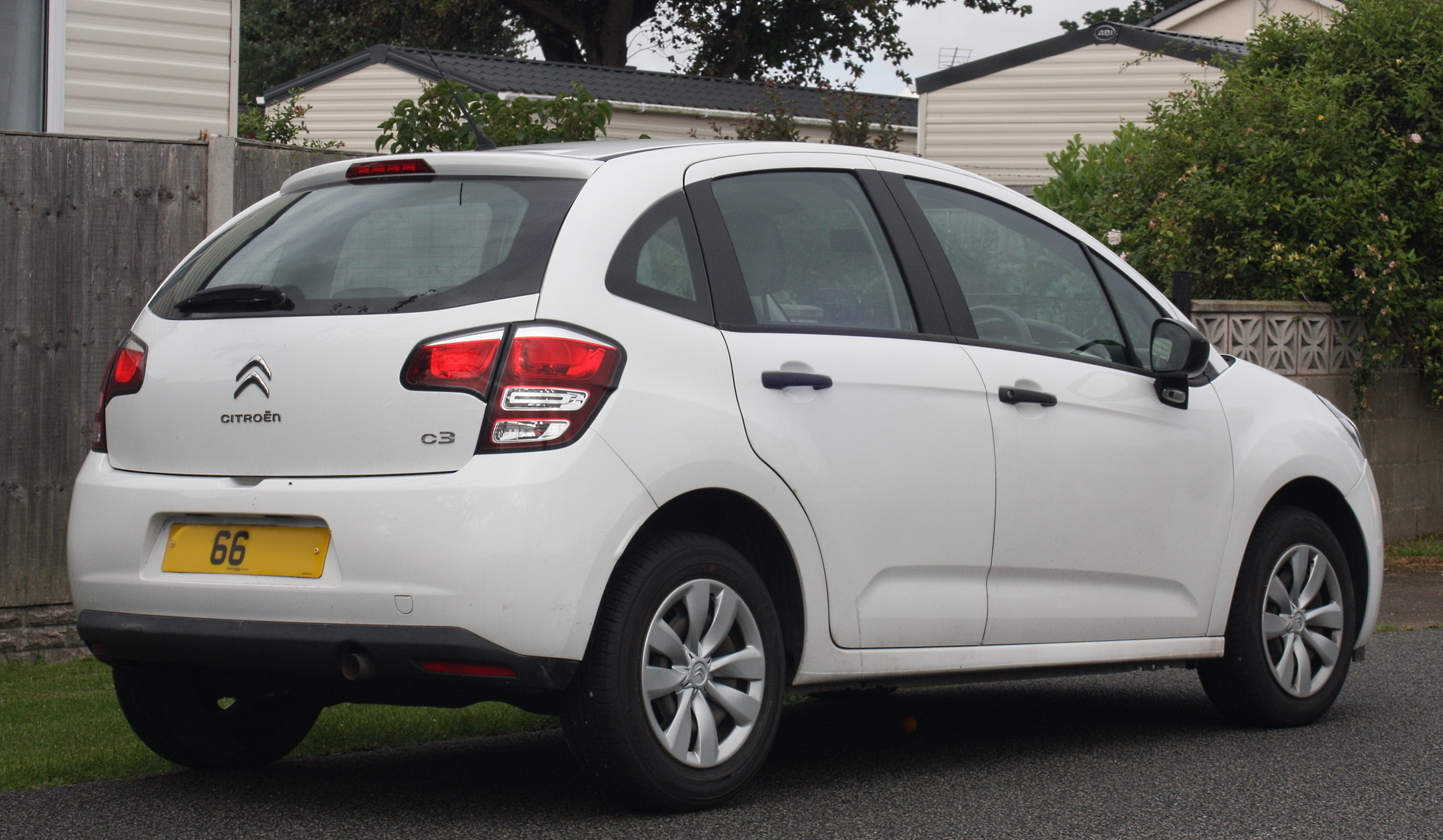
Facelift Citroën C3

Launched at the Geneva Motor Show in March 2013, the C3 hatchback was revised to featuring updated exterior and interior, and more efficient engines. The C3 facelift comes with updated chevrons and bumper-mounted LED daytime running lights at the front and new tail light clusters combined with new reflectors set underneath the rear bumper.

=== Variants ===
There are four trim levels in the C3 range, which range from the entry-level VT (which does not have the panoramic windscreen), the mid-range VTR+ and eco-efficient "Airdream+" (which has lower CO_{2} emissions) to the top of the range Exclusive, which has half cloth half Alcantara seats, extra chrome outside, alloy wheels, an alarm, folding mirrors, and power windows all around.

Trim levels are denoted by a small badge on the rear window frame on the VT/VTR+ and Airdream+ and by a small chrome badge on each front door on Exclusive models. Norev has produced a 1:43 scale model of the new Citroën C3 in Botticelli Blue, Metallic Green, and black.

Trim level	L / i	V	Energy output	Other
VT	1.1i	8	45 kW (61 PS)	
VTR+	1.4i	8	55 kW (75 PS)	
VTR+	1.4VTi	16	70 kW (95 PS)	
VTR+	1.4HDi	8	51 kW (70 PS)	
VTR+	1.6HDi	16	66 kW (90 PS)	Airdream+
Airdream+	1.4i	8	55 kW (75 PS)	
Airdream+	1.4VTi	16	70 kW (95 PS)	
Airdream+	1.4HDi	8	51 kW (70 PS)	
Airdream+	1.6HDi	16	66 kW (90 PS)	Airdream+
Exclusive	1.4VTi	16	70 kW (95 PS)	
Exclusive	1.6VTi	16	88 kW (120 PS)	
Exclusive	1.6VTi	16	88 kW (120 PS)	Auto
Exclusive	1.6HDi	16	66 kW (90 PS)	
Exclusive	1.6HDi	16	81 kW (110 PS)	

=== Engines and transmissions ===
Petrol engines
Model	Year	Engine	Displacement	Power	Torque	0–100 km/h (0–62 mph)	Top speed	Transmission	CO_{2} emission (g/km)
1.1i 8V	2009–present	I4	1124 cc	45 kW (61 PS) at 5,500 rpm	95 N⋅m (70 lbf⋅ft) at 3,300 rpm	16.5 s	145 km/h (90 mph)	5-speed manual	137
1.4i 8V	2009–present	I4	1360 cc	55 kW (75 PS) at 5,200 rpm	118 N⋅m (87 lbf⋅ft) at 3,300 rpm	14.2 s	155 km/h (96 mph)	5-speed manual	140
1.4VTi 16V	2009–present	I4	1397 cc	70 kW (95 PS) at 6,000 rpm	135 N⋅m (100 lbf⋅ft) at 4,000 rpm	10.6 s	170 km/h (106 mph)	5-speed manual	134 (Exclusive); 136 (Airdream+ / VTR+)
1.6VTi 16V	2009–present	I4	1598 cc	88 kW (120 PS) at 6,000 rpm	160 N⋅m (118 lb⋅ft) at 4,200 rpm	8.9 s/10.9 s	185 km/h (115 mph)	5-speed manual	136
1.6VTi 16V	2009–present	I4	1598 cc	88 kW (120 PS) at 6,000 rpm	160 N⋅m (118 lb⋅ft) at 4,200 rpm	8.9 s/10.9 s	185 km/h (115 mph)	4-speed automatic	153

Diesel engines
Model	Year	Engine	Displacement	Power	Torque	0–100 km/h (0–62 mph)	Top speed	Transmission	CO_{2} emission (g/km)
1.4HDi 8V	2009–present	I4	1398 cc	51 kW (70 PS) at 4,000 rpm	160 N⋅m (118 lbf⋅ft) at 2,000 rpm	13.7 s	152 km/h (94 mph)	5-speed manual	113
1.6HDi 16V	2009–present	I4	1560 cc	66 kW (90 PS) at 3,750 rpm	230 N⋅m (170 lbf⋅ft) at 2,000 rpm	11.3 s/11.5 s	168 km/h (104 mph)	5-speed manual	98
1.6HDi 16V	2009–2015	I4	1560 cc	81 kW (110 PS) at 4,000 rpm	270 N⋅m (199 lbf⋅ft) at 2,000 rpm	9.9 s	180 km/h (112 mph)	6-speed manual	115

By 2016, a 74 kW (100 PS) 1.6HDi with 5-speed gearbox was available.

=== Safety ===
==== ANCAP ====
ANCAP test results* Citroen C3 variant(s) as tested (2011)
Test	Score
Overall	5 /5 stars
Frontal offset	14.38/16
Side impact	16/16
Pole	Not Assessed
Seat belt reminders	1/3
Whiplash protection	Marginal
Pedestrian protection	Marginal
Electronic stability control	Standard

==== Euro NCAP ====
Euro NCAP test results* Citroën C3 1.4 diesel (LHD) (2009)
Test	Points	%
Overall:	4 /5 stars	
Adult occupant:	29.7	83%
Child occupant:	36.1	74%
Pedestrian:	11.8	33%
Safety assist:	2.8	40%

==== Latin NCAP ====
The C3 in its most basic Latin American market configuration received 4 stars for adult occupants and 2 stars for toddlers from Latin NCAP 1.5 in 2015.

Latin NCAP 1.5 test results Citroen C3 + 2 Airbags (2015, similar to Euro NCAP 2002)
Test	Points	Stars
Adult occupant:	11.19/17.0	4 /5 stars
Child occupant:	22.67/49.00	2 /5 stars

== Third generation (SX/SY; 2016) ==
Third generation (Europe)
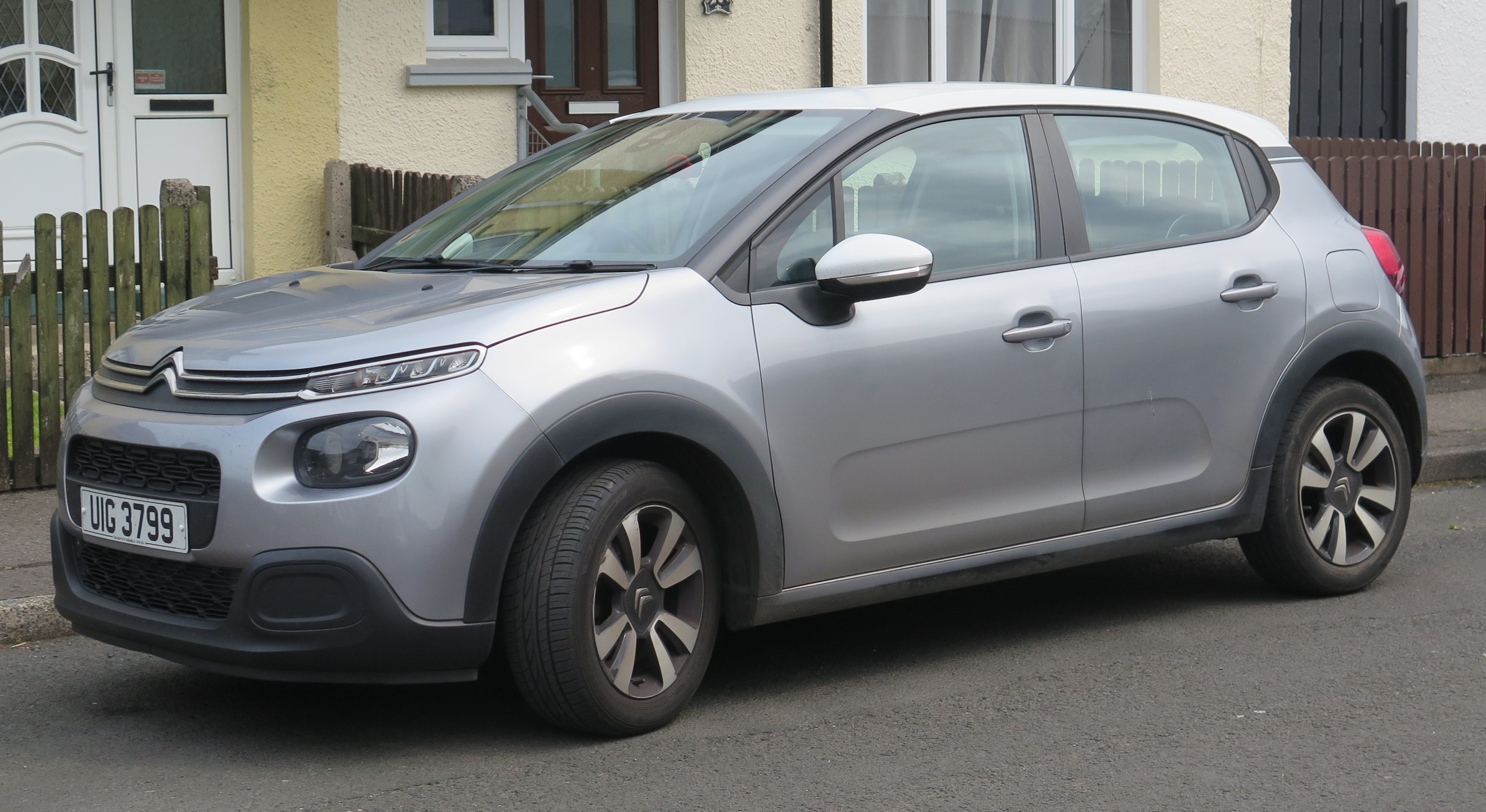
- Pre-facelift Citroën C3

Overview
- Model code: SX/SY
- Also called: Citroën C3 Cross (French Polynesia); Citroën C3 Origin (Europe; 2024–2025)
- Production: 2016–2024
- Assembly: Slovakia: Trnava (PSA Trnava Plant); Iran: Kashan (Saipa Citröen)
- Designer: Cyril Pietton (exterior); Jean-Arthur Madelaine (interior); Sylvain Henry (facelift, exterior)

Body and chassis
- Body style: 5-door hatchback
- Platform: PSA PF1 platform
- Related: DS 3 Peugeot 208; Citroën C4 Cactus

Powertrain
- Engine: Petrol: 1.2 L PSA EB2F I3; 1.2 L PSA EB2DT turbo I3; Diesel: 1.5 L DV5 BlueHDi I4; 1.6 L DV6 BlueHDi I4
- Transmission: 5/6-speed manual 6-speed automatic

Dimensions
- Wheelbase: 2,540 mm (100.0 in)
- Length: 3,996 mm (157.3 in)
- Width: 1,740–1,749 mm (68.5–68.9 in)
- Height: 1,470 mm (57.9 in)
- Curb weight: 968–1,080 kg (2,134–2,381 lb)

The official pictures of the new C3 were revealed on 29 June 2016. The C3 takes front styling cues from the facelifted Citroën C4 Picasso, as well as the Grand C4 Picasso. It receives optional side Airbump mouldings as used on the Citroën C4 Cactus.

The new C3 is offered with a choice of nine exterior colours, and three contrast shades that appear on the roof, foglight trims, side mirrors, and Airbump surrounds. Citroën claims the range will offer a total of 36 different colour combinations.

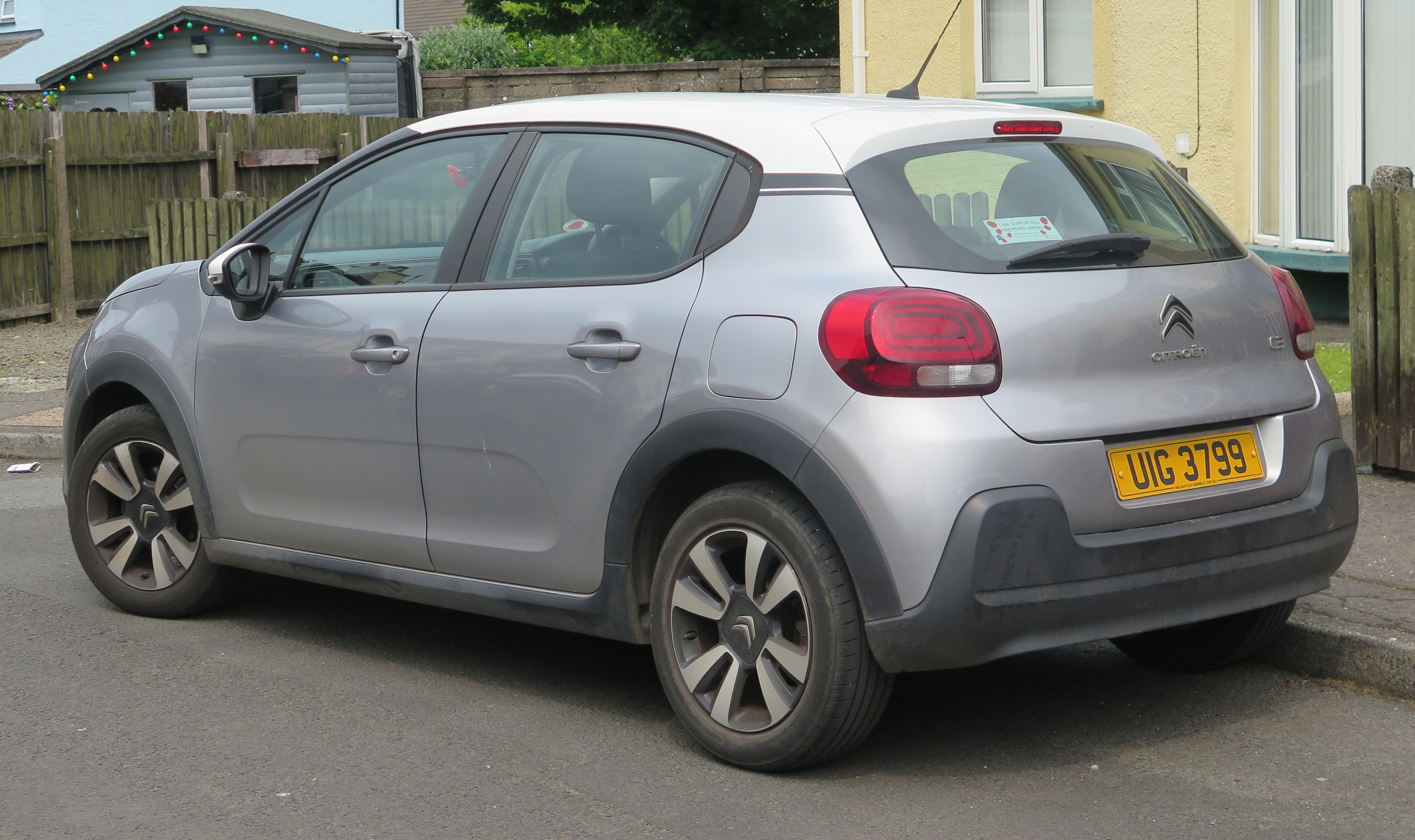
Citroen C3

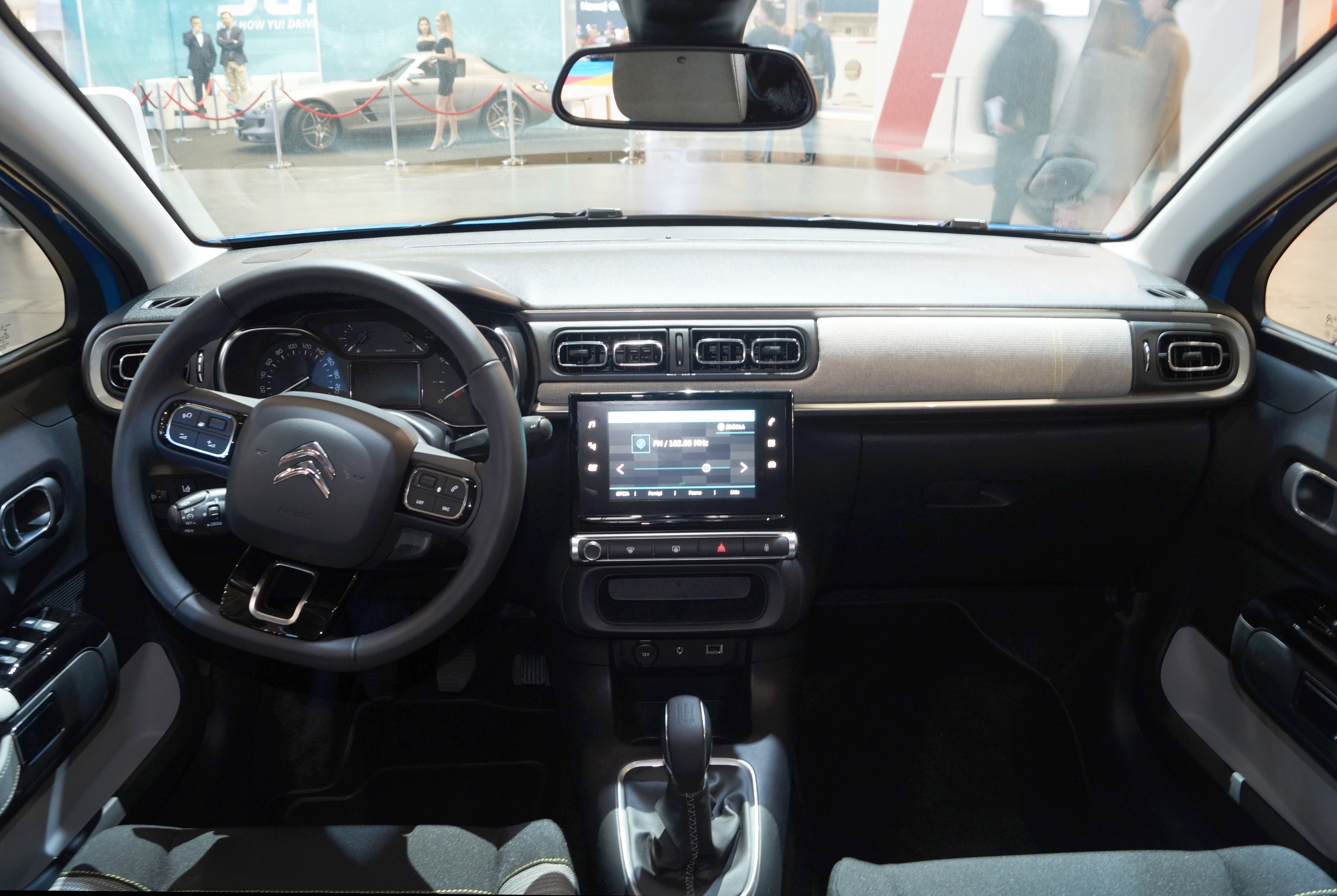
Interior

=== Facelift (2020) ===
The restyled version was revealed in February 2020. The main evolutions are on the front and on the headlights with new LEDs. There are two new colours, "Spring Blue" and "Rouge Elixir", and two new interior atmospheres called "Techwood" and "Emeraude".

Launched in 2023, C3 You is the new entry-level version.

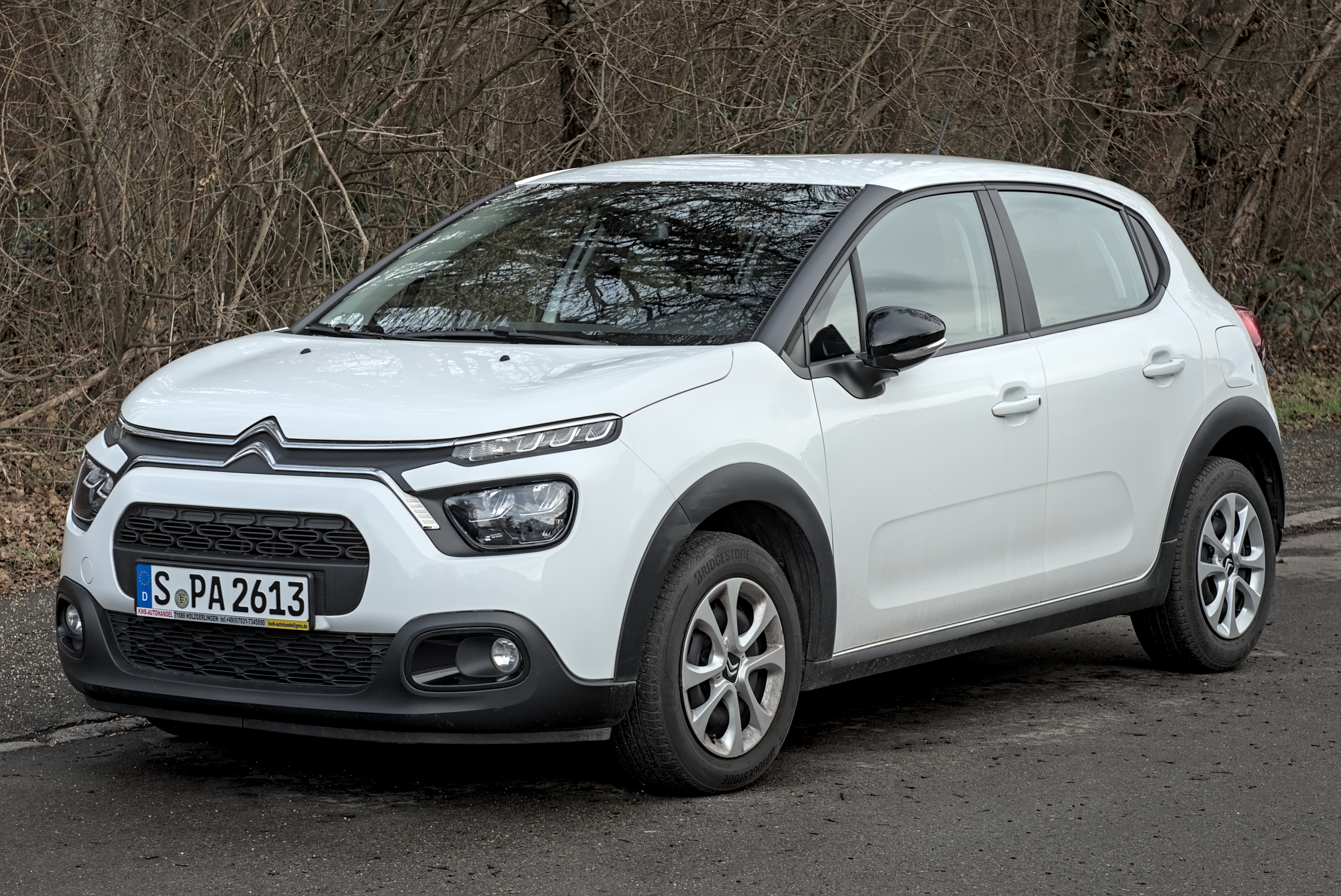
Facelift C3

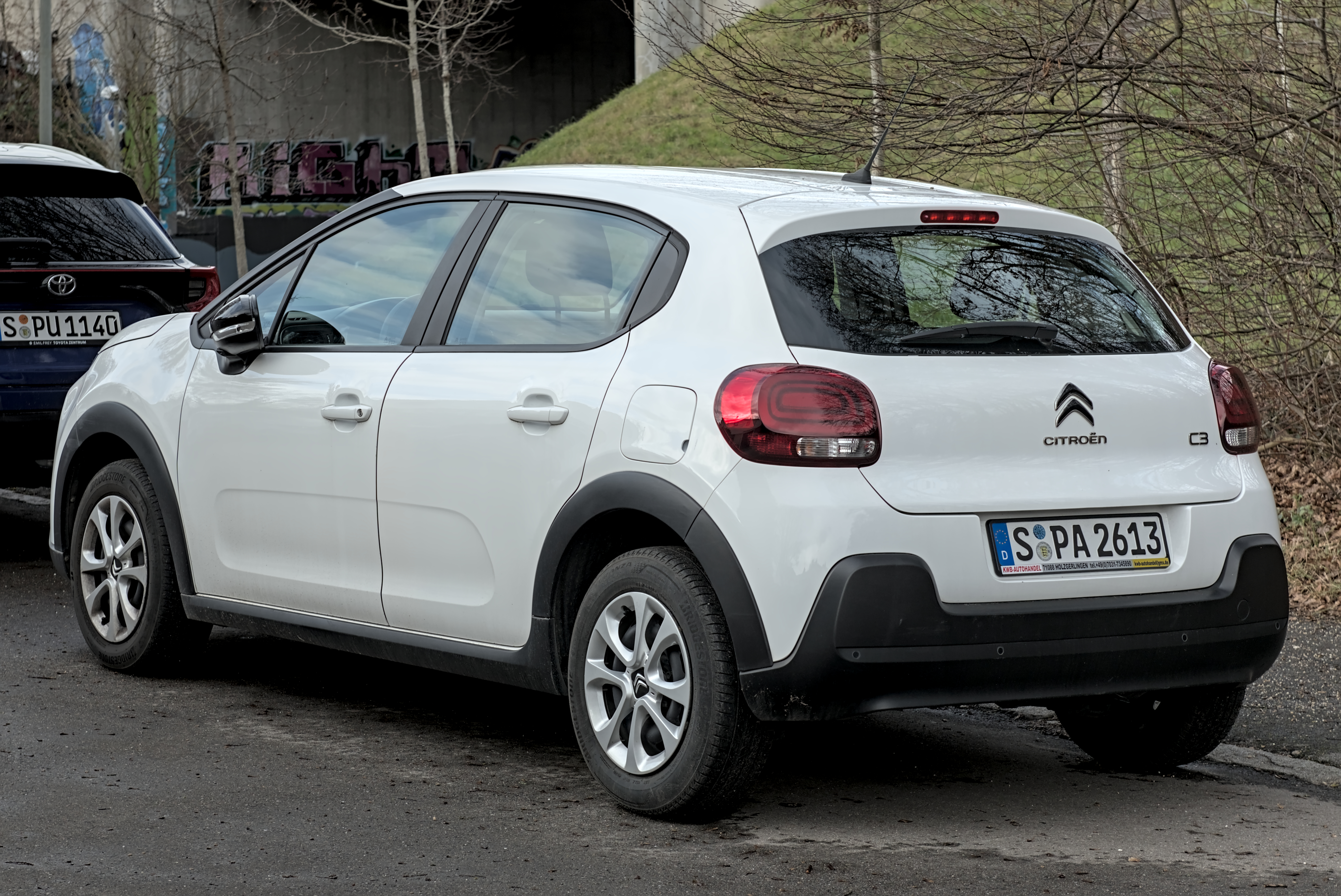
Facelift C3

=== Engines and transmissions ===
Petrol engines
Model	Year	Engine	Displacement	Power	Torque	0–100 km/h (0–62 mph)	Top speed	Transmission	CO_{2} emission (g/km)
1.2 Puretech	2016–2019	I3	1199 cc	50 kW; 67 hp (68 PS) at 6,000 rpm	95 N⋅m (70 lbf⋅ft) at 3,000 rpm	14.4 s	164 km/h (102 mph)	5-speed manual	109
1.2 Puretech	2016–present	I3	1199 cc	61 kW; 82 hp (83 PS) at 5,750 rpm	118 N⋅m (87 lbf⋅ft) at 2,750 rpm	13.0 s	167 km/h (104 mph)	5-speed manual	124
1.2 Puretech Turbo	2016–present	I3	1199 cc	81 kW; 110 hp (110 PS) at 5500 rpm	151 N⋅m (111 lbf⋅ft) at 1750 rpm	9.8 s	188 km/h (117 mph)	5 speed manual (2016–2018); 6 speed manual 6 speed automatic	133

Diesel engines
Model	Year	Engine	Displacement	Power	Torque	0–100 km/h (0–62 mph)	Top speed	Transmission	CO_{2} emission (g/km)
1.6L DW6 BlueHDI I4	2016–2018	I4	1599 cc	73 kW; 98 hp (99 PS) at 3,750 rpm	254 N⋅m (187 lbf⋅ft) at 1,750 rpm	10.6 s	185 km/h (115 mph)	5-speed manual	95
1.5L DW5 BlueHDi I4	2018–present	I4	1499 cc	75 kW; 101 hp (102 PS) at 3,500 rpm	250 N⋅m (184 lbf⋅ft) at 1,750 rpm	10.4 s	188 km/h (117 mph)	6-speed manual	113

=== Safety ===
ANCAP test results* Citroen C3 all variants (2017, aligned with Euro NCAP)
Test	Points	%
Overall:	4 /5 stars	
Adult occupant:	33.4	88%
Child occupant:	41	83%
Pedestrian:	25	59%
Safety assist:	7	58%

Euro NCAP test results* Citroën C3 1.2 PureTech 82 Feel (LHD) (2017)
Test	Points	%
Overall:	4 /5 stars	
Adult occupant:	33.5	88%
Child occupant:	41	83%
Pedestrian:	25	59%
Safety assist:	7	58%

=== India and Latin America (2022) ===
Third generation (India and Latin America)
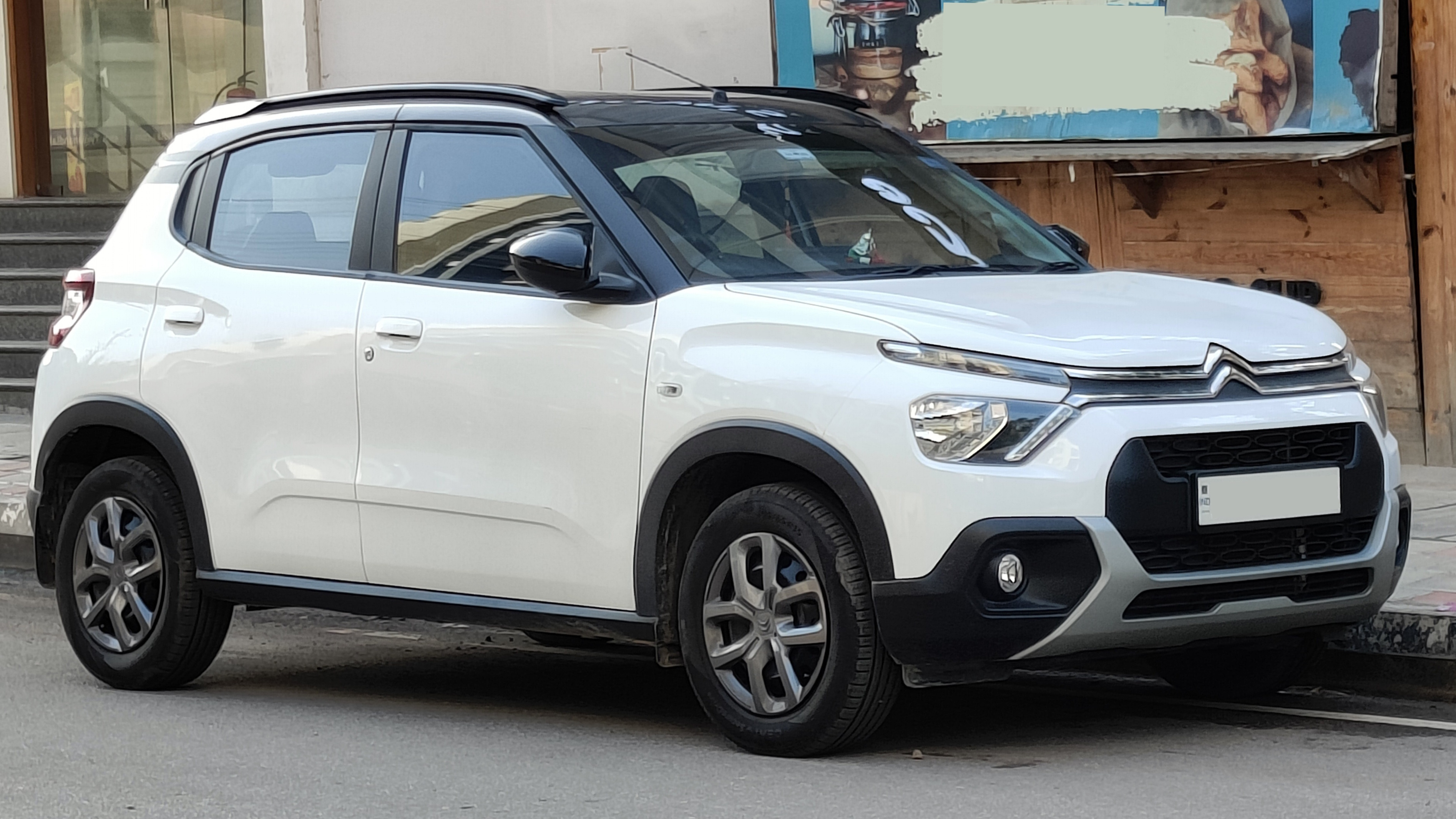

Overview
- Also called: Citroën ë-C3 (electric)
- Production: 2022–present
- Assembly: Brazil: Porto Real, Rio de Janeiro; India: Tiruvallur, Tamil Nadu (Citroën India)

Body and chassis
- Body style: 5-door hatchback
- Platform: Smart Car Platform
- Related: Citroën C3 Aircross (CC24); Citroën Basalt

Powertrain
- Engine: Petrol: 1.0 L N3 I3 flex fuel; 1.0 L T200 turbo I3 flex fuel; 1.2 L EB2F I3; 1.2 L EB2DT turbo I3; 1.6 L I4 flex fuel
- Electric motor: 42 kW (57 PS; 56 hp) permanent magnet synchronous (ë-C3)
- Transmission: 5-speed manual; 6-speed manual; 6-speed automatic; CVT (Latin America)
- Battery: 29.2 kWh lithium-ion (ë-C3)
- Electric range: 320 km (200 mi) (ë-C3)

Dimensions
- Wheelbase: 2,540 mm (100.0 in)
- Length: 3,981 mm (156.7 in)
- Width: 1,733 mm (68.2 in)
- Height: 1,586 mm (62.4 in)

The third generation C3 for Indian and Latin American markets was released on 16 September 2021 and produced since 2022. Produced in Brazil and India, the model has been described by Citroën as a "modern hatchback", avoiding the "crossover SUV" branding.

It is based on the Smart Car Platform and is completely unrelated to the European C3.

The exterior has crossover SUV styling with its high ground clearance, high bonnet, roof rails and black cladding. There are split headlights connected to Citroen’s double-slat grille, the option of orange accents on the front bumper and side cladding, an upright rear hatch door and rectangular LED taillights.

The interior has a 10-inch touchscreen infotainment system, a dimpled-effect on the dashboard panel, a raised driving position and the colour of the dashboard and seat fabrics can be customised.

In India, the C3 is praised for its dynamic qualities, but receives persistent criticism for the lack of equipment offered on the model. As a result of this criticism, Citroën revised its offering in this market in August 2024, adding automatic climate control, a new instrument cluster inherited from the Citroën C3 Aircross and Citroën Basalt, and 6 airbags as standard.

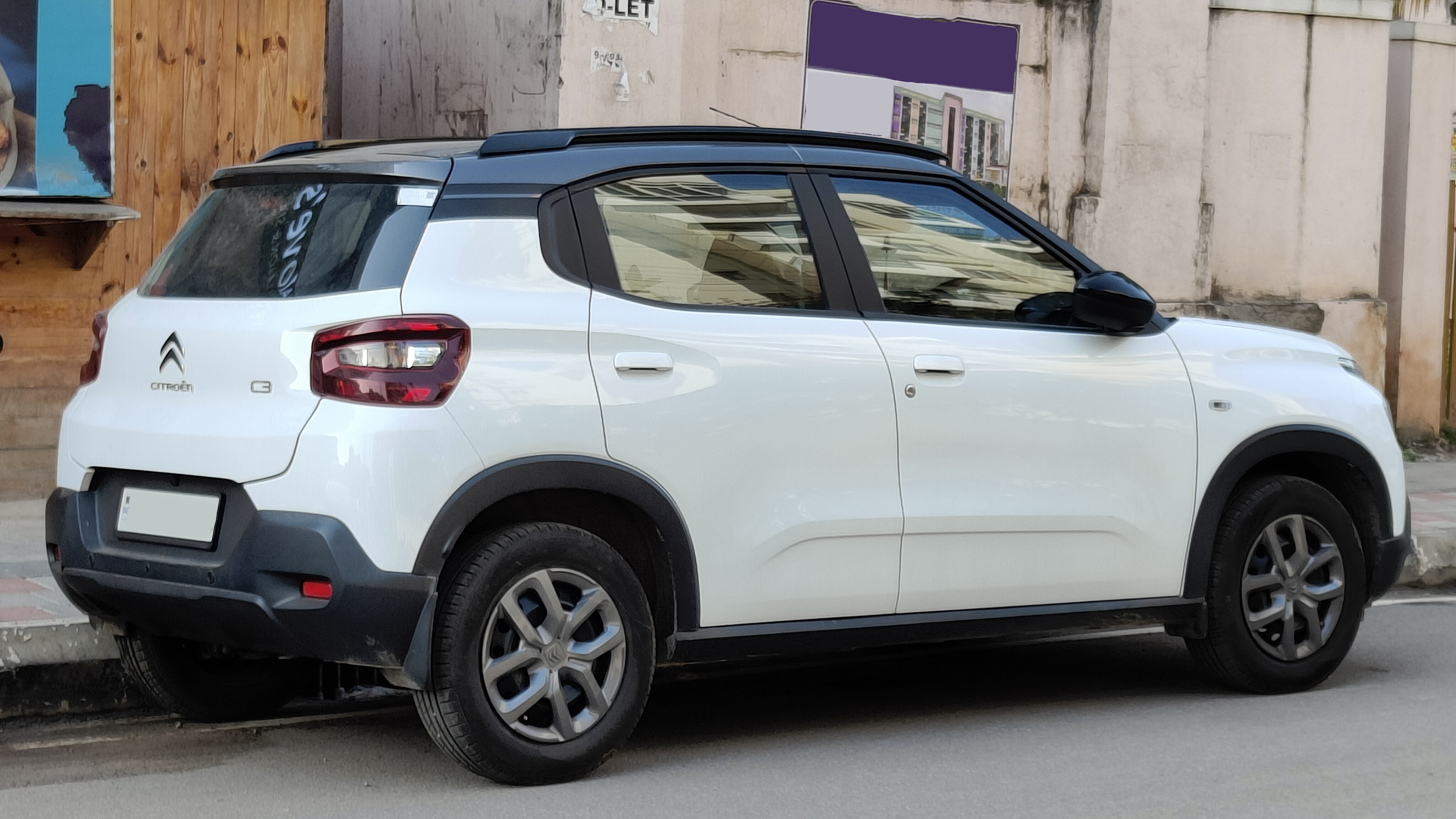
Rear view

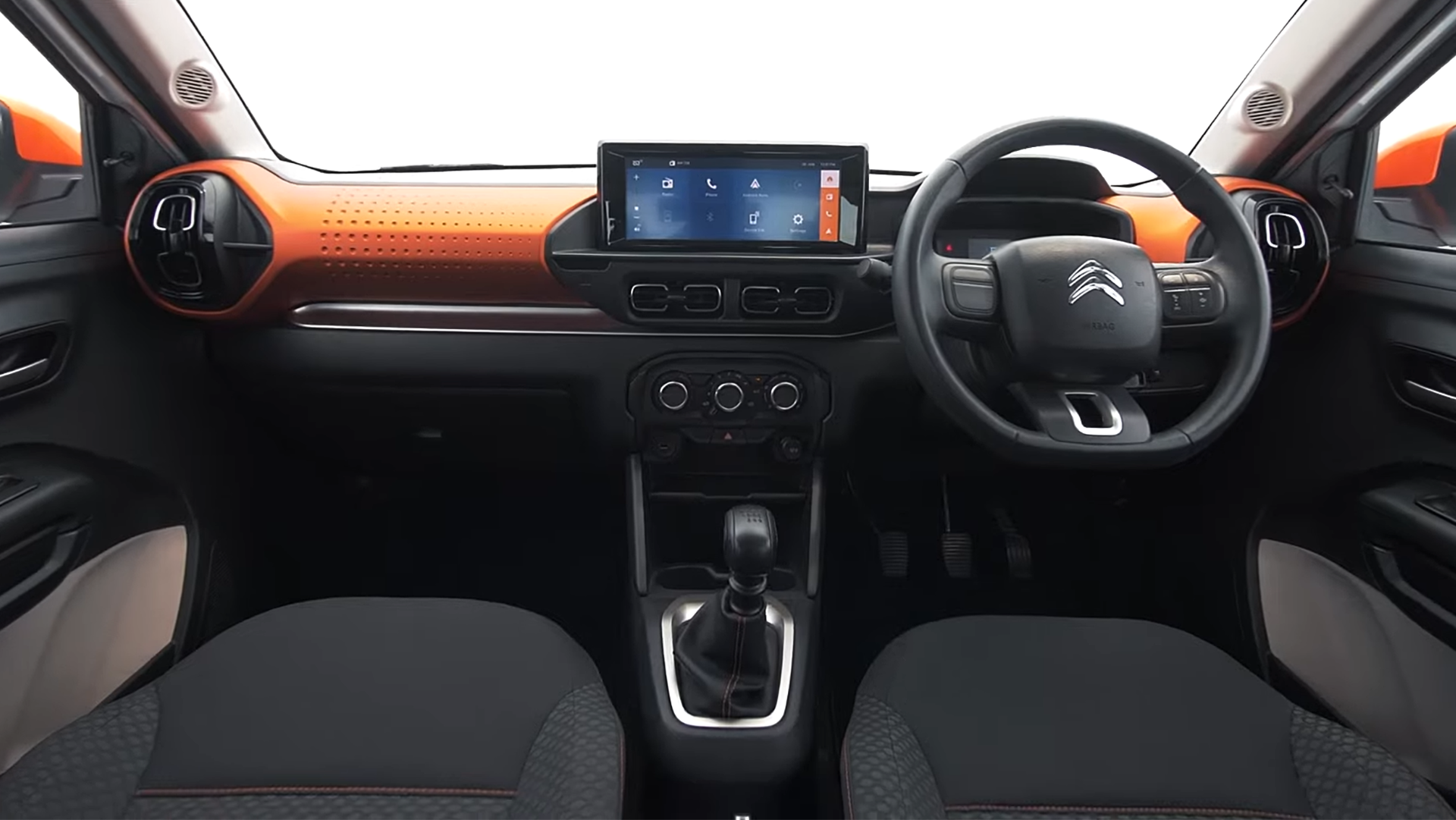
Interior

==== ë-C3 (India and Latin America) ====
In January 2023, Citroën unveiled the all-electric ë-C3 in India with a 42 kW (57 PS; 56 hp) electric motor, a 29.2 kWh battery and a range of 320 km (199 mi). The ë-C3 has blue 'ë' badges on the front doors, a charging port on front fender, the omission of a tailpipe and the only interior difference is a selector switch instead of a gear knob compared to the regular C3.

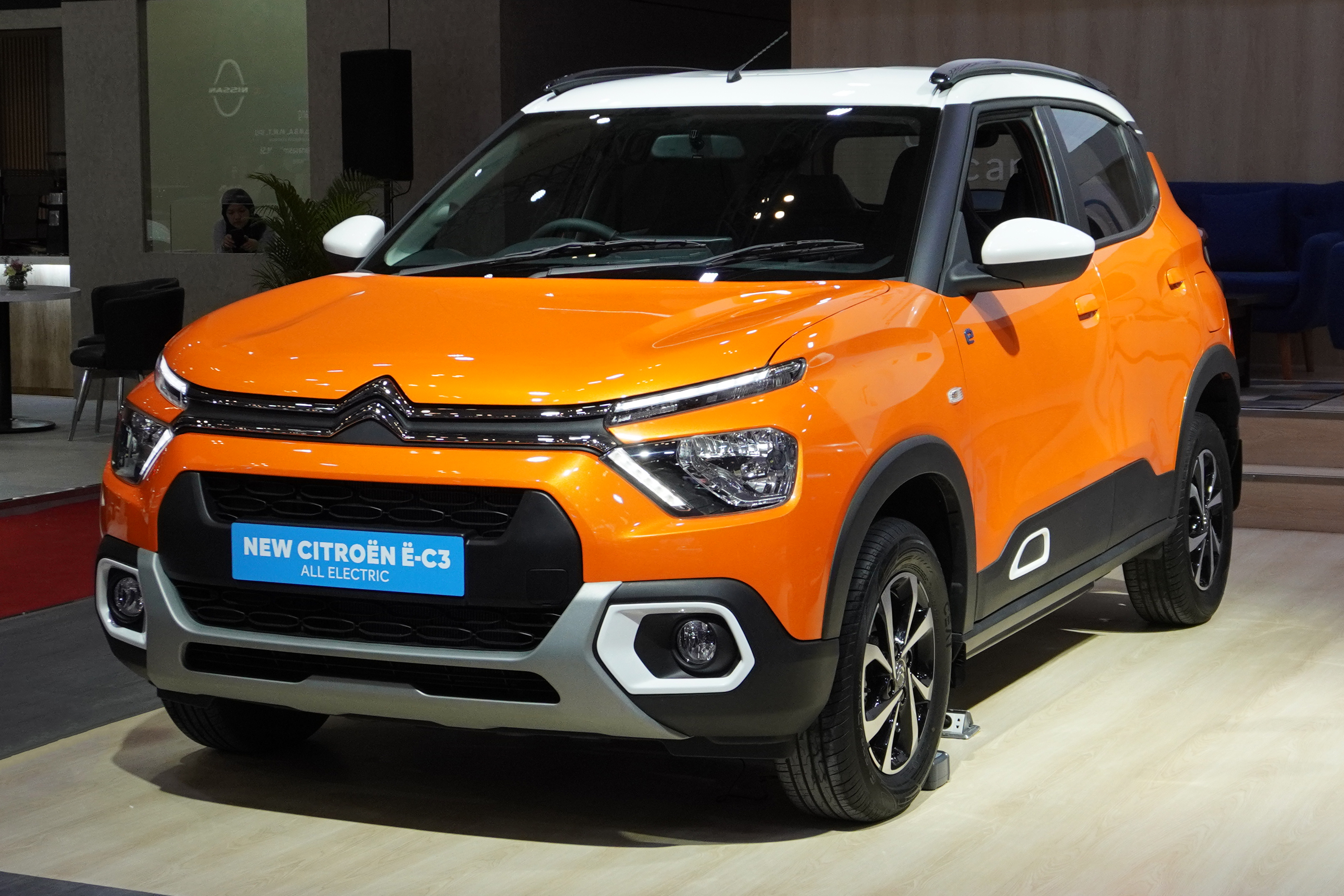
Citroën ë-C3

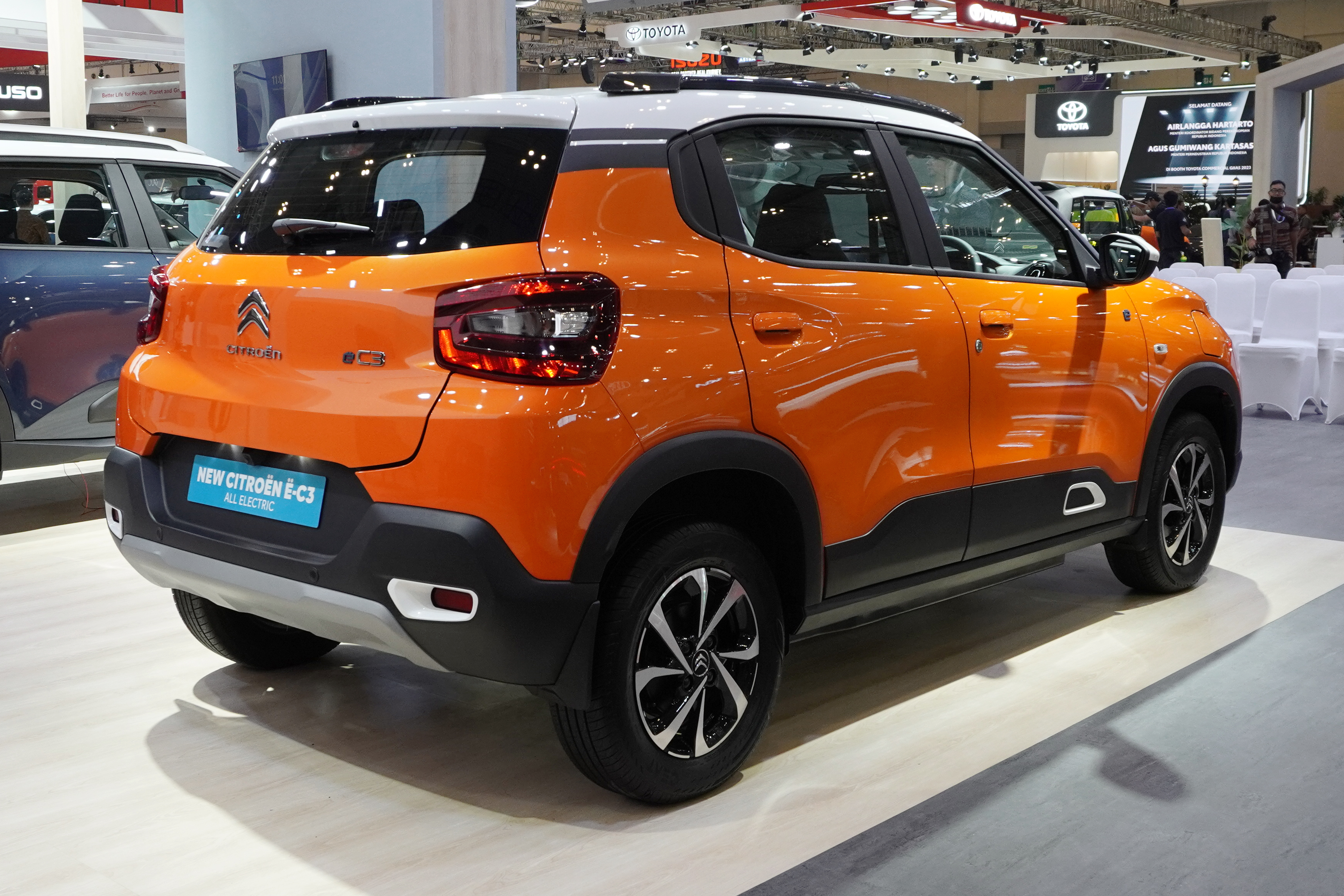
Rear view

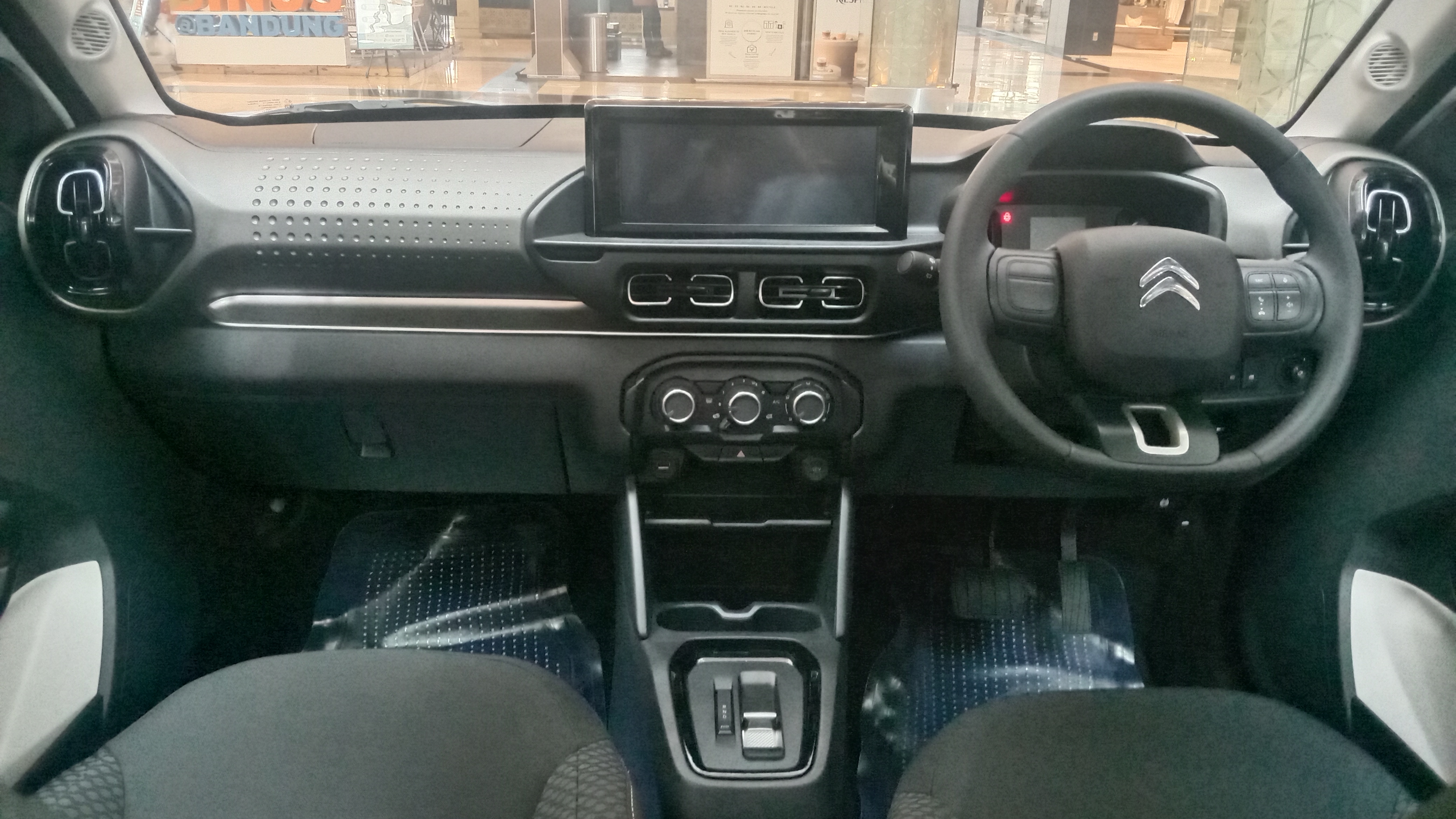
Interior

==== Markets ====
===== Argentina =====
The third-generation C3 was launched in 24 October 2022 with four trim levels: Live, Live Pack, Feel and Feel Pack. Two engine options are available: a EB2F 1.2-litre PureTech petrol with 60 kW (82 PS; 80 hp) and a 1.6-litre Flex Fuel petrol. At launch, there was a First Edition model limited at 1,200 units, it is distinguished by "First Edition" exterior badges.

===== Brazil =====
The third-generation C3 was launched in Brazil with four trim levels: Live, Live Pack, Feel and Feel Pack. Two engine options are available: a 1.0-litre FireFly petrol by Fiat and a 1.6-litre Flex Fuel petrol. At launch, there was a First Edition model available.

Since 2023, the Brazilian-made C3 has been exported outside of Mercosur, in several Latin America countries such as Chile, Peru and Costa Rica.

In August 2024, the C3 YOU! version was introduced in Brazil with a Fiat 1.0L turbo engine paired to a CVT.

===== India =====
The third-generation C3 was launched in India on 20 July 2022, with two trim levels: Live and Feel. Two engine options are available: a EB2F 1.2-litre PureTech petrol with 60 kW (82 PS; 80 hp) and a EB2DT 1.2-litre PureTech turbocharged petrol with 81 kW (110 PS; 109 hp). The Shine trim was later added in April 2023.

The Indian-made C3 uses 90% local parts and began exports to ASEAN markets on 31 March 2023.

The ë-C3 was launched in India on 27 February 2023, with two trim levels: Live and Feel. The Shine trim for the ë-C3 was later added in January 2024.

===== Indonesia =====
The third-generation C3 was launched in Indonesia on 7 December 2022, as part of Citroën's return to Indonesia. In Indonesia, the C3 is powered by a EB2F 1.2-litre PureTech petrol with 60 kW (82 PS; 80 hp), only available with a 5-speed manual, comes in standard and Plus variants.

The ë-C3 was introduced to Indonesia in August 2023 at the 30th Gaikindo Indonesia International Auto Show. The first 500 units of the ë-C3 destined for the Indonesian market commenced imports in April 2024.

The Sport variant was added in July 2025 which features red exterior stripes, the interior features sporty seat covers and ambient lighting, metal accents on the pedal, and additional safety features such as six airbags and a reversing camera.

===== South Africa =====
The third-generation C3 was launched in South Africa on 25 May 2023 in a sole Feel trim, powered by a EB2F 1.2-litre PureTech petrol with 60 kW (82 PS; 80 hp). The Max trim (positioned above the Feel trim) was later added in March 2024. The EB2DT 1.2-litre PureTech turbocharged petrol with 81 kW (110 PS; 109 hp) was made available for the Max trim in November 2024. In February 2026, the C3 line-up was updated for the 2026 model year which saw additional standard features and the Feel trim was discontinued.

The panel van model marketed as the C3 Hola was launched in South Africa on 10 April 2026, in the sole variant powered by a EB2F 1.2-litre PureTech petrol with 60 kW (82 PS; 80 hp), as the cheapest variant in the Citroën line-up in the country.

==== Safety ====
===== India =====
In India, the C3 is fitted with two frontal airbags, anti-lock brakes, seatbelt reminders for front-seat occupants and speed alerts at 80 km/h and 120 km/h as required by Indian AIS safety regulations. Side airbags for the thorax or head are not available, and neither are electronic stability control or a tyre pressure monitor. The rear centre seatbelt is of a dangerous static two-point type and this seating position is not fitted with a head restraint. The rear outboard head restraints are not adjustable. There are no ISOFIX anchorages for child restraints. Although the C3 complies with Indian crashworthiness legislation, it has not been rated by independent consumer testing programmes like Global NCAP.

In February 2024, Citroën India announced that all variants of the Indian C3 would be fitted with six airbags and rear seatbelt reminders by July of the same year.

The Indian version of the ë-C3 received 0 stars for adults and 1 star for toddlers from Global NCAP in 2024 (similar to Latin NCAP 2016).

Global NCAP 2.0 test results (India) Citroën ë-C3 (2024, similar to Latin NCAP 2016)
Test	Score	Stars
Adult occupant protection	20.86/34.00	0 /5 stars
Child occupant protection	10.55/49.00	1 /5 stars

===== Latin America =====
In Brazil, the C3 is fitted with two frontal airbags, anti-lock brakes, electronic stability control, seatbelt reminders for the front seats, ISOFIX anchorages at the rear outboard seats, and adjustable head restraints and three-point inertia-reel seatbelts for all rear seats. It had been tested by Latin NCAP 3.5 in 2023 (similar to Euro NCAP 2014) and received 0 star because of unstable structure, weak frontal crash protection, lack of lateral head protection and lack of seatbelt reminder.

Latin NCAP 3.5 test results Citroen C3 + 2 Airbags (2023, similar to Euro NCAP 2017)
Test	Points	%
Overall:	0 /5 stars	
Adult occupant:	12.21	31%
Child occupant:	5.93	12%
Pedestrian:	23.88	50%
Safety assist:	15	35%

Latin NCAP 3.5 test results Citroen C3 Aircross / New Aircross + 2 Airbags (2024, similar to Euro NCAP 2017)
Test	Points	%
Overall:	0 /5 stars	
Adult occupant:	13.20	33%
Child occupant:	5.57	11%
Pedestrian:	23.79	50%
Safety assist:	15.00	35%

==== Awards ====
In 2023, the Indian and Latin American Citroën C3 won the World Urban Car of the Year.

==== Sales ====
Year	India	Brazil	Argentina	Uruguay	Indonesia
2022	5,686	10,834	≈340	528	
2023		26,581	4,261	1,507	
2024		21,081			488
2025		13,302			

== Fourth generation (CC21; 2024) ==
Fourth generation
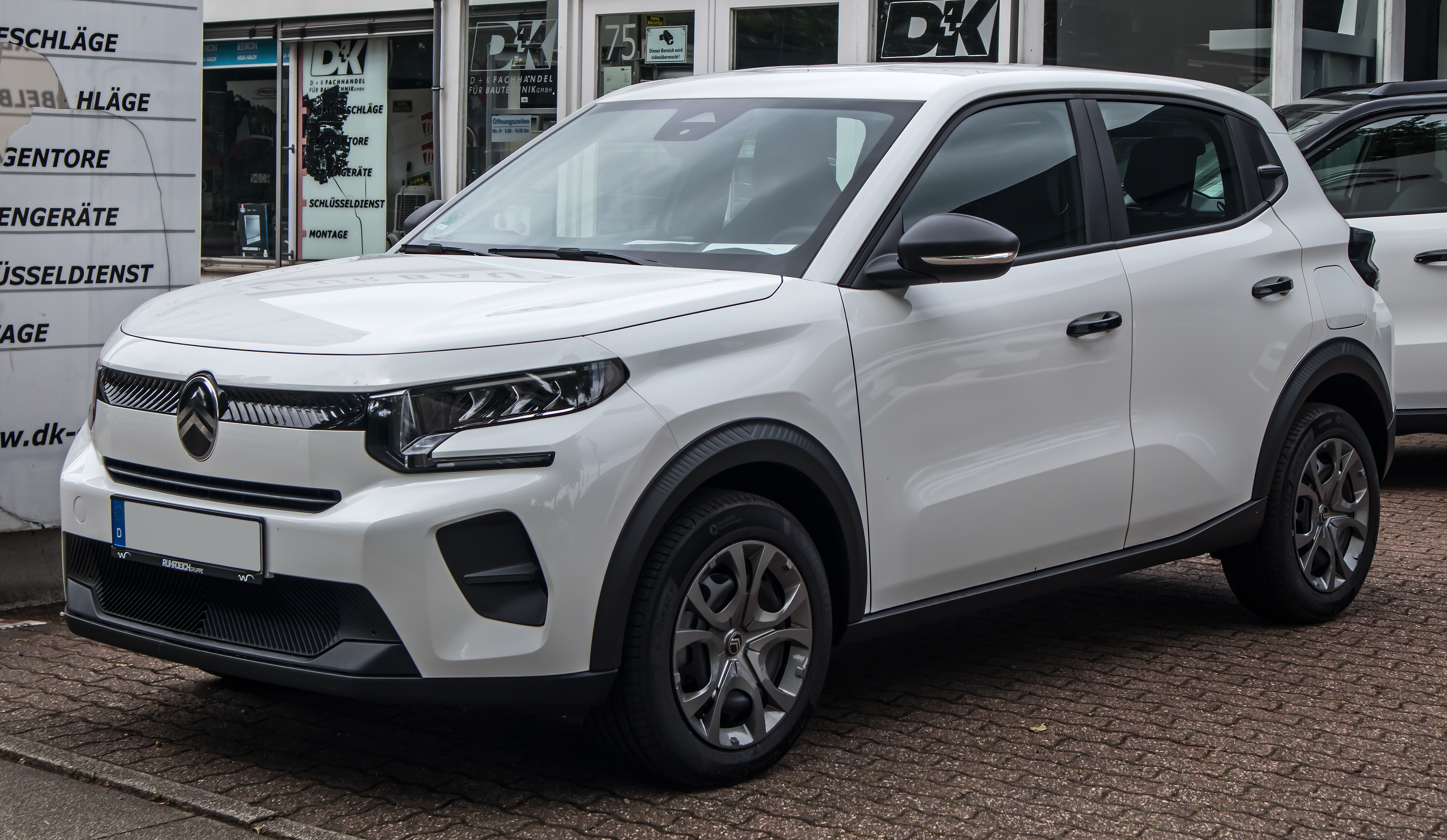
- 2024 Citroën C3

Overview
- Also called: Citroën ë-C3 (electric)
- Production: 2024–present
- Assembly: Slovakia: Trnava; Serbia: Kragujevac

Body and chassis
- Body style: 5-door hatchback
- Platform: Smart Car Platform
- Related: Citroën C3 Aircross (CC24); Opel Frontera; Fiat Grande Panda

Powertrain
- Engine: Petrol: 1.2 (EB2FAMK) I3; 1.2 (EB2FAMKd) I3; 1.2 THP (EB2LTED) I3; Petrol hybrid: 1.2 THP (EB2LTEDH2) I3 mild hybrid
- Electric motor: Permanent magnet synchronous (ë-C3)
- Power output: 74 kW (101 PS; 99 hp)
- Transmission: 5-speed manual; 6-speed manual; 6-speed dual-clutch automatic
- Hybrid drivetrain: Mild-Hybrid EV
- Battery: 0.43 KWh (Hybrid); 30 kWh LFP (ë-C3); 44 kWh LFP (ë-C3)
- Electric range: 320 km (199 mi) (WLTP, ë-C3)
- Plug-in charging: 7 kW (AC); 100 kW (DC)

Dimensions
- Wheelbase: 2,540 mm (100.0 in)
- Length: 4,015 mm (158.1 in)
- Width: 1,813 mm (71.4 in)
- Height: 1,577 mm (62.1 in)
- Kerb weight: 1,151–1,416 kg (2,538–3,122 lb)

The European market fourth-generation C3 was introduced on 17 October 2023 and started production in 2024. The model is based on the Smart Car Platform, which will underpin seven models produced by Stellantis in the future. It is described as a more efficient alternative to other STLA modular architectures with focus on battery electric models.

The C3 is the first model to feature Citroën's new design language and new logo, which were both previewed by the Oli Concept in 2022.

It features the C-Zen Lounge concept with Citroën's Heads Up Display (which replaces the traditional instrument cluster) and a flat bottom design steering wheel.

For the first time in history, the C3 is equipped with Citroën Advanced Comfort Suspension along with new Citroën Advanced Comfort Seats.

The design of the fourth-generation C3 resembles crossover SUVs, with a 163 mm (6.4 in) ground clearance, 28 mm (1.1 in) higher than its predecessor. The C3 also features a higher roof line, which creates a larger cabin with 30 mm (1.2 in) additional front headroom and 20 mm (0.8 in) of added rear knee room, despite being only 19 mm (0.7 in) longer and 6 mm (0.2 in) wider.

The ë-C3 is equipped with a 44 kWh lithium iron phosphate (LFP) battery capable of an electric range of up to 320 km (199 mi) measured by the WLTP cycle. The 83 kW (113 PS; 111 hp) electric motor allows the vehicle to reach 0–100 km/h (0–62 mph) in around 11 seconds.

Citroen simplified the fourth-generation C3 with two trim levels and few optional extras. The only customisable options are the exterior colour, space for a spare wheel on petrol and hybrid models, and a three-phase charger on the ë-C3.

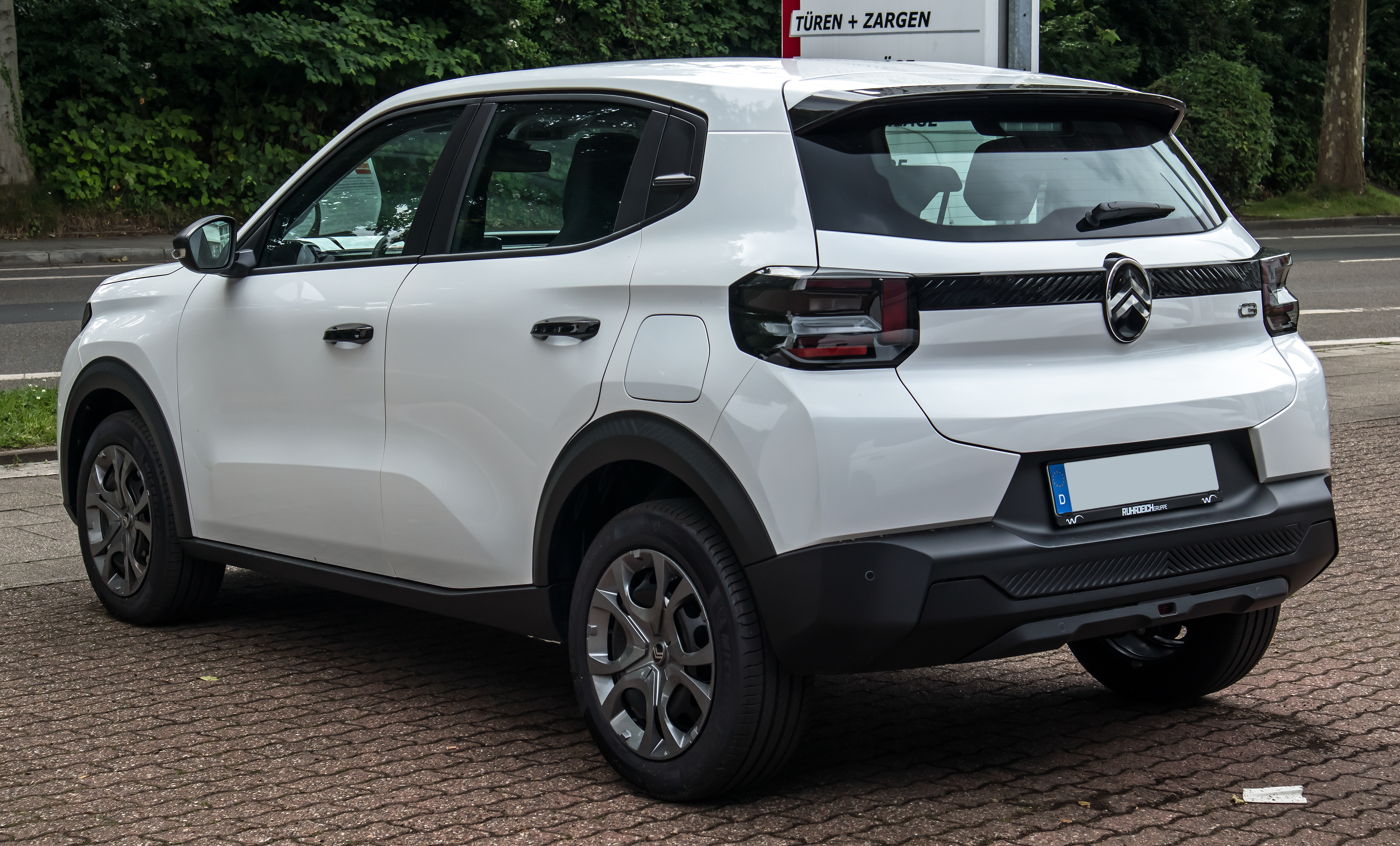
Rear view

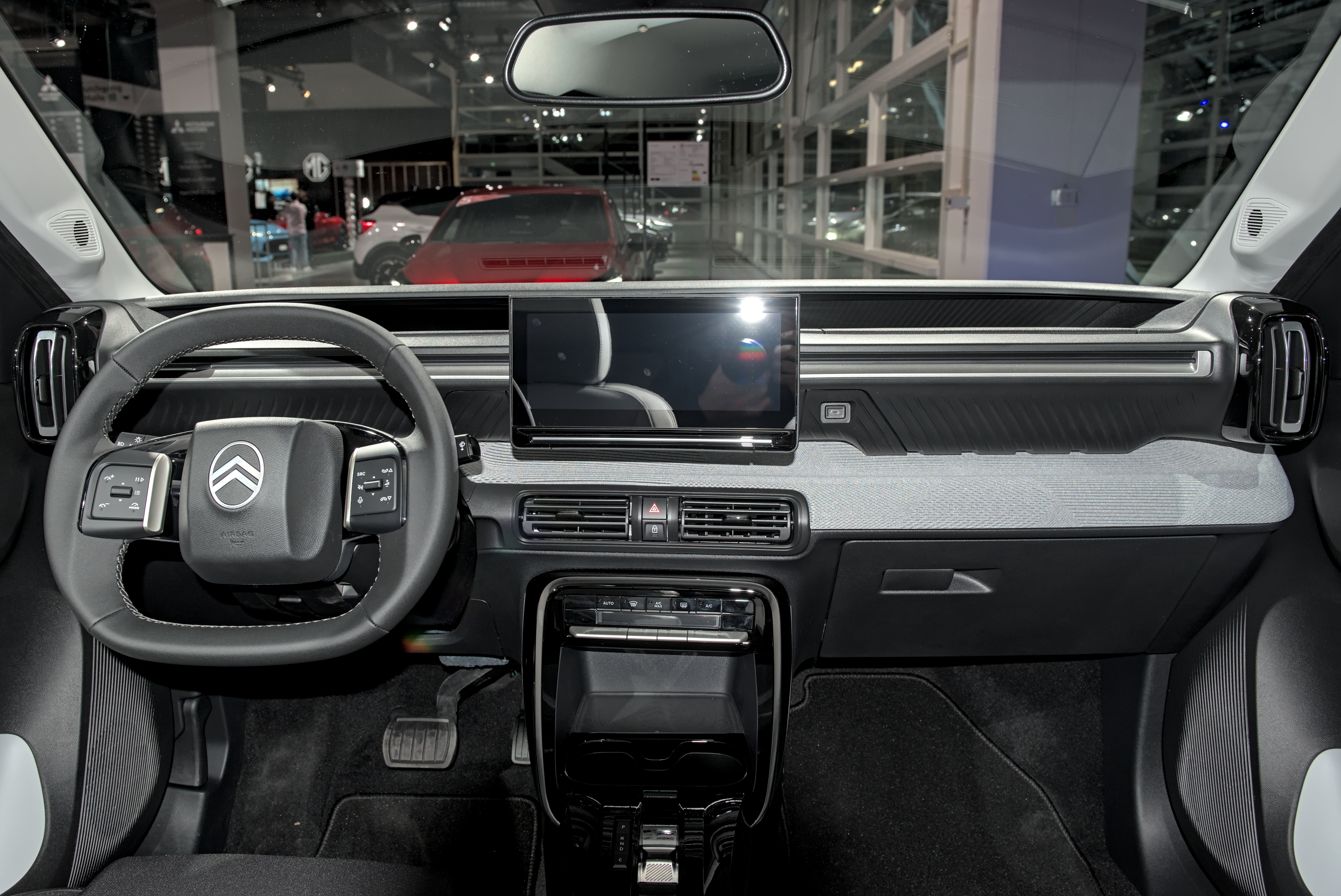
Interior

=== Engines and transmissions ===
Petrol engines
Model	Year	Engine	Displacement	Power	Torque	0–100 km/h (0–62 mph)	Top speed	Transmission	CO_{2} emission (g/km)
1.2 Puretech Turbo	2024-present	I3	1199 cc	74 kW; 99 hp (100 PS) at 5500 rpm	205 N⋅m (151 lbf⋅ft) at 1750 rpm	10,6	183 km/h	6 speed manual	123

== Sales and production ==
Year	Europe	Brazil	Worldwide production	Worldwide sales	Notes
2001	1,298				
2002	136,530				
2003	290,666	4,164			
2004	285,858	7,801			
2005	247,175	12,791			
2006	210,880	22,272			
2007	201,083	29,508			
2008	170,036	35,837			
2009	168,507	33,547	233,400	226,700	
2010	230,093	39,918	311,200	308,300	
2011	181,950	37,576	353,593	255,312	Total production reached 3,113,192 units.
2012	150,203	34,928	293,000	215,800	Total production reached 3,406,200 units.
2013	113,625	33,672			
2014	129,612	28,745			
2015	123,443	17,032			
2016	133,566	11,827			
2017	205,272	9,883			
2018	208,941	6,379			
2019	210,465	2,858			
2020	149,284	968			
2021	156,904	41			
2022	143,358				

In May 2021, total production exceeded 4,500,000 units, including the 1-millionth third-generation C3 model.

== See also ==
- Citroën C3 Aircross
- Citroën C3 Picasso
