= Fiat Grande Panda =

Subcompact car

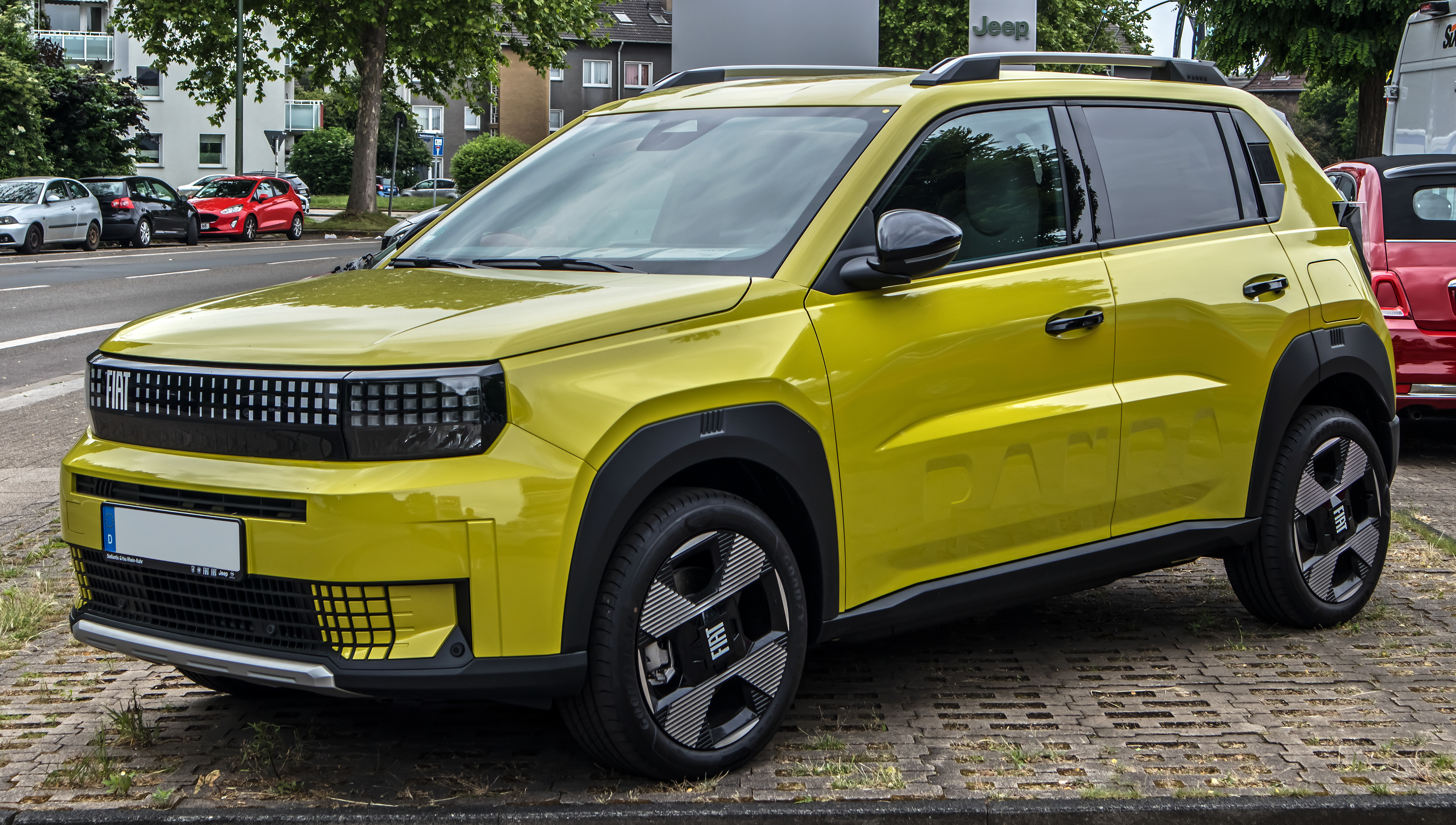

Overview
- Manufacturer: Fiat (Stellantis)
- Also called: Fiat Argo X (Brazil)
- Production: January 2025 – present
- Assembly: Serbia: Kragujevac (Fiat Serbia); Algeria: Tafraoui (Stellantis Tafraoui); Brazil: Betim (FCA do Brasil Ltda.)
- Designer: François Leboine at Centro Stile Fiat

Body and chassis
- Class: Supermini (B)
- Body style: 5-door hatchback
- Layout: Front-engine, front-wheel-drive; Front-motor, front-wheel-drive (EV)
- Platform: Stellantis Smart Car Platform
- Related: Fiat Grizzly; Citroën C3/ë-C3 (CC21); Opel Frontera

Powertrain
- Engine: 1.2 EB2LTEDH2 12v Turbo I3
- Electric motor: Permanent magnet synchronous (EV)
- Power output: 74–81 kW (101–110 PS; 99–109 hp); 83 kW (113 PS; 111 hp) (EV)
- Transmission: 6-speed manual 6-speed eDCT-6 automatic
- Hybrid drivetrain: Mild hybrid
- Battery: 44 kWh LFP (EV)
- Electric range: 320 km (199 mi) (WLTP, EV)

Dimensions
- Wheelbase: 2,540 mm (100.0 in)
- Length: 3,999 mm (157.4 in)
- Width: 1,760 mm (69.3 in)
- Height: 1,570 mm (61.8 in)
- Kerb weight: 1,220–1,554 kg (2,690–3,426 lb)

The Fiat Grande Panda is a supermini car produced by Fiat since January 2025. It is based on the Smart Car platform shared with the fourth-generation Citroën C3 and Opel Frontera, and is available as a petrol, mild hybrid, or as a battery-electric vehicle. The Fiat Grande Panda will be sold alongside the third-generation Panda, which will continue production in Italy.

== Overview ==
The fourth-generation Panda was presented on 14 June 2024, with the interior and full specifications later revealed on 11 July coinciding with Fiat's 125th anniversary "Smiling to the Future” ceremony held at the La Pista 500 at the Lingotto building in Turin, Italy.

Based on the Smart Car Platform, the Grande Panda is the first of the Panda model series, with a few models under the Panda model series planned to launch.

=== Design ===
The design of the Grande Panda takes inspiration from the first generation model with the use of squared lines, it has a number of design references to the original model and retains many design elements from the Mega-Panda concept.

Except for the basic 'Pop' version, the front features headlights composed of opaline cubes that are inspired from the windows of the Lingotto factory facades and has X-shaped LED daytime running lights which can illuminate the cubes on the gloss black grille. The side features embossed bas-relief 'Panda' lettering on the lower part of the doors and x-pattern alloy wheels (not on basic versions, with sizes ranging up to 17-inch). The rear features 3D vertical taillights housed inside transparent caps, the Fiat name embossed onto the tailgate and a sloped rear windscreen.

The Grande Panda is the first production vehicle to feature an integrated charging cable which is stored behind the flap with the Fiat logo on the front fascia. This charging cable can only support AC charging with speeds up to 7.4 kW.

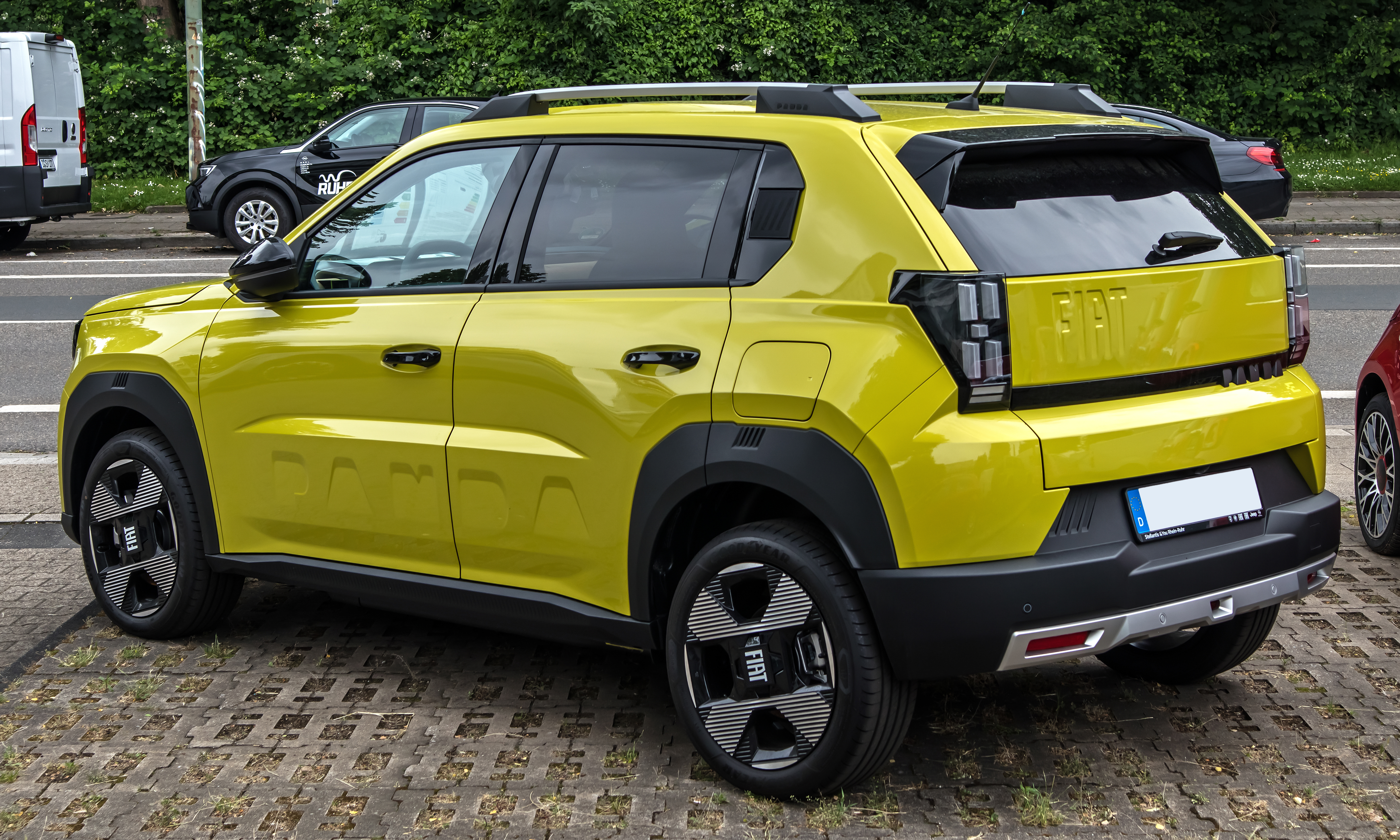
Rear view

=== Interior ===
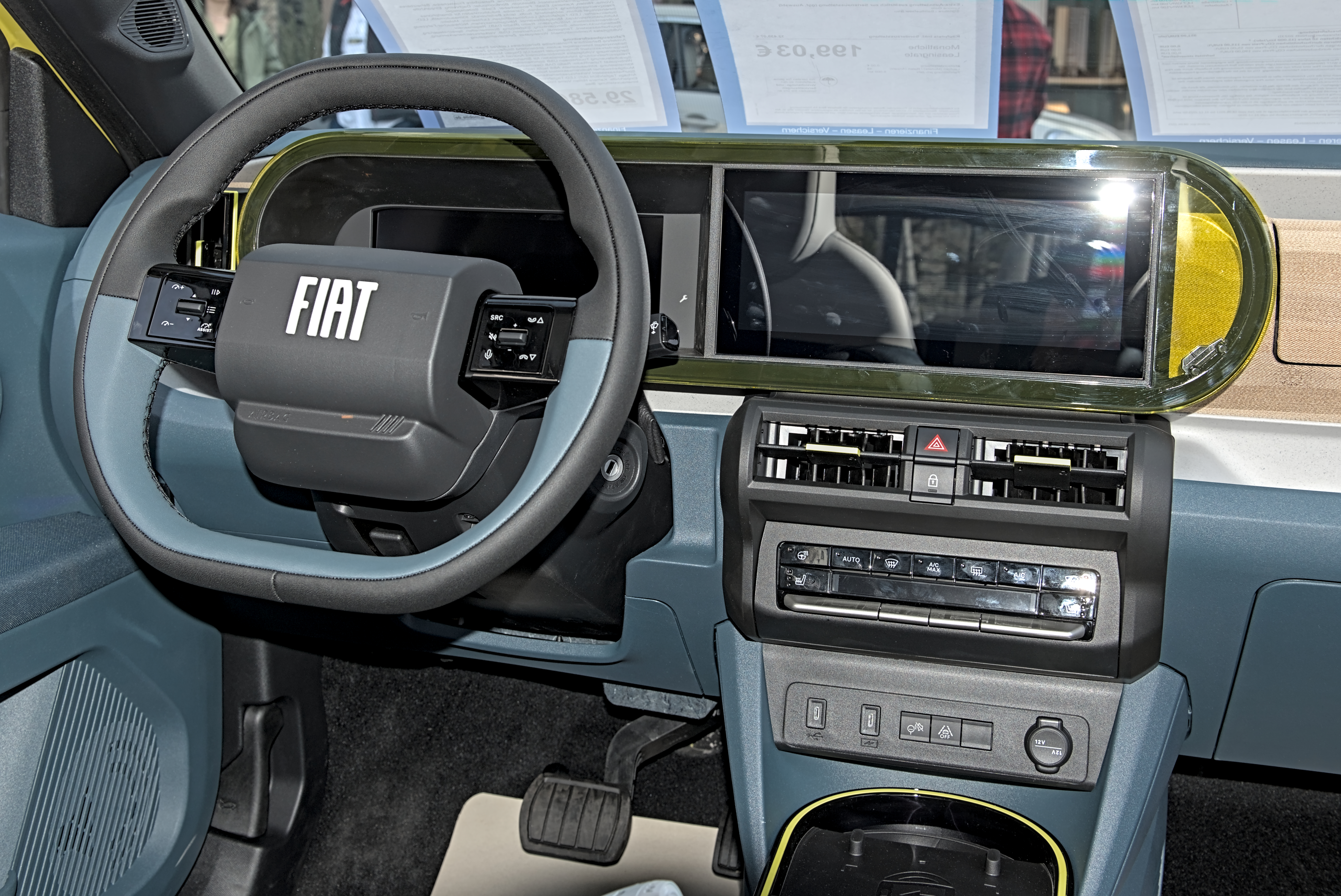
Interior

The interior dashboard features a rectangular element with rounded sides inspired by the shape of the Lingotto circuit in Turin and the oval theme is repeated throughout the interior.

The same rectangular shape houses the 10-inch digital instrument cluster and 10.25-inch touchscreen infotainment display. In the centre of the dashboard, the transparent yellow panel features the silhouette of the original Panda model climbing uphill. Part of the dashboard is covered in bamboo fibre (not in basic versions), including the glove box. Other interior items are a rocker switch used for the automatic transmission in the central console, two USB-C charging ports for the front occupants and the classic metal key for the ignition.

There are several yellow decorative elements marking the contours of the air vents, dashboard and centre console. A range of contrasting materials are used such as textured fabrics, tinted acrylics and brighter coloured plastics. The front and rear seats have a chequered finish, with contrast yellow stitching and an inscription in yellow that reads, "Panda made with love in Fiat".

The interior has up to 13 L (0.46 cu ft) of storage space, including the "pocket" retrospective to the original model in the form of an upper glovebox. The Grande Panda has a boot space of 412 L (14.5 cu ft), it is 60% larger compared to its predecessor.

== Fiat Argo X ==
On 11 November 2026, Fiat revealed the first official images of the Argo X, a new compact hatchback developed for Brazil and based on the European Grande Panda. The images preview the model's production styling ahead of its planned launch in late 2026 or early 2027.

The official photographs show an uncamouflaged car in Pistacchio Green, with the same pixel-style front and rear lighting that forms an illuminated "X" motif and black lower-body cladding giving the hatchback a crossover-inspired appearance.

The Argo X is closely related to the European Grande Panda, but includes Brazil-specific exterior and interior changes, including centered Fiat badges on the front grille and tailgate, absence of the name "Panda" and emblems engraved on the plate and exclusive interior styling for Latin America — more sober and conservative, inspired by the Fiat Grizzly.

It is expected to be produced at Stellantis's Betim plant in Minas Gerais and will initially be sold alongside the existing Fiat Argo. Fiat has not yet announced the Argo X's full technical specifications, equipment, pricing, or exact on-sale date.
