= Common Modular Platform =

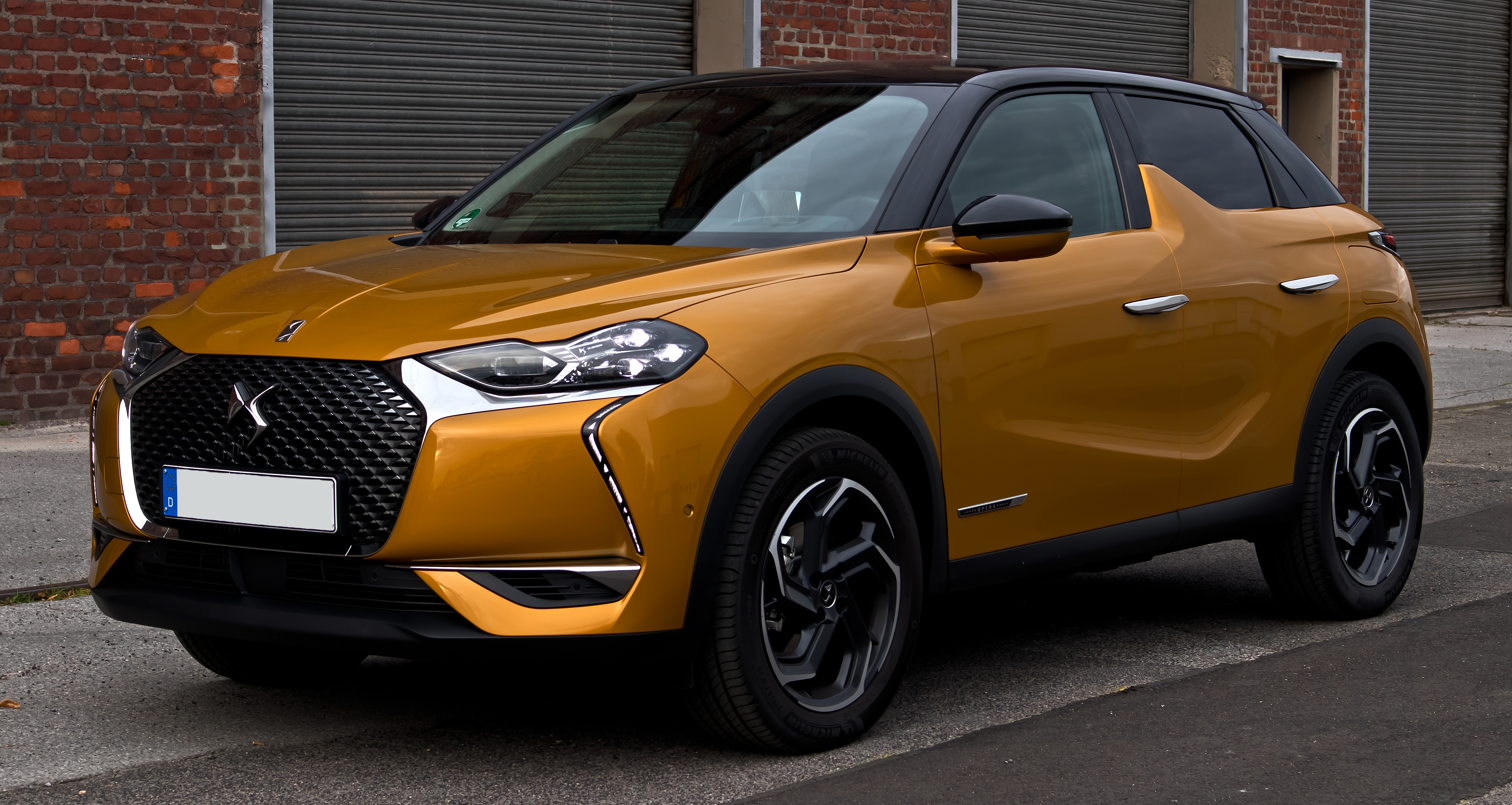
- The DS 3 (formerly DS 3 Crossback) was the first vehicle to have this platform.

Overview
- Manufacturer: PSA Group (2018-2021); Stellantis (2021-present)
- Also called: EMP1
- Production: 2018–present

Body and chassis
- Class: Subcompact car/supermini (B-segment); Compact car/small family car (C-segment)
- Layout: Front-engine, front-wheel-drive; Front-motor, front-wheel-drive (eCMP); Front-engine, all-wheel-drive (Jeep); Dual-motor, all-wheel-drive (eCMP, Jeep)

Chronology
- Predecessor: PSA PF1 platform; SCCS platform; General Motors Gamma platform

The Common Modular Platform (CMP), also known as EMP1, is a modular car platform which is jointly developed and used by French car manufacturer PSA, now Stellantis, and Chinese car manufacturer Dongfeng. It debuted in 2018 with the release of the DS 3 Crossback, the platform is mainly used by B-segment (supermini or subcompact) vehicles along with some entry level C-segment vehicles. For larger cars from the C-segment above, PSA uses the Efficient Modular Platform (EMP2).

The CMP offers a high level of modularity with a choice of two track widths, three wheelbase lengths, three rear modules and the capability to offer several wheel diameters, allowing engineers and designers to introduce a broad range of body styles, from hatchbacks and saloons to SUVs. It has been extended for battery-electric vehicles as e-CMP and e-CMP2.

== History ==
PSA and Dongfeng agreed to begin developing the new platform in March 2014. In 2015, it was reported that both PSA and Dongfeng would spend €200,000,000 on the platform project with 60 percent of the expenditure committed by PSA, with the remaining 40 percent from Dongfeng. A team of Dongfeng engineers was part of the project team based at PSA's main R&D centre in Velizy, south of Paris.

PSA and Dongfeng also announced their collaboration on the design for e-CMP, an all-electric platform extending their work on CMP. e-CMP had a targeted range of 450 km (280 mi) with charging speeds replenishing range at up to 12 km (7.5 mi) per minute. The first e-CMP vehicles were scheduled to release in 2019.

== Applications ==
=== CMP ===
- Alfa Romeo Junior (2024-present)
- Lancia Ypsilon (2024–present)
- Citroën C4 III (2020–present)
  - Citroën C4 X (2022–present)
- Dongfeng Aeolus Yixuan (2019–present)
- Dongfeng Aeolus Yixuan GS (2020–present)
- DS 3 Crossback (2018–present)
- Fiat 600 (2023–present)
- Jeep Avenger (2023–present)
- Opel Corsa F (2019–present)
- Opel Mokka B (2020–present)
- Peugeot 208 II (2019–present)
- Peugeot 2008 II (2019–present)
* IKCO Reera (2024–present)
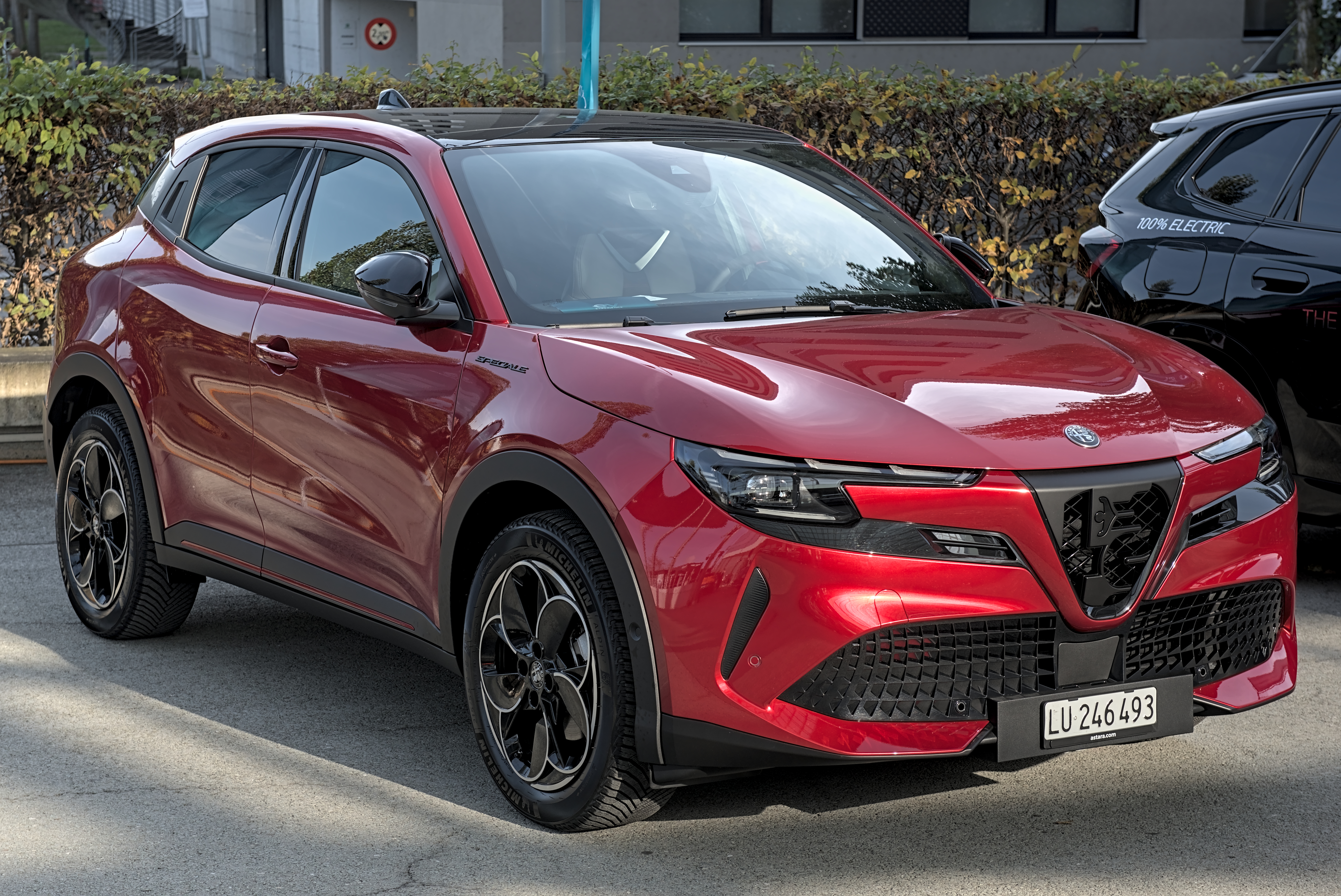
Alfa Romeo Junior

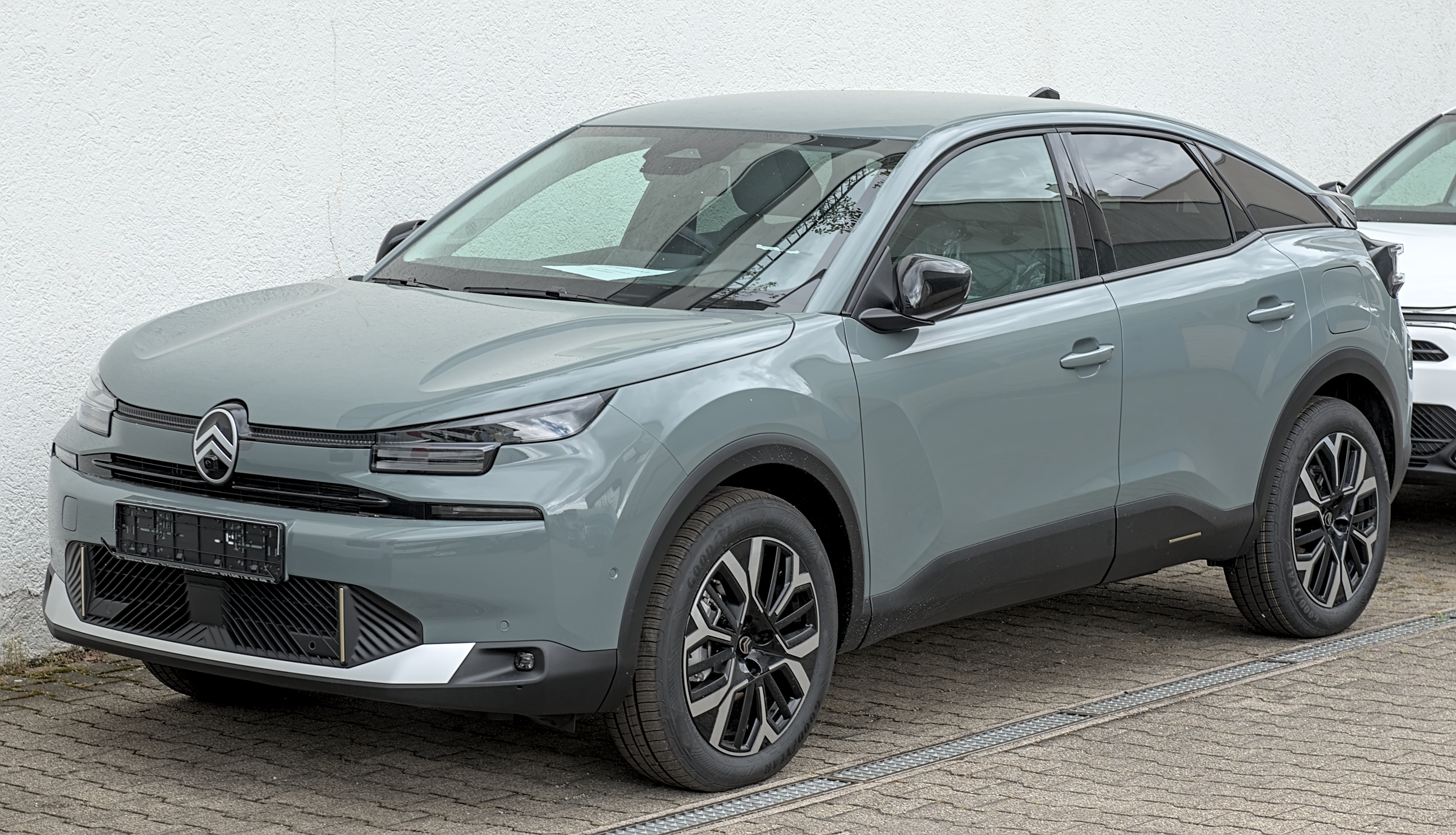
Citroën C4

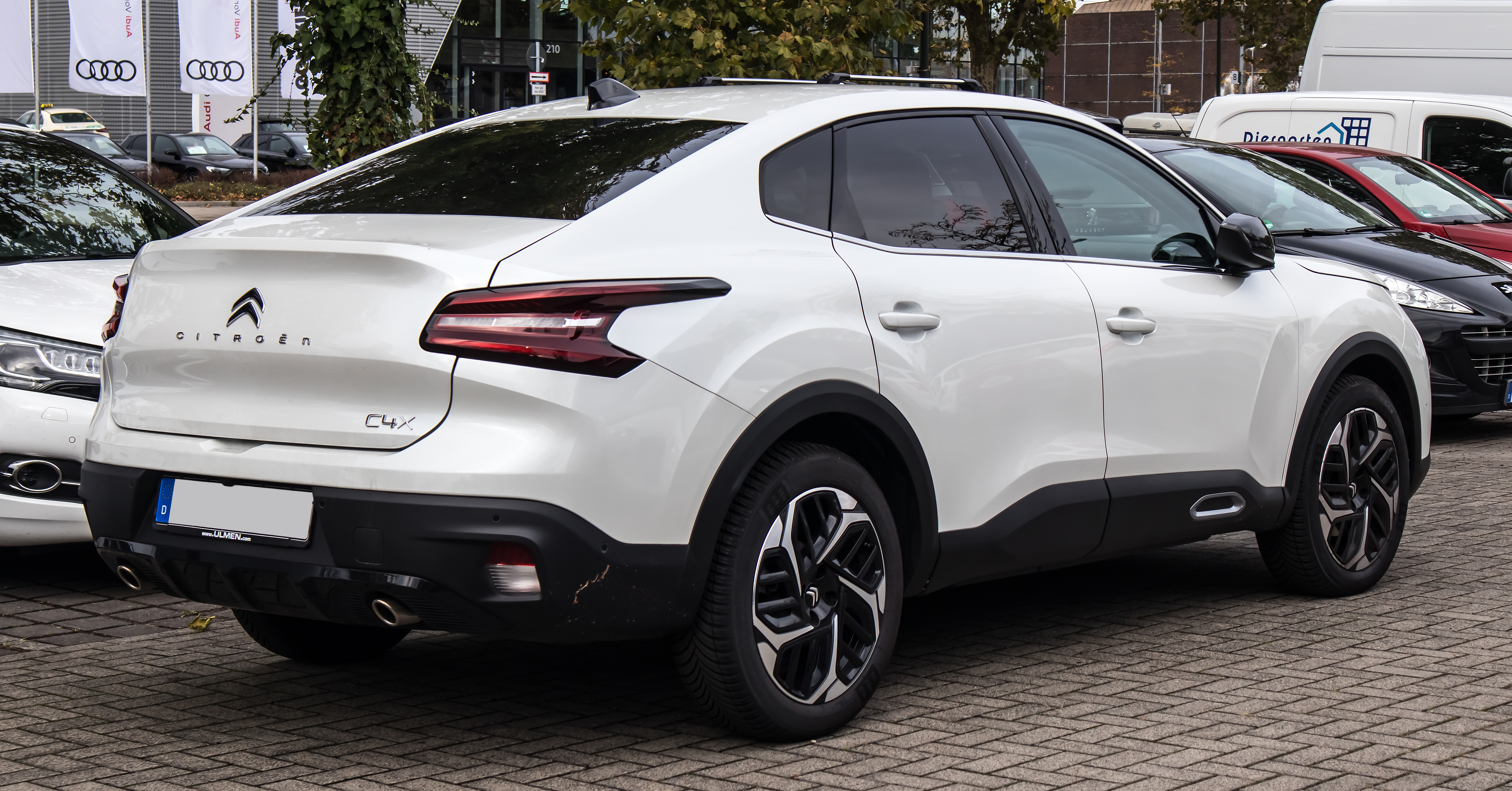
Citroën C4 X

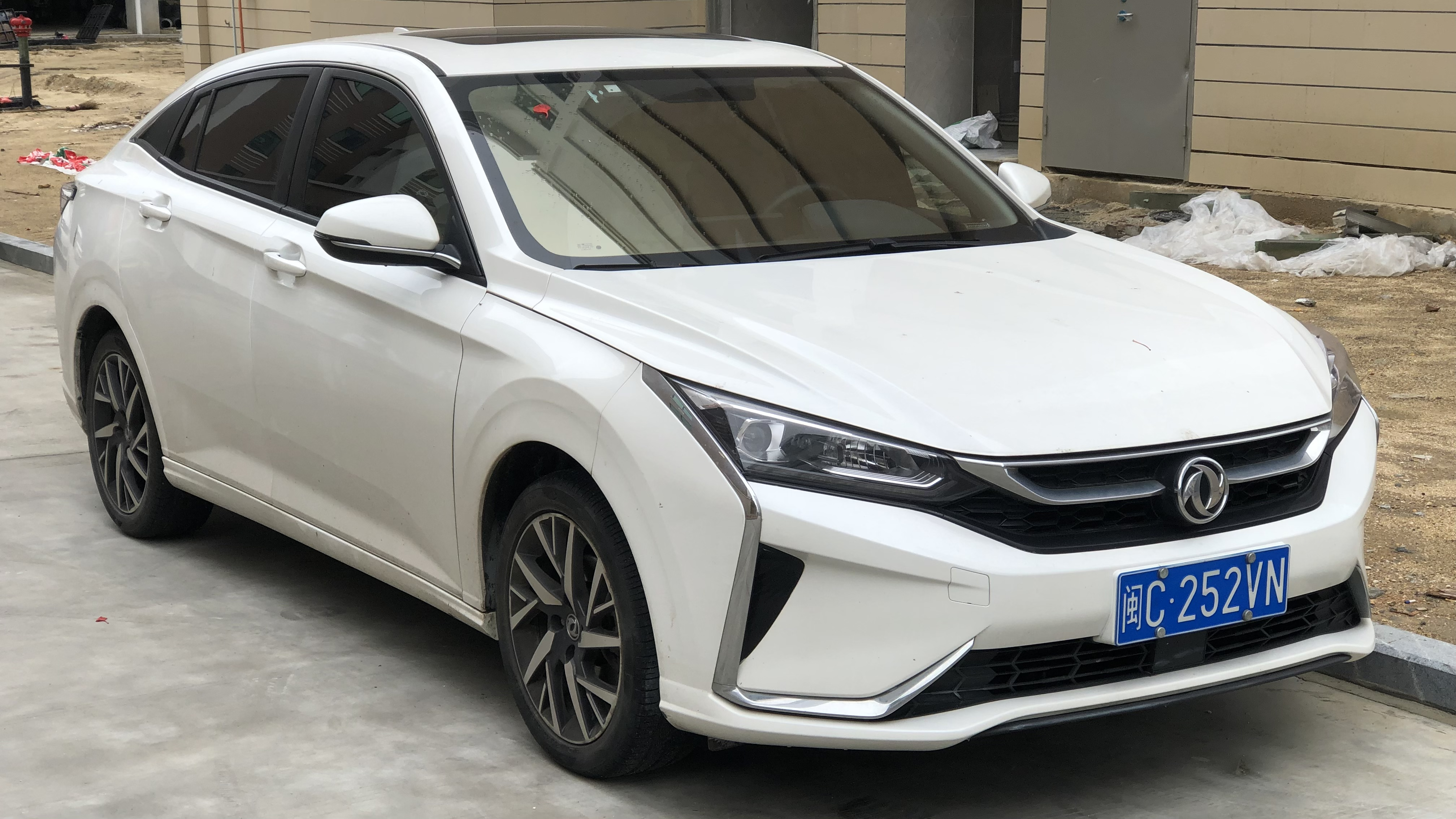
Dongfeng Aeolus Yixuan

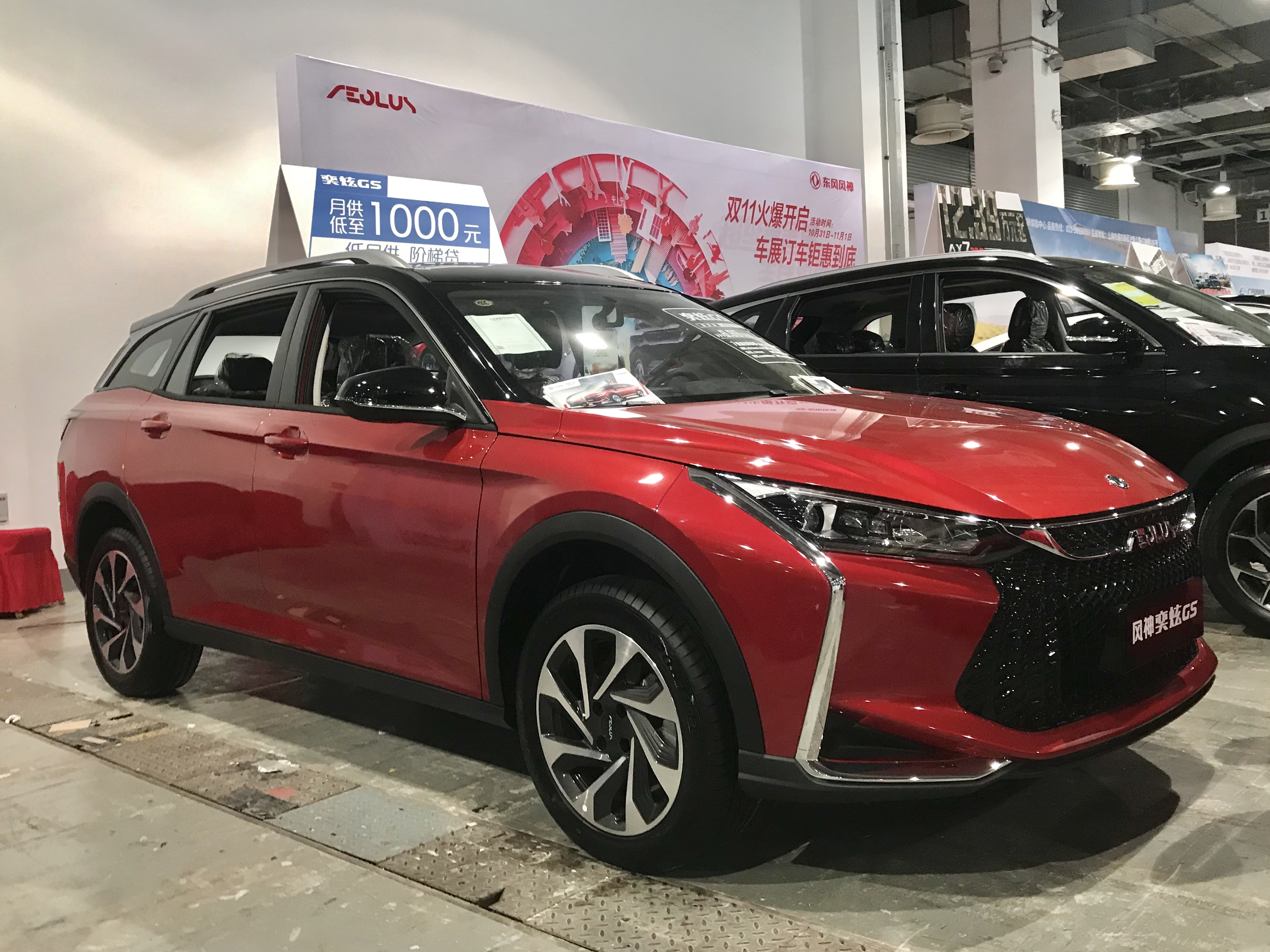
Dongfeng Aeolus Yixuan GS

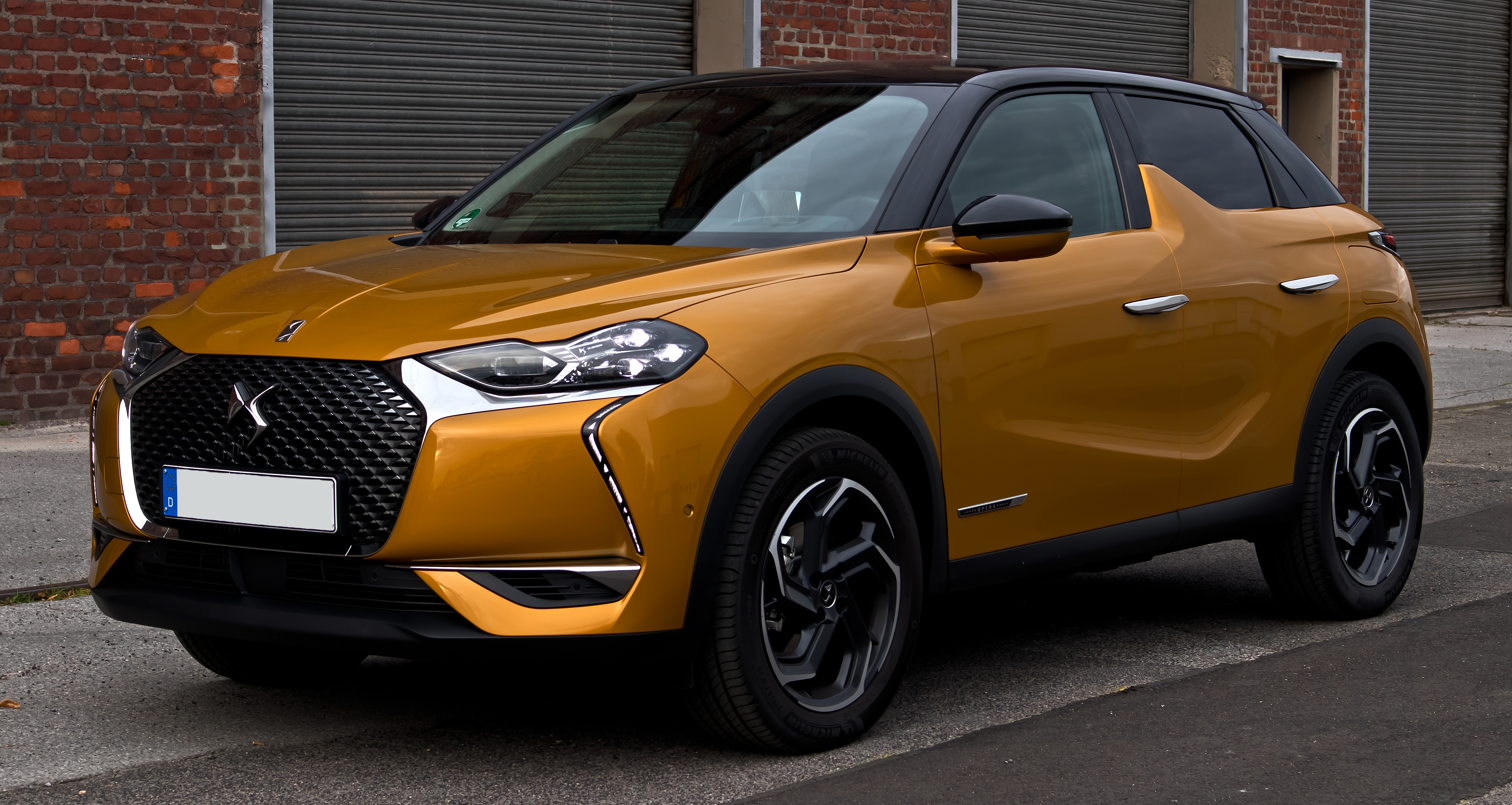
DS 3 Crossback

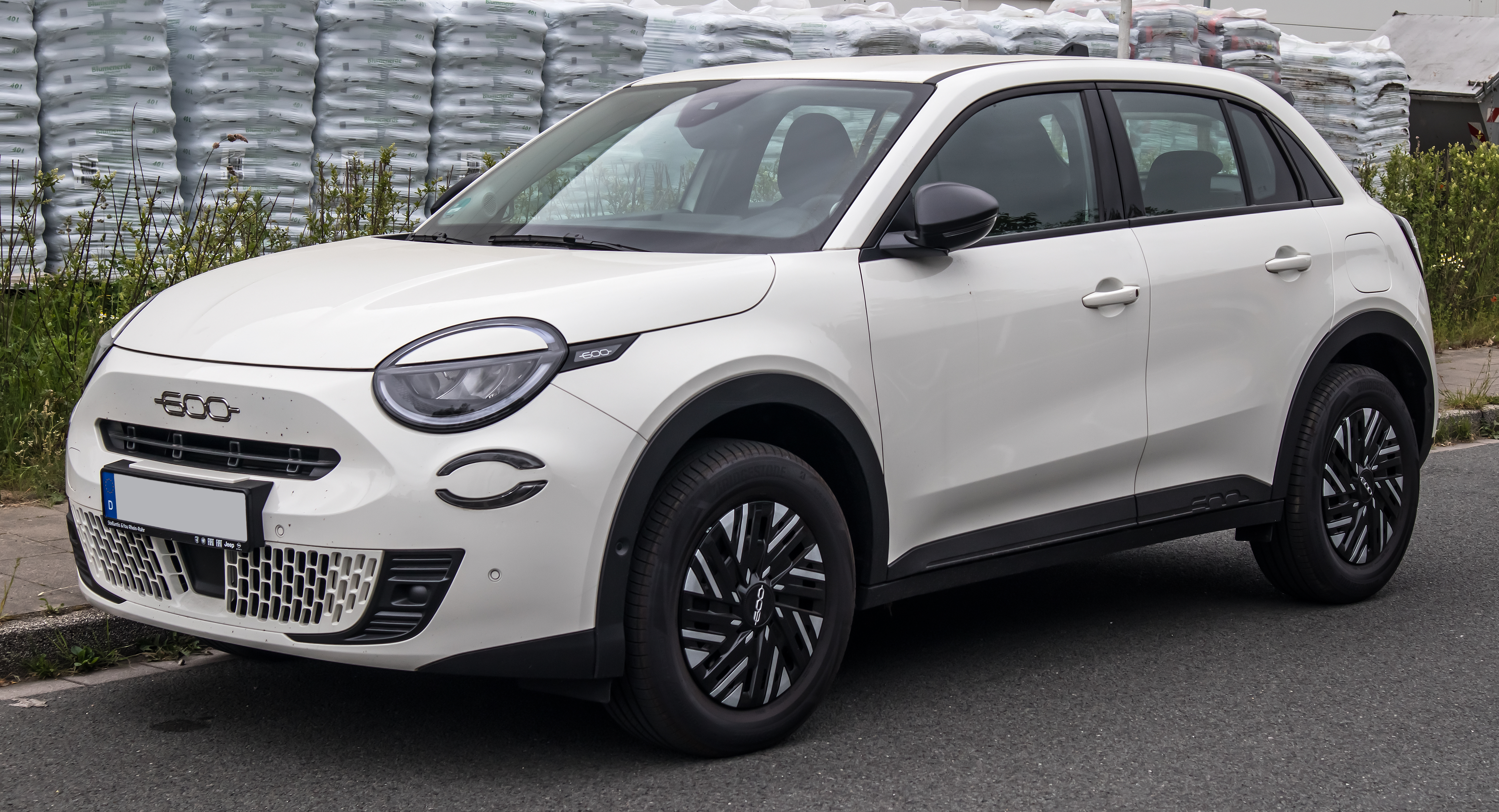
Fiat 600

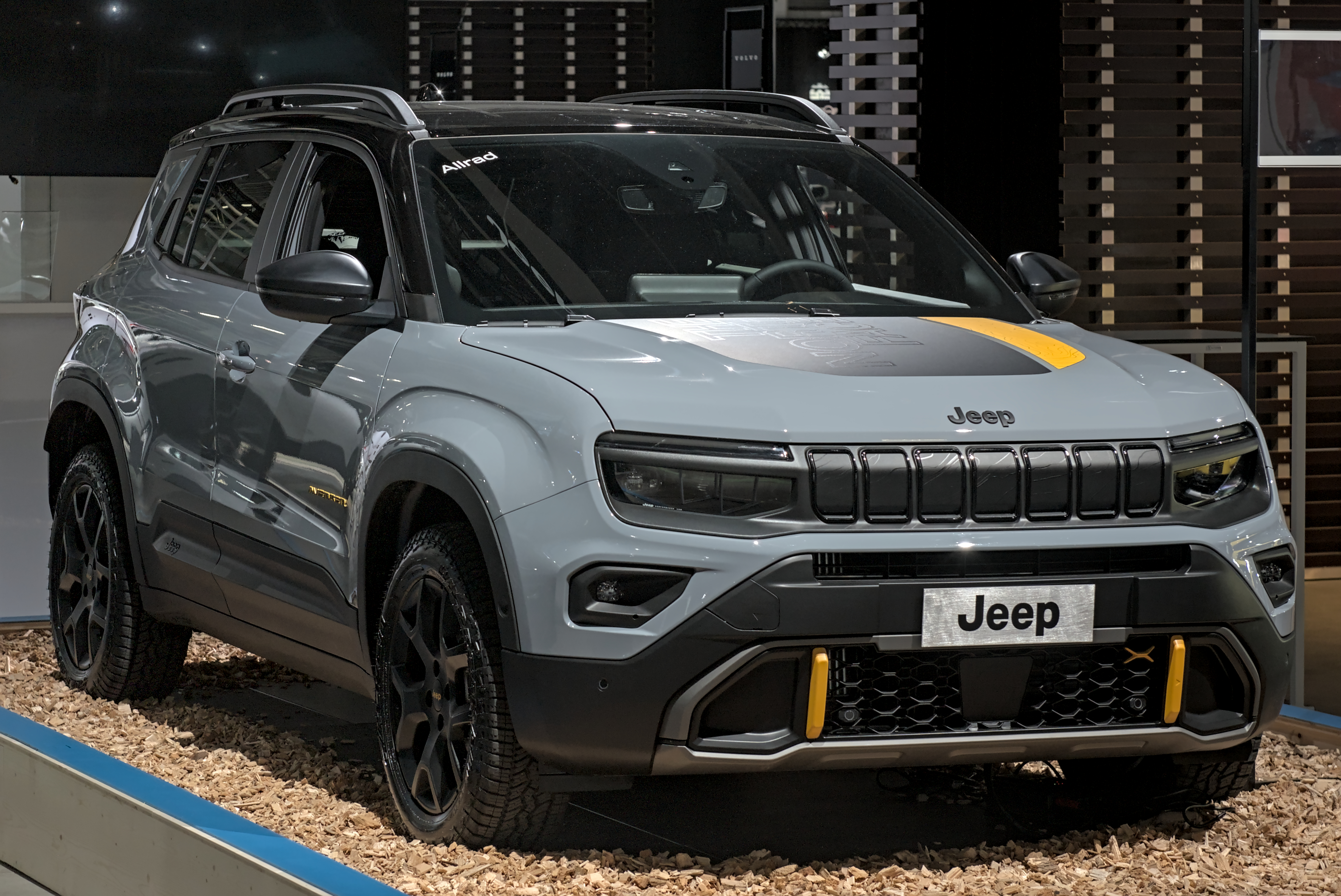
Jeep Avenger

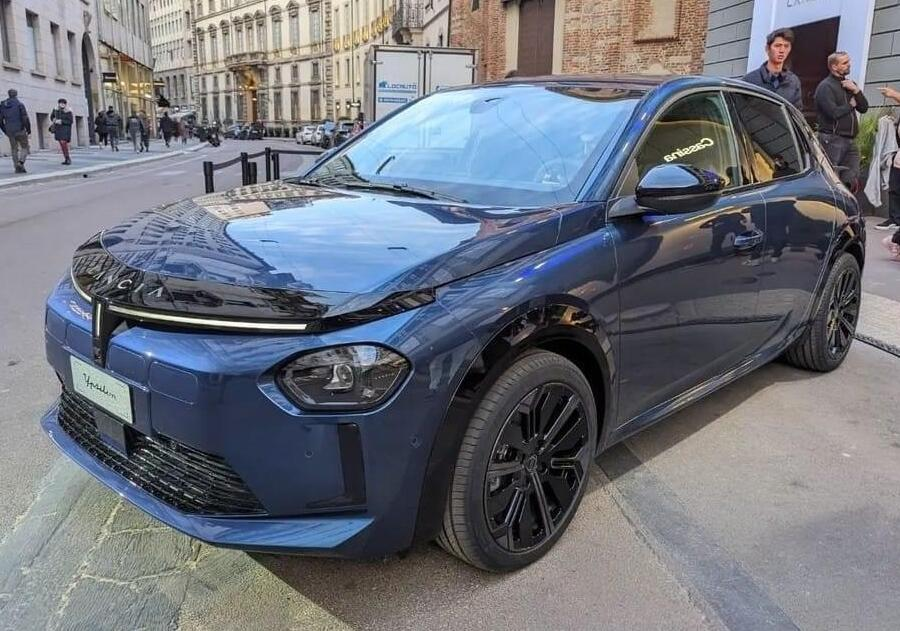
Lancia Ypsilon

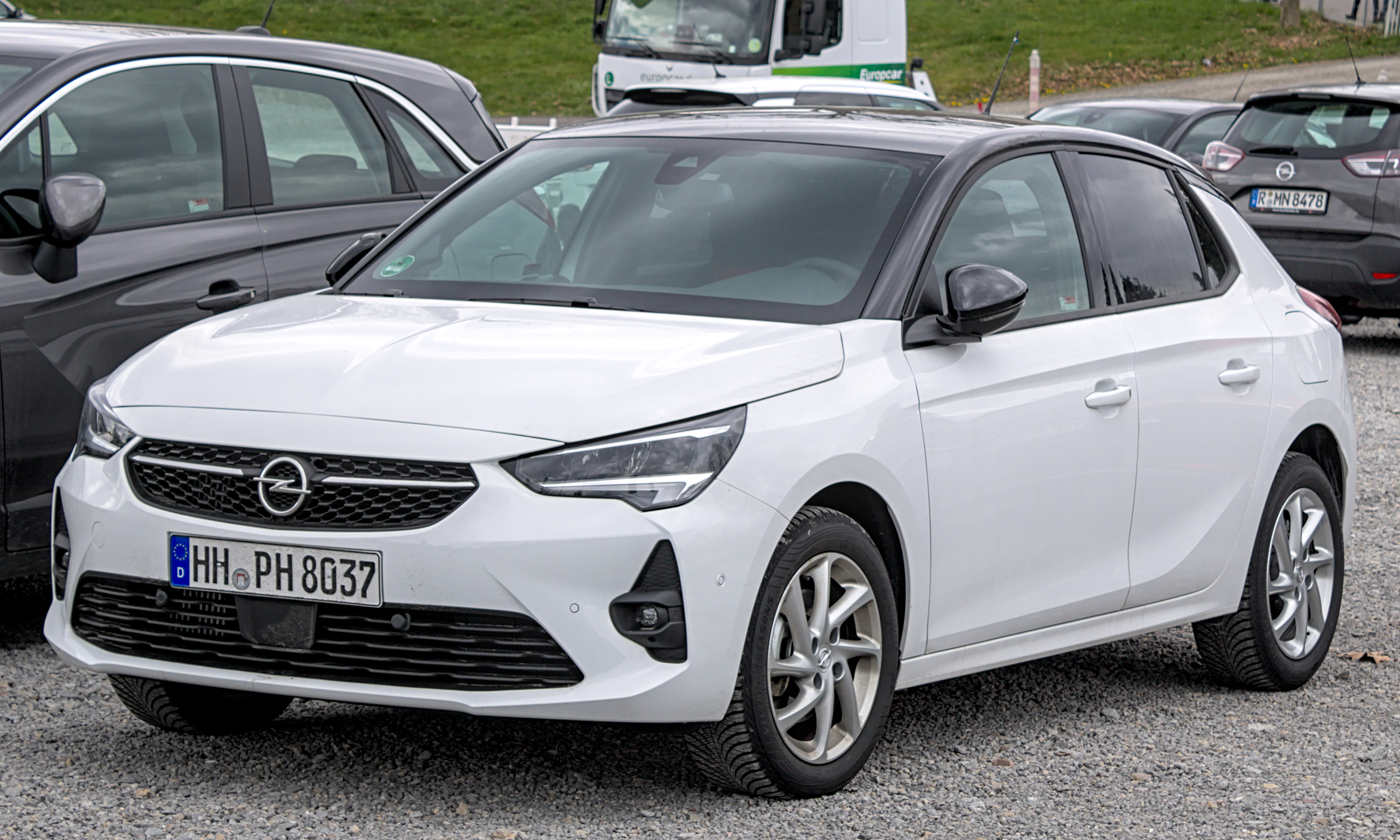
Opel Corsa (F)

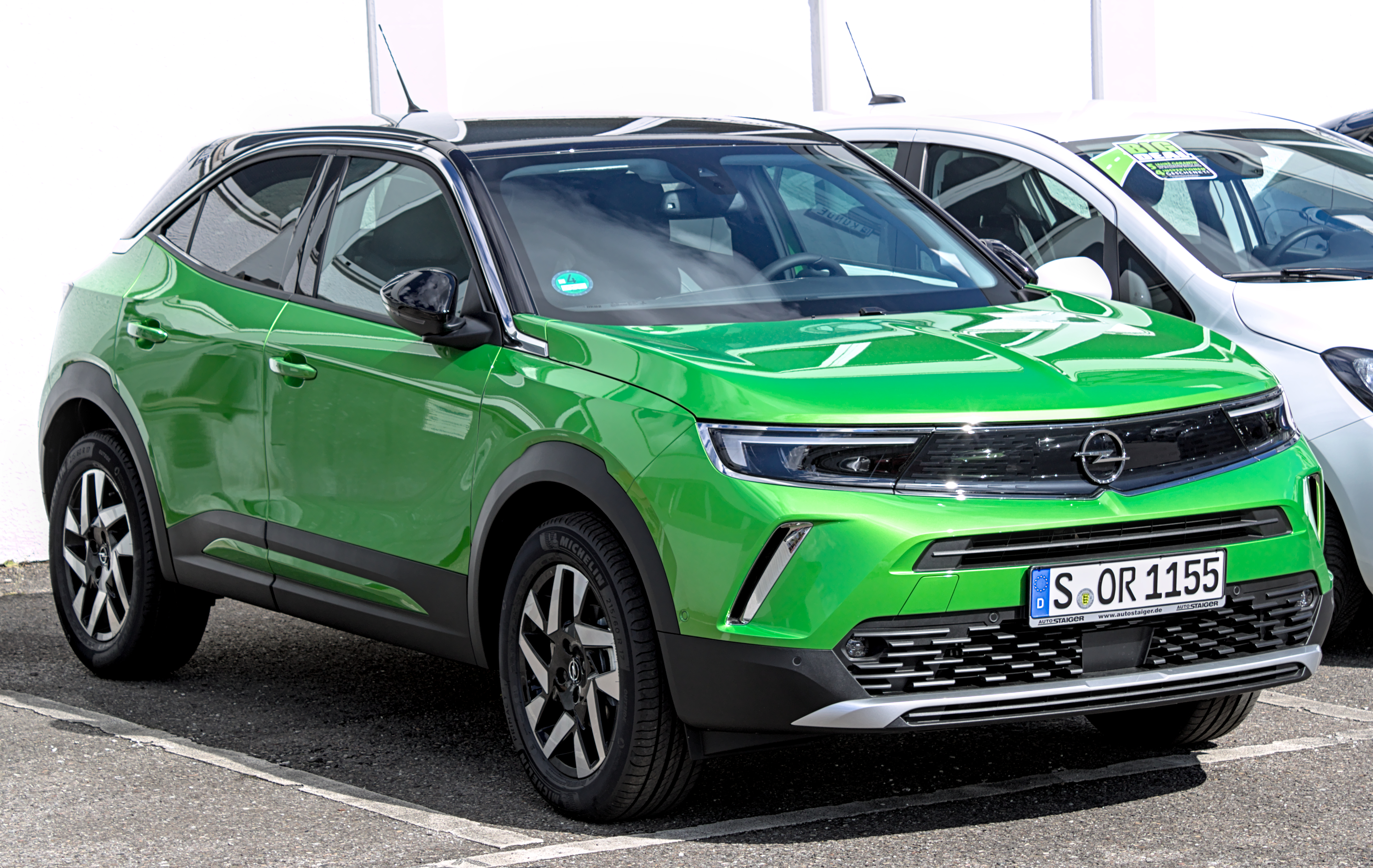
Opel Mokka (B)

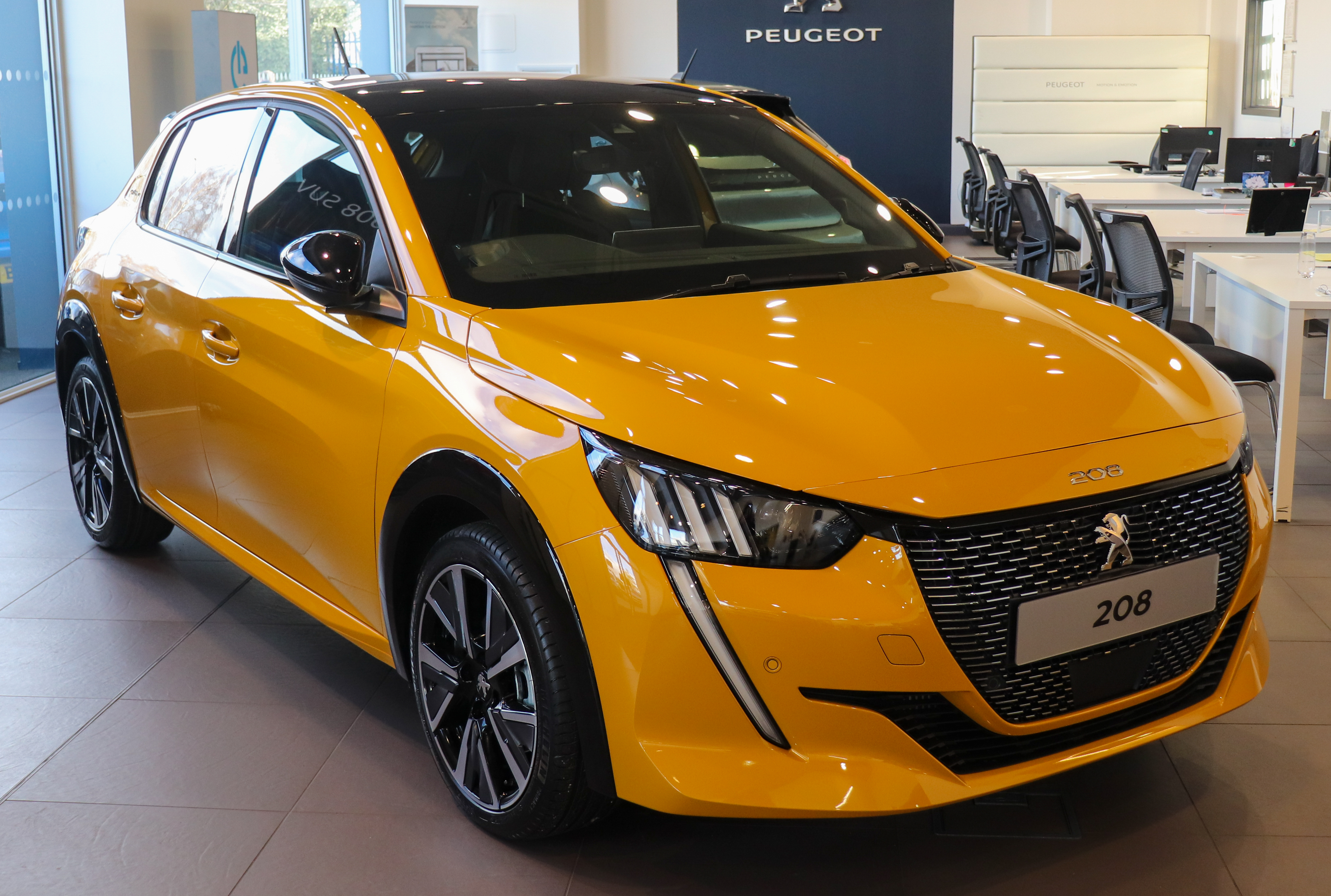
Peugeot 208 (B)

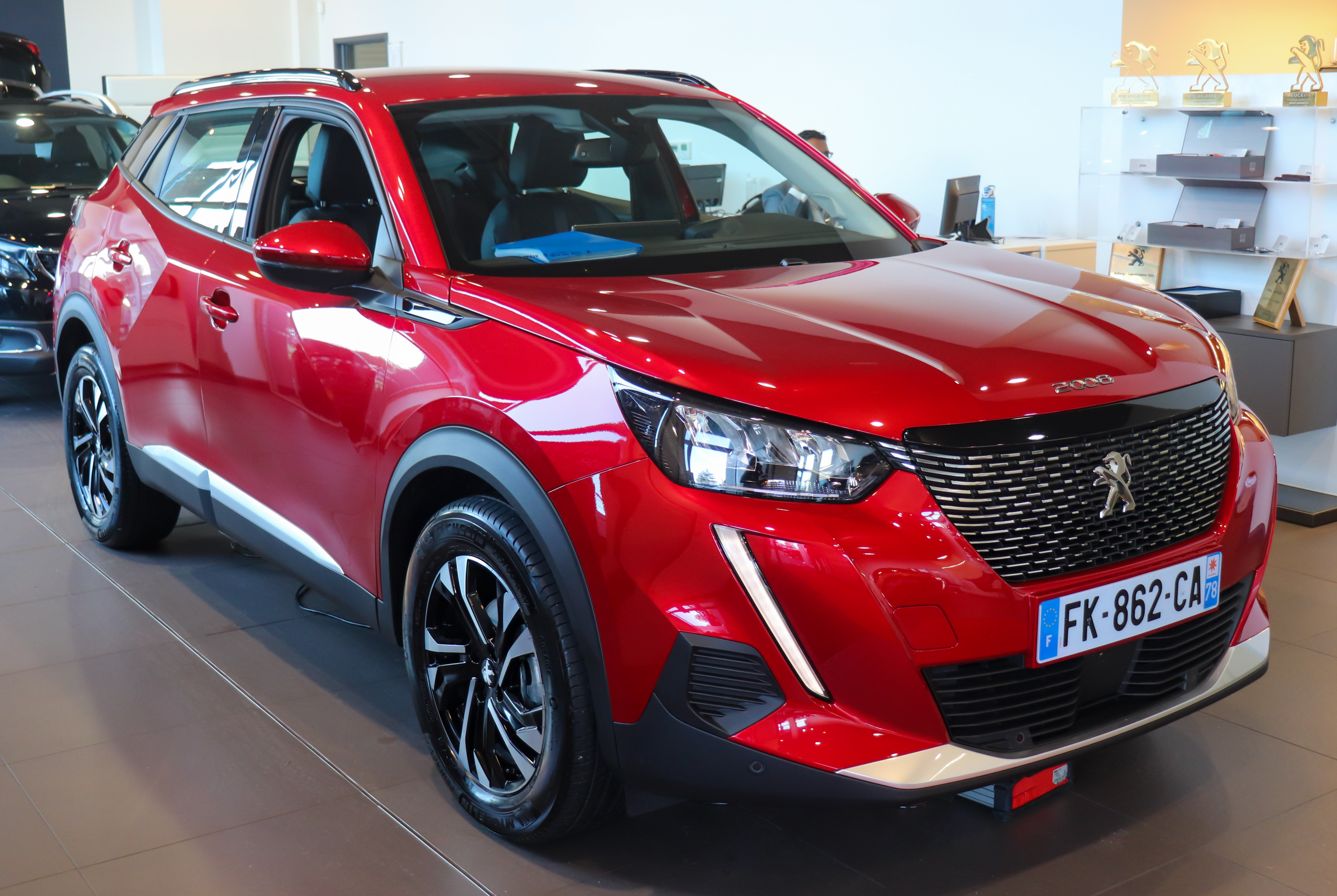
Peugeot 2008 (B)

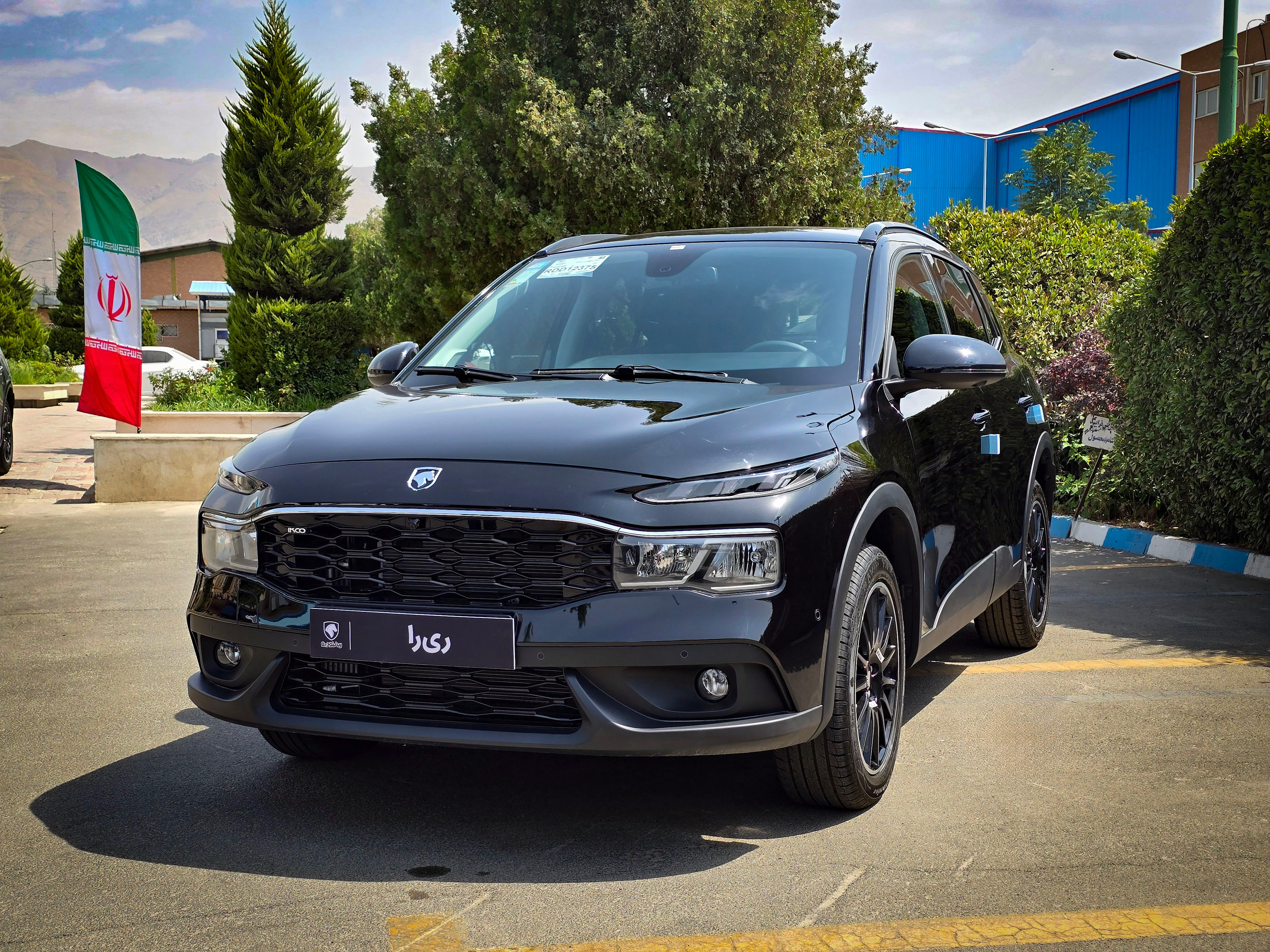
IKCO Reera

=== e-CMP ===
The CMP is also designed for battery electric vehicle under the name e-CMP, which can be produced in the same assembly line. The first-generation e-CMP vehicles are equipped with a 100 kW (136 PS; 134 hp) electric motor, a 50 kWh gross (46.3 kWh net) lithium-ion battery pack and a high-performance heat pump.

The second generation of e-CMP includes a traction motor, the eMotors M3, with an increased output of 115 kW (156 PS; 154 hp) and 260 N⋅m (190 lbf⋅ft) along with improved efficiency. This traction motor is the first produced by eMotors, a joint venture between Stellantis and Nidec. Second generation e-CMP vehicles also have greater battery capacity with a 54 kWh (51 kWh net) lithium-ion battery using NMC chemistry.

- Citroën ë-C4 (2020–present)
  - Citroën ë-C4 X (2022–present)
- Dongfeng Aeolus Yixuan EV (2019–present)
- DS 3 Crossback E-Tense (2019–present)
- Opel Corsa-e (2019–present)
- Opel Mokka-e (2020–present)
- Peugeot e-208 (2020–present)
- Peugeot e-2008 (2019–present)
- Fiat 600e (2023–present)
- Jeep Avenger EV (2023–present)
- Lancia Ypsilon (2024–present)
- Alfa Romeo Junior (2024–present)
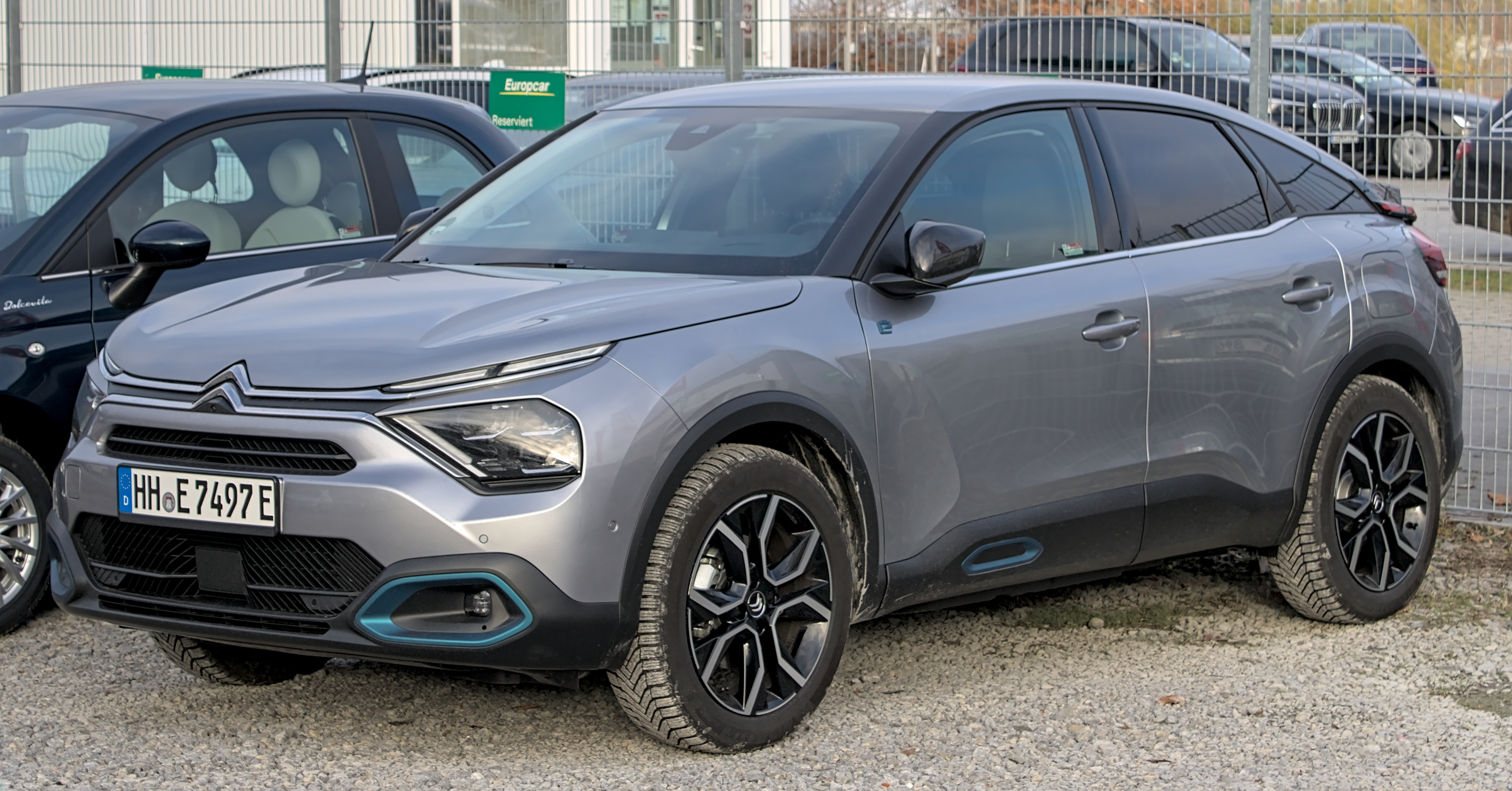
Citroën ë-C4

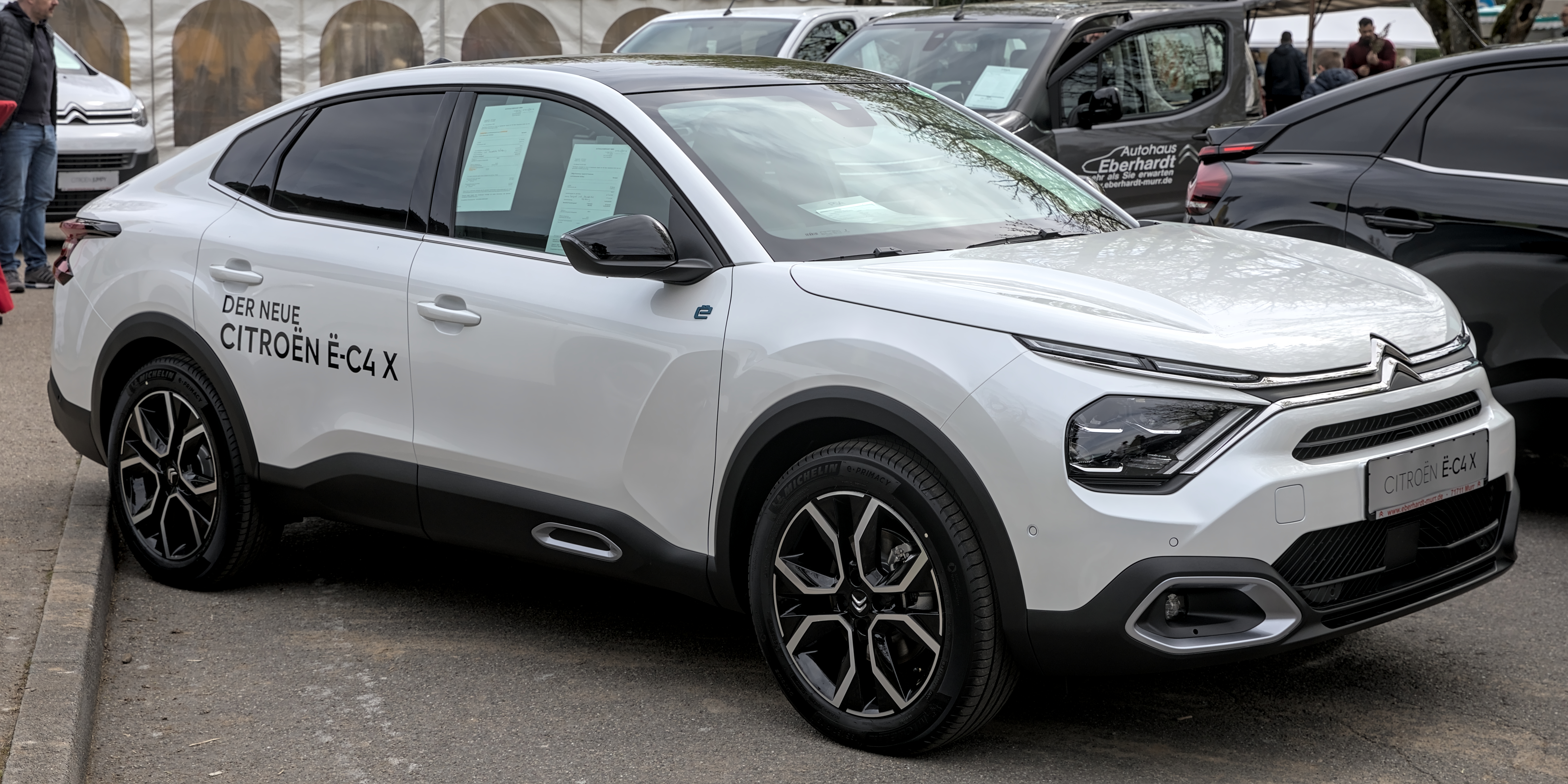
Citroën ë-C4 X

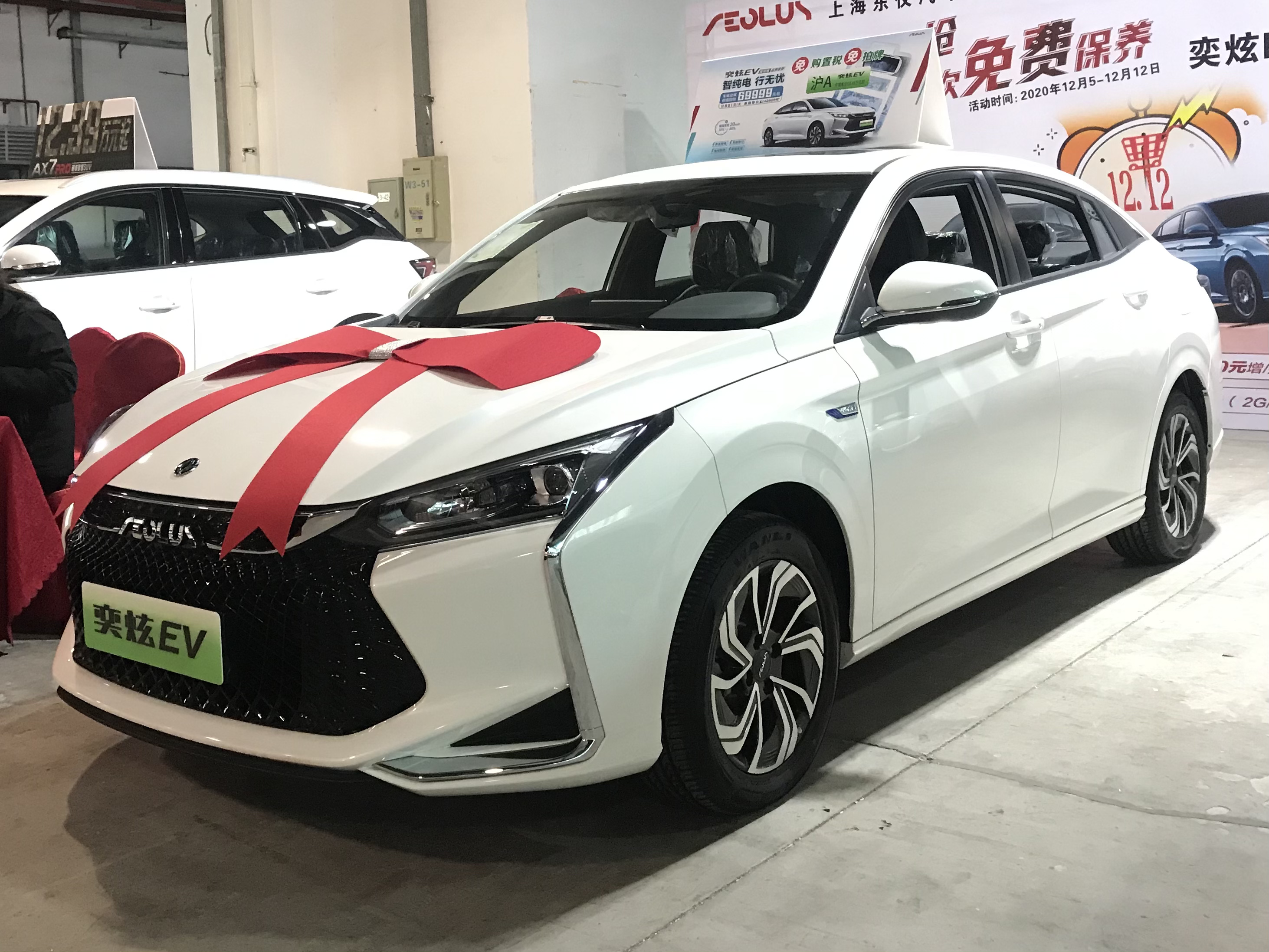
Dongfeng Aeolus Yixuan EV

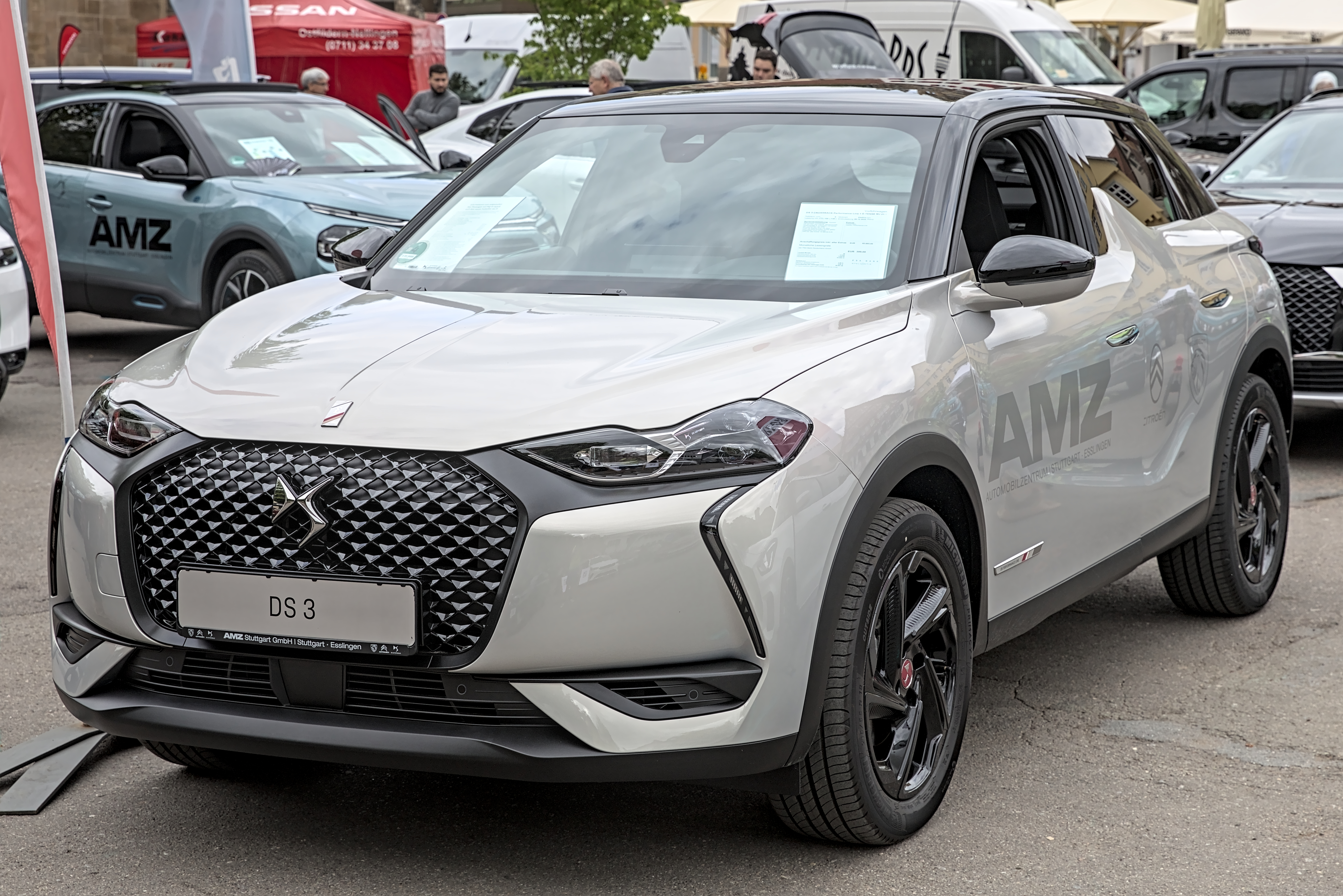
DS 3 Crossback E-Tense

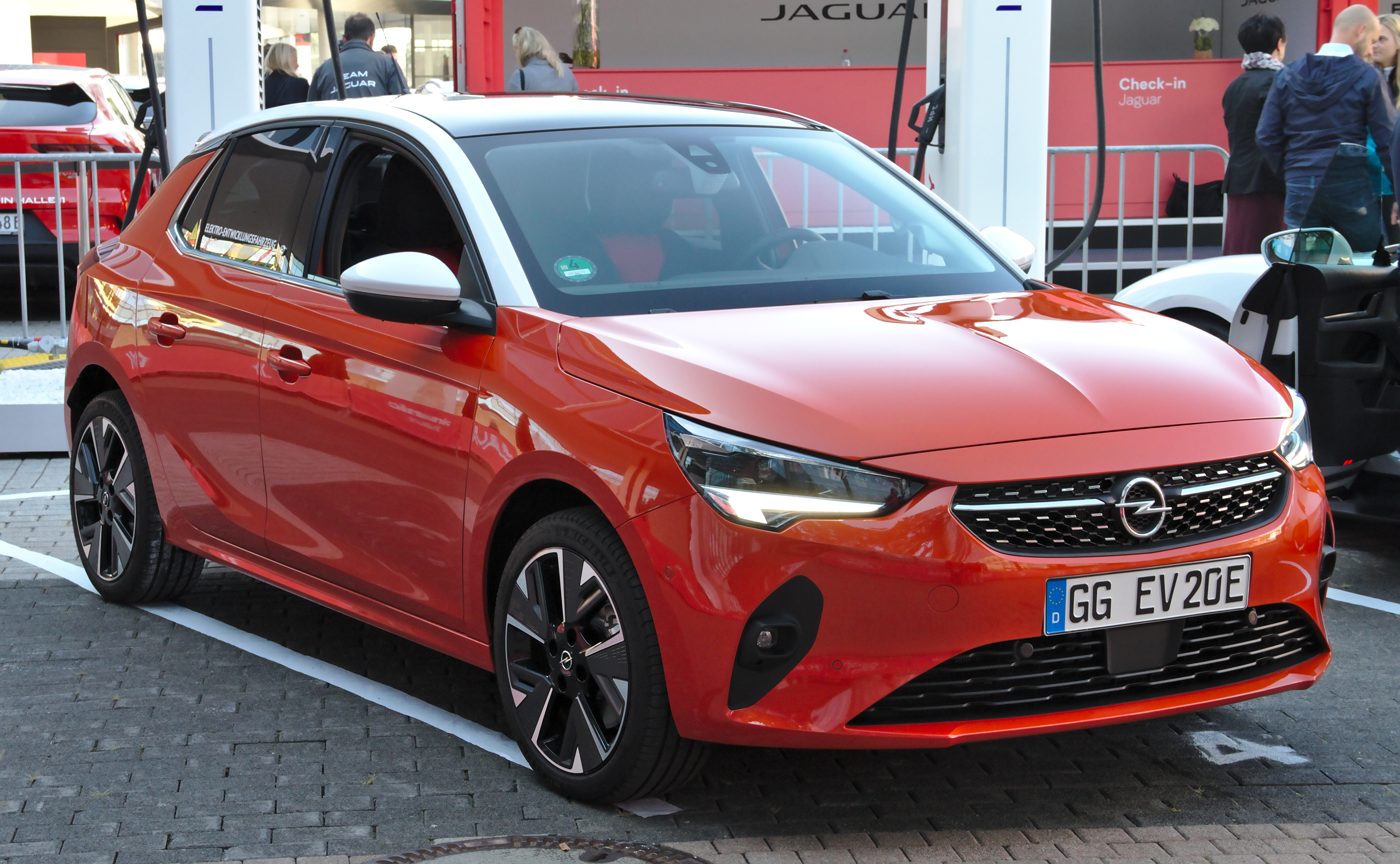
Opel Corsa-e

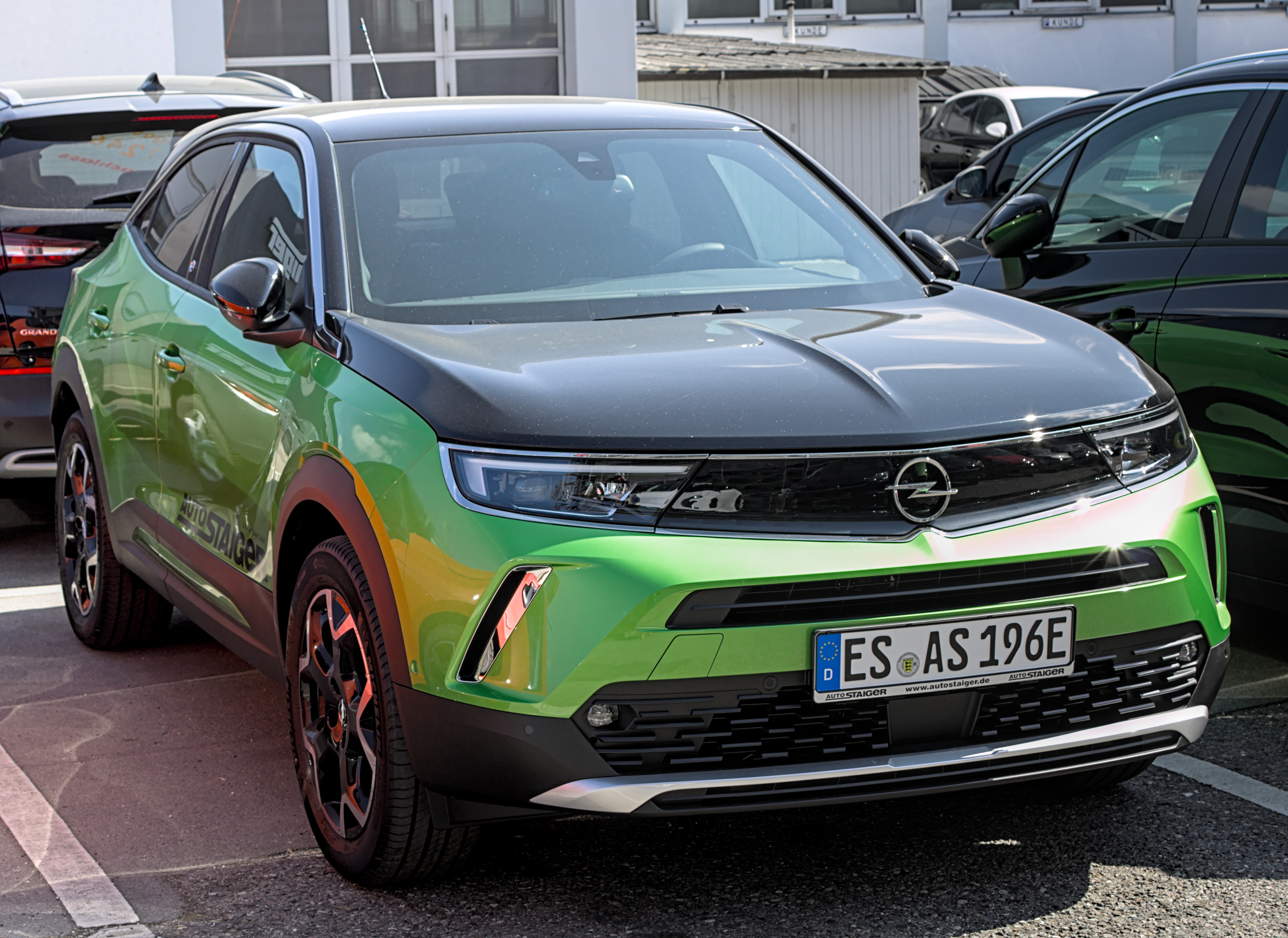
Opel Mokka-e

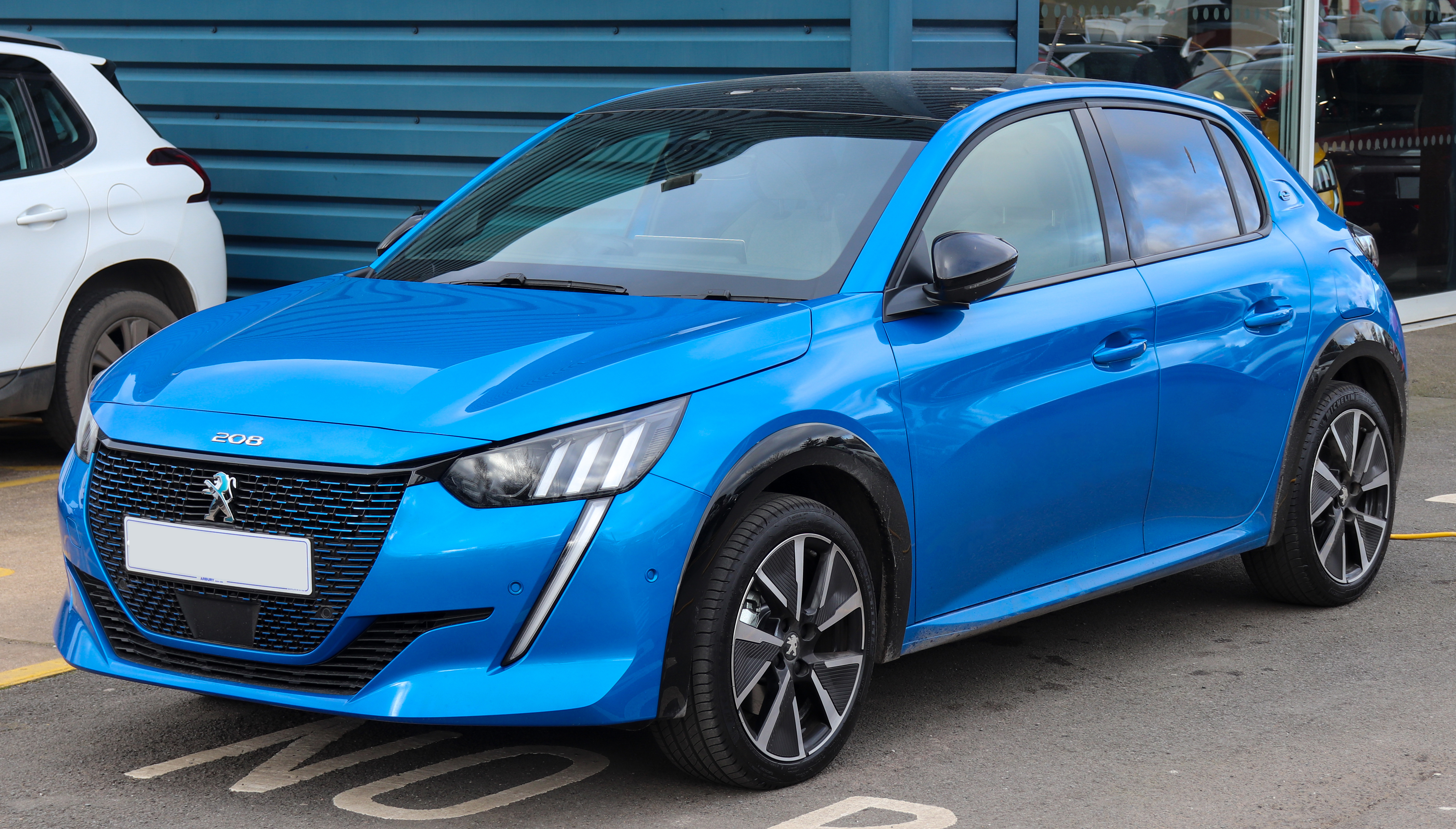
Peugeot e-208

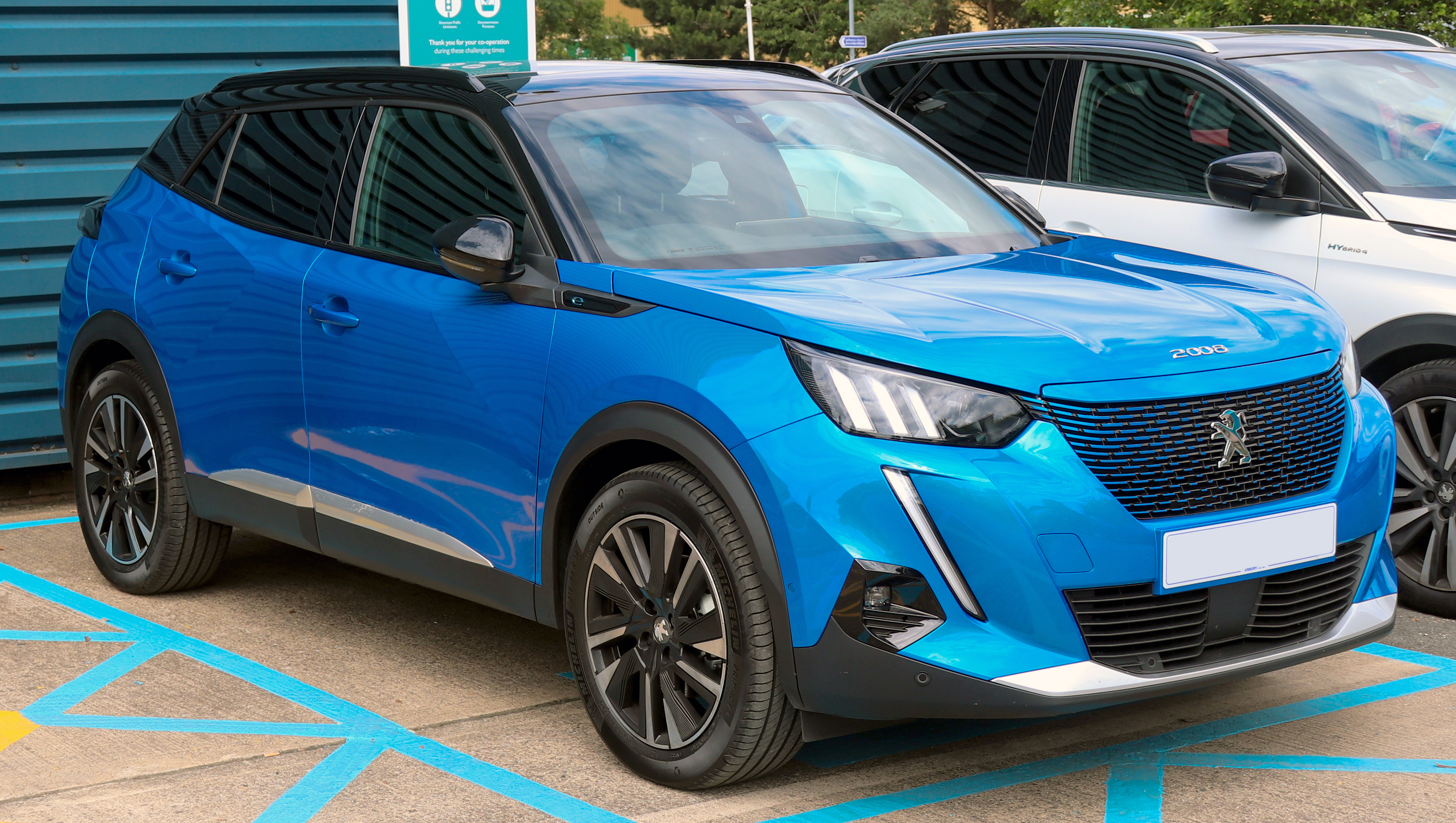
Peugeot e-2008

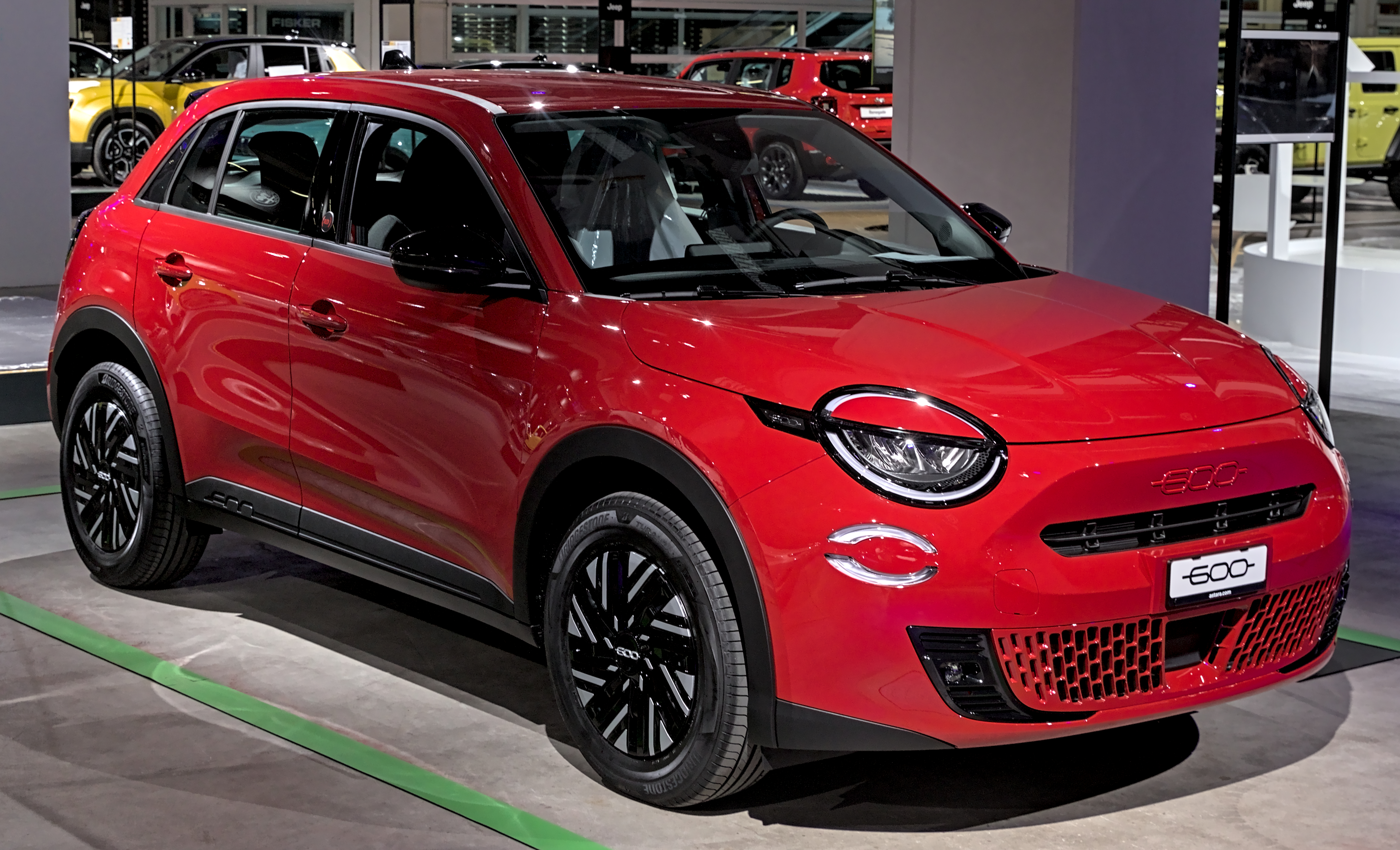
Fiat 600e

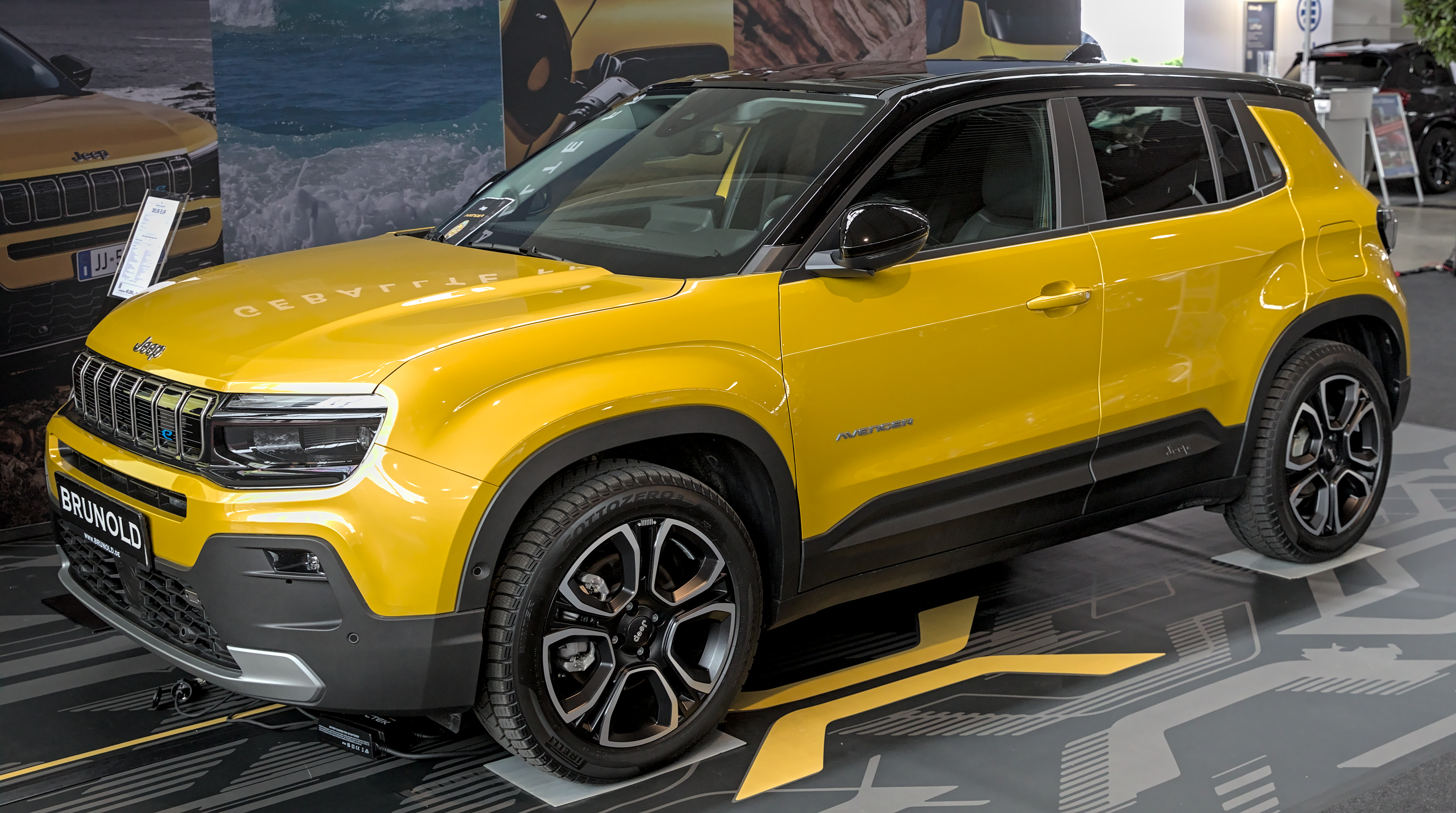
Jeep Avenger EV

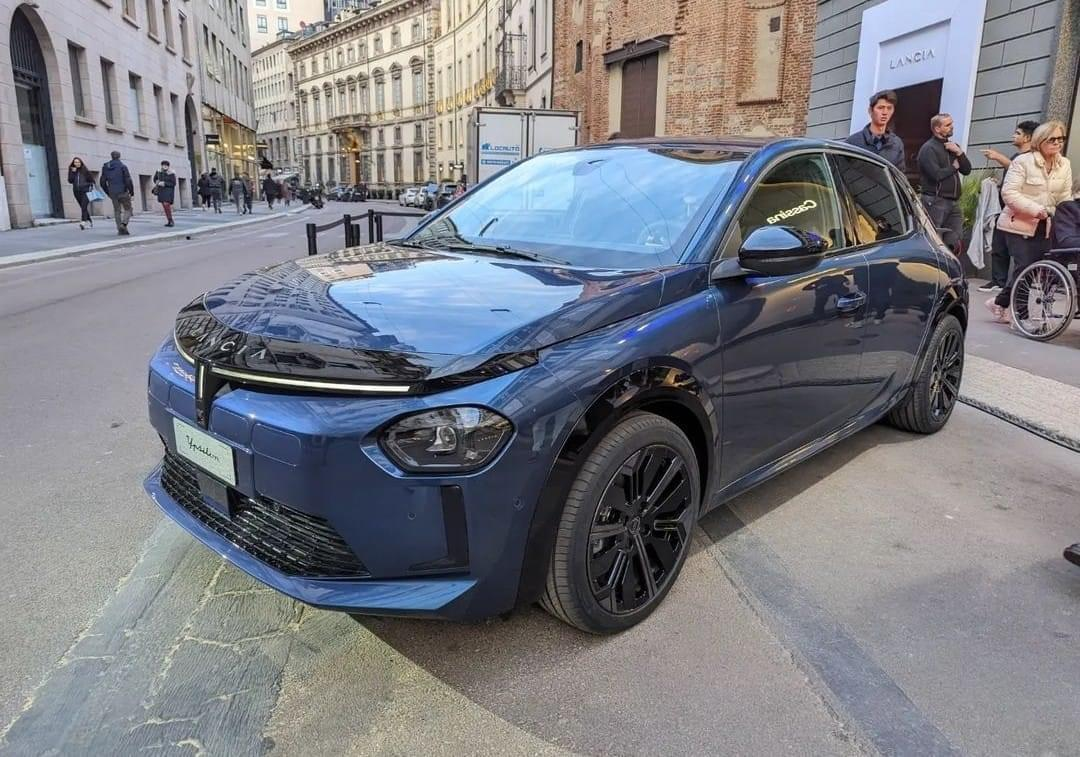
Lancia Ypsilon

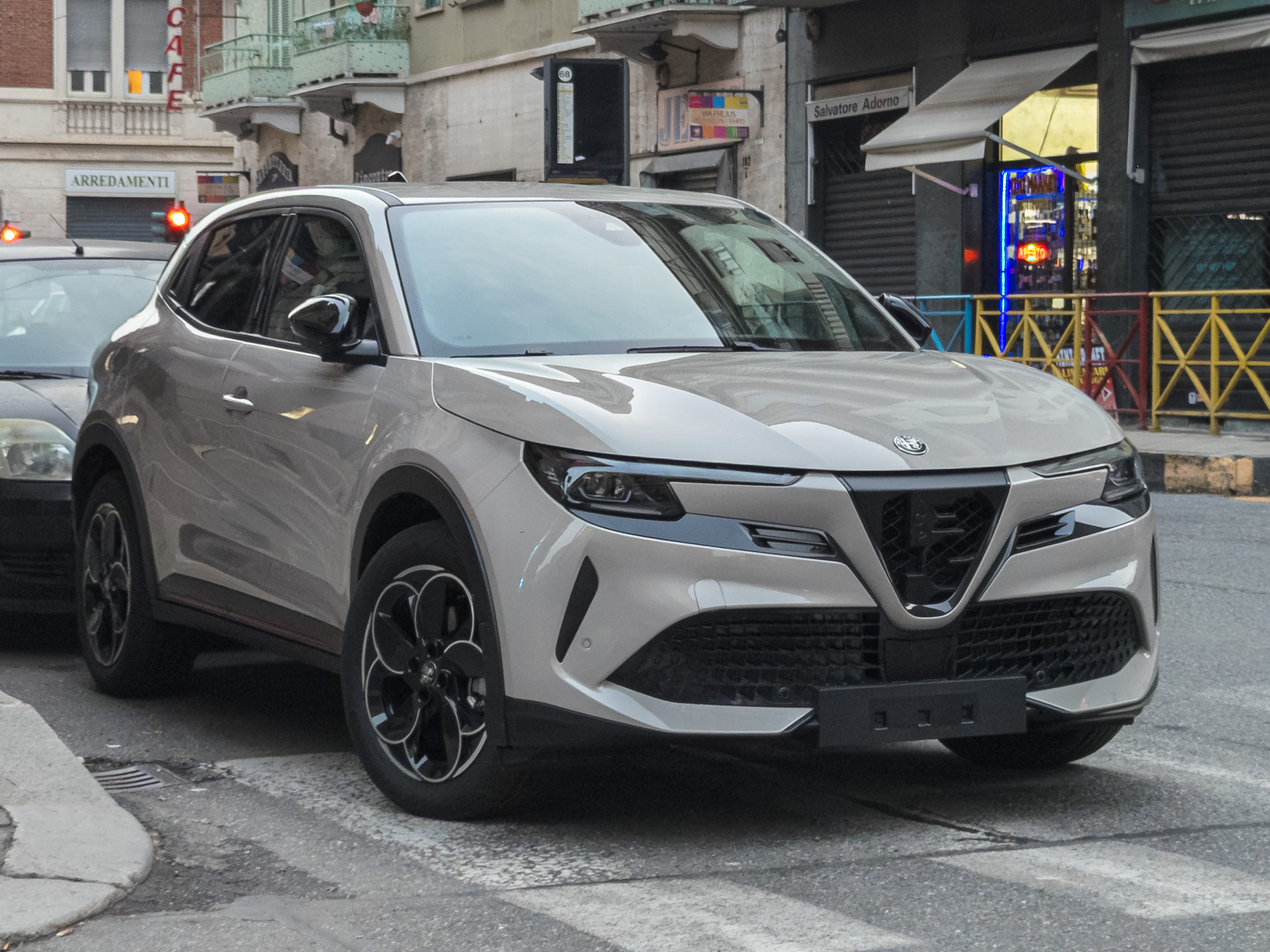
Alfa Romeo Junior

=== Smart Car Platform ===
The Smart Car Platform (SCP) is an electric iteration of the CMP platform, developed by Tata Consultancy Services for PSA. It is described as a more efficient alternative to other STLA modular architectures with focus on battery electric models, and will underpin 7 models produced by Stellantis in the future. The 7 models will include Fiat Grande Panda, Citroen C3 Aircross and Opel Frontera. The EV is equipped with 43 or 83 kW motor, 29 up to 44 kWh LiFePO_{4} battery which can travel up to 320 km.

- Citroën C3 (2022–present, Asia, South Africa, Latin America)
- Citroën C3 Aircross (2023–present, Asia, South Africa, Latin America)
- Citroën C3/e-C3 (2024–present, Europe)
- Citroën C3 Aircross (2024–present, Europe)
- Citroën Basalt (2024–present)
- Opel Frontera (2024–present)
- Fiat Grande Panda (2024–present)
- Fiat Grizzly / Chrysler Arrow Cross (2026; to commence)
- Fiat Grizzly Fastback / Chrysler Arrow (2026; to commence)
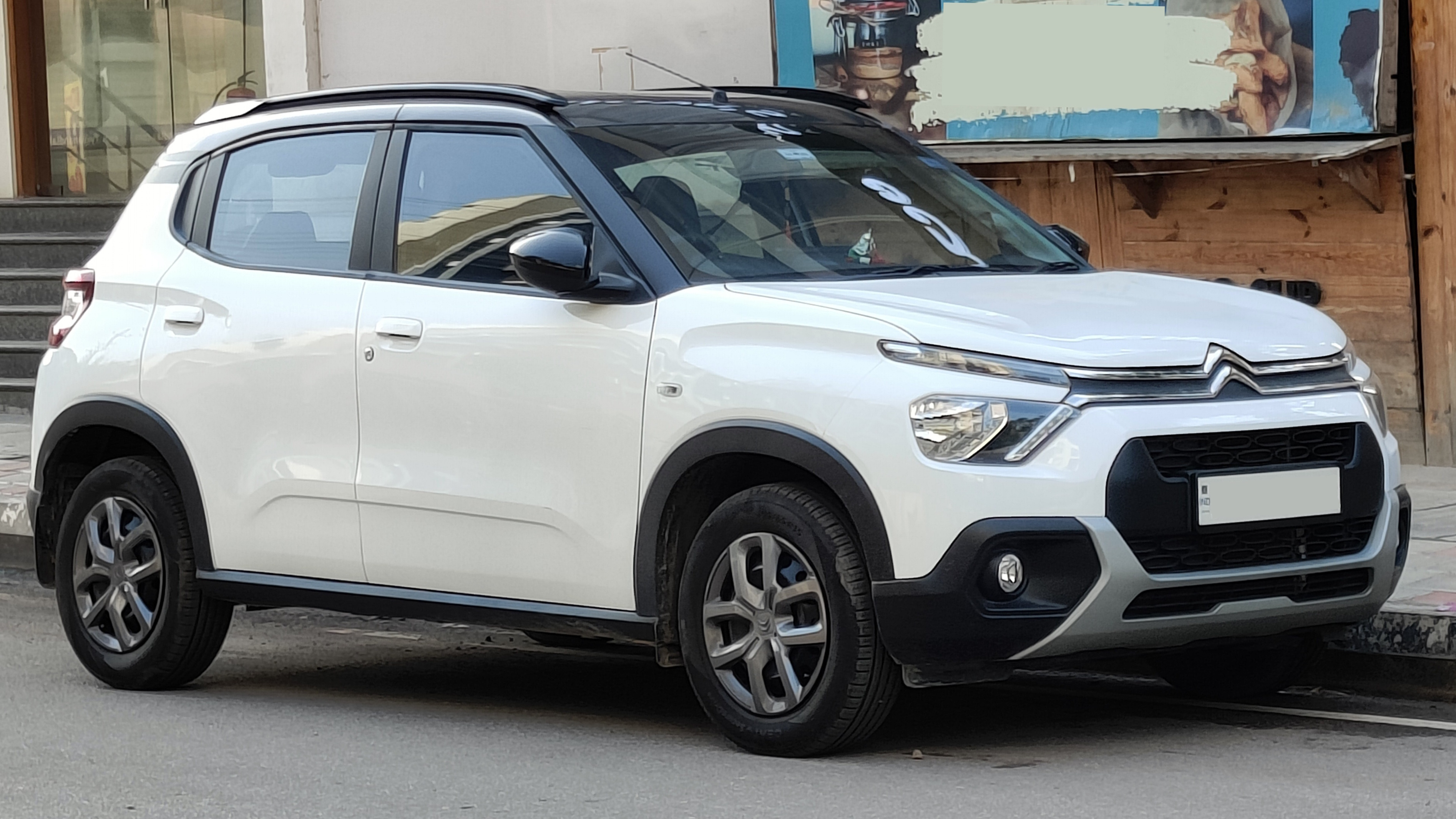
Citroën C3 (Latin America & Asia)

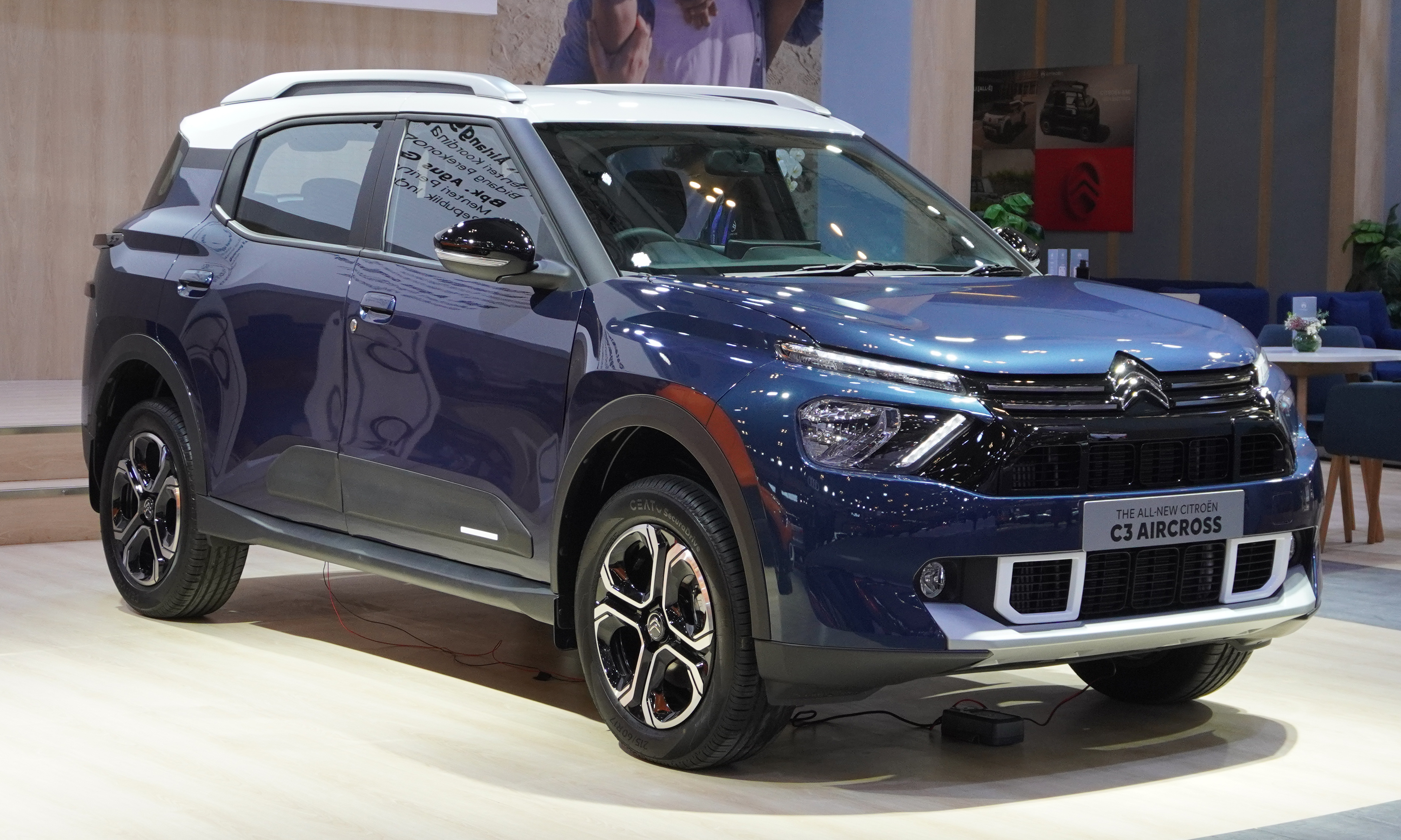
Citroën C3 Aircross (Latin America & Asia)

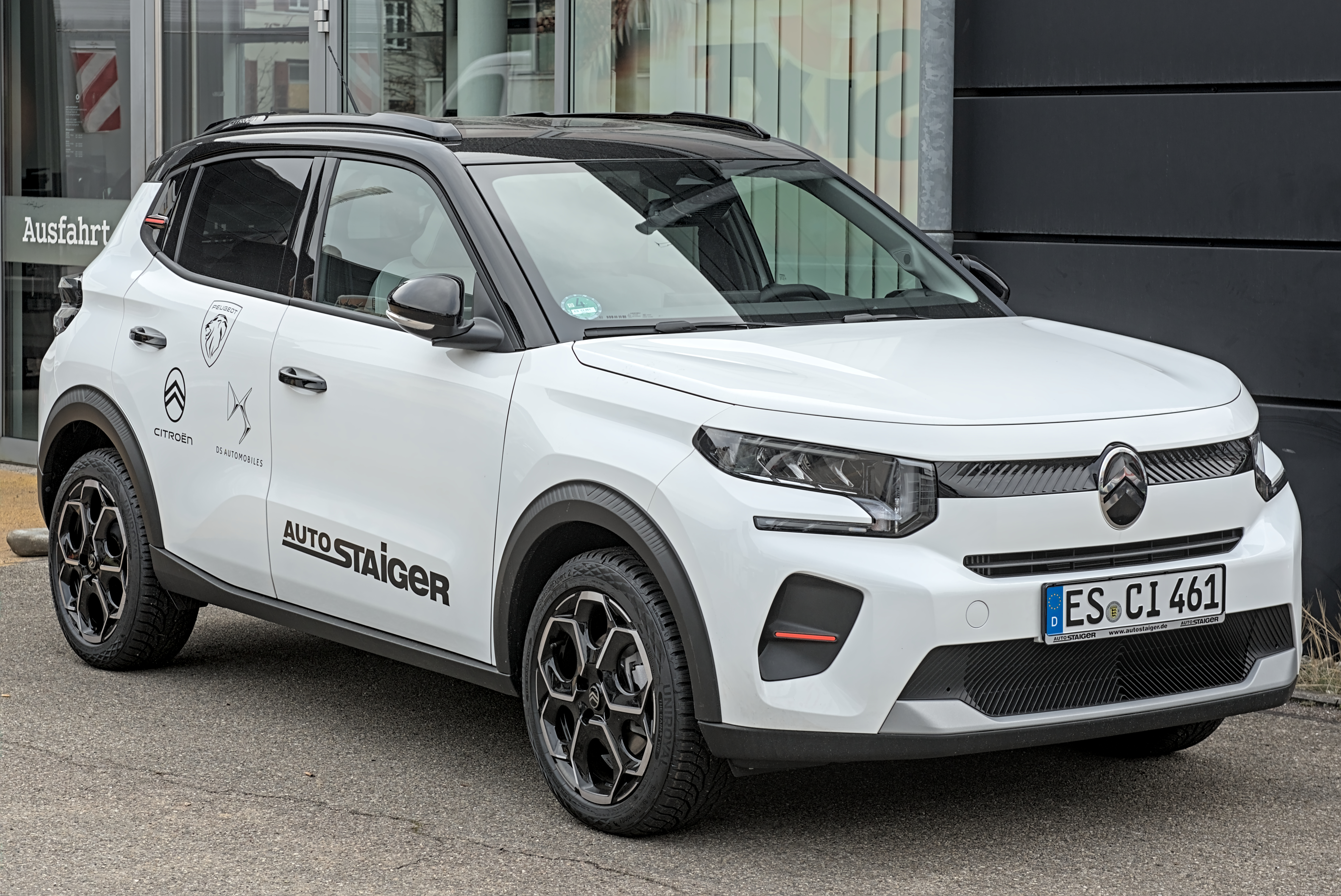
Citroën C3 (Europe)

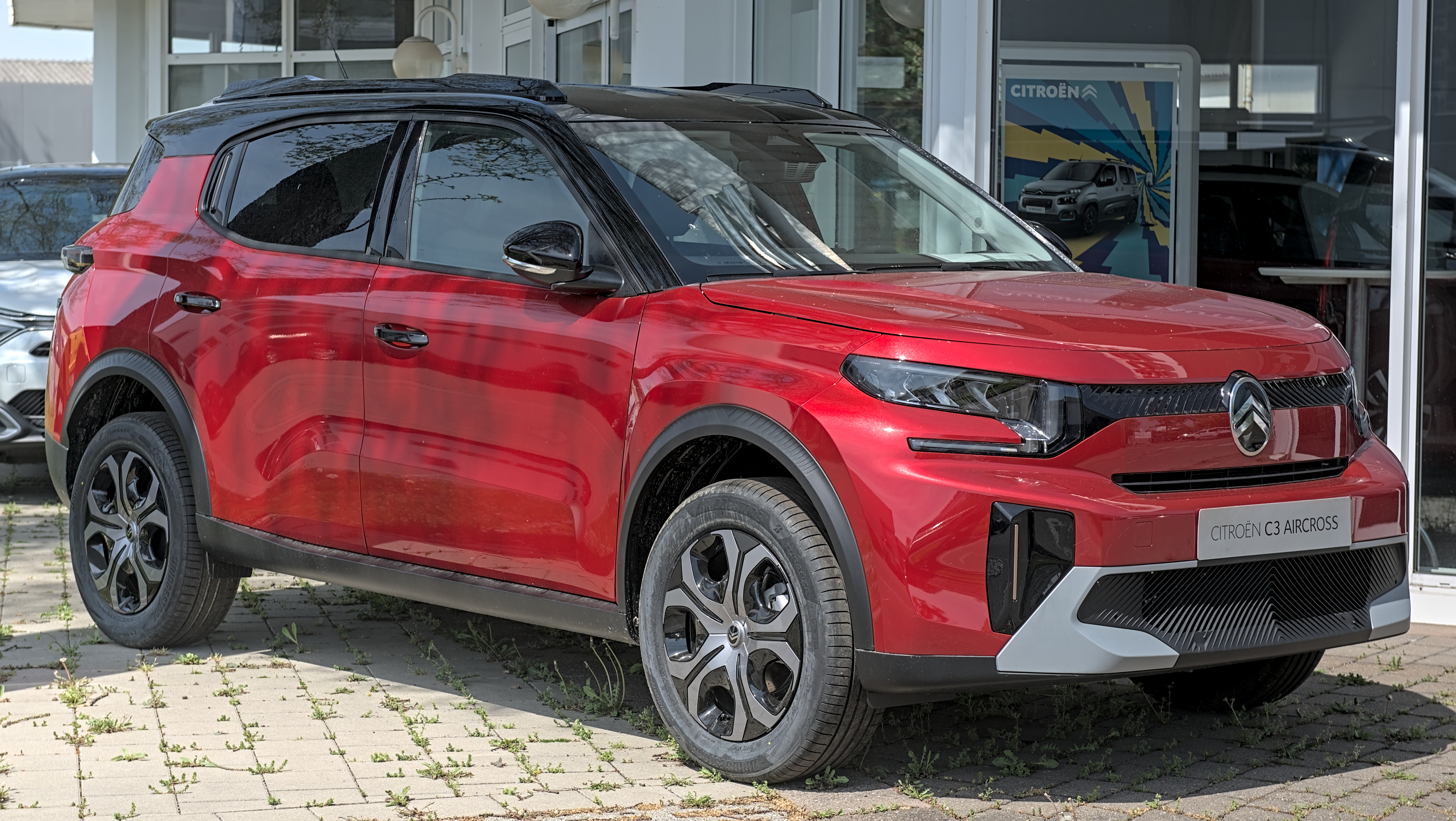
Citroën C3 Aircross (Europe)

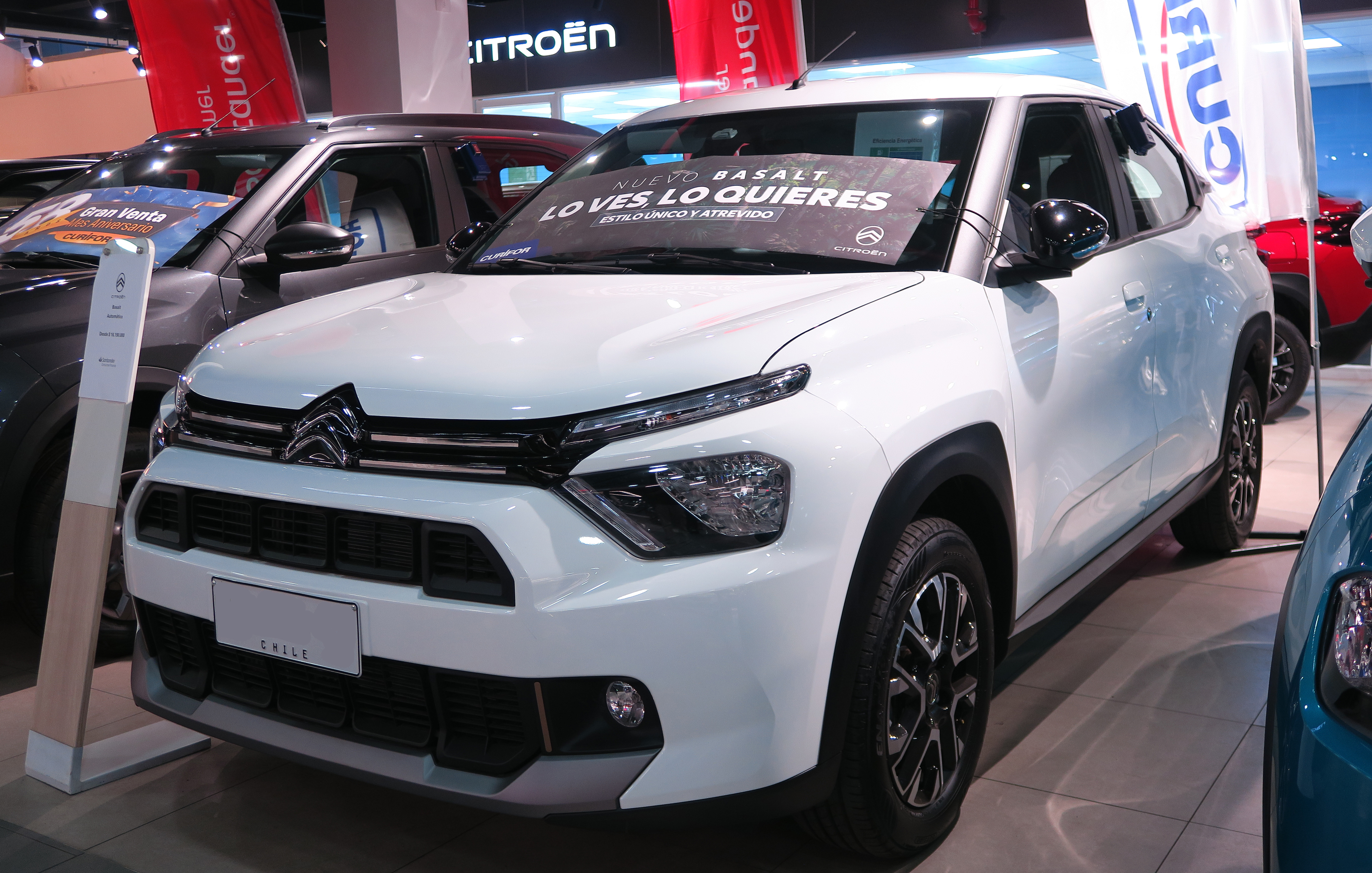
Citroën Basalt

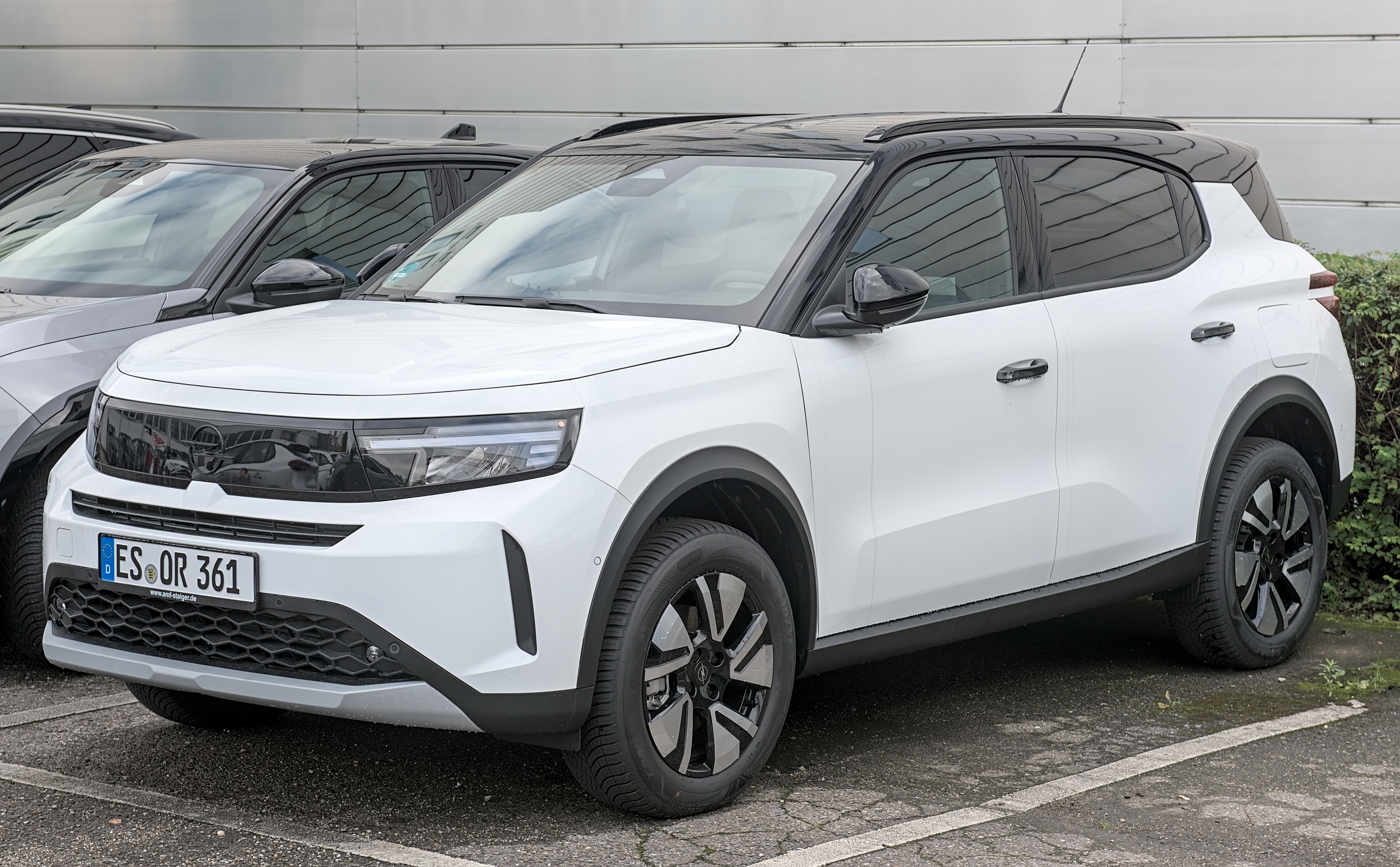
Opel Frontera

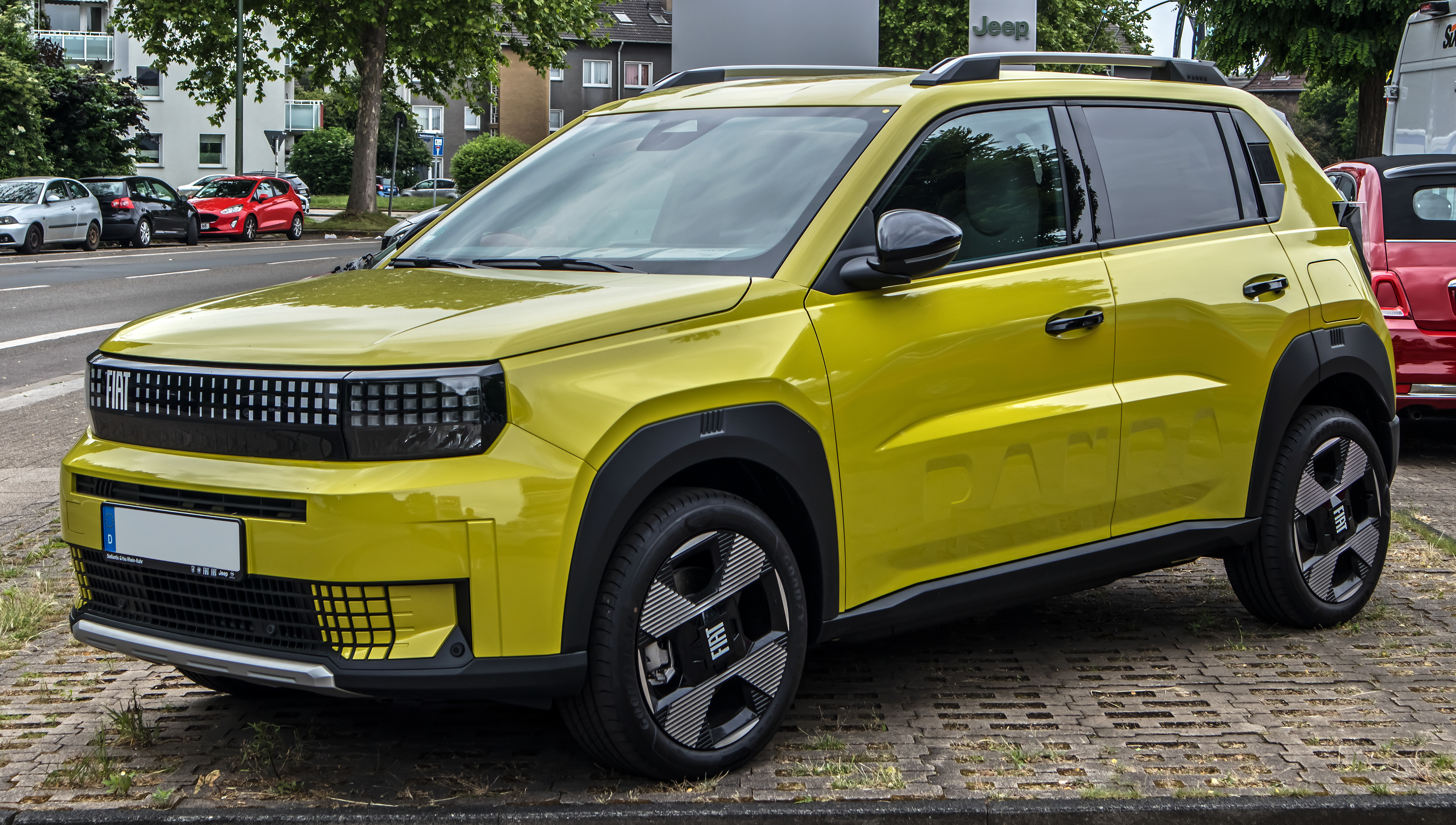
Fiat Grande Panda

Fiat Grizzly

Fiat Grizzly Fastback

=== STLA Small ===
STLA Small platform will debut in 2026.

- Peugeot e-208
- Fiat 500 (coming 2027)

== See also ==
- List of PSA platforms
- List of Stellantis platforms
