= Fiat Grizzly =

Compact crossover SUV

- Grizzly SUV

Overview
- Manufacturer: Stellantis
- Production: 2026 (to commence)
- Assembly: Morocco: Kénitra (Stellantis Kenitra plant)

Body and chassis
- Class: Compact crossover SUV (C)
- Body style: 5-door SUV (Grizzly); 5-door coupe SUV (Grizzly Fastback)
- Layout: Front-engine, front-wheel-drive; Front-motor, front-wheel-drive (EV)
- Platform: Stellantis Smart Car platform
- Related: Fiat Grande Panda; Citroën C3/ë-C3 (CC21); Citroën C3 Aircross; Opel Frontera

Powertrain
- Engine: 1.2 L I3 (petrol and mild hybrid)
- Electric motor: Permanent magnet synchronous (EV)
- Hybrid drivetrain: Mild hybrid
- Battery: LFP (EV)

The Fiat Grizzly is a compact crossover SUV (C-segment) manufactured by the Italian automaker Fiat. It was revealed on 3 June 2026 in two body styles, the Grizzly and the more steeply roofed Grizzly Fastback. It is built on the Smart Car platform shared with the Fiat Grande Panda, the fourth-generation Citroën C3, the Citroën C3 Aircross, and the Opel Frontera, and sits above the Grande Panda as a larger and more practical family vehicle.

The Grizzly is offered with a range of powertrains spanning petrol, mild hybrid, and fully electric configurations. It is positioned as a global model, with sales beginning in Europe and the Middle East and Africa in the second half of 2026, followed by expansion into Latin America. In North America, Stellantis will market a redesigned variant under the Chrysler brand.

== Overview ==
Fiat unveiled the first official images of the Grizzly and Grizzly Fastback on 3 June 2026, describing them as global models intended to complete the brand's affordable family vehicle line-up alongside the smaller Grande Panda. Fiat chief executive Olivier François stated that the two vehicles were "designed around different needs, different lifestyles, but sharing the same idea". The Grizzly is intended to compete in the affordable family SUV segment against models such as the Dacia Bigster.

Both body styles measure under 4.5 m (14.8 ft) in length, placing them above the Grande Panda and the brand's other Smart Car platform siblings. Depending on the market, the Grizzly serves as an indirect replacement for several discontinued or regional Fiat models, including the Tipo, the Pulse, and the earlier Fastback.

It was unveiled at the Paris Motor Show on 12 October 2026.

Rear view (SUV)

Grizzly Fastback

Rear view (Fastback)

Interior

== Design ==
The Grizzly and Grizzly Fastback share the majority of their body panels below the roofline but are differentiated by their rooflines and rear treatments. The standard Grizzly adopts an upright, boxy SUV profile with sculpted side surfaces, squared-off wheel arches, standard roof rails, and an illuminated front grille, with sharp LED headlights extending down into the lower bumper. Its more vertical proportions are intended to maximise interior volume and headroom.

The Grizzly Fastback adopts a sleeker silhouette with a roofline that slopes toward the rear, full-width LED taillights, a ducktail spoiler integrated into the tailgate, and the deletion of roof rails. Rugged plastic cladding around the lower body retains a utilitarian appearance, while the fastback layout provides greater longitudinal cargo capacity. Both models feature a distinctive LED light signature that bears a resemblance to that of the Grande Panda.

As of the reveal, Fiat had not released official images of the interior, but stated that both models would offer refined materials, what it described as a best-in-class boot capacity, and new in-car technologies within a footprint under 4.5 m (14.8 ft).

== Powertrains ==
The Grizzly is offered with a 1.2-litre three-cylinder petrol engine, available in conventional and mild hybrid forms, as well as a fully electric variant that uses an electric motor and battery shared with other Stellantis Smart Car platform vehicles.
