= Alfa Romeo Junior =

Alfa Romeo Junior may refer to:

- Alfa Romeo GT Junior, a trim level of the Alfa Romeo 105/115 Series Coupés
- Alfa Romeo Junior (2024), a crossover SUV
