= List of PSA engines =

The PSA Group (Peugeot/Citroën) (Now Stellantis) sells a variety of automobile engines. Later HDi engines are built as part of a joint-venture with Ford Motor Company.

== DJ/DK ==
The DJ/DK is a family of inline-four diesel engines derived from the 2.1-liter XUD engine. The DJ engines were for installation in commercial vehicles, while the DKs were for passenger cars.

- DK5 — 2.5 L (2,446 cc) turbo

== Douvrin ==
The Douvrin family, formally called ZDJ/ZEJ by Peugeot, was a family of all-aluminum inline-four petrol (and diesel engine, not used by Peugeot) made in a joint-venture between PSA and Renault from 1977 until 1996.

- 2.0 (ZEJ) — 2.0 L (1995 cc)
- 2.2 (ZDJ) — 2.2 L (2165 cc)

NOTE : The six-cylinder PRV engine (Peugeot, Renault, Volvo) was built in the same factory in Douvrin, in northern France between Lens and Béthune. The "X" engine—found in the Peugeot 104 and 205, Citroën Visa and LNA, Talbot Samba, and Renault 14—represented the entry-level offering among the "Douvrin" engines.

== DT ==
The DT is a family of diesel V6 engines shared between the PSA Group, Jaguar Land Rover and Ford Motor Company (where it is called AJD-V6).

- DT17 — 2.7 L (2,720 cc)
- DT20 — 3.0 L (2,993 cc)

== DV ==
The DV is a family of diesel inline-four engines shared between the PSA Group, Mazda Motor Corporation (where it is called MZ-CD or CiTD) and Ford Motor Company (where it is called DLD).

- DV4 — 1.4 L (1,399 cc)
- DV5 — 1.5 L (1,499 cc)
- DV6 — 1.6 L (1,560 cc)

== EB ==
PSA PureTech engine
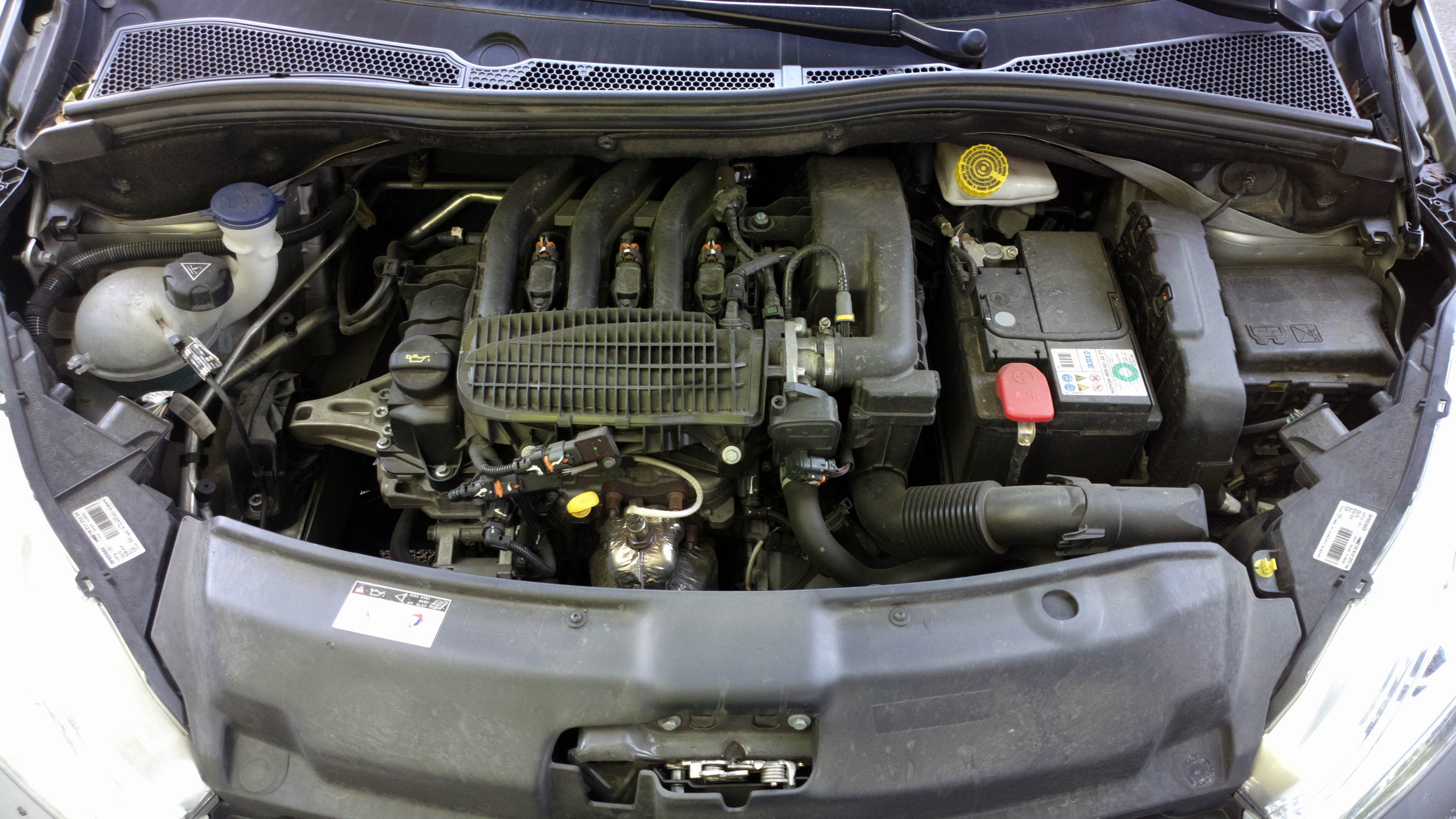

Overview
- Manufacturer: PSA Peugeot Citroën
- Production: 2012-present

Layout
- Configuration: Straight-3
- Displacement: 1.0 L (999 cc); 1.2 L (1,199 cc)
- Cylinder bore: 71 mm (2.80 in); 75 mm (2.95 in)
- Piston stroke: 84.1 mm (3.31 in); 90.5 mm (3.56 in)
- Valvetrain: DOHC 4 valves x cyl. with VVT
- Valvetrain drive system: wet belt (until 2026 in some versions) chain (from 2023)

Combustion
- Turbocharger: intercooler (some versions)
- Fuel system: direct injection Multi point injection
- Fuel type: Petrol and petrol/hybrid engine.
- Cooling system: Water-cooled

Output
- Power output: 68–155 PS (50–114 kW; 67–153 hp)
- Torque output: 95–250 N⋅m (70–184 lb⋅ft)

Emissions
- Emissions target standard: Euro 5 - Euro 6

Chronology
- Predecessor: PSA TU engine

The EB is a family of inline-three petrol engines. EB is also known commercially as PureTech engine:

- EB0 — 1.0 L (999 cc) naturally aspirated Euro 5 50 kW (68 hp) (Used in early Peugeot 208 I)
- EB2FA — 1.2 L (1,199 cc) naturally aspirated Euro 6 55 kW (75 hp) @ 5750 rpm, 118 Nm @ 2750 rpm (Used in Peugeot 208 II, Opel Corsa F)
- EB2F — 1.2 L (1,199 cc) naturally aspirated Euro 6 61 kW (82 hp 2017-2020) (83 hp 2020-present) (Used in Citroen C1 II (2014-2018), Citroen C4 Cactus, Citroën C3 III, Opel Crossland X)
- EB2ADTD — 1.2 L (1,199 cc) turbo Euro 6 74 kW (100 hp) @ 5500 rpm, 205 Nm @ 1750 rpm (Used in Peugeot 208 II, Opel Corsa F, Opel Mokka B, Jeep Avenger, Citroën C4 III, Lancia Ypsilon (L21))
- EB2DT / EB2ADT — 1.2 L (1,199 cc) turbo Euro 6 81 kW (110 hp) @ 5500 rpm, 205 Nm @ 1750 rpm (Used in Citroën C3 III, Opel Combo, Citroen C4 Cactus, Opel Crossland X)
- EB2DTS — 1.2 L (1,199 cc) turbo Euro 6 96 kW (130 hp) @ 5500 rpm, 230 Nm @ 1750 rpm (Used in Opel Grandland X, Opel Mokka B, Peugeot 308 II, Citroën C4 III)
- EB2ADTS — 1.2 L (1,199 cc) turbo Euro 6 100 kW (136 hp) @ 5500 rpm, 231 Nm @ 1750 rpm (Used in Fiat 600 (2023), Alfa Romeo Junior (2024) Peugeot 208 II, Opel Corsa F, Opel Mokka B, Opel Combo, Peugeot 308 III, MPM Erelis, Jeep Compass)
- EB2ADTX — 1.2 L (1,199 cc) turbo Euro 6 115 kW (155 hp) @ 5500 rpm, 240 Nm @ 1750 rpm (Used in Peugeot 2008 GT, Citroën C4 III)
- EB2LTED — 1.2 (1,199cc) Turbo Euro 6 74kW (100 Hp) @ 5500 RPM, 205 Nm @ 1500 RPM (Used in Peugeot 208 II, Opel Corsa F Opel Mokka B, Jeep Avenger, Citroën C4 III, Lancia Ypsilon (L21)) (please note this engine is chain-driven launch to in 2023 and it's the successor to EB2ADTD which was on wet belts and was problematic)
- EB2LTEDH2 — 1.2 (1,199 cc) Turbo Euro 6/7 power output actually varies depending on options and model because this engine uses a Mild hybrid system but depending on power output but for Peak power @ 5500 RPM and newton metres of torque actually varies @ 1750 RPM depending on hybrid system (used in various Stellantis vehicles that feature 48 volt Hybrid E-DCS6 System)

Applications:

- Citroën Berlingo III/Peugeot Rifter/Toyota ProAce City
- Citroën C1 II (2014-2018)
- Citroën C3 (2016 onwards)
- Citroën C3/C4 Aircross
- Citroën C3-XR
- Citroën C4 Cactus
- Citroën C4 Picasso
- Citroën C5 Aircross
- DS 3 (known between 2018 and 2022 as the DS 3 Crossback)
- DS No. 4 (2021 onwards, known until 2025 as the DS 4)
- DS 4 (2010-2018)
- DS 4S
- DS 7 (known until 2022 as the DS 7 Crossback)
- Jeep Avenger
- Jeep Compass (2025-present)
- Lancia Ypsilon (Type L21)
- MPM Erelis
- Opel Astra L
- Opel/Vauxhall Combo E
- Opel/Vauxhall Corsa F
- Opel/Vauxhall Crossland (known until 2020 as the Opel/Vauxhall Crossland X)
- Opel/Vauxhall Frontera (2024 onwards)
- Opel/Vauxhall Grandland (known until 2021 as the Opel/Vauxhall Grandland X)
- Opel/Vauxhall Mokka
- Peugeot 108
- Peugeot 208
- Peugeot 2008
- Peugeot 301
- Peugeot 308 (2013 onwards)
- Peugeot 408 (2014 onwards)
- Peugeot 3008 (2015 onwards)
- Peugeot 5008 (2014 onwards)

The 2019 facelift of the Opel/Vauxhall Astra K included a new 1.2 3-cylinder turbo with 110, 130 or 145 hp but this is not the PSA PureTech engine. This engine is part of GM’s E-Turbo range and had already been extensively developed at by GM for the 2019 Astra before PSA purchased the company. An all-new Astra, based on a PSA platform and using PSA engines was released in 2021.

The Puretech Engine is notorius for being prone to failure, due to using an oil-bathed timing belt, causing the timing belt to degrade and crack, which releases small particles which clogs the oil pump, resulting in catastrophic engine damage. However, this has been remedied as newer models have a timing chain as opposed to a rubber belt found in older models.

The "Puretech" name has been discontinued following the Gen3 model due to the brand's poor reputation.

== EC ==
PSA EC engine

Overview
- Manufacturer: PSA Peugeot Citroën
- Production: 2012-present

Layout
- Configuration: Straight-4
- Displacement: 1.6 L (1,587 cc); 1.8 L (1,814 cc)
- Cylinder bore: 78.5 mm (3.09 in); 79 mm (3.11 in)
- Piston stroke: 82 mm (3.23 in); 92.5 mm (3.64 in)
- Valvetrain: DOHC 4 valves x cyl. with VVT
- Compression ratio: 11.0:1

Combustion
- Fuel system: direct injection Multi point injection
- Fuel type: Petrol
- Cooling system: Water-cooled

Output
- Power output: 115–140 PS (85–103 kW; 113–138 hp)
- Torque output: 150–172 N⋅m (111–127 lb⋅ft)

Emissions
- Emissions target standard: Euro 5 - Euro 6

Chronology
- Predecessor: PSA TU engine

The EC family of small inline-four piston engines are largely based on its predecessor, the TU family, for China, North Africa and Latin America. They are appeared in 2012 and used in cars such as Peugeot 301 and Citroën C-Elysée.

- EC5 — 1.6 L 115 PS (85 kW; 113 hp).
- EC8 — 1.8 L 136 PS (100 kW; 134 hp).

== ES ==
The ES family is a 60° DOHC 24 valve V6 petrol engine. It replaced the PRV engine in 1997.

- ES9 — 2.9 L (2,946 cc)

== EW/DW ==
The EW/DW is a family of inline-four petrol and diesel engines:

- EW7 — 1.8 L (1,749 cc)
- EW10 — 2.0 L (1,997 cc)
- EW12 — 2.2 L (2,231 cc)
- DW8 — 1.9 L (1,868 cc)
- DW10 — 2.0 L (1,997 cc) turbo
- DW12 — 2.2 L (2,179 cc) turbo

== Prince ==
The Prince engine is a family of inline-four 16-valve all-aluminium petrol engines with variable valve lift and variable valve timing developed by PSA (Peugeot Citroën) together with BMW. It replaced a part of the TU line (the other part was later replaced by the EB engine) as well as the EW line.

Engines:

- EP3 — 1.4 L (1,397 cc) Euro 4 70-72 kW
- EP3C — 1.4 L (1,397 cc) Euro 5 70-72 kW
- EP6 — 1.6 L (1,598 cc) Euro 4 72-88 kW
- EP6C — 1.6 L (1,598 cc) Euro 5 72-88 kW
- EP6DT — 1.6 L (1,598 cc) Euro 4 103-120 kW
- EP6CDT — 1.6 L (1,598 cc) Euro 5 103-120 kW
- EP6DTS — 1.6 L (1,598 cc) Euro 4 128-152 kW
- EP6CDTS — 1.6 L (1,598 cc) Euro 5 135 kW
- EP6CDTX — 1.6 L (1,598 cc) Euro 5 147-150 kW
- EP6FDTR — 1.6 L (1,598 cc) Euro 6 200 kW
- EP6FADTX — 1.6 L (1,598 cc) Euro 6.2 164 kW
- EP6FADTR — 1.6 L (1,598 cc) Euro 6.2 199 kW

== PRV ==
The PRV was a shared 90° SOHC V6 engine, with later SOHC 24-valve and turbocharged additions. The PRV was shared between Peugeot, Renault, and Volvo Cars, thus the "PRV" name. It was produced from 1974 until it was phased out in favor of the PSA ES engine in 1998. PSA codenamed it the Z series internally.

- ZM — 2.7 L (2,664 cc)
- ZN — 2.9 L (2,849 cc)
- ZP — 3.0 L (2,975 cc)

== TM/TN ==
The TM and TN was a family of inline-four petrol engines used in the Peugeot 203 and 403:

Model	Displacement	Compression	Output
TM	1.3 L (1,290 cc)	6.8:1-7.1:1	42-45 PS
TM5	1.3 L (1,290 cc)	7.3:1	54 PS
TN3	1.5 L (1,468 cc)	7.3:1	58 PS

== TMD ==
The TMD was a family of inline-four Diesel engines produced by Indenor used in the Peugeot 403 and J9:

Model	Displacement	Compression	Output
TMD80	1.6 L (1,608 cc)	21:1	38 PS
TMD85	1.8 L (1,816 cc)	21:1	48 PS

== TU ==
The TU is a family of inline-four petrol engines of varying displacements:

- TU9 — 1.0 L (954 cc)
- TU1 — 1.1 L (1,124 cc)
- TU2 — 1.3 L (1,294 cc)
- TU3 — 1.4 L (1,361 cc)
- TU5 — 1.6 L (1,587 cc)

== TUD ==
The TUD is a family of inline-four Diesel engines:

- TUD3 — 1.4 L (1,360 cc)
- TUD5 — 1.5 L (1,527 cc)

== X ==
The X family was a line of SOHC inline-four petrol engines used by PSA and Renault for supermini cars, notable for its integral, side-mounted transmission design (which lent it its common nickname the "suitcase engine"), and that it was designed for near horizontal installation. It was produced from 1972 through 1988, when it was replaced by the PSA TU engine.

- XV — 1.0 L (954 cc)
- XW — 1.1 L (1,124 cc)
- XZ — 1.2 L (1,219 cc)
- XY — 1.4 L (1,361 cc)

== XB ==
The XB is a family of inline-four petrol engines:

- XB2 — 1.5 L (1,468 cc)
- XB5 — 1.5 L (1,468 cc)

== XC ==
The XC was a family of inline-four petrol engines primarily used in the Peugeot 404:

Model	Displacement	Compression	Output	notes
XC5	1.6 L (1,618 cc)		72-76 PS	
XC6	1.6 L (1,618 cc)		72 PS	
XC7	1.6 L (1,618 cc)		70 PS	
XCKF1	1.6 L (1,618 cc)		85 PS	Kugelfischer mechanical fuel injection
XCKF2	1.6 L (1,618 cc)		96 PS	Kugelfischer mechanical fuel injection

== XD ==
The XD was a family of inline diesel engines originally designed by independent engine manufacturer Indenor but since owned by PSA Peugeot Citroën. Most were four-cylinders, but six-cylinder versions were also offered, mainly for boats but also for heavier vehicles. Volvo Penta made a series of engines based on the six-cylinder XDP (MD27-32). The two-digit codes refer to the bore of the engine:

- XD75
- XD80 — 1.6 L (1,608 cc)
- XD85 — 1.8 L (1,816 cc)
- XDP-6.85 — 2.7 L (2,724 cc), inline-six
- XD88 — 1.9 L (1,948 cc)
- XDP-6.88 — 2.9 L (2,922 cc), inline-six - also known as X6M88
- XD90 — 2.1 L (2,112 cc) - also known as XDP-4.90
- XDP-6.90 — 3.2 L (3,168 cc), inline-six - also known as X6M90
- XD2 — 2.3 L (2,304 cc)
- XD2S — 2.3 L (2,304 cc), turbocharged
- XD3 — 2.5 L (2,498 cc)
- XD3T — 2.5 L (2,498 cc), turbocharged
- XD3TE — 2.5 L (2,498 cc), turbocharged with intercooler

Applications:

- Peugeot 403
- Peugeot 404
- Peugeot 504
- Peugeot 505
- Talbot Tagora 2.3 DT
- Peugeot 604
- Peugeot P4
- Peugeot J7
- Ford Granada Mk2
- Ford Sierra Mk1 2.3 D
- GAZ-24 Volga (export version)
- UAZ-469/469B (Italian export version)
- Mahindra Bolero
- Mahindra Armada
- Mahindra Scorpio
- Mahindra Xylo
- Tata Sumo
- Tata Telcoline
- Tata Sierra
- Tata Safari

A small number of these engines were also fitted into Leyland vans.

== XK/XL/XR ==
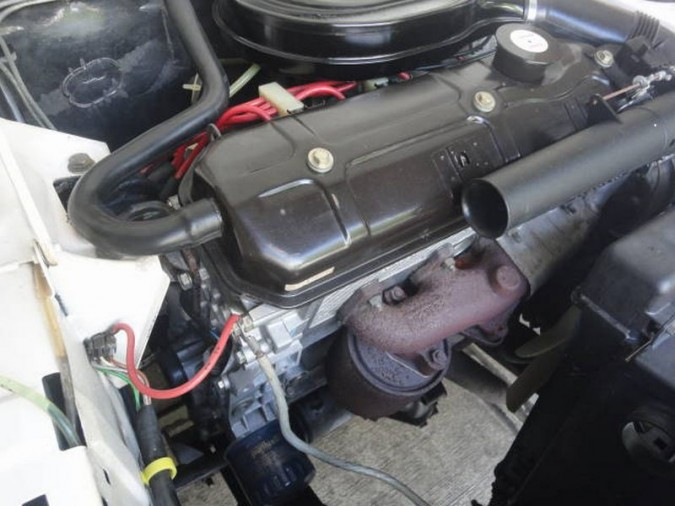
XR5 engine in 1982 Peugeot 305 GR

The XK was an all-new family of inline-four petrol and diesel engines developed for Peugeot's new 204, their first front-wheel drive car. The engine is made from aluminium and has removable cylinder liners. The engine had a distinctive design; the gearbox and differential were located directly below the engine block. This design helped Peugeot produce its first front-wheel-drive car. The original XK had an 1,130 cc displacement; later the 1.3 liter XL engine appeared and then the 1.5 liter XR series which was developed specifically for the 305. There were also diesel engines developed; the 1,255 cc XLD and the 1,357 cc XL4D. In 1979 the XID appeared, with 1,548 cc this version shared many parts with the XR petrol engine.

Both the original XK and the larger XL underwent major changes around the end of 1975, receiving shorter strokes and wider bores which ended up resulting in nearly the same displacement and with very similar outputs, albeit with lower torque.

- XK — 1.1 L (1,130 cc), 53 PS (39 kW), Peugeot 204, 1965-1969
- XK4 — 1.1 L (1,130 cc), 55 PS (40 kW), Peugeot 204, 1969-1976
- XK5 — 1.1 L (1,127 cc), 59 PS (43 kW), Peugeot 204 and 304 GL Break/Fourgonette, 1975-1980
- XL3 — 1.3 L (1,288 cc), Peugeot 304, 1969-1976
- XL3S — 1.3 L (1,288 cc) twin barrel carb, Peugeot 304 S (1972-1976) and Abarth Simca 1300 GT (1962-1965),
- XL5 — 1.3 L (1,290 cc), Peugeot 304 and 305, 1976-1986
- XL5S — 1.3 L (1,290 cc) twin carbs, Peugeot 304 SLS, 1976-1978
- XR5 — 1.5 L (1,472 cc), Peugeot 305, 1977-1983
- XR5S — 1.5 L (1,472 cc) twin carbs, Peugeot 305 S, 1980-1982
- XLD — 1.25 L (1,255 cc) diesel, Peugeot 204 Break/Fourgonette, 1968-1973
- XL4D — 1.4 L (1,357 cc) diesel, Peugeot 204 and 304, 1973-1979
- XID/XIDL — 1.55 L (1,548 cc) diesel, Peugeot 304 and 305, 1979-1982

== XM ==
The XM engine is an oversquare 1.8-liter (1796) cc was a family of inline-four petrol engines produced from 1968 to 1990. These engines have an OHV design valvetrain, with two valves per cylinder. Bore and stroke were 84 mm and 81 mm, respectively. They were carbureted and later were offered with mechanical fuel injection. The versions available were:

- XM — 1.8 L (1,796 cc) wet liner cylinder block
- KF5 — 1.8 L (1,796 cc) dry liner cylinder block (has replaceable cylinder liner)
- KF6 — 1.8 L (1,796 cc) dry liner cylinder block (has replaceable cylinder liner)
- XM7 — 1.8 L (1,796 cc) wet liner cylinder block
- XM7A — 1.8 L (1,796 cc)
- XM7P — 1.8 L (1,796 cc)
- XM7T — 1.8 L (1,796 cc)

The XM engines were used in the Peugeot 504 and Peugeot 505, as well as the Peugeot J7 and Peugeot J5 vans. The XM7 was also fitted to South African-assembled Peugeot 404 and in Iran it's installed on paykan with 4-speed manual peugeot BA7 gearbox.

== XN ==
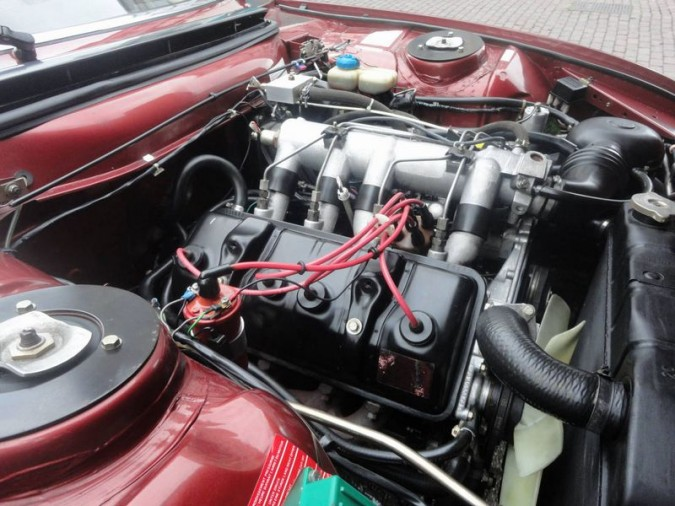
XN2 injection engine in a 1983 504 Cabriolet

The XN was a family of inline-four petrol engines closely related to the smaller XM-series, used mainly in the Peugeot 504 and 505 family cars but in certain other vehicles as well. These engines have an OHV design valvetrain, with two valves per cylinder. Bore and stroke are 88 mm and 81 mm, respectively.:

- XN1 — 2.0 L (1,971 cc). Carburetor engine.
- XN2 — 2.0 L (1,971 cc). Fuel injected, 106 hp (78 kW) at 5,200 rpm and 169 N⋅m (125 lb⋅ft) at 3,000 rpm. Equipped with Kugelfischer mechanical fuel injection, the XN2 was fitted to 504 TI and 504 Coupé/Cabriolets.
- XN6 — 2.0 L (1,971 cc). This engine had electronic fuel injection and 96 hp (71 kW). In Europe, this was only fitted to the four-cylinder 604 SR, a car only sold to French governmental agencies. The XN6 was also used in North American market 504s and 505s between model years 1980 and 1987.
- XN8 — 2.0 L (1,971 cc), lower tuned version for the Peugeot P4 only. 79 hp (58 kW) at 4,750 rpm and 149 N⋅m (110 lb⋅ft) at 2,750 rpm.

== XU ==
The XU is a family of inline-four petrol engines:

- XU5 — 1.6 L (1580 cc)
- XU7 — 1.8 L (1761 cc)
- XU8 — 1.8 L (1775 cc)
- XU9 — 1.9 L (1905 cc)
- XU10 — 2.0 L (1998 cc)

== XUD ==
The XUD is a family of inline-four diesel engines:

- XUD7 — 1.8 L (1,769 cc)
- XUD9 — 1.9 L (1,905 cc)
- XUD11 — 2.1 L (2,088 cc) or 2.1 L (2,138 cc)
