= FCA Poland =

Automobile factory in Poland

FCA Poland Sp. z o.o.

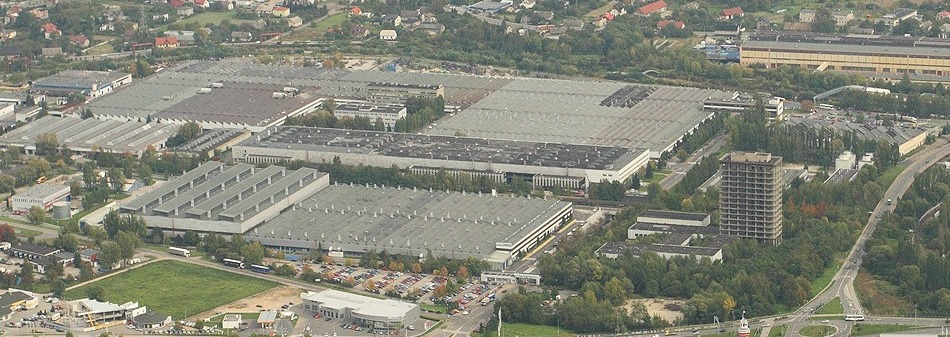
- Aerial view of the FCA Poland plant
- Formerly: Fiat Auto Poland
- Industry: Automotive
- Predecessor: Fabryka Samochodów Małolitrażowych
- Founded: 28 May 1992; 34 years ago
- Headquarters: Bielsko-Biała, Poland
- Revenue: 3,098,000,000 (2018)
- Net income: 61,100,000 (2018)
- Number of employees: 2,615 (2018)
- Parent: Stellantis
- Website: fcagroup.pl

FCA Poland Sp. z o.o. ( until April 1, 2015 "Fiat Auto Poland SA") is an automobile factory belonging to Stellantis formed on May 28, 1992, after Fiat acquired Fabryka Samochodów Małolitrażowych (FSM) in Bielsko-Biała and Tychy. At that time, Fiat Auto took over 90% of the company's shares. The takeover of FSM by Fiat has been considered hostile and controversial. The plant has been part of Stellantis since 2021, following the merger of FCA and PSA Group. As of 2020, the facility had 2,500 employees.

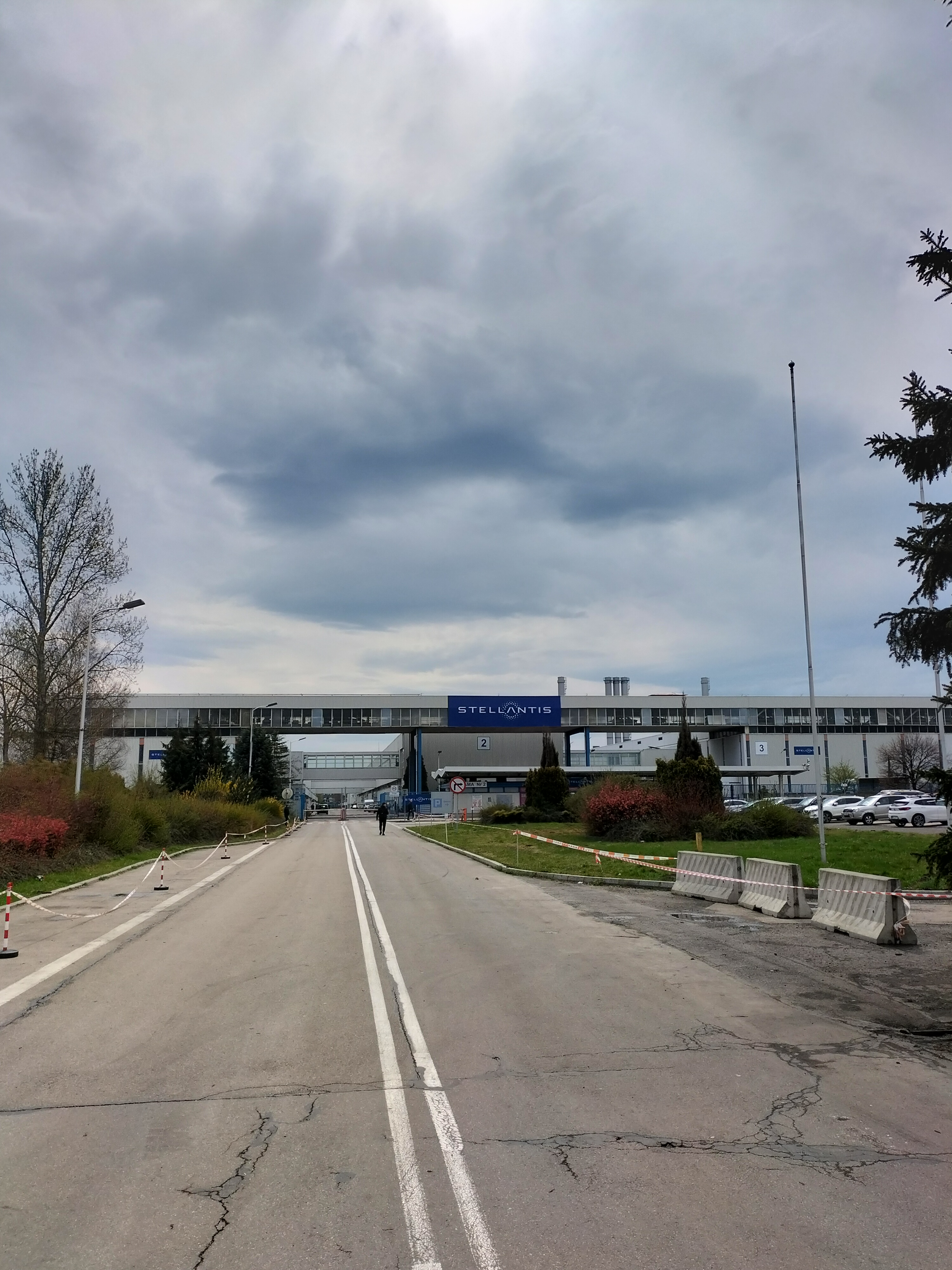

== History ==
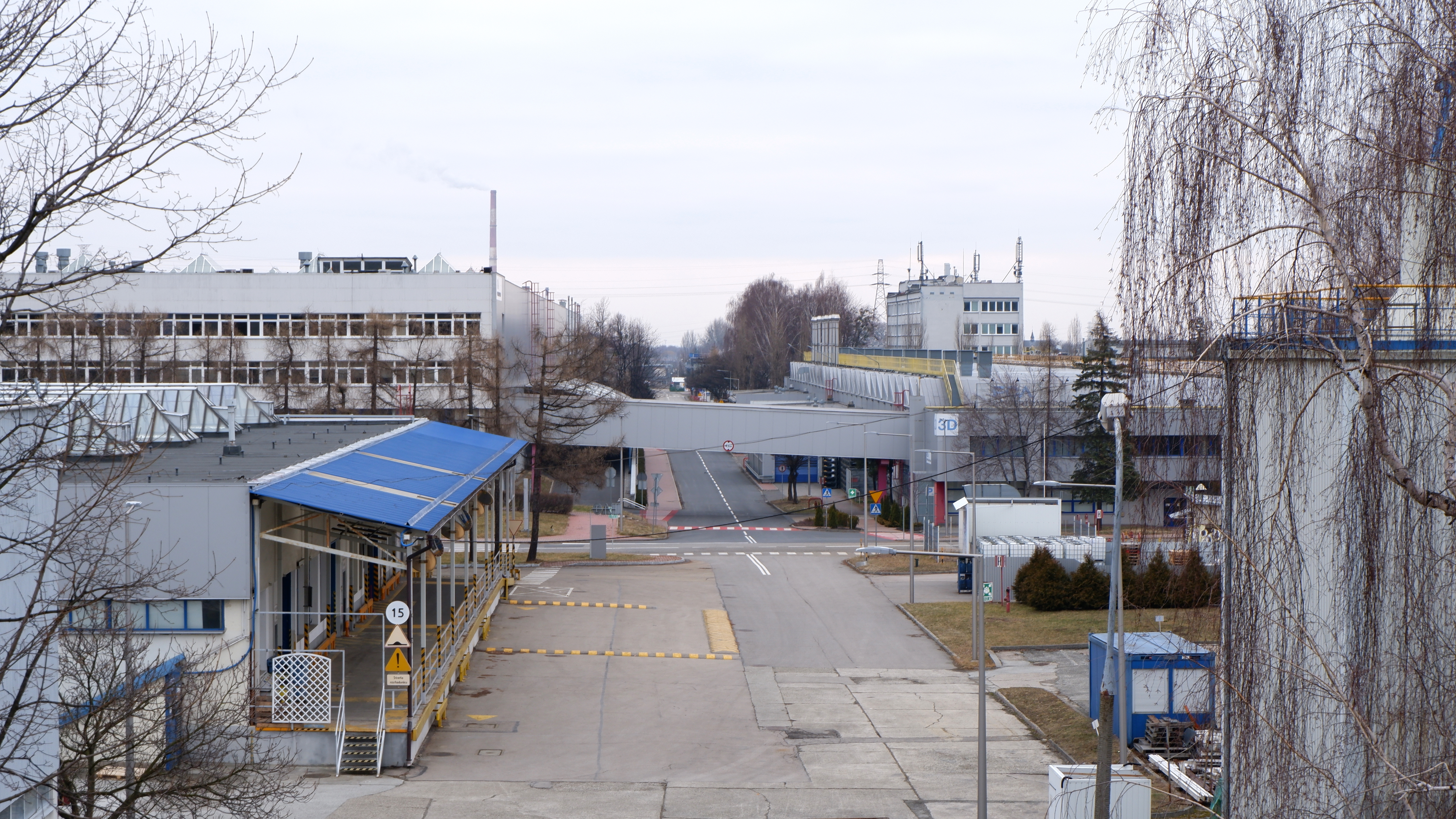
FCA Poland in Bielsko-Biała

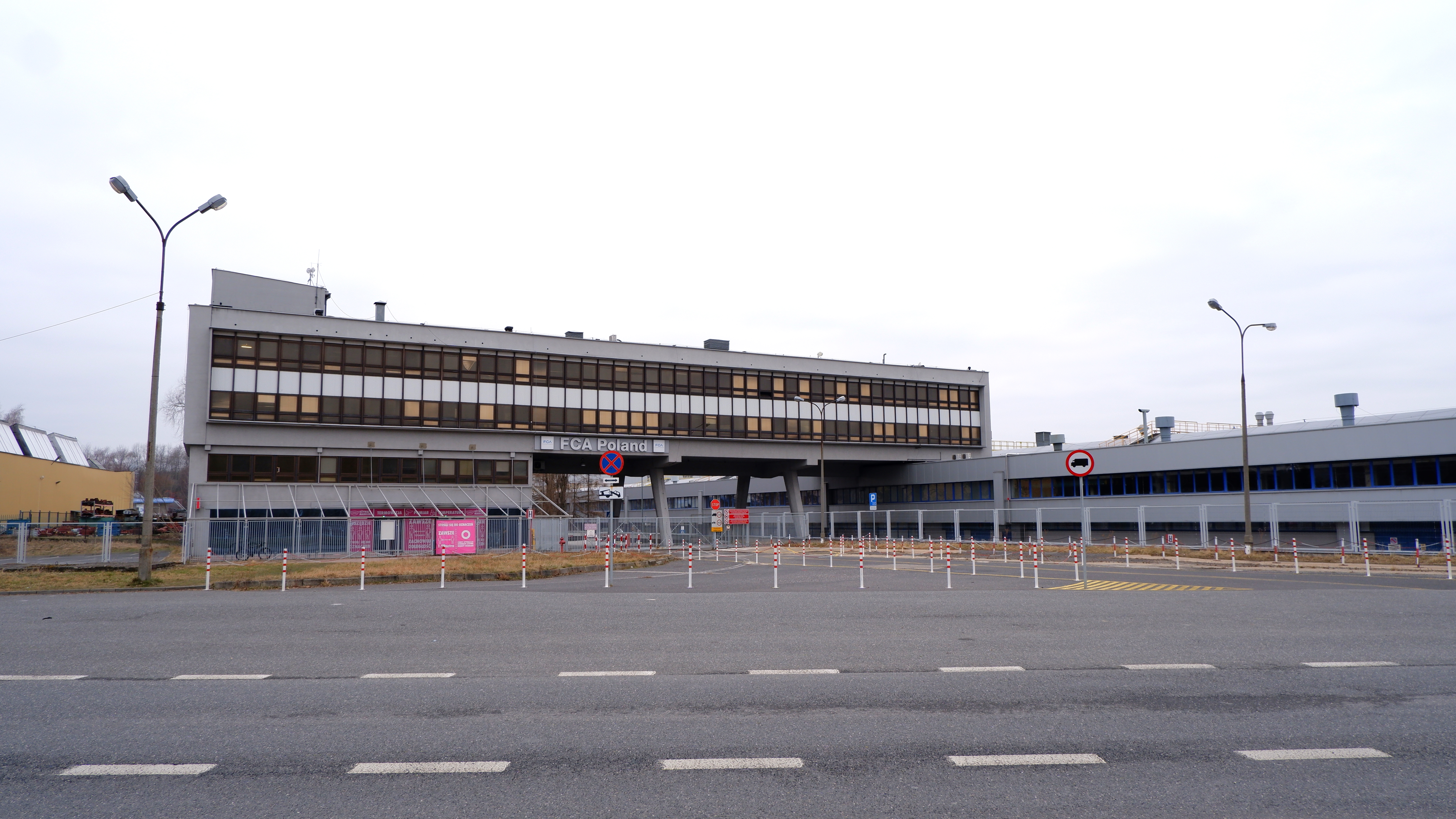
FCA Poland in Bielsko-Biała

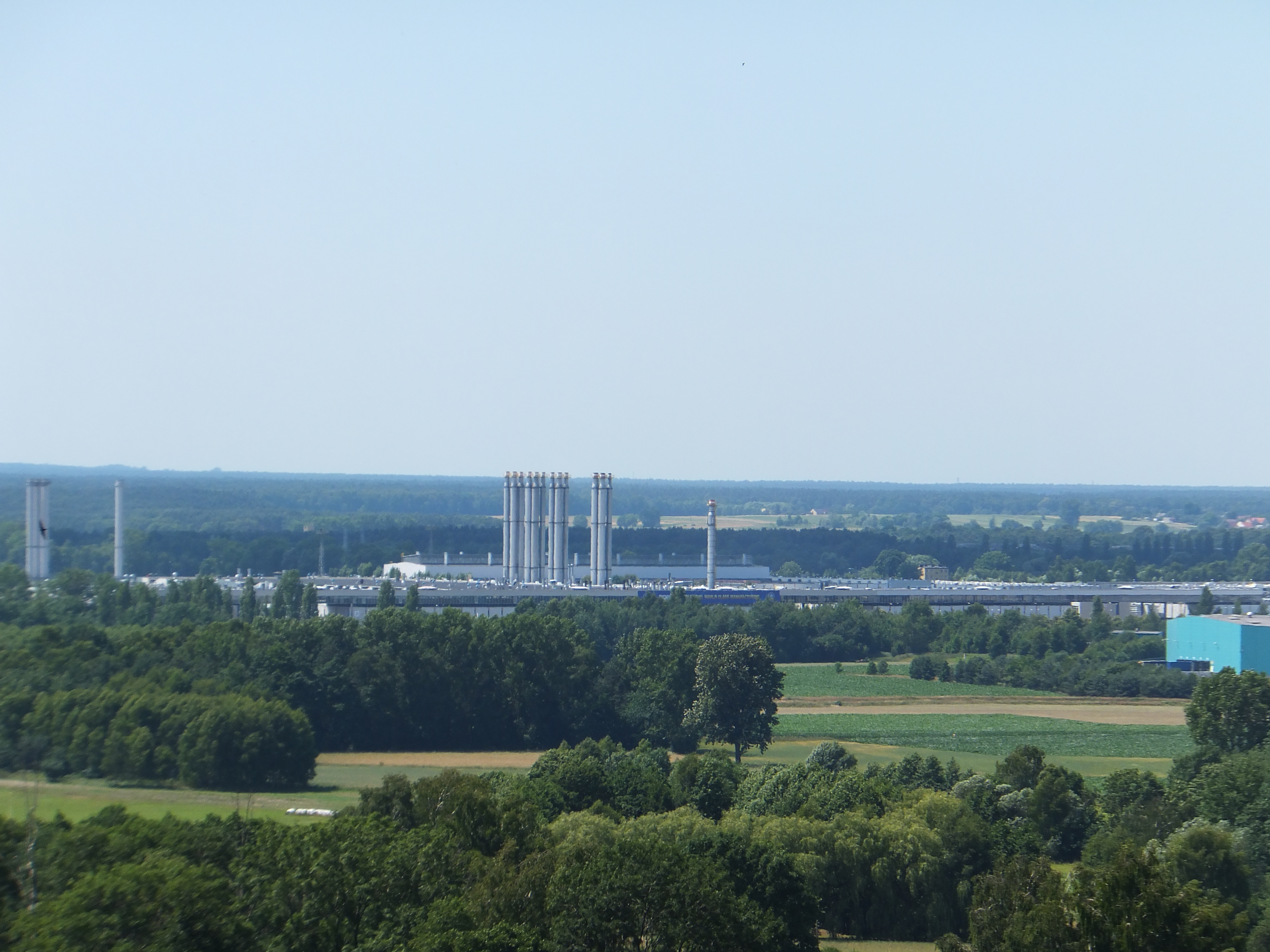
FCA Poland in Tychy

After the company was established, some of the subsidiary plants of the former FSM were taken over by enterprises belonging to the Fiat Auto group, creating their Polish branches, such as Teksid Poland, Magneti Marelli Poland.

Initially, the company produced two models, the 126 and the licensed ZX1-79, or Cinquecento. In the following years: UNO, Siena, Palio, Palio Weekend, and in Tychy Cinquecento with a 700 cm³ engine produced in Bielsko-Biała, which won second place in the 1993 European Car of the Year competition. A model with a 900 cm³ engine was supplied from Italy. In 1994, the Fiat 126 was modified. Some UNO components were also used in Cinquecento. For example, the side rear-view mirrors were the same. In December 1996, the Fiat 126 ELX was introduced with the exhaust module used in Cinquecento, it signaled exhaust gases by the colour of LEDs. This avoided using the higher-cost Lambda probe in the exhaust system.

In 1994, CKD assembly of the Uno model began in Bielsko-Biała. This was soon replaced by a full production with engines 1.4 dm³, 1.1 dm³, and 1.0 dm³. Innocenti cars with only the 1.0 dm³ engine were also manufactured. This model was supplied to the Innocenti network as Innocenti Mille (1000) to assist with pre-payment order fulfillment in the Brazilian market. Innocenti was a licensed UNO model purchased by Brazil. In 1995, the assembly of the Fiat Punto and Ducato SKDs in Tychy began, which lasted until the beginning of 2000 (from November 1999 it was the Punto II).

In June 1997, serial production of the Siena model from Brazil started at the Body Works in Bielsko-Biała, and a few months later Fiat Palio and Palio Weekend (spring 1998). In 1998, the assembly of SKD models of Bravo, Brava, Marea, Marea Weekend, and Ducato began in Tychy. It lasted until the beginning of 2000. The factory in Tychy later produced the assembly lines for Models Palio, UNO, and Palio Weekend were transferred from Bielsko-Biała.

In spring 1998 the Cinquecento was replaced by the Fiat Seicento. Until then, 1,164,478, the so-called "CC", of which 863,254 were exported. On September 22, 2000, the production of the Fiat 126 was completed in Bielsko-Biała, the final run of over 1,000 units included a sticker with "Maluch Happy End".

From May to October 2000, the production of the Uno, Siena, and Palio Weekend models was moved to Tychy. Thus, the plants in Bielsko-Biała ceased the production of cars, focusing on the production of components (engines, gearboxes). Production of Siena was discontinued in fall 2001, Uno in October 2002, and Palio Weekend in May 2004.

The cessation of car production in Bielsko-Biała resulted in the development of the production of car components, engines, and gearboxes there. Over time, the Fiat-GM Powertrain company was established to manufacture a modern 1.3 dm³ "MultiJet" diesel engine. Annually, about 700,000 jobs are created. pieces intended for over a dozen passenger cars and vans from Fiat, GM, and Suzuki groups.

In April 2003, the factory celebrated the production of the millionth Seicento, and the entire company - the sale of the three millionth car. Production of the Panda model started in May 2003 and went on sale in September of the same year. It won the title of 2004 European Car of The Year. In June 2005, Seicento was renamed the Fiat 600. In May 2007, the production of Fiat 500 was started, which was awarded the title of 2008 European Car of The Year. The launch of its production resulted in the modernization and automation of the factory, including 384 robots in the welding shop, operated by 500 employees.

On 6 September 2007, the millionth Fiat Panda was celebrated in Tychy. In the fall of 2008, production of a new version of the Ford Ka began in a joint venture. It was to produce up to 120,000 units per year, in the course of a few months of 2008 about 19,000 pieces. There were also new versions of the models produced so far. The Fiat 500 Abarth made its debut at the Geneva Motor Show in March 2008. It has been produced since 2008 in Tychy. In 2008, 5,905 units of this version were made, and in 2009, about 8,000.

The initial production capacity of the Fiat 500 was 500 units per day or to around 120,000 cars per year. In 2007, 65,116 units were produced. However, the enormous market interest resulted in a gradual increase in this capacity. The modernisation of the plant was undertaken. Since March 2008, production has increased to 750 units per day, which is around 180,000 per year. By working on Saturdays and shortened holiday breaks, a total of 195,637 Fiat 500s were produced in 2008.

In 2007, the Fiat Auto Poland plant in Tychy joined the group of "World Class Manufacturing" operations, a select few that have and use the best and most effective methods of managing the production system on a global scale. This is the result of a long process of refinement since the plant was incorporated into the Fiat Auto structure. The plant in Tychy was, among others the first of the Fiat Auto Group to implement ISO 9001 (quality management standards) and ISO 14001 (environmental management standards) since the mid-1990s. The solutions adopted in the plant in Tychy later became a model for solutions implemented in other factories of the group. A production system was also implemented in it, which contributes to the fact that cars leaving the production line have a low rate of detected production defects and defects occurring in subsequent years of operation. At the same time, there are critical voices saying that the increase in quality and efficiency comes at the expense of the work atmosphere and the situation of employees.

Cars produced by Fiat Auto Poland are exported to 68 countries, including to Japan (where 4,174 cars were shipped in 2008), and these exports account for approximately 3% of the value of all transactions of this type nationwide.

In the mid-2000s, Fiat Auto Poland produced about 300-350 thousand. cars per year. In 2008, a record number of 492,885 cars were produced, including 19,046 second-generation Ford Ka, the production of which was officially launched on September 25, 2008, in Tychy. In 2009, the plant produced about 606,000 cars. The Fiat 500C convertible made its debut at the Geneva Motor Show in March 2009. In mid-2010, the production of the Fiat 600 model ceased.

The production of the next generation of Fiat Panda was moved from Tychy to the factory in Pomigliano d'Arco near Naples, in exchange for the Lancia Ypsilon model, which had been produced so far in Termini Imerese in Sicily. In mid-2011, the production of Lancia Ypsilon II began in the Tychy plant. In December 2012, approximately 1,500 employees were laid off along with a cut production as well as terminating production of the Panda. The company's total revenues in 2012 exceeded PLN 14,150 million, sales revenues amounted to over PLN 14,100 million.

The plant in Tychy in 2009 was the largest Fiat factory in Europe and the second largest in the world, after the Brazilian factory in Betim.

Stellantis will invest 755 million zlotys ($203.99 million) in the plant where new hybrid and electric Jeep, Fiat and Alfa Romeo models will be built, according to Deputy Prime Minister Jaroslaw Gowin. The new cars will start to leave the factory in 2022.

Production of the Jeep Avenger begins January 31, 2023.

== Production ==
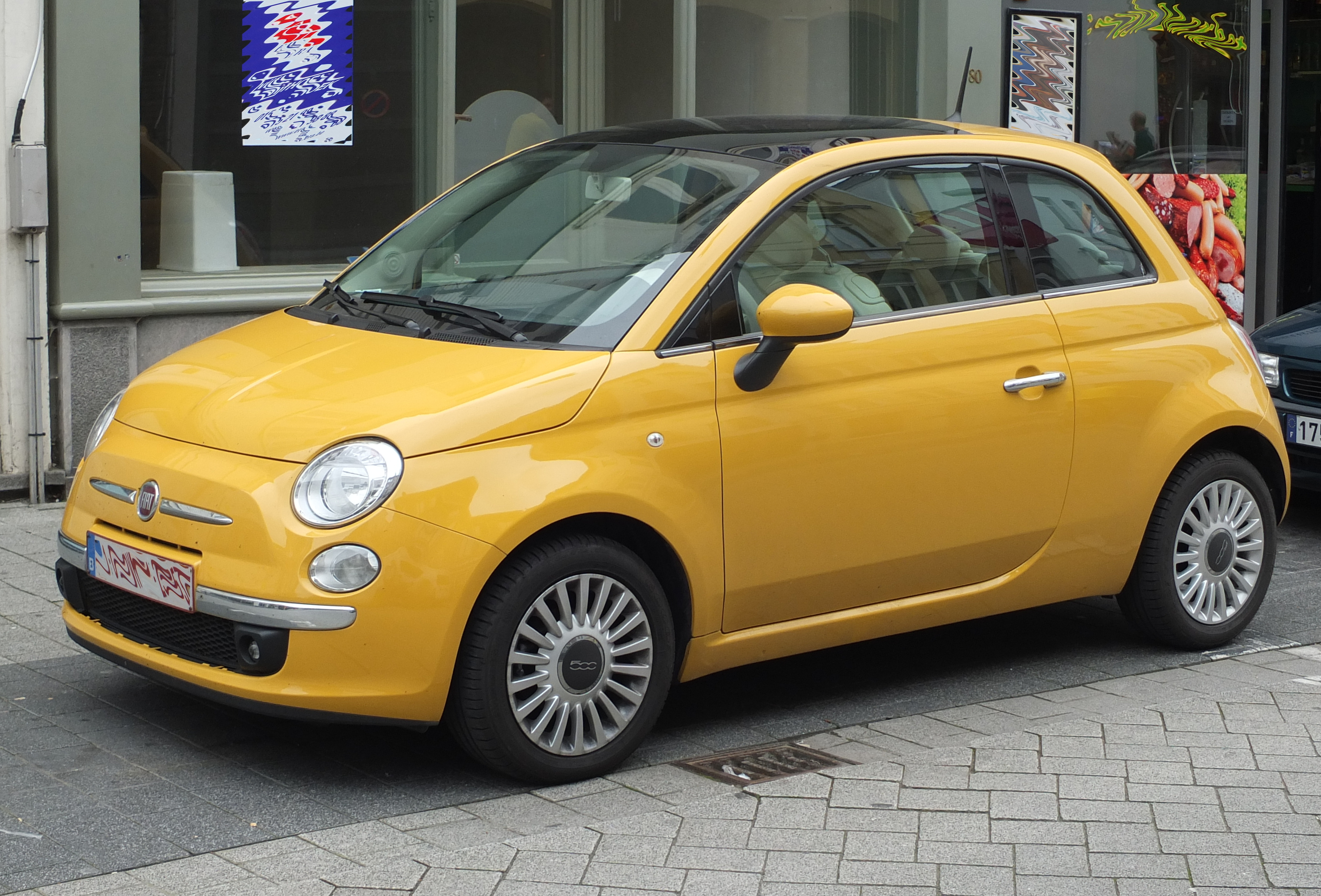
2007 Fiat 500

=== Current ===
- Jeep Avenger (2023–present)
- Fiat 600 (2024–present)
- Alfa Romeo Junior (2024–present)

=== Historical production ===
FSM / FCA Poland production:

- FSO Syrena : 344,099 units, from 1971 to 1983, in Bielsko-Biala
- Fiat 126P : 3.318.674 units, including 1 152 325 from 1973 to 2000 in Bielsko-Biala and 2 166 349 from 1975 to 1991 in Tychy
- Fiat 127 : 380 units, from 1973 to 1974, in Bielsko-Biala
- Fiat Cinquecento : 1.164.525 units, from December 1991 to 1998, in Tychy
- Fiat Uno : 188.190 units, from 1994 à 2002, including 144 826 in Bielsko-Biala and 28 590 in Tychy
- Fiat Siena I : 50.151 units, from 1997 to 2002, including 46 637 in Bielsko-Biala and 3 514 in Tychy
- Fiat Palio Weekend : 34.138 units, from 1997 to 2004, including 21 773 in Bielsko-Biala and 12 365 in Tychy
- Fiat Seicento/600 : 1.328.973 units, from December 1997 to 2010, in Tychy
- Innocenti Mille : 14.774 units, from 1995 to 1997, in Bielsko-Biala
- Fiat Panda II : 2.168.491 units, from 2003 to 2012, in Tychy
- Fiat 500/Abarth 500 : 2.500.000 units at March 2021, in Tychy
- Ford Ka II : 501.670 ex. units at 1st April 2016, in Tychy
- Lancia Ypsilon : 266.557 units. at 1st April 2016, in Tychy
- Fiat 500 (2007–2024)
- Leapmotor T03 (2024–2025)

During late 1990s and until 2000, some Fiat vehicles have been assembled as SKD in Tychy:

- Fiat Punto : 57.026 units
- Fiat Bravo/a : 22,964 units, including 19,122 Brava and 3,842 Bravo
- Fiat Ducato : 2,893 units
- Iveco Daily : 2,732 units
- Fiat Marea : 2,846 units
