= Jeep Avenger =

Subcompact crossover SUV

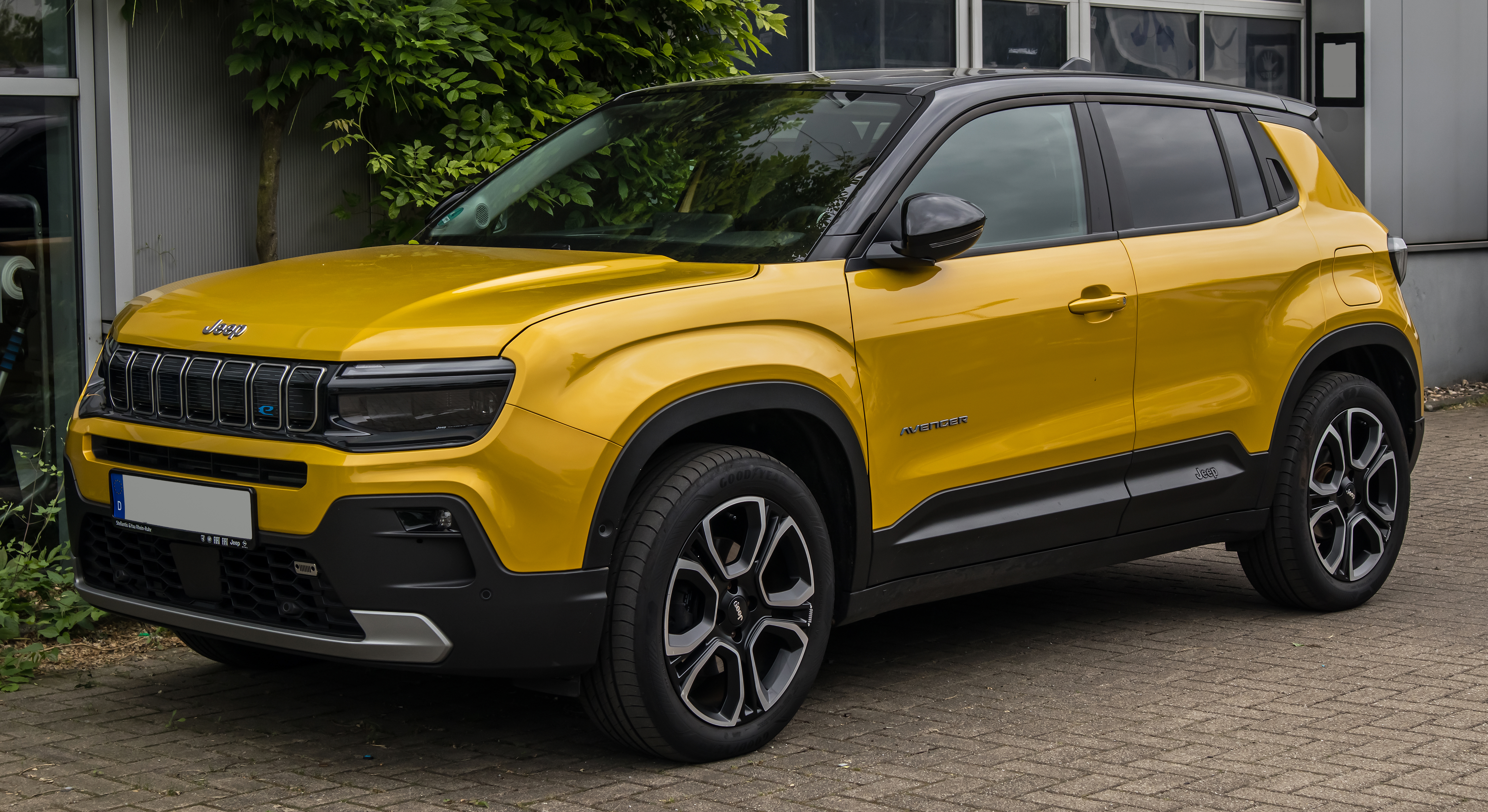

Overview
- Manufacturer: Jeep (Stellantis)
- Production: 2023–present
- Assembly: Poland: Tychy (FCA Poland); Brazil: Porto Real (Stellantis do Brasil)
- Designer: Daniele Calonaci

Body and chassis
- Class: Subcompact crossover SUV (B)
- Body style: 5-door SUV
- Layout: Front-engine, front-wheel-drive; Front-engine, all-wheel-drive (4xe); Front-motor, front-wheel-drive (EV)
- Platform: Common Modular Platform
- Related: Fiat 600; Alfa Romeo Junior; Peugeot 2008 II; Peugeot 208 II; Opel Mokka B; Opel Corsa F; DS 3 Crossback

Powertrain
- Engine: Petrol: 1.0 L GSE FireFly I3 flex fuel turbo mild hybrid; 1.2 THP (EB2ADTD) I3 turbo mild hybrid
- Power output: 101 PS (100 hp; 74 kW) (petrol); 110 PS (108 hp; 81 kW) (mild hybrid); 145 PS (143 hp; 107 kW) (mild hybrid 4xe); 156 PS (154 hp; 115 kW) (EV)
- Transmission: 7-speed CVT; 6-speed manual; 6-speed e-DCT
- Hybrid drivetrain: Mild hybrid
- Battery: 54 kWh lithium-ion (EV)
- Electric range: 400 km (250 mi) (EV, WLTP)
- Plug-in charging: 11 kW (AC); 100 kW (DC)

Dimensions
- Wheelbase: 2,560 mm (100.8 in)
- Length: 4,084 mm (160.8 in)
- Width: 1,776 mm (69.9 in)
- Height: 1,528 mm (60.2 in)
- Curb weight: 1,182–1,536 kg (2,606–3,386 lb)

The Jeep Avenger is a subcompact crossover SUV (B-segment) produced by Jeep since January 2023 mainly for the European market. Based on the Common Modular Platform closely shared with the second-generation Peugeot 2008 and positioned below the Renegade, it is the smallest vehicle offered by Jeep.

The "Avenger" nameplate has previously been used by Chrysler, previous parent company of Jeep on two previous occasions, namely the Dodge Avenger (a North American product) on sale between 1994 and 2000, then 2008–2014; and before that on the Hillman Avenger (built by Chrysler's long defunct European division) in the 1970s.

== Overview ==
The Avenger was presented on 8 September 2022 and at the 2022 Paris Motor Show in October. It is offered with mild hybrid and battery electric models. It uses the STLA Small platform, a development from the CMP platform (eCMP for the electric model) originally developed by the PSA Group, and shared with the Peugeot 2008, Opel Mokka and DS 3 Crossback.

The Avenger offers a 200 mm (7.9 in) ground clearance, 20 degrees of approach angle, and 32 degrees of departure angle. It is also equipped with Jeep's "Selec-Terrain" drive mode (with Normal, Eco, Sport, Snow, Mud, and Sand modes) and Hill Descent Control.

Designed in Italy and manufactured in Poland, the Avenger is primarily marketed in Europe, with sales in Turkey, Morocco, Japan and South Korea also planned. It is not available in the United States, Canada, and China. Deliveries to customers started in early 2023, with Jeep targeting annual production of 110,000 units.

=== Avenger EV ===
The battery electric version was available before the petrol-powered model, and is the sole version of the Avenger in most markets. It is equipped with a 400 V front-mounted electric motor manufactured by Emotors, producing 156 PS (154 hp; 115 kW) and 260 N⋅m (26.5 kg⋅m; 192 lb⋅ft) of torque. Equipped with a 54 kWh battery, the Avenger EV offers a WLTP range of up to 400 km (250 mi) (550 km (340 mi) in urban cycle).

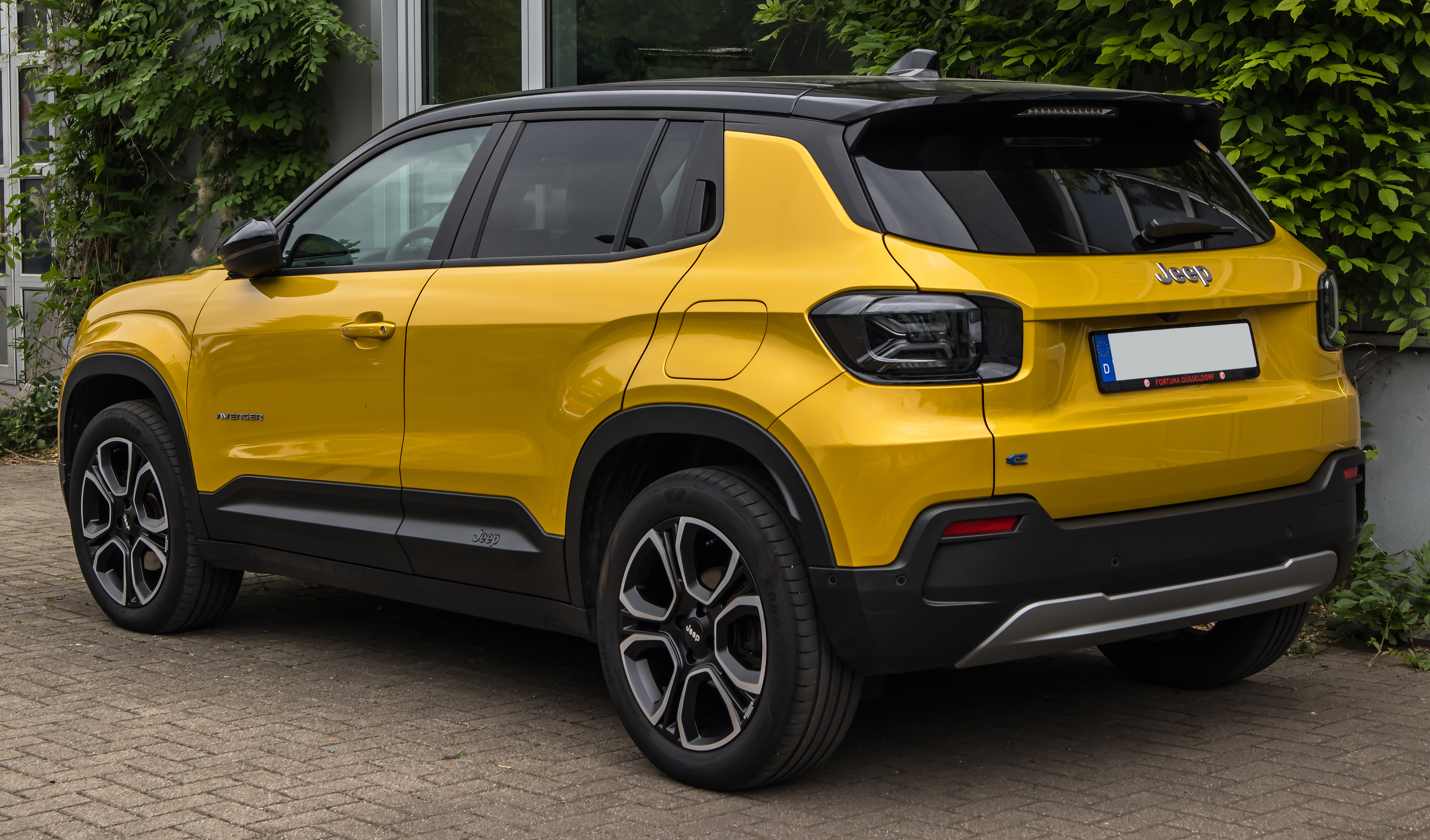
Rear view

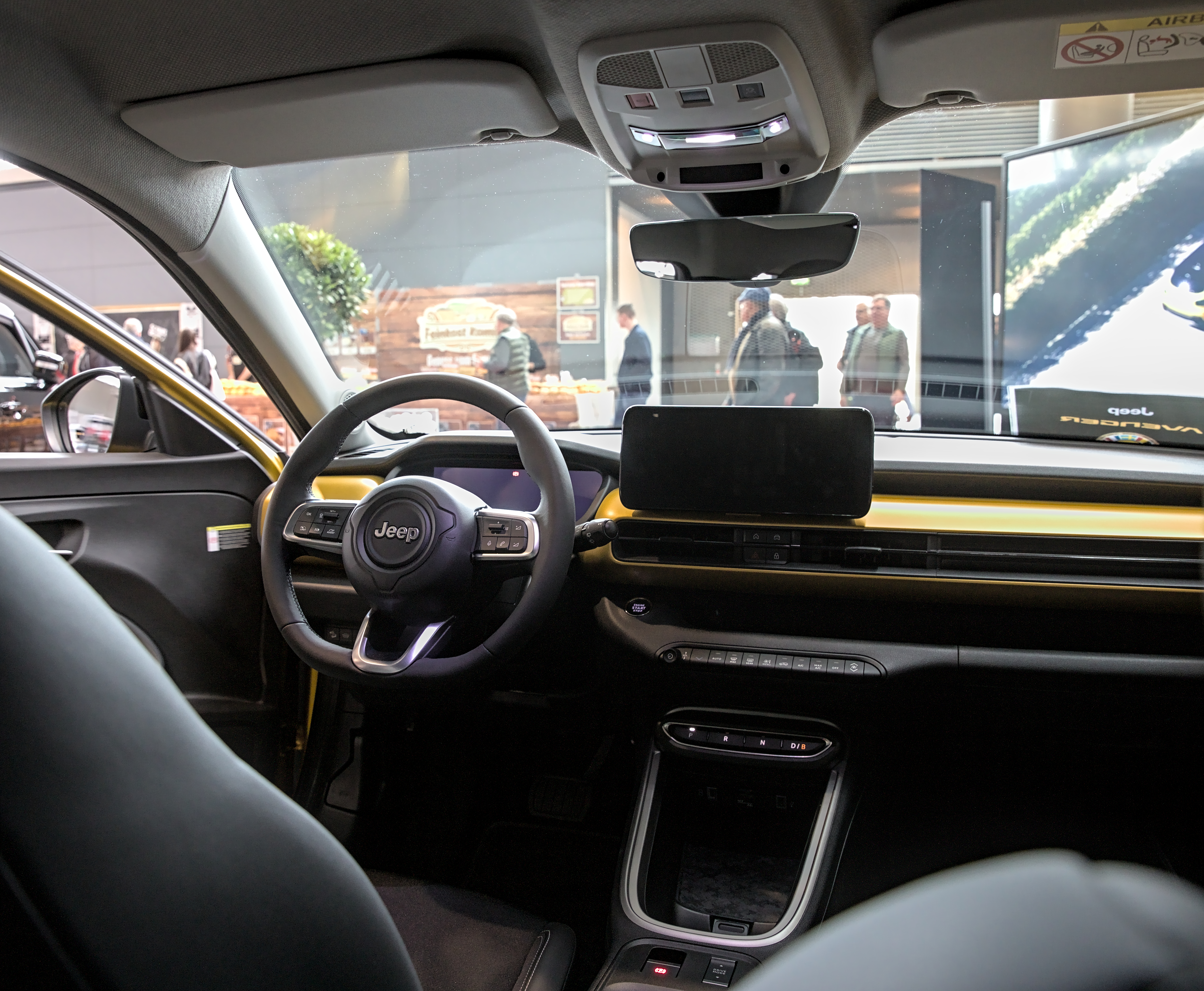
Interior

== Avenger 4xe ==
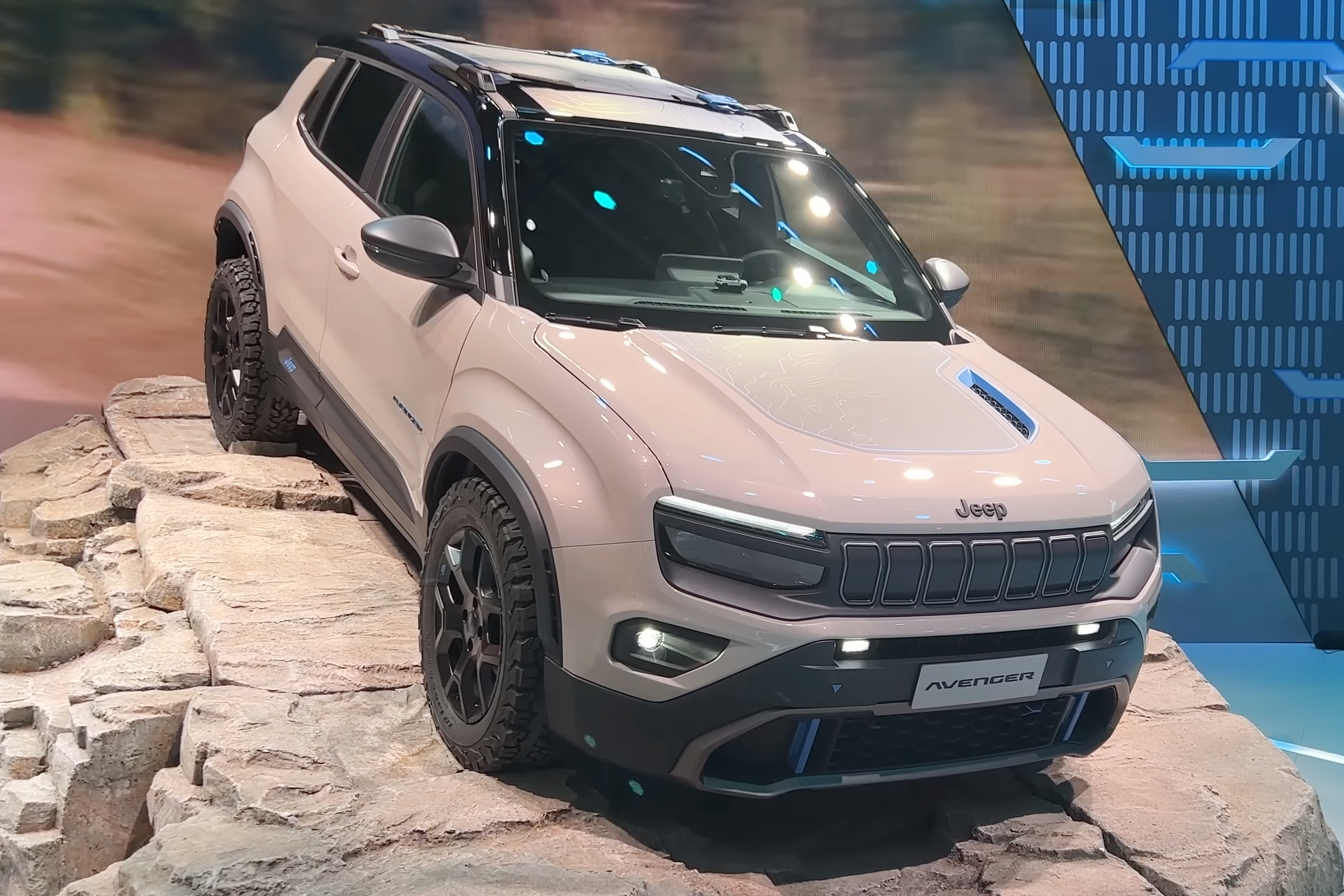
Jeep Avenger 4xe Concept

The four-wheel-drive version of the Avenger was preceded by the Jeep Avenger 4xe concept car, (alternatively referred to as the Avenger 4x4) presented at the 2022 Paris Motor Show in October. It is distinguished by more off-road customization elements (fender wideners, towing hooks, tyres, roof loading system) and by a heightening of 200 mm (7.9 in).

The production version was introduced in February 2024 as the Avenger 4xe, which is powered by a 1.2-litre mild hybrid powertrain. It has two 21 kW (28 hp; 29 PS) electric motors mounted on the rear axle and the 6-speed dual-clutch transmission.

== Mild hybrid (e-Hybrid) ==
In 2024, the e-Hybrid variant was added to the range, featuring a 48 V mild-hybrid system pairing the 1.2-litre turbo petrol engine with a 21 kW electric motor integrated into a 6-speed dual-clutch gearbox. Compared to the petrol-only model, fuel consumption is reduced by 13% on the combined cycle and by 28% in urban driving, with CO₂ emissions of 111 g/km. The system allows the vehicle to run on electric power alone for up to 1 km and operates in full-electric mode for over 50% of the time in city traffic.

== Awards ==
- The Avenger has been named European Car of the Year 2023 at the Brussels Motor Show. It is the brand's first model to win the prestigious European Car of the Year Award.
- The Avenger claims overall 'Electric Car of the Year' as well as 'Best Electric City Car' in the Top Gear Electric Awards 2023.
- In 2023, the Avenger won a media award of "Best Family SUV 2023", which was provided by Women's World Car of the Year.

== Safety ==
ANCAP test results Jeep Avenger (2024, aligned with Euro NCAP)
Test	Points	%
Overall:	3 /5 stars	
Adult occupant:	31.77	79%
Child occupant:	34.97	79%
Pedestrian:	37.60	59%
Safety assist:	9.81	54%

Euro NCAP test results Jeep Avenger (LHD) (2024)
Test	Points	%
Overall:	3 /5 stars	
Adult occupant:	31.8	79%
Child occupant:	34.4	70%
Pedestrian:	37.5	59%
Safety assist:	9.6	53%
