= Fiat 600 (2023) =

Crossover SUV produced by Fiat since 2023

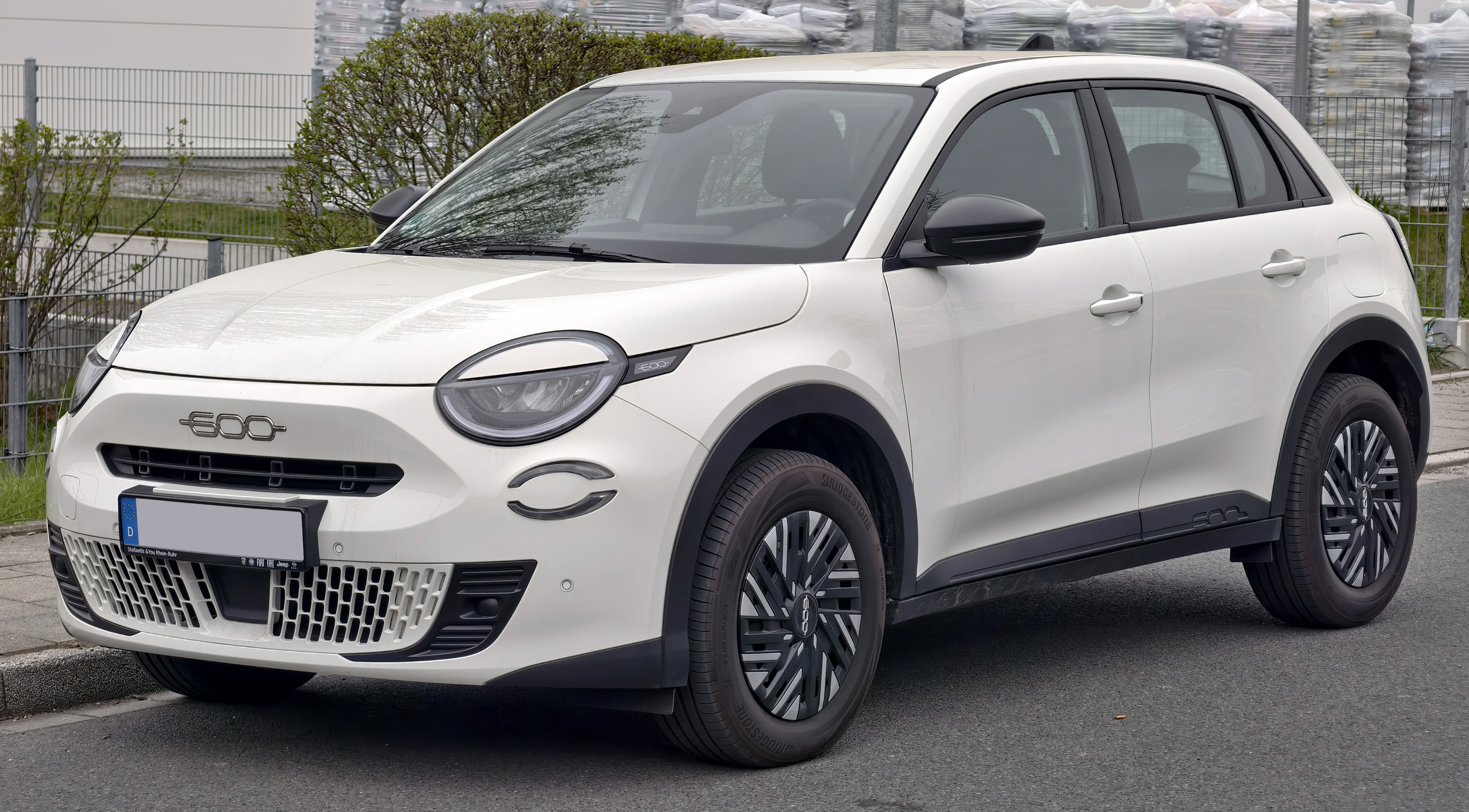
- Fiat 600 Hybrid

Overview
- Manufacturer: Fiat (Stellantis)
- Model code: F364
- Also called: Abarth 600e
- Production: September 2023 – present
- Assembly: Poland: Tychy (FCA Poland)
- Designer: Dario Pellegrino under François Leboine

Body and chassis
- Class: Subcompact crossover SUV
- Body style: 5-door SUV
- Layout: FF
- Platform: Common Modular Platform
- Related: Jeep Avenger; Alfa Romeo Junior; Peugeot 2008 II; Peugeot 208 II; Opel Mokka B; Opel Corsa F; DS 3 Crossback

Powertrain
- Engine: Mild hybrid petrol: 1.2 EB2ADTS THP turbo I3
- Power output: 100 PS (99 hp; 74 kW); 156 PS (154 hp; 115 kW) (600e); 240 PS (237 hp; 177 kW) (Abarth 600e); 280 PS (276 hp; 206 kW) (Abarth 600e Scorpionissima)
- Transmission: 6-speed DCT
- Hybrid drivetrain: Mild Hybrid
- Battery: 54 kWh lithium-ion (600e)
- Electric range: 406–409 km (250–250 mi) (WLTP, combined)
- Plug-in charging: 11 kW (AC); 100 kW (DC)

Dimensions
- Wheelbase: 2,562 mm (100.9 in)
- Length: 4,171 mm (164.2 in)
- Width: 1,781 mm (70.1 in)
- Height: 1,523 mm (60.0 in)
- Kerb weight: 1,520 kg (3,351 lb)

Chronology
- Predecessor: Fiat 500L

The Fiat 600 is a subcompact crossover SUV (B-segment) produced by Fiat since 2023 mainly for the European market. The battery electric version named the Fiat 600e was unveiled on 4 July 2023, coinciding with the anniversary of the original Fiat 500. The petrol-powered, mild hybrid version was released in September 2023.

== History ==
The Fiat 600 nameplate was previously used by Fiat in the 1950s and 1960s. In 1997, the nameplate was reused by spelling out the number in the Italian language for the Fiat Seicento. Developed under the project code F364 by Fiat Chrysler Automobiles, the 600 is manufactured in Poland alongside the Jeep Avenger on the Stellantis Common Modular Platform (eCMP) platform, a development of the internal combustion CMP and electric eCMP vehicle architectures developed by Groupe PSA.

The 600 does not directly replace the Fiat 500X, which remained in the range until 2024. For the United States market, after the 500X is discontinued, it will not be replaced. The 600 will be sold only in European markets, plus select overseas markets such as Chile.

=== Design ===
The 600 features design cues similar to the third-generation Fiat 500e, such as circular headlights and a 600 badge above the front grille. In June 2023, Fiat announced they would no longer sell cars painted grey; the 600 is the first model to conform to this new philosophy, and will be offered in four finishes named Sun, Sea, Earth, or Sky of Italy, corresponding to orange (Arancia Sole d'Italia), green (Verde Mare d'Italia), sand (Sabbia Terra d'Italia), or blue (Azzuro Cielo d'Italia) colors, respectively.

The interior of the 600 is similar to both the 500e and the Jeep Avenger, borrowing the steering wheel and climate controls from the former and the center console from the latter. The entry-level models will bear the Product Red trim, available in black, white, or red exterior colors, and Fiat will offer an upgraded La Prima trim with interior upgrades and the four Italy-inspired exterior colors.

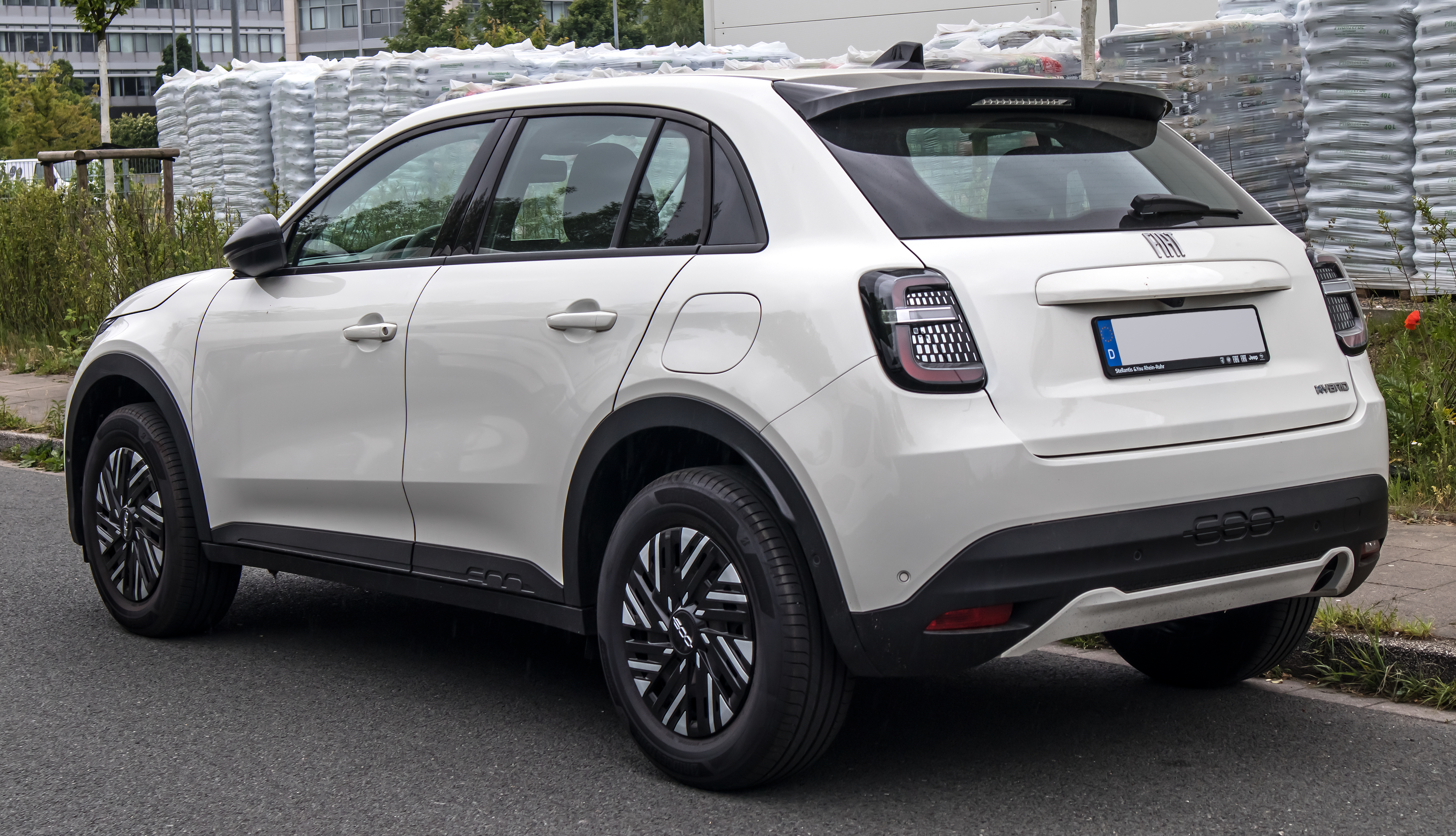
Rear view

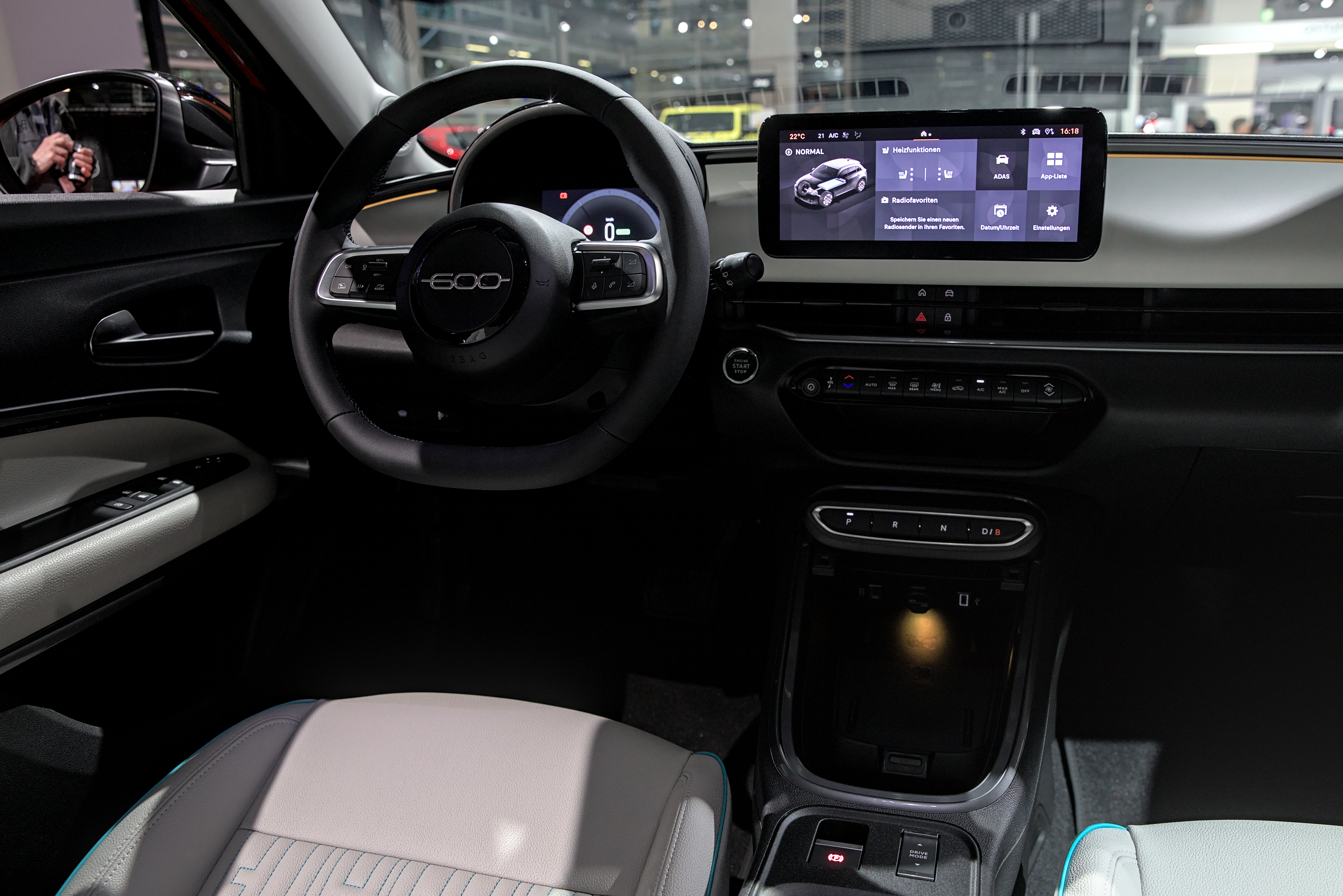
Interior

== Powertrain ==
The battery electric version, the 600e is equipped with a 54 kWh battery with an estimated range of 250 mi (400 km) under the WLTP testing cycle. DC fast charging is possible at a maximum rate of 100 kW. It has a single electric traction motor, driving the front wheels with a maximum output of 154 hp (115 kW). These specifications match that of the Avenger, which is a front-wheel drive vehicle with a maximum torque output of 192 lb⋅ft (260 N⋅m).

A model with a mild hybrid petrol engine was added by mid-2024. It consists of a 1.2 L Puretech petrol hybrid that makes 136 HP and is paired with an eDCT 6-Speed automatic where the 21 kW electric motor, inverter, and transmission central unit live, as well as a belt alternator starter. It has a 48 Volt electrical system including an electric motor that assists the engine in powering the vehicle.

From March 2026, the 1.2 Turbo 100‑hp version with a six‑speed manual gearbox (without the hybrid module) is also offered.

== Abarth 600e ==
In February 2024, Abarth unveiled the first image of the Abarth 600e, a performance-oriented version of the standard 600e, while the car was undergoing its final testing. Its interior was unveiled on 2 April 2024. The car was fully unveiled on 28 October 2024. All trims except for the "Scorpionissima" trim produce 240 PS (177 kW; 237 hp) and 254 lb⋅ft (344 N⋅m) of torque, while the "Scorpionissima" trim produces 280 PS (206 kW; 276 hp) and the same torque.

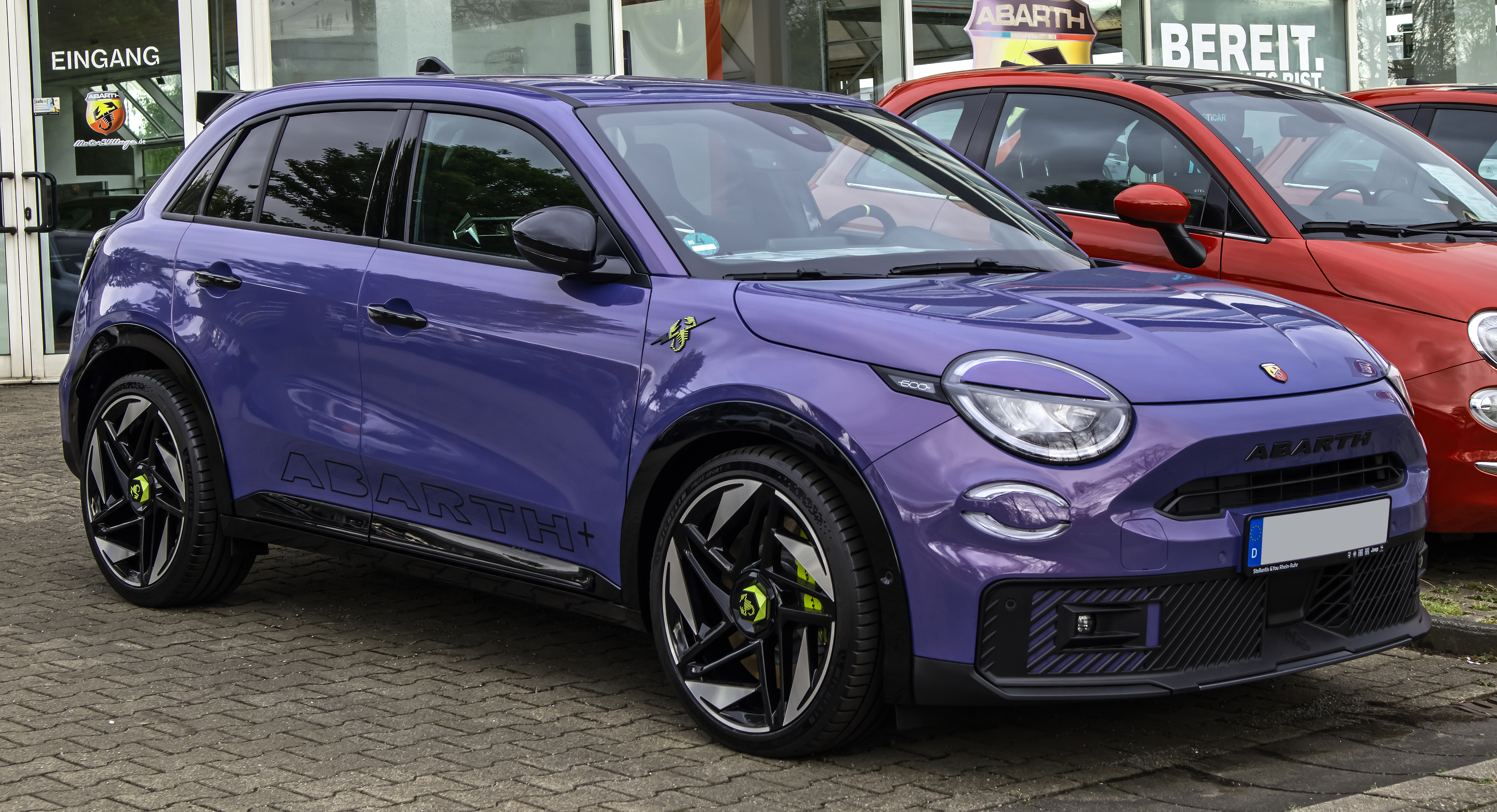
Abarth 600e

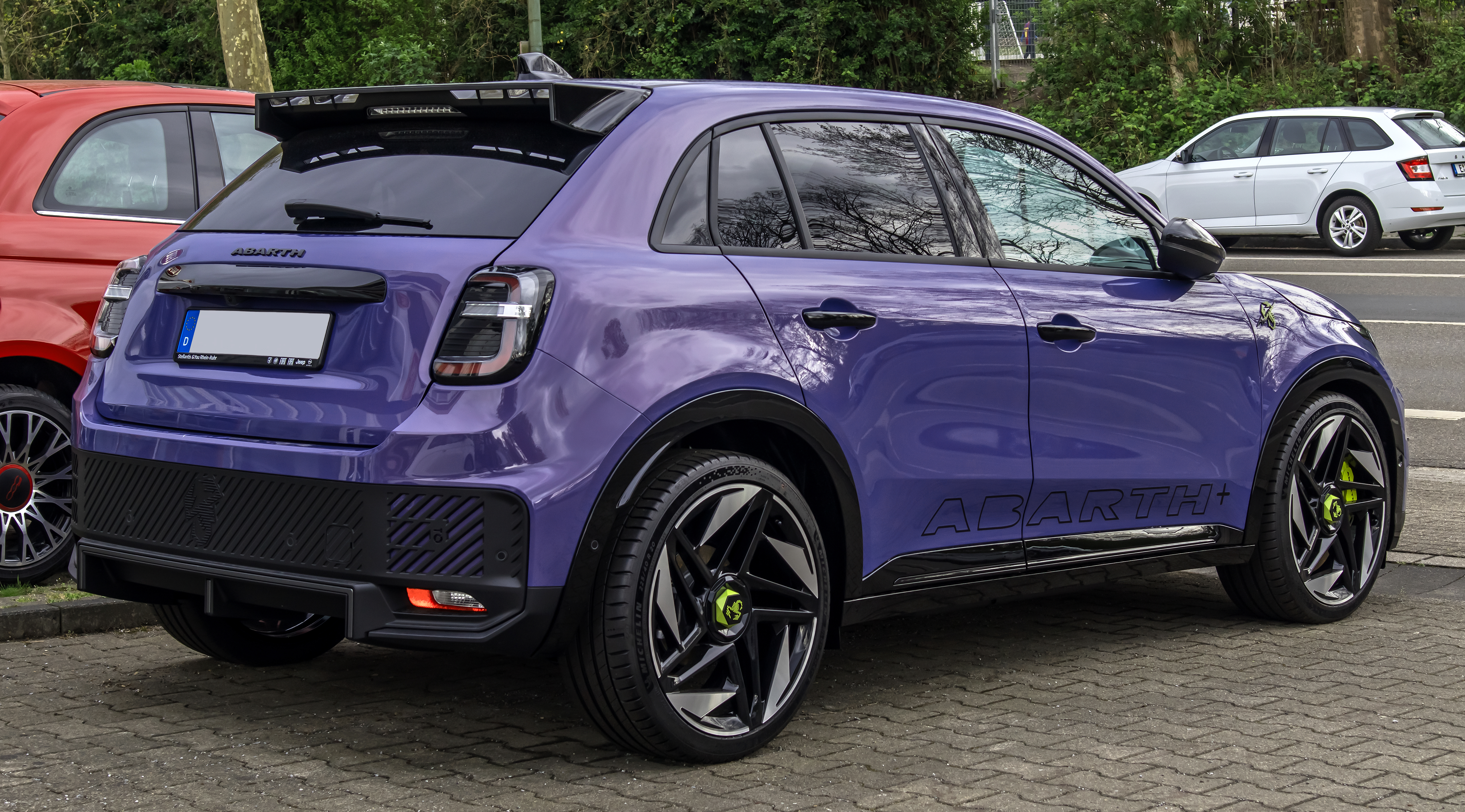
Rear view

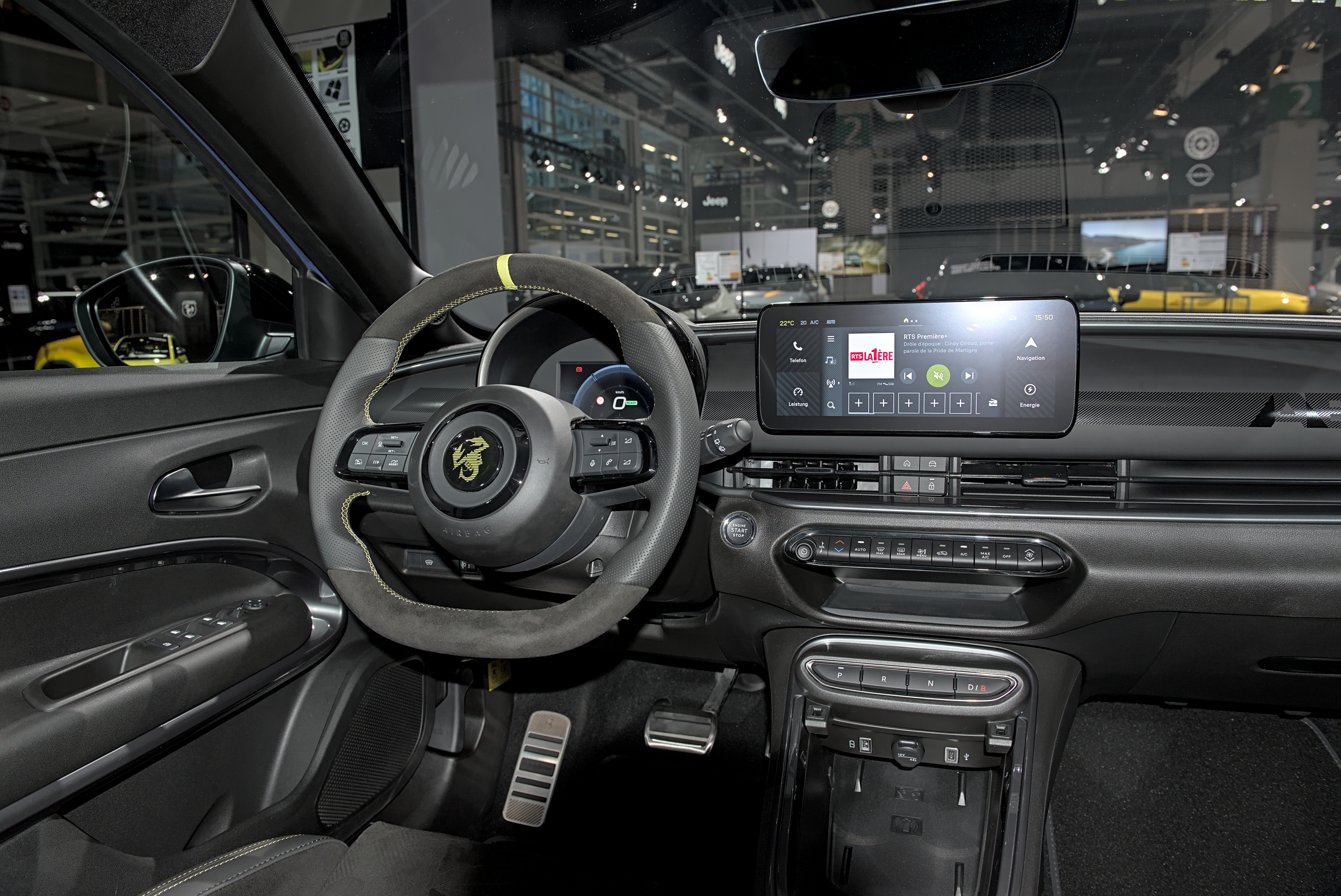
Interior
