= Alfa Romeo Junior (2024) =

Subcompact crossover SUV

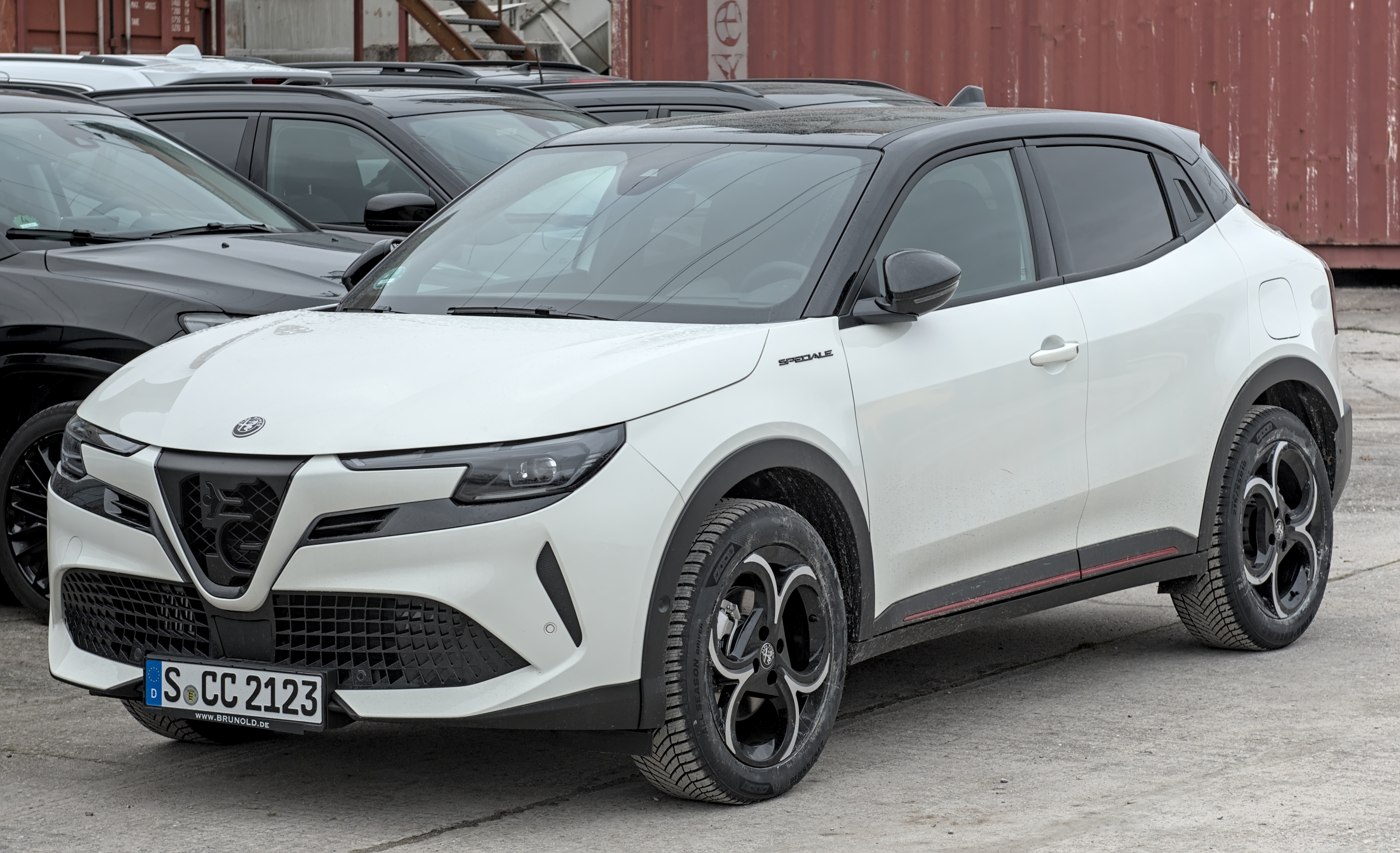
- Alfa Romeo Junior Ibrida Speciale (Germany)

Overview
- Manufacturer: Alfa Romeo
- Also called: Alfa Romeo Milano (pre-production)
- Production: 2024–present
- Assembly: Poland: Tychy (FCA Poland)
- Designer: Centro Stile Alfa Romeo under Alejandro Mesonero-Romanos

Body and chassis
- Class: Subcompact crossover SUV (B)
- Body style: 5-door SUV
- Layout: Petrol: Front-engine, front-wheel-drive / Front-engine, four-wheel-drive; Electric: Front-motor, front-wheel-drive
- Platform: Common Modular Platform
- Related: Peugeot 2008 II; Opel Mokka B; Jeep Avenger; Fiat 600 (2023); DS 3 Crossback; Peugeot 208 II; Opel Corsa F; Lancia Ypsilon IV

Powertrain
- Engine: Petrol: 1.2 THP (EB2ADTS) I3 turbo mild hybrid
- Electric motor: 28 PS (21 kW) 48 volt Motor in Transmission; Permanent magnet syncronus motor (Junior Elettrica, Speciale & Veloce)
- Power output: Petrol: 136 PS (100 kW); EV: 156–280 PS (115–206 kW)
- Transmission: 6-speed e-DCT
- Hybrid drivetrain: 48 volt MHEV (1.2)
- Battery: 54 kWh lithium-ion battery
- Electric range: 347–410 km (216–255 mi)

Dimensions
- Wheelbase: 2,550 mm (100.4 in)
- Length: 4,170 mm (164.2 in)
- Width: 1,780 mm (70.1 in)
- Height: 1,500 mm (59.1 in)
- Kerb weight: 1,380–1,635 kg (3,042–3,605 lb)

The Alfa Romeo Junior (Type 966) is a subcompact crossover SUV (B-segment) produced by the Italian company Alfa Romeo since 2024. At its introduction, it is the smallest Alfa Romeo currently on sale.

During its introduction, the Junior was launched as the Alfa Romeo Milano. Following a complaint from the Italian government that claimed it is illegal to sell "Italian-sounding" products that were not produced in Italy, Alfa Romeo renamed the vehicle to Junior. The nameplate was previously used by the brand for entry models of the 105- and 115-series Giulia coupes as well as Zagato-bodied Giulias in the 1960s and 1970s. The previous name, Milano was the US-market name for the Alfa Romeo 75 saloon, and a reference to Alfa Romeo's hometown, Milan.

== Overview ==
The vehicle was revealed on 10 April 2024 as the Milano, and was renamed to Junior five days later. It is intended as a direct replacement for the MiTo in the same B-segment and the Giulietta at the same time. The Junior is related to the Jeep Avenger and the Fiat 600, and is manufactured alongside them in Tychy, Poland, sharing the same STLA Small (e-CMP2) platform.

The Junior features a few design elements reference to the Giulia TZ, a scudetto shield front grille (Elettrica version will have the logo cut into it and Hybrid version has a traditional grille with 'Alfa Romeo' script), hidden rear door handles, "3+3" adaptive full LED matrix headlights and a black trim piece surrounding the taillights. The Junior is the first Alfa Romeo to ditch the traditional offset numberplate for a central mounted numberplate in response to new pedestrian safety regulations.

The interior has two 10.25 in (26.0 cm) screens for the instrument cluster and touchscreen infotainment system, air-con vents Quadrifoglio four-leaf clover shape, and optional Sabelt sports seats. Other features include the option of 360-degree parking sensors and 180-degree rear camera, Alfa D.N.A drive mode selection, 'Hey Alfa' virtual voice assistant and Level 2 autonomous driving safety features.

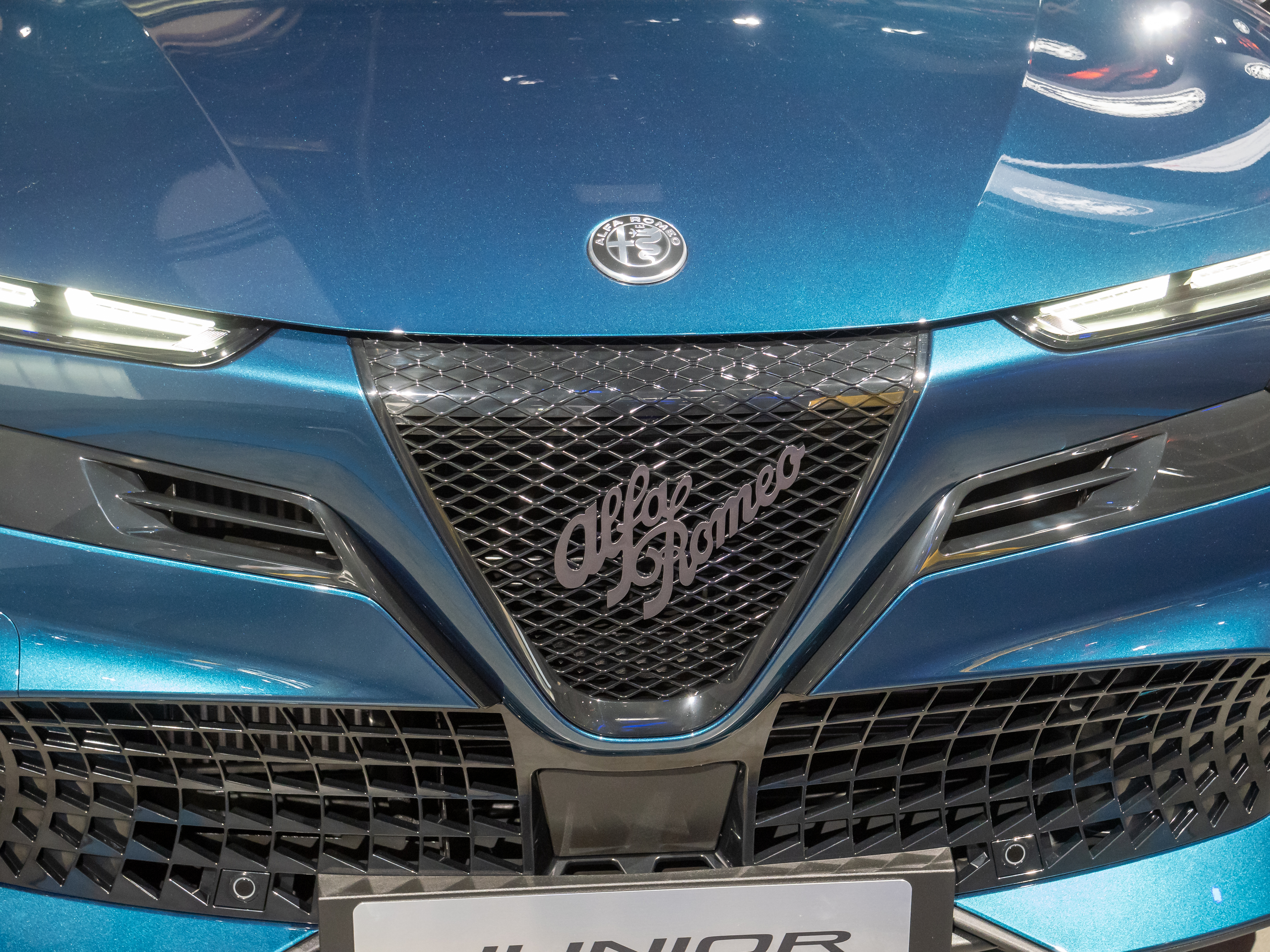
Optional heritage style Cuore Sportivo

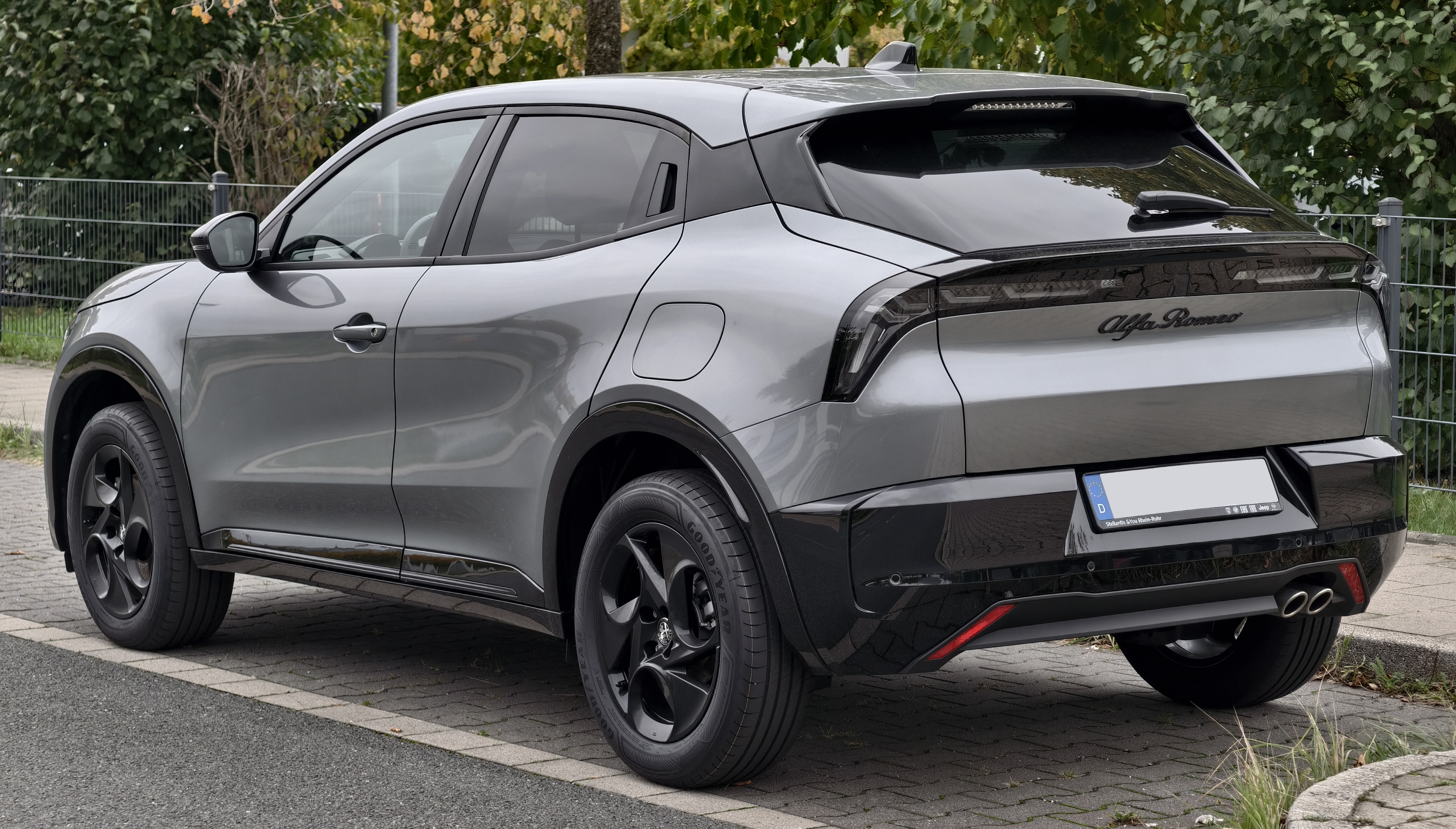
Alfa Romeo Junior Ibrida (Germany)

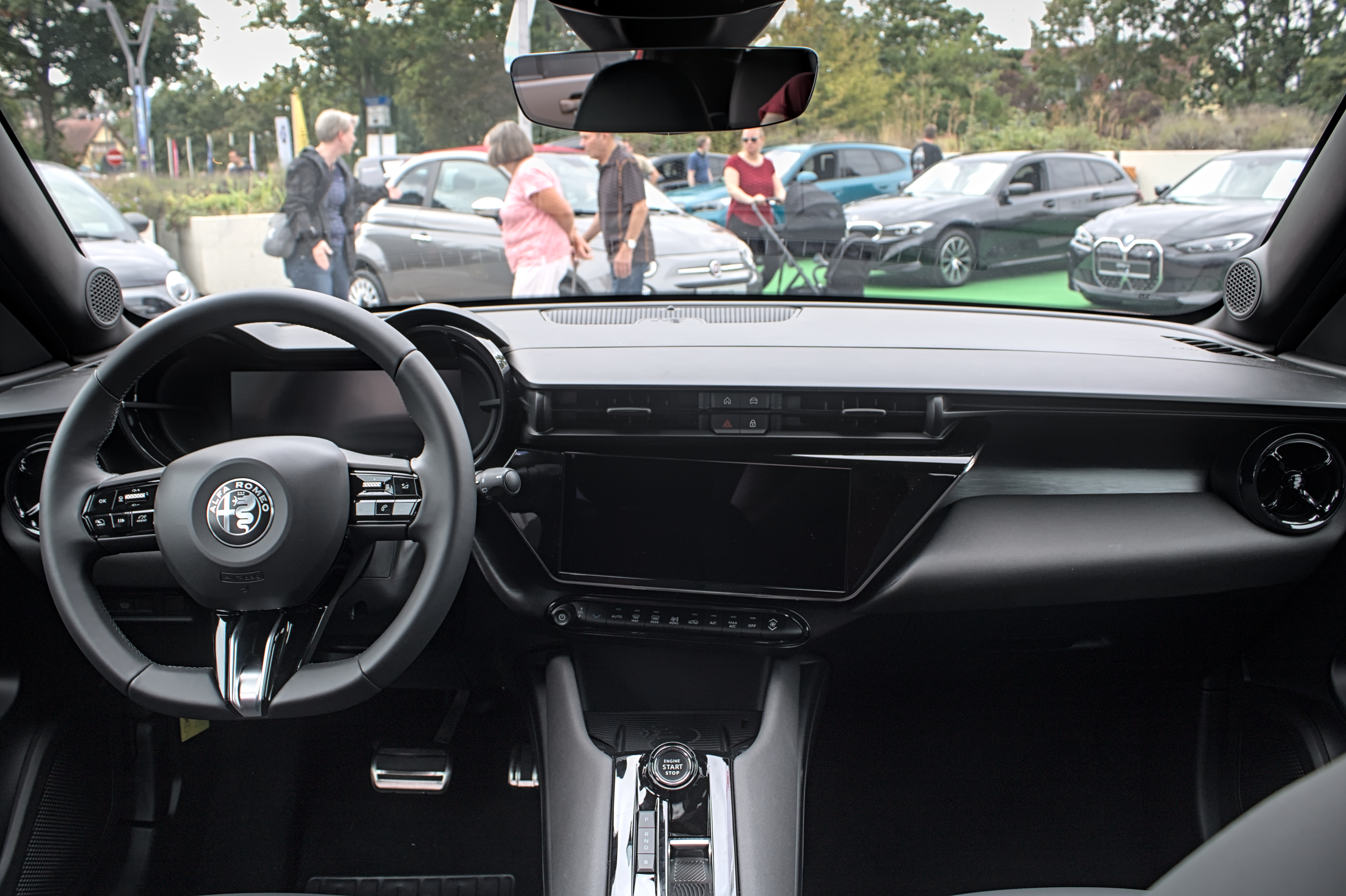
Interior

== Performance ==
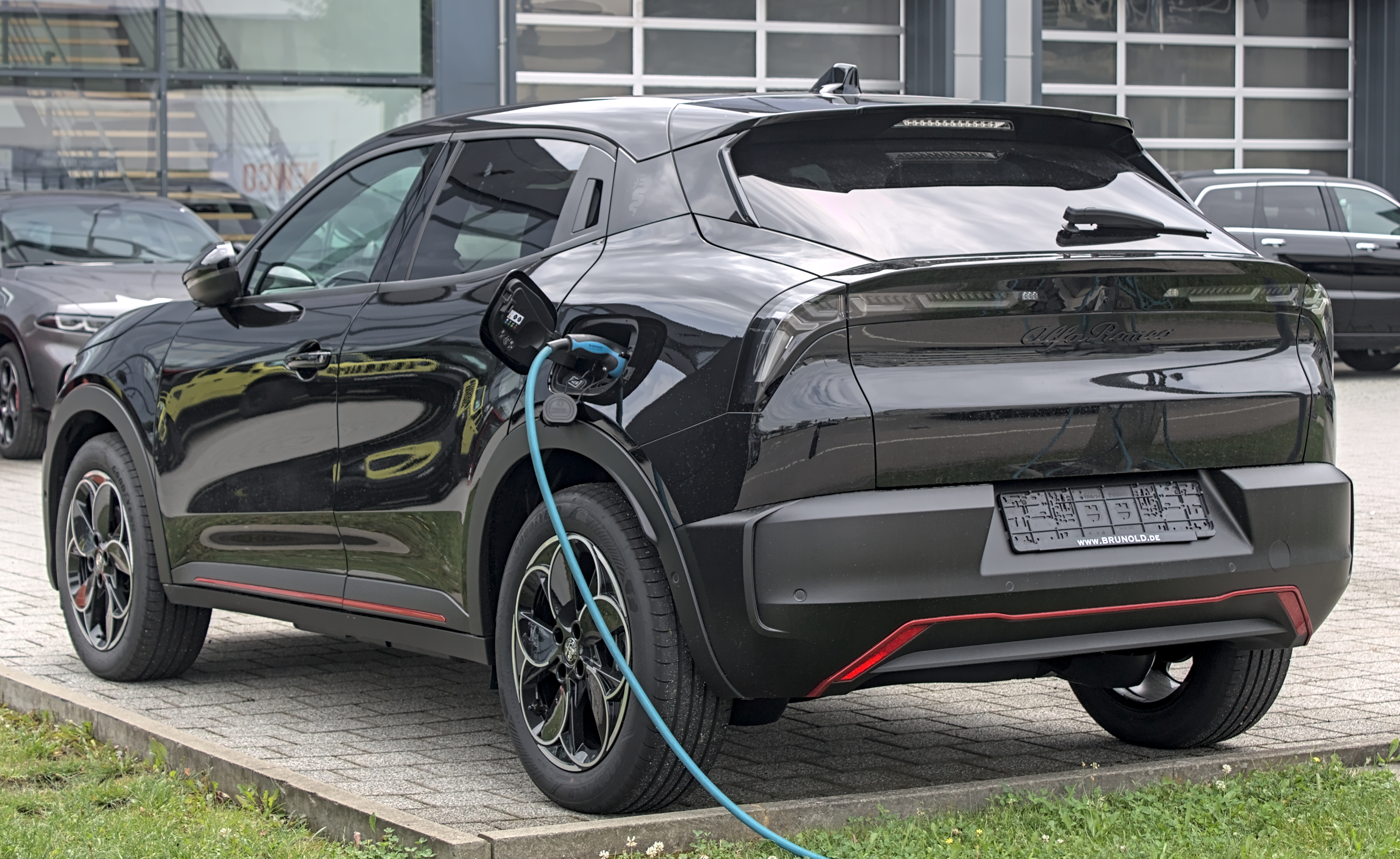
Alfa Romeo Junior Elettrica (Germany)

The Alfa Romeo Junior is the company's first all-electric vehicle, although it is also offered with a mild-hybrid petrol drivetrain.

The vehicle is offered with three performance levels, as well as the Ibrida, which serves as a mild-hybrid alternative to the fully electric drivetrain options. The first level is the Alfa Romeo Junior Elettrica, which makes 115 kW (154 bhp; 156 PS), and 260 N·m (192 ft·lb) of torque. It is front-wheel drive, and accelerates from 0 to 100 km/h (0–62 mph) in 9.0 seconds. Its 54 kWh battery pack allows the Elettrica 410 kilometres (250 mi) of range. The second performance trim, dubbed the Junior Speciale, shares many of the Elettrica's characteristics, with identical range and performance.

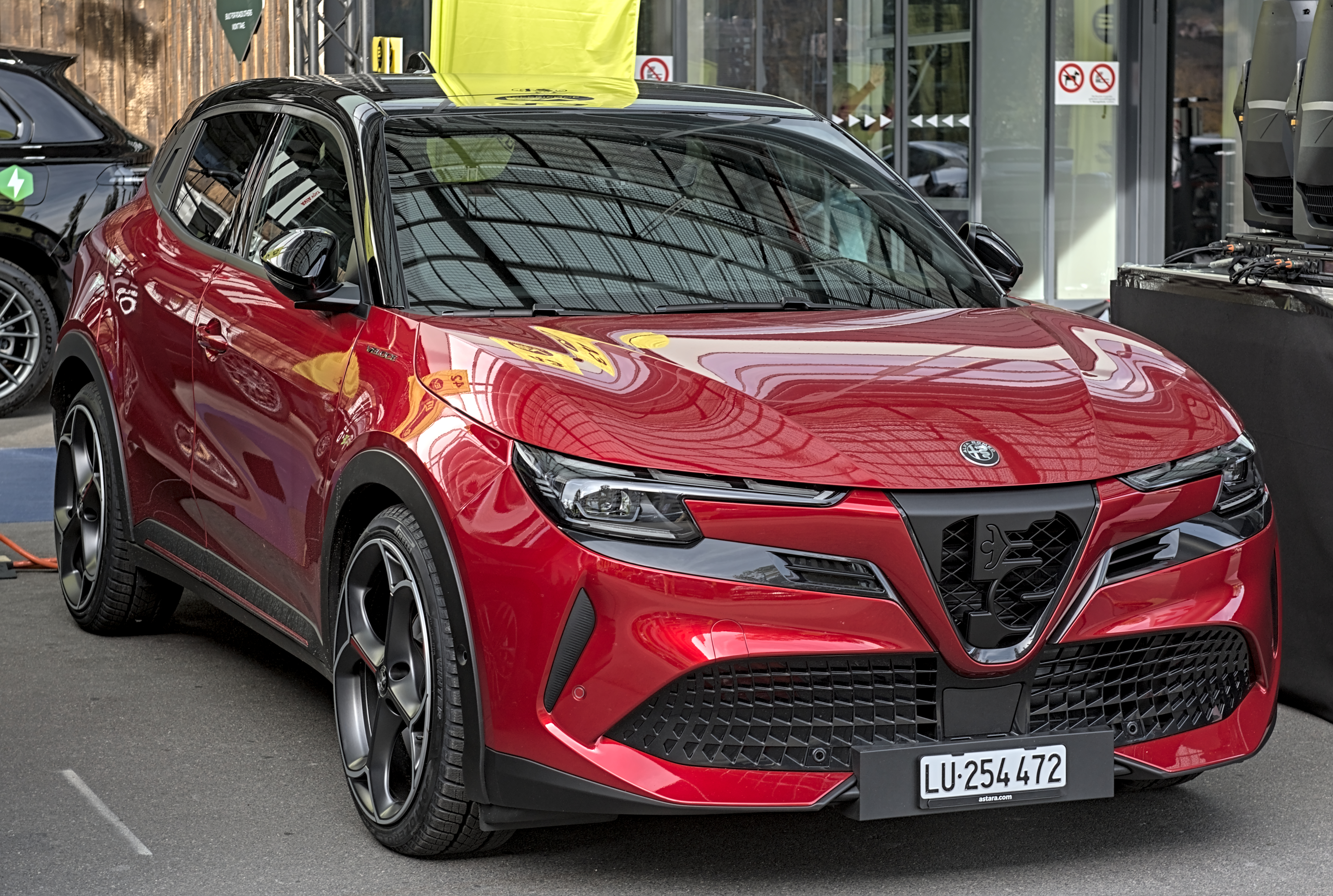
Alfa Romeo Junior Veloce (Switzerland)

The third and currently most powerful performance level has been dubbed the Junior Veloce, which makes 207 kW (278 bhp; 281 PS), and 345 N·m (254 ft·lb) of torque, allowing a 0–100 km/h (0–62 mph) time of 5.9 seconds. Similarly to the less powerful performance levels, however, it is front-wheel drive, and utilizes the same 54 kWh battery pack, allowing it 347 kilometres (216 mi) of range.

The fourth spec, dubbed the Ibrida, utilizes a 48-volt mild-hybrid system, making a total of 102 kW (136 bhp; 138 PS). The battery, which contributes 21 kW (29 bhp; 29 PS), works with a 1.2 L turbocharged I3 engine linked to a six-speed dual-clutch transmission, although further information is yet to be revealed.
