= Ammon (disambiguation) =

Ammon was an ancient Canaanite nation.

Ammon may also refer to:

== Ancient world ==
- The Egyptian god Amun of the same name, also sometimes spelled Ammon
  - Horns of Ammon, curling ram horns used as a symbol of the Egyptian deity Ammon (Amun or Amon)
  - Zeus Ammon, the Greek interpretation of the Egyptian god Amun

== People ==
=== Mononym ===
- Ammon, bishop of Elearchia (fl. 4th–5th century)
- Ammon, bishop of Hadrianopolis (fl. 400AD)
- Ammon (geometer) (fl. 3rd century), ancient Roman mathematician
- Saint Amun (fl. 4th century), a Christian saint also known as Ammon
- Ammon, son of Lot (Bible)

=== Book of Mormon ===
- Ammon (Book of Mormon explorer), descendant of Zarahemla in the Book of Mormon
- Ammon (Book of Mormon missionary), son of Mosiah II in the Book of Mormon

=== Surname ===
- Ammon (surname)

=== Given name ===
- Ammon Brown (1798–1882), American politician
- Ammon Bundy (born 1975), American militant and activist
- Ammon Hennacy (1893–1970), an American pacifist
- Ammon Matuauto (born 1986), New Zealand rugby player
- Ammon McNeely (1970–2023), American rock climber
- Ammon Shea, American writer
- Ammon M. Tenney (1844–1925), American missionary and colonizer
- Ammon Wrigley (1861–1946), English poet

== Places ==
- Ammon, New Brunswick, a community in Canada
- Ammon, Idaho, a city in the US
- Ammon, North Carolina, an unincorporated community in the US
- Ammon, Virginia, an unincorporated community in the US
- Ammon Ford, North Carolina, an unincorporated community in the US

== Fictional characters ==
- Ammon, a character in the 1981 film Clash of the Titans and its 2010 remake
- Ammon Bast, a character from the video game Criminal Case

== Other uses ==
- Ammon News, Jordanian news agency

== See also ==
- Ammonia, a colorless gas whose name originates from the Egyptian god Amun.
- Ammonium, a chemical compound whose name derives from the Egyptian god Amun
- Ammonite (disambiguation)
- Amorites, a Canaanean people often confused with Ammonites
- Amon (disambiguation)
- Amun (disambiguation)
- Amman (disambiguation)
