= Amon (surname) =

Amon is a surname, and may refer to

- Alexandra Amon (born 1981), French-Ivorian actress and film producer
- Angelika Amon (1967–2020), Austrian-American molecular biologist
- Artur Amon (1916–1944), Estonian basketball player
- Carol Amon (born 1946), American judge
- Chris Amon (1943–2016), New Zealand motor racing driver
- Cristiano Amon (born 1970), Brazilian-American manager
- Cristina Amon, Uruguayan-born American scientist and academic
- Diva Amon, Trinidadian marine biologist
- François-Joseph Amon d'Aby (1913–2007), playwright and essayist in the Côte d'Ivoire
- Franz Amon, Austrian violinist
- Ines Amon (born 1992), Slovenian handball player
- Johann Andreas Amon (1763–1825), German composer
- Johanne Morissette Daug Amon, stage name Morissette (singer) (born 1996), Filipina singer-songwriter
- Jonathan Amon (born 1999), American soccer player
- Joseph Amon (born 1969), American epidemiologist and human rights activist
- Karl Amon (born 1995), Australian rules football player
- Lambert Amon Tanoh (1926–2022), Ivorian politician and diplomat
- Marcel Amon-Tanoh (born 1951), Ivorian politician
- Nissim Amon (born 1963), Israeli meditation teacher
- Rory Amon (born 1990/1), Australian politician and convicted criminal

== See also ==
- Ammon (surname)
