= Amun (disambiguation) =

Amun (Amun-Ra, Amon, Ammon, Amen, Amoun, or Hammon) is an Egyptian god.

Amun may also refer to:

== People ==
- Saint Amun, 4th-century Christian ascetic and founder of a monastic community in Egypt
- Amun Abdullahi (born 1974), Somali-Swedish journalist and founder of a girls' school in Mogadishu, Somalia
- Amun Starr (born 1984), American musical artist
- Fanny Amun (born 1962), Nigerian football player

== Fictional characters ==
- Amun, an occasional character in Marvel comic books featuring superhero Anya Corazon (Araña / Spider-Girl)
- Amun, a character in the film series The Twilight Saga

== Other uses ==
- Amun-Re (board game), a 2003 board game
- 3554 Amun, a near-Earth asteroid
- Rasm Amun, a village in Syria
- Temple of Amun, Jebel Barkal, an archeological site in Sudan

== See also ==
- Amon (disambiguation)
- Ammon (disambiguation)
- Amoun, another name of the ascetic Ammonas
- Aman (disambiguation)
