= The Fireborne Blade =

2024 fantasy novella by Charlotte Bond

- Author: Charlotte Bond
- Language: English
- Genre: Fantasy
- Published: 28 May 2024
- Publisher: Tordotcom
- Pages: 167 (hardcover)
- ISBN: 9781250290311
- Followed by: The Bloodless Princes

The Fireborne Blade is a 2024 fantasy novella by Charlotte Bond. The story features Maddileh, a disgraced knight who enters a dragon's lair to retrieve a magical sword. It was followed by a sequel, The Bloodless Princes, also published in 2024.

== Plot ==
The story alternates between the main plot and excerpts from a fictional text entitled The Demise and Desmense of Dragons. The latter recounts encounters between knights and dragons, serving as exposition for the main plot. In the world of the novella, dragons are dangerous magical creatures. Their lairs are haunted by the ghosts of those they have killed, and their magical auras can confuse those who approach them.

Maddileh is a knight, one of only a few women to achieve the title. She punches a suitor and is exiled from court. She seeks the Fireborne Blade, guarded by a dragon known as the White Lady, to repair her reputation. A prophecy states that no living man will kill the White Lady; Maddileh believes that she will be able to do so because she is a woman.

Maddileh and her squire Petros enter the dragon's layer, though her memory of arriving is hazy. Petros reveals that he is not truly a squire; he is a mage who agreed to go with Maddileh in order to rescue his sister Saralene. Saralene is an apprentice mage who was captured by the White Lady. Maddileh has previously met Saralene, having rescued her from kidnappers. Maddileh and Petros encounter ghosts and other horrors as they descend to the lair's central chamber. Maddileh slays the dragon and retrieves the Fireborne Blade.

It is revealed that Petros set up Saralene's capture. He hoped that exposure to the dragon would increase Saralene's magical abilities, then planned to use her power to extend the life of his superior, the High Mage. Petros cuts Saralene's throat, catching her blood in an enchanted bowl. He reveals that Maddileh is a ghost and was killed by the dragon months ago; she interpreted the prophecy to state that she could kill the White Lady because she was a woman. In reality, it was because she was already dead. Petros takes the Blade and leaves the ghosts of Maddileh and Saralene in the dragon's lair.

The High Mage drinks from the enchanted bowl, which Saralene had booby-trapped with phoenix feathers. The High Mage dies and Saralene is reborn from his body, becoming the new High Mage. Saralene force-feeds the remaining potion to Petros, killing him and resurrecting Maddileh in his place.

In an epilogue, the White Lady is shown to have survived her encounter with Maddileh.

== Reception ==
Marlene Harris of Library Journal wrote that Bond "takes the classic knight vs. dragon tale, gender-bends it a la Nicola Griffith’s Spear, gives it a bit of a sapphic twist, and then turns it into a ghost story with betrayals and body-swapping until the winners become the losers and the righteous win the day." Harris concludes that the novella is "recommended for readers who love to see a familiar tale turned on its head." Adrian Collins of Grimdark Magazine praised the magical nature of the dragons, particularly the way in which the excerpts are incorporated into the narrative. The review concludes by calling the work "one of the best dragon dark fantasies I’ve read in ages."

Writing for Locus Magazine, Liz Bourke wrote that the novella is "not deep, and its thematic argument about the evils of patriarchy is embroidering over a well-worn theme." However, Bourke praised the "entertaining story" and "vividly inventive dragon-related-worldbuilding", concluding that "I could definitely stand to read a few more earnest adventures in this vein."

Publishers Weekly called the novella "a strong concept that falters in execution." The review praised the "explosive final twist" but felt that it did not do enough to "make up for the half-baked magic system and rushed plotting".
