= Amon =

Amon may refer to:

== Mythology ==
- Amun, an Ancient Egyptian deity, also known as Amon and Amon-Ra
- Aamon, a Goetic demon

== People ==
=== Mononym ===
- Amon of Judah (c. 664–c. 640 BC), king of Judah
- Amon of Toul (c. 375–c. 423 AD), second recorded Bishop of Toul

=== Given name ===
- Amon Olive Assemon (born 1987), Ivorian handball player
- Amon Bazira (1944–1993), Pan-Africanist leader and organizer
- Amon Buchanan (born 1982), Australian rules football player
- Amon G. Carter (1879–1955), American publisher and art collector
- Amon Göth (1908–1946), Austrian concentration camp commandant in the Nazi SS during World War II
- Amon Gordon (born 1981), American football player
- Amon B. King (1807–1836), American military leader
- Amon Kemboi (born 1995), Kenyan long-distance runner
- Amon Kotei (1915–2011), Ghanaian sculptor and artist
- Amon Kotey, Ghanaian boxer
- Amon Liner (1940–1976), American poet and playwright
- Amon Miyamoto (born 1958), Japanese director
- Amon Murwira, Zimbabwean politician
- Amon Ashaba Mwiine (born 1981), Ugandan gender activist
- Amon N'Douffou V, King of Sanwi in Ivory Coast
- Amon Neequaye (born 1963), Ghanaian boxer
- Amon Nikoi (1930–2002), Ghanaian economist and diplomat
- Amon Saba Saakana (formerly Sebastian Clarke), British-Trinidadian writer, broadcaster and publisher
- Amon Simutowe (born 1982), Zambian chess player
- Amon-Ra St. Brown (born 1999), American football wide receiver
- Amon Tobin (born 1972), Brazilian IDM producer
- Amon Ritter von Gregurich (1867–1915), Hungarian fencer
- Amon Wilds (1762–1833), English architect and builder
- Amon Henry Wilds (1784 or 1790–1857), English architect
- Monsieur Amon (1849–1915), French coffee and real estate entrepreneur

=== Surname ===
- Amon (surname)

== Arts, entertainment, and media ==
=== Music ===
- Amon, original name of the band Deicide
  - Amon: Feasting the Beast, compilation album by the band Deicide
- Amon, the house in the storyline of the King Diamond album Them
- Amon Amarth, Swedish melodic death metal band
- Amon Düül II, German rock band

=== Television and film ===
- Amon Saga, a 1986 anime film
- Hanna Amon, a 1951 German film

== Fictional characters and places ==
- Amon (Dungeons & Dragons)
- Amon (The Legend of Korra)
- Amon (StarCraft)
- Amon (Witch Hunter Robin), in the Witch Hunter Robin anime
- Amon, a character in the anime Amon Saga
- Amon, an Arab villian in Armour of God II: Operation Condor
- Amon, in Devilman and Devilman Crybaby
- Amon, a non-playable character in the Lufia videogames; see Lufia & the Fortress of Doom § Non-playable characters
- Amon, in the manga and anime series Magi: The Labyrinth of Magic
- Amon, in the game series Megami Tensei; see Shin Megami Tensei If...
- Amon, in the game Shadow Hearts: Covenant
- Amon Ad Raza, in Warmachine
- Amon Amarth, another name for Mount Doom which means "Mountain of Fate"
- Amon County, Ohio, the location of a cult in Netflix Series Devil in Ohio.
- Amon Garam, the Japanese name of Adrian Gecko, in the anime series Yu-Gi-Oh! GX
- Amon Koutarou, a character in the Tokyo Ghoul manga series
- Amon Sur, an alien supervillain from DC Universe.
- Amon Tomaz, an alternate name of Osiris, in the DC Comics universe
- Amon, the Angel of Time, the primary antagonist of the Chinese webnovel Lord of Mysteries

== Other uses ==
- Amon (Formula One team), also known as Chris Amon Racing
- Amon Creek, a river in Washington, USA
- Amon: The Darkside of the Devilman, a horror manga

== See also ==
- Aman (disambiguation)
- Amun (disambiguation)
- Amman (disambiguation)
- Ammann (disambiguation)
- Ammon (disambiguation)
