= Von Ammon =

Von Ammon is a surname, and may refer to:

- Christoph Friedrich von Ammon (1766–1850), German theological writer and preacher
- Friedrich August von Ammon (1799–1861), German surgeon and ophthalmologist
- Wilhelm von Ammon (1903–1992), German lawyer and war criminal

== See also ==
- Ammon (surname)
