= Krehl =

Krehl is a German surname and the name means fragile – a participle from Czech word křehnout.

== Variants ==
Language	Name
Czech	Křehl
German	Krehl

== People ==
- Christoph Krehl (1825–1909), German orientalist
  - Ludolf von Krehl (1861–1937), German internist and physiologist, son of Christoph Krehl
- Constanze Krehl (born 1956), German politician
- Stephan Krehl (1864–1924), German composer, teacher, and theoretician
