= Ammonite (disambiguation) =

Ammonites are either an extinct group of marine animals, or a former ancient people from the area of today's Jordan:

- Ammonites or Ammonoidea, a subclass
  - Ammonitida, an order
    - Ammonitina, a suborder

and

- Ammonites (people), a nation of the ancient Levant, mentioned in the Bible
  - Ammonite language, language of the Ammonites

Ammonite may also refer to:

== Art and entertainment ==
- Ammonite (film), a 2020 film
- Ammonite order, an architectural order featuring ammonite-shaped capitals
- Ammonite (novel), a 1992 novel by Nicola Griffith
- Ammonite (album), an album by the Japanese rock group Plastic Tree

== Other uses ==
- Ammonite (explosive), a form of amatol
- Anti-Nephi-Lehies, also known as Ammonites, a fictitious people from the Book of Mormon
- 2023 KQ14, nicknamed Ammonite, a trans-Neptunian object in the Solar System

== See also ==
- Amniote, a group of vertebrate organisms
- Amun (also Ammon), the ancient Egyptian god after whom the animals are named
- Ammon (disambiguation)
