= Menewood =

2023 historical fiction novel

- Cover of the first edition of Menewood
- Author: Nicola Griffith
- Cover artist: Anna Balbusso and Elena Balbusso
- Language: English
- Series: The Hild Sequence
- Genre: Historical fiction
- Publisher: Macmillan
- Publication place: United States
- Pages: 720
- ISBN: 9780374715861
- OCLC: 1310767356
- Preceded by: Hild

Menewood is a 2023 historical novel by Nicola Griffith and the second installment in The Hild Sequence, which tells a fictionalized version of the life of Hilda of Whitby, a saint, abbess, and major figure in Anglo-Saxon England. In contrast to Hild, the first novel in the series, Menewood only covers four years of Hild's life. It also includes supplementary material such as a family tree, glossary, and maps.

The novel was first published on October 3, 2023 in the United States and on November 21, 2023 in the United Kingdom. An unabridged audiobook version narrated by Pearl Hewitt was also released.

== Plot ==
Menewood begins in 632 CE, four months after the events of Hild. Hild, who is eighteen years old at the beginning of the novel and twenty-one by the end, must navigate political turmoil as an advisor of the newly-Christian Edwin of Northumbria. As lady of Elmet in the Menewood valley, Hild establishes a self-sustaining community where property is owned communally.

Much of the plot centers around two battles: the Battle of Hatfield Chase and the Battle of Heavenfield. Griffith imagined Hild's role in the Battle of Heavenfield, in part, to explain Oswald of Bernicia's unlikely victory over Cadwallon ap Cadfan, whose forces vastly outnumbered Oswald's.

== Development and genre ==
Griffith has spent over twenty years researching seventh-century Britain while writing The Hild Sequence and maintains a blog dedicated to her historical research. She began drafting Menewood in 2014, but the novel took longer than expected for a variety of reasons, including her PhD program and multiple sclerosis. She originally intended for Menewood to cover approximately fifteen years of Hild's life, but struggled with this scope. Writing her 2022 novella Spear helped Griffith to reenvision Menewood.

The inspiration for Hild's community in the Menewood valley came from a park in Meanwood, Leeds which Griffith loved as a child. She has said that being a wheelchair user has caused her to slow down and appreciate the world around her, which helped her write Hild as an exceptionally observant character and weave in small details about the natural world. Griffith created an elite band of disabled warriors in Hild's retinue because she wanted to see "[herself] and other traditionally marginalized people... represented in a heroic past we’ve been told doesn’t belong to us."

According to Griffith, it is difficult to categorize Menewood for the purposes of award nominations, because it can be considered historical fiction, speculative fiction, literary fiction, disability fiction, queer and lesbian fiction, and a secret history. She considers both Hild and Menewood to fall under the umbrella of SFF (science fiction and fantasy) because "they use the narrative tools of science fiction, read like fantasy, and require the kind of reading skills honed by years of reading SFF." In a piece published in Reactor about how to categorize Hild, she wrote that she considers all historical fiction to be a form of speculative fiction or fantasy.

== Reception ==
Critical reception was largely positive, with many praising Griffith's attention to historical detail and lyrical prose. In a review for The New York Times, Amal El-Mohtar described the novel as a "masterpiece of immersion." Gary K. Wolfe wrote in Locus that Menewood is "the major work so far of a major talent" and called attention to its "density of detail, political complexity, and brilliance of characterization." Kirkus Reviews was more mixed, describing the novel as "overlong and slow-paced, but compelling despite its flaws."

Menewood was named one of the best books of 2023 by Vox and one of the best queer books of the year by Autostraddle due to Griffith's portrayal of Hild as a bisexual woman.

== Sequels ==
Griffith plans to continue the Hild Sequence with a third book about Hild's journey to joining the Church and a fourth book about her religious life.
