= So Lucky (novel) =

2018 autobiographical novel by Nicola Griffith

So Lucky: A Novel
- Author: Nicola Griffith
- Language: English
- Genre: Science fiction novel
- Publisher: MCD x FSG Originals
- Publication date: May 15, 2018
- Publication place: United States
- Media type: Print (Paperback, Hardcover); Audiobook
- Pages: 192
- ISBN: 9780374265922

So Lucky: A Novel is an autobiographical novel by Nicola Griffith, published May 15, 2018 by MCD x FSG Originals. The book follows Mara Tagarelli as she is diagnosed with multiple sclerosis (MS) and must step down from her role as director for a multi-million AIDS organization. All the while, a serial killer is targeting individuals with MS.

== Reception ==
A number of reviews focused on the book's representation of multiple sclerosis. June Sawyer, writing for Booklist, noted, "Griffith, who has herself been diagnosed with MS, presents a fresh and powerful novel and antidote to the sense of victimhood." Dana Hansen of the Chicago Review of Books echoed the sentiment, stating, "Far too little fiction reflects the experiences and realities of those with disabilities, and when it does, it often reads as an exercise in tokenism. In So Lucky, a disconcerting but very necessary book, Griffith presents a protagonist with substance, complexity, and purpose. Mara is so much more than her diagnosis and limitations, but her story underlines the insidiousness of ableism and the lamentable mistreatment and neglect of the chronically ill and disabled among us." Lambda Literary Foundation's Anne Charles wrote, "The world of Nicola Griffith’s So Lucky is governed by ableist misconception and ignorance, but it is also marked by hope and human connection ... It’s a narrative that at once informs, confronts, puzzles and engages. I have little doubt that readers who take it up will be rewarded." Publishers Weekly added, "Anyone who’s ever struggled with medical adversity will be inspired."

The New York Times's Amal El-Mohtar called the book "a compact, brutal story of losing power and creating community, fast-paced as a punch in the face." El-Mohtar continued, saying, the book was "beautifully written, with a flexible, efficient precision that embodies the protagonist’s voice and character."

Kirkus described So Lucky as "[a] narrative of disability and its consequences" and provided a poor review, stating the book was "[o]riginal but disappointing."

Autrostraddle named So Lucky one of the best LGBT Books of 2018, and The Boston Globe named it one of the best novels of the year.

Awards and honors for So Lucky
Year	Award/Honor	Result	Ref.
2018	Over the Rainbow Booklist	Top 10	
2019	Washington State Book Award	Winner	
2019	Pacific Northwest Booksellers Association Award	Shortlist	
2019	Tournament of Books	Shortlist	
