= The Bloodless Princes =

2024 fantasy novella by Charlotte Bond

- Author: Charlotte Bond
- Language: English
- Genre: Fantasy
- Publisher: Tordotcom
- Publication date: 29 October 2024
- Pages: 160 (Hardcover)
- ISBN: 9781250290779
- Preceded by: The Fireborne Blade

The Bloodless Princes is a 2024 fantasy novella by Charlotte Bond. It is a sequel to The Fireborne Blade, also published in 2024, and continues the story of the characters from the previous book.

== Plot ==
The story is interspersed with myths and old stories. Certain tales are told from both human and dragon perspectives.

The main story begins three years after the events of The Fireborne Blade. Maddileh begins to have dreams of the White Lady and realizes that the dragon survived their initial confrontation. In Saralene's room, Maddileh sees Hosh, the previous High Mage who was killed by Saralene. Hosh has taken control of Saralene's body, but Saralene fights her off and returns to her own form.

The Perilous Bridge connects the land of the living to the Gravelands. The Bridge is guarded by a woman named Luciel, who casts corrupt souls into the abyss and leads the righteous across to safety. While Hosh controls her body, Saralene is sent to the Gravelands and meets Luciel. Over the following weeks, Hosh attempts to control Saralene multiple times.

In a dream, the White Lady tells Maddileh that she can break Saralene's curse. Together, Saralene and Maddileh awaken the dragon, whose true name is Mienylyth. Mienylyth suggests that when Hosh next takes over, she burns his body. Saralene will not be dead, but will be trapped in the Underworld with Luciel. Maddileh can then rescue her. In return for Mienlyth's assistance, humans must stop hunting dragons. Maddileh and Saralene agree.

An interlude recounts the myth of the Bloodless Princes. Long ago, the Allfather and Allmother held a contest to choose a ruler for the lands of the dead. Identical twin princes C’sava and Pravhan entered the contest. A jealous C’sava murdered his brother, slitting his throat. The gods then cut C’sava's throat as recompense. C’sava was installed as ruler of the Night City, where unworthy individuals reside. Pravhan became ruler of the Peaceful City, where good souls are sent after death.

Saralene learns that the two cities occupy the same physical space, shifting each dawn and dusk. She visits the Peaceful City, but finds it is not as utopian as the legend implies. Prince Pravhan has uncompromising ideas about justice, and even minor infractions are punished harshly. Meanwhile, Maddileh and Mienylyth travel through a cave into the Gravelands. To disguise herself, Mienylyth takes the form of a cat, albeit with horns and wings. The three reunite in the Gravelands. Realizing that Pravhan will not help them, they visit the Night City to seek C’sava's help.

In the Night City, the group meets the Dragon Smith, who forged Maddileh's Fireborne Blade. C’sava asks for the Blade, with which he intends to kill his brother and unite the two cities. The group asks for time to debate. The next morning, they are apprehended by Pravhan. He takes the Blade and has them thrown into a labyrinth.

Mienylyth escapes by flying up to the exit. Trapped and alone, Maddileh and Saralene confess their love for each other. Mienylyth returns to rescue the duo. Saralene triggers a sunstone, which allows night and day to exist simultaneously. C’sava appears and kills Pravhan with the Blade. C’sava then betrays the group by refusing to release them. The Blade can cut a hole in reality to allow passage to the land of the living, but only when wielded by Death's own hand. Maddileh cuts off C’sava's hand. Saralene then uses the severed hand to open their passage.

In the world of the living, Mienylyth flies away. Saralene and Maddileh plan their future together.

== Reception and awards ==
Marlene Harris of Library Journal called the novella "a gender-bent tale of knights and dragons" and compared it to the myth of Orpheus and Eurydice. Publishers Weekly called the book "far more successful" than its predecessor, stating that "Bond expertly expands the lore of her series and ties up the loose ends that frustrated in the first book."

Sarah Deeming of the British Fantasy Society praised the use of interludes as a narrative device, stating that they "play an integral part in the plot development". Deeming also praised the setting of the underworld and "highly recommended" the novella. Adrian Collins of Grimdark Magazine also praised the use of the interludes. Collins felt that the novella focused more on the romantic relationship between Maddileh and Saralene, which is "not really where my areas of interest in reading lay", while appreciating the character of Mienylyth. Despite this focus, Collins felt that the novella was a worthwhile read.
