= Stay (novel) =

2002 crime novel by Nicola Griffith

- First edition cover
- Author: Nicola Griffith
- Publisher: Nan A. Talese
- Publication date: April 16, 2002
- ISBN: 0-385-50300-8

Stay is a 2002 crime novel by British-American writer Nicola Griffith. It is a sequel to her 1998 novel The Blue Place, and continues the story of its protagonist, Aud Torvingen.

The book was a finalist for the Lambda Literary Award for Lesbian Fiction in 2003.

== Publication details ==
- Stay. Nan A. Talese. 2002. ISBN 1-4000-3230-X.
