= Ludolf von Krehl =

German internist and physiologist

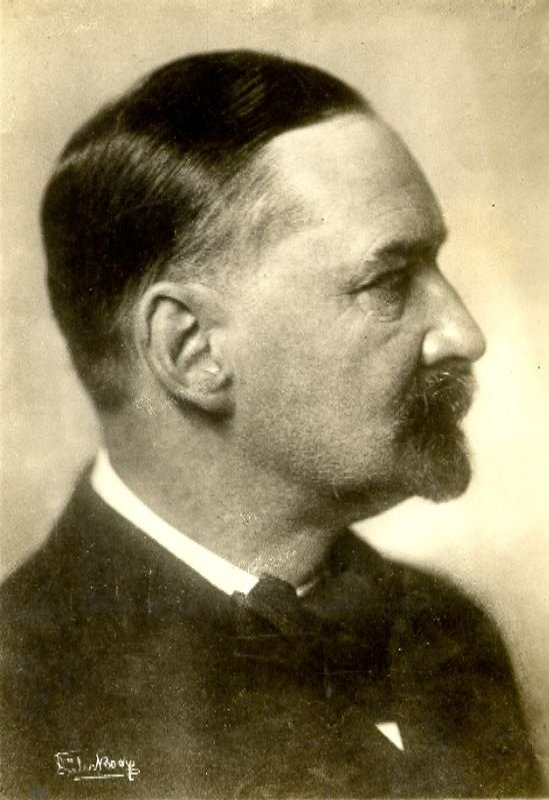
Ludolf von Krehl

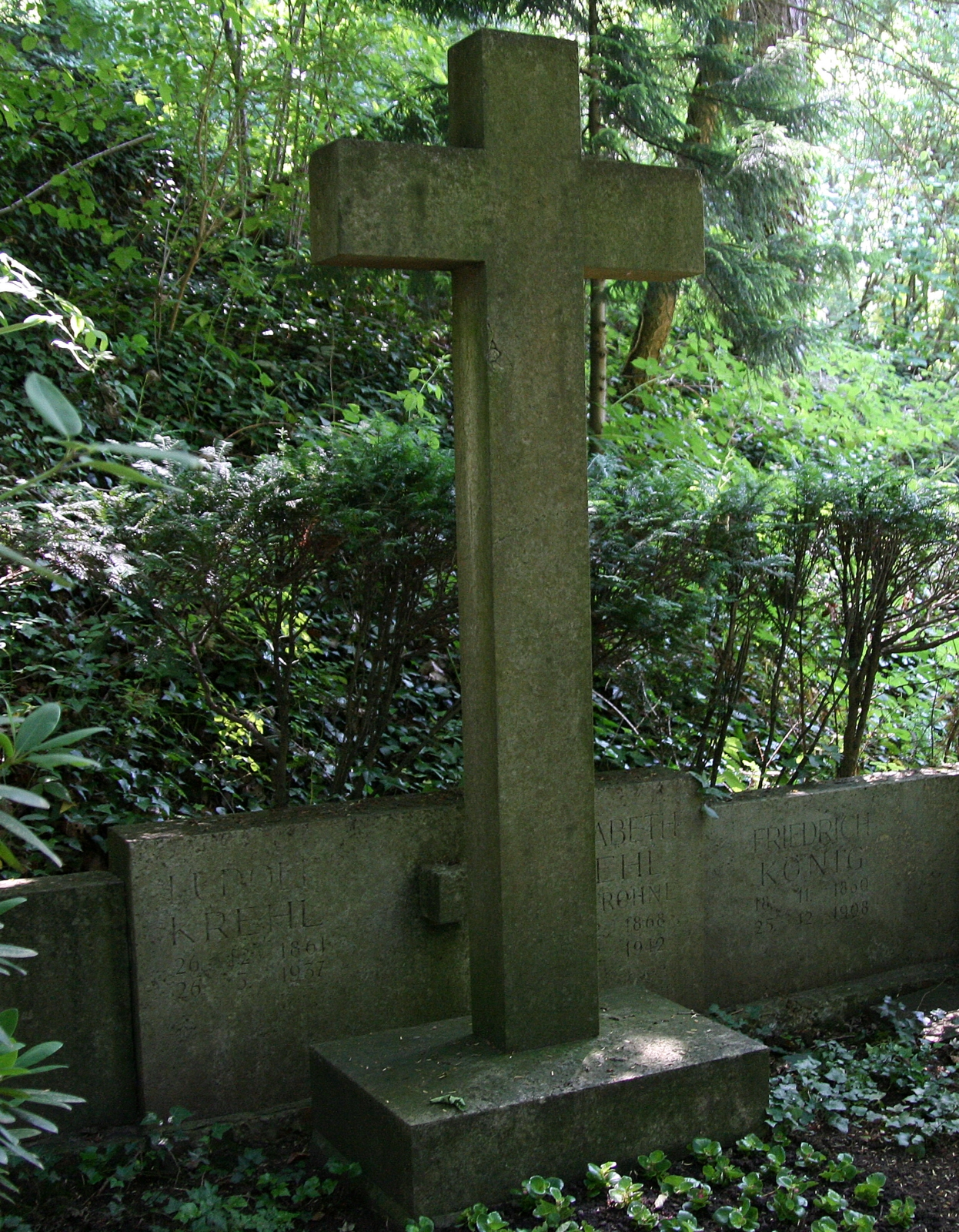
Krehl's grave in Heidelberg

Ludolf von Krehl (born Albrecht Ludolf Krehl, December 26, 1861 – May 26, 1937) was a German internist and physiologist who was a native of Leipzig. He was the son of Orientalist Christoph Krehl (1825–1901). His surname changed to "von Krehl" after his Ennoblement in 1904.

He studied at the Universities of Heidelberg and Leipzig, and later was an assistant to Ernst Leberecht Wagner (1829–1888) and Heinrich Curschmann (1846–1910) at the medical clinic in Leipzig. In 1888 he obtained his habilitation, becoming head of the medical clinic at Jena in 1892. In 1899 he became director of the clinic at the University of Marburg, and soon afterwards served as professor of special pathology and therapy of internal diseases in Greifswald (1900–02).

From 1902 to 1904 he was a professor at the University of Tübingen, and in 1904 he succeeded Bernhard Naunyn (1839–1925) at the University of Strasbourg. While at Strasbourg, he provided the necessary facilities to Albert Fraenkel (1864–1938) for the latter's testing of intravenous strophanthin. From 1907 until 1932 he was a professor and director of the medical clinic at the University of Heidelberg. One of his better known assistants at Heidelberg was Viktor von Weizsäcker (1886–1957).

Krehl made contributions in the field of cardiac pathology and in his research of metabolic diseases. Also, he admired the psychoanalytic work of Sigmund Freud and Josef Breuer, and had a keen interest in psychopathological aspects of disease from an individualized, psychosomatic standpoint.

Among his written works was a landmark textbook on pathological physiology that laid a scientific basis for clinical medicine. This textbook was first published in 1893 as Grundriß der allgemeinen klinischen Pathologie (Later known as Pathologische Physiologie), and eventually ran to fourteen editions. Krehl was a catalyst behind the founding of the "Kaiser Wilhelm Institute for Medical Research", which today is known as the Max Planck Institute for Medical Research in Heidelberg.

== Selected writings ==
- Grundriß der allgemeinen klinischen Pathologie, (Fundamentals of General Clinical Pathology), later known as Pathologische Physiologie (Pathological Physiology); Leipzig (1893)
- Die Erkrankungen des Herzmuskels, In: Carl Nothnagel's: Experimentelle Pathologie und Therapie, Bd. 15/1, Holder, Wien (1901)
- Krankheitsform und Persönlichkeit, Thieme, Leipzig (1929)
- Über die Naturheilkunde (1935)
