= Slow River =

1995 novel by Nicola Griffith

- Cover of first edition (hardcover)
- Author: Nicola Griffith
- Cover artist: Daniel Furon and Robert Olding
- Language: English
- Genre: Science fiction
- Publisher: Del Rey Books
- Publication date: 1995
- Publication place: United Kingdom
- Media type: Print (Hardcover & Paperback)
- Pages: 343
- ISBN: 0-345-39165-9
- OCLC: 32013101
- Dewey Decimal: 813/.54 20
- LC Class: PS3557.R48935 S58 1995

Slow River is a science fiction novel by British writer Nicola Griffith, first published in 1995. It won the Nebula Award for Best Novel and the Lambda Literary Award. The novel received critical praise for its writing and setting, while its use of multiple narrative modes was criticised.

== Summary ==
The novel features three narrative strands. The first in the internal chronology tells of Lore Van Oesterling, the scion of a rich and powerful family, being trained for a high-ranking position in its industry of genetically modified bacteria. Lore has to contend with her abusive family members at the same time. In the second, Lore is kidnapped, and her family refuses to ransom her. After an escape attempt, she turns to making a living from sex shows and scamming the wealthy, in the company of a woman, Spanner, who gives her shelter. In the final thread, Lore separates from Spanner and works in a sewage treatment plant, before eventually confronting her family.

== Reception ==
The novel was first published in 1995. It won the Nebula Award for Best Novel in 1997, and the Lambda Literary Award in 1996. Kirkus Reviews directed praise at Griffith's setting, writing that her "grim near-future" was convincing. Describing the book as an "explicitly lesbian drama", the review added that Griffith wrote with "skill and charm". Publishers Weekly was critical of the switches between first- and third-person narratives, noting that it was "refreshing at first", but led to increasing confusion: this criticism was echoed by Kirkus. Publishers Weekly added that the viewpoint switches were Griffith's "only miss-step", and that the novel was "exceptionally well-written". The Encyclopedia of Science Fiction wrote that the plot was "humane but at times contorted", and noted the depth in which Griffith explored her fictional near-future setting.

Scholar Pia Møller described the book as both a thriller and a romance, and noted that this may have led to it receiving less attention from critics, particularly as Griffith may have "compromised character development for suspense". Møller noted that the book's status as a lesbian romance, in particular, may have led to it being marginalised. She added that the story featured a "sophisticated depiction of environmental management", and praised Griffith for writing a book that made sociological themes accessible to a wide audience.
