= Ammon (surname) =

Ammon is a surname, and may refer to:

- Andrea Ammon (born 1958), German physician
- Blasius Ammon (1558–1590), Austrian friar and priest
- Charles Ammon, 1st Baron Ammon (1873–1960), British politician
- Edith Dennison Darlington Ammon (1862–1919), American photographer
- Elizabeth Ammon, British cricket journalist
- Francesca Russello Ammon, American academic
- Keith Ammon, American politician from New Hampshire
- Otto Ammon (1842–1916), German anthropologist
- Peter Ammon (born 1952), German diplomat
- Peter H. Ammon, American investor and endowment manager
- Ted Ammon (1949–2001), American businessman

== See also ==
- von Ammon
- Ammons
