= It Takes Two (short story) =

Science fiction story

"It Takes Two" is a science fiction short story by Nicola Griffith, about love and neurochemistry. It was first published in the anthology Eclipse Three, in 2009.

== Synopsis ==
After a businesswoman falls in love with a dancer, they discover that they were both participants in an experiment.

== Reception ==
"It Takes Two" was a finalist for the 2010 Hugo Award for Best Novelette.

The Wall Street Journal called it "neatly constructed, intellectually challenging and smoothly written", and described its theme as "(h)ow much control should our bosses have over us?"

At Strange Horizons, Abigail Nussbaum felt that the story was structurally flawed, but nonetheless "brilliant" for noting that if true love can be chemically induced, then it can also be commodified; Nussbaum further lauded Griffith for not concealing "the fact that Susanna [the dancer] has sold herself in the most profound way possible, and that Cody [the businesswoman] has bought her", concluding that the story is "simultaneously satisfying and horrifying" due to the "tension between romance and revulsion".
