= Christoph Friedrich von Ammon =

German theological writer and preacher

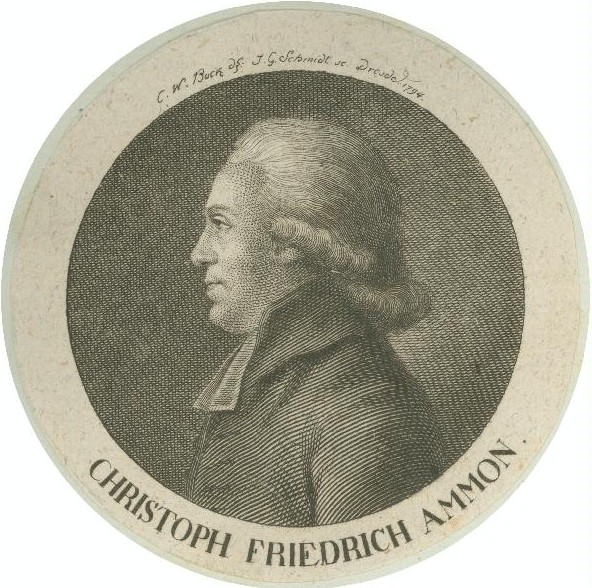

Christoph Friedrich von Ammon (January 16, 1766 – May 21, 1850) was a German theological writer and preacher. He was born at Bayreuth, Bavaria and died at Dresden.

== Life ==
Early life

Ammon was one of five children born to Philipp Michael Paul von Ammon and Eleonore Maria Eusebia Griesshammer. Ammon's father was a privy councillor attached to the Prussian court, while his mother came from a family of clergymen. Ammons paternal grandfather Johann Christoph Ammon was also a clergyman and theological writer who had successfully debated with Lorenz Christoph Mizler on whether there existed music in heaven.

Through a daughter of his younger brother Friedrich Daniel Jonathan he was the grand-uncle of the author August Engelhardt.

=== Education ===
Ammon was educated by private teachers. He was also taught by his relatives; like his maternal grandfather Christoph Heinrich Griesshammer whom he often visited and his father's brother Georg Conrad Lorenz Ammon who lived in Ansbach.

Ammon also received guidance from the Lutheran theologian Friedrich Immanuel Schwarz. His teachers encouraged him and instilled a love for languages and sciences. Additionally he read Homer, studied the Hebrew language, learned to act out the prose and metrical writings of the Old Testament and was therefore immediately placed in the top class of the Gymnasium in Bayreuth on January 19, 1783.

=== Career ===
After completing his studies at Erlangen, he held various professorships in the philosophical and theological faculties of Erlangen and Göttingen, succeeded Franz Volkmar Reinhard (1753–1812) in 1813 as court preacher and member of the Upper Consistory of the Church of Saxony at Dresden .

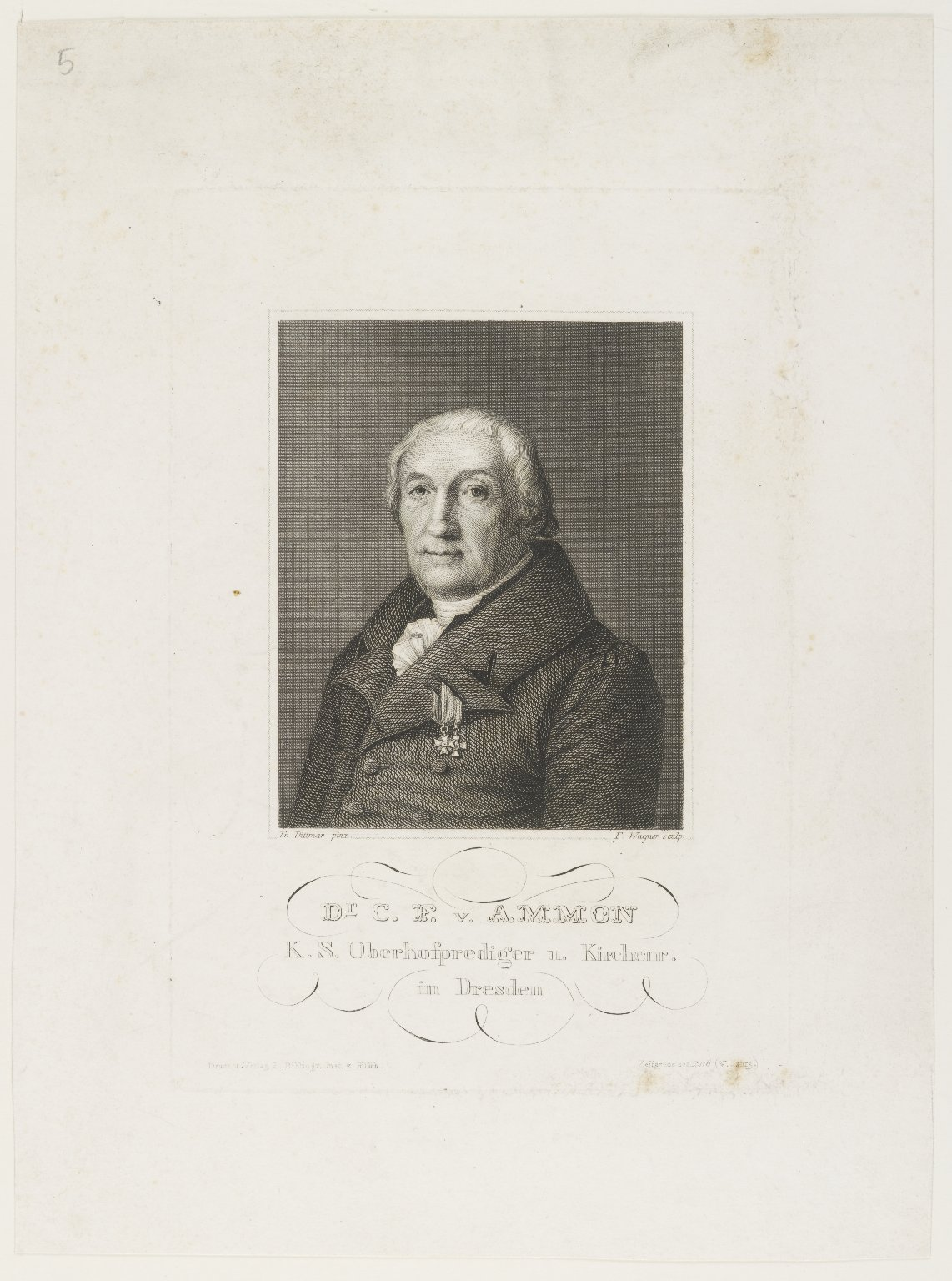
Christoph Friedrich von Ammon

Seeking to establish for himself a middle position between rationalism and supernaturalism, he declared for a "rational supernaturalism," and contended that there must be a gradual development of Christian doctrine corresponding to the advance of knowledge and science. But at the same time he sought, like other representatives of this school of thought, such as Karl Bretschneider and Julius Wegscheider, to keep in close touch with the historical theology of the Protestant churches. The term Offenbarungsrationalismus ("epiphanic rationalism") has been used to express Ammon's intermediate views.

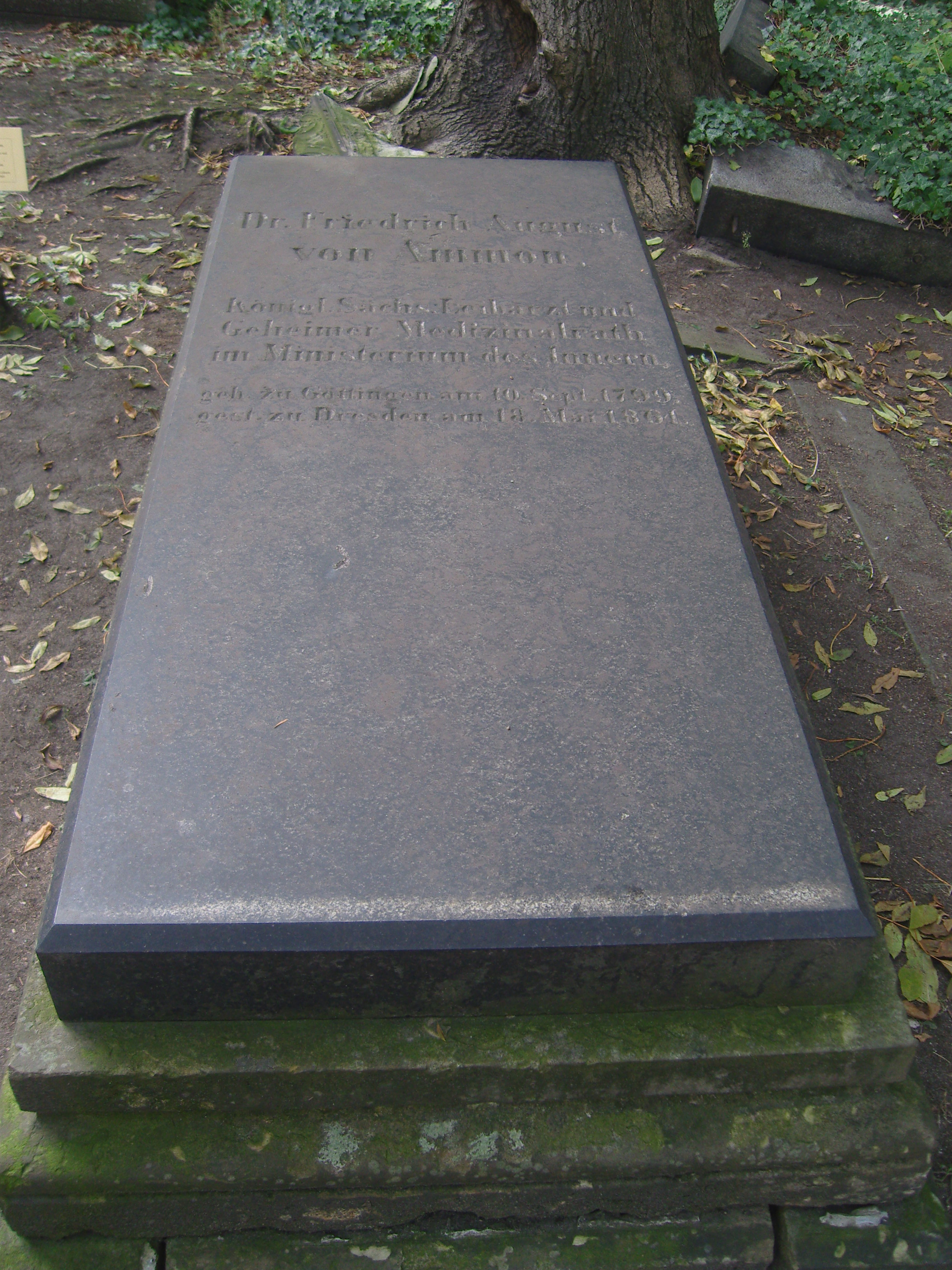
Grave of Christoph Friedrich von Ammon at the Eliasfriedhof in Dresden

He was a philologist and philosopher as well as a theologian, and a very voluminous author. His principal theological work was the "Fortbildung des Christenthums zur Weltreligion", in 4 volumes (Leipzig, 1833–1840); "Entwurf einer reinen biblischen Theologie" appeared in 1792 (2nd edition, 1801), "Summa Theologiae Christianas" in 1803 (other editions, 1808, 1816, 1830); "Das Geschichte des Lebens Jesu" in 1842, and "Die wahre und falsche Orthodoxie" in 1849.

Von Ammon's style in preaching was terse and lively, and some of his discourses are regarded as models of pulpit treatment of political questions.

== Marriage ==
In 1790 July 31, at Erlangen he married Elisabetha Breyer, daughter of clergyman and philosopher Johann Friedrich Breyer. One year after his marriage he became brother-in-law to Wilhelm Friedrich Hufnagel, who married Elisabethas younger sister Karoline. Hufnagel was a supporter of theistic rationalism and had previously been Ammons teacher.

This was not only the important family connection gained through the marriage; Ammons father-in-law was also the cousin of the father of Hegel and had served as the godfather at his baptism. Therefore, though the relation was somewhat distant Hegel corresponded with von Ammon and is also known to have visited von Ammon in Dresden.

The couplehad two sons and three daughters;

- Wilhelm Friedrich Philipp (b. 1792- d.1856) Married Mathilde Wilhelmine Klingspohr and had issue.
- Wilhelmine Friederike Luise (b. 1793- d.1873) Married to August Ludwig Gottlob Krehl and mother to Ludolf Krehl
- Dorothea Sabine
- Leonore Friederike Karoline
- Friedrich August Married Natalie Redlich and had issue.
- Wilhelm Karl Tobias

After her death von Ammon married Marianne Becker on 9 June 1823. She was the daughter the court councillor and former inspector of the Cabinet of Antiquities Dr. Becker. This marriage was without issue.

== Later life ==
In 1846 his granddaughter Anna (the daughter of his son Friedrich August) gave birth to her second son. The then aged eighty-year-old von Ammon baptized the child who was named Max Lothar von Hausen.

In 1849 he retired from his position as court preacher.

== Death ==
He died at Dresden.
