= Rasm Amun =

Rasm Amun رسم أمون
- Village
- Location in Syria
- Coordinates: 35°13′19″N 37°28′14″E
- Country: Syria
- Governorate: Hama
- District: Salamiyah District
- Subdistrict: Al-Saan Subdistrict

Population (2004)
  - Total: 430
- Time zone: UTC+3 (AST)
- City Qrya Pcode: C3285

Rasm Amun (Arabic: رسم أمون) is a Syrian village located in Al-Saan Subdistrict in Salamiyah District, Hama. According to the Syria Central Bureau of Statistics (CBS), Rasm Amun had a population of 430 in the 2004 census.
