= Nissim Amon =

Israeli meditation teacher (born 1963)

- ניסים אמון
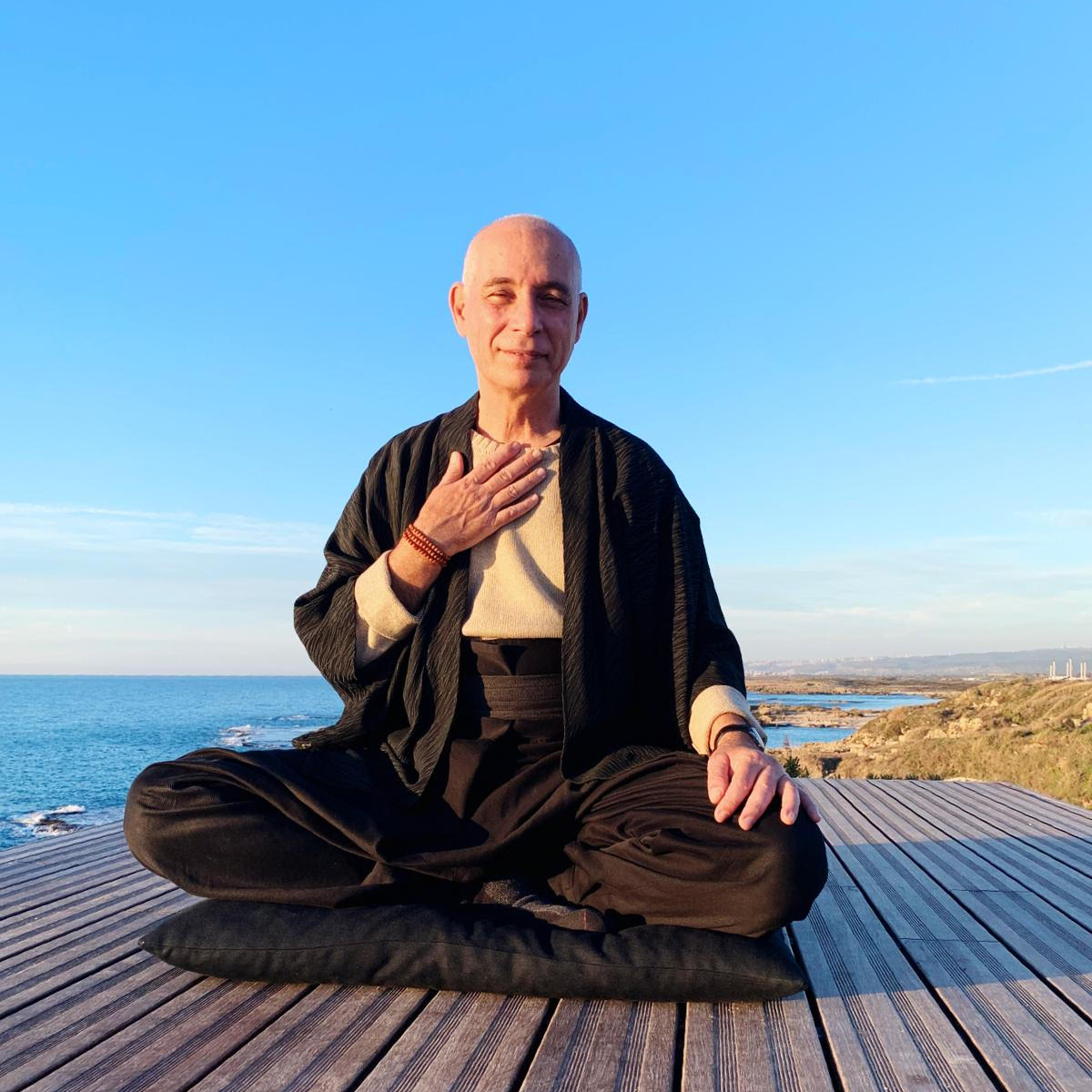
- Amon in 2022
- Born: 7 April 1963 (age 63); Jerusalem, Israel
- Occupations: Author; translator; Zen master; meditation teacher
- Known for: Trilotherapy
- Website: nissimamon.com

Nissim Amon (Hebrew: ניסים אמון; born 1963) is an Israeli Zen master and meditation teacher. He is the developer of the Trilotherapy therapeutic system and the author and translator of several books and publications.

== Biography ==
Nissim Amon was born in Jerusalem in 1963 to a secular family. He served in the Israel Defense Forces under the Nahal Brigade and fought in the Lebanon War. After his military service, he went on a trip to the Far East and became acquainted with Buddhism.

Amon later joined a Zen Buddhist monastery in South Korea, where he enrolled in a curriculum in English for Western monks. He became a monk under the guidance of Zen Master Seung Sahn and later received his accreditation as a Dharma teacher. Afterwards, he continued to Japan, where he joined the dojo of Zen Master G. W. Nishijima of the Soto Zen order, where he became a certified Zen master. From there, he continued to Pune, India and taught Zen at Osho's "Multiversity". There, he was exposed to various alternative therapeutic methods as well as Gestalt psychology.

== Writings ==
Amon is the author of books on meditation, Eastern philosophy, and spiritual practice, published primarily in Hebrew, with several works also available in English. His writings focus on Taoism and Zen Buddhism.

Among his more recent publications are The Book of Tao, a modern translation and commentary on Laozi's Tao Te Ching, and Eastern Wisdom, a collection of teachings drawn from Taoist, Buddhist, and Hindu traditions. His bibliography also includes titles such as Meditation: An Almost Complete Guide, The Secret of Inner Happiness (סוד האושר הפנימי), This Is Zen (זהו Zen), The Book of Dharma, and works of fiction and children's literature with philosophical themes.

== Personal life ==
Amon married Merav, and in 2001, the couple moved to the Greek island of Paros, where he established, along with his partners, a meditation and retreat center called Tao's. During his time there, he developed the Trilotherapy system.

== Publications ==
- ISBN 978-965-070-669-2 – Hidat Ha Lotus (The Lotus Riddle) (1997)
- ISBN 978-965-511-016-6 – KeShe Moshe Pagash et Buddha (When Moses Met Buddha)
- ISBN 978-965-733-900-8 – Mi Natan La Pil Af Aroch Ve Mi Matach et Ha Girafa? (Who Gave the Elephant a Long Snout and Who Stretched the Giraffe?) (Tao book for children) (2004)
- OCLC 710974849 – Avkat Namer (Tiger's Powder) (2011)
- OCLC 181941084 – Kwan Se Om (Music CD), with Ori Ofir
- ISBN 978-161-984-736-1 Eastern Wisdom: The Treasure Box (Gatekeeper Press, 2017)
