= Criminal Case (video game) =

2012 video game

- Developer: Pretty Simple
- Platforms: Facebook (HTML5), iOS, Android
- Release: Facebook; November 15, 2012 iOS; August 28, 2014; Android; April 15, 2015
- Genre: Puzzle

Criminal Case is a detective-themed hidden object game released on November 15, 2012, for Facebook. An iOS version was released worldwide on August 28, 2014, followed by an Android version on April 15, 2015. In 2018, the Facebook version was converted from Adobe Flash to HTML5. Developed and published by Paris indie studio Pretty Simple, Criminal Case has over ten million average monthly users. On December 9, 2013, Criminal Case was crowned the Facebook Game of the Year 2013. The game released its final case on January 21, 2021. In the game, the player is a detective solving crimes. Along the way, they earn coins, experience points (XP) which increases their level, rings, stickers for their album, and they can raise police canines.

== History ==
Pretty Simple was founded in 2010 by partners Bastien Cazenave and Corentin Raux and was backed by Idinvest Partners. Idenvest originally put up €300,000 in seed capital, which was followed by another €2.5 million after the game achieved a level of early modest success. The murder investigation theme was chosen first by the developers, who decided to make the game in the hidden object genre due to it making both business and personal sense. Just two months after the games launched, it had one million daily active users.

As of mid-2013, Criminal Case attracted more than ten million monthly average users and became highly competitive with Candy Crush Saga, the most popular game on Facebook with over 46 million average monthly users at that time. The developers explained in late 2013: "To put out an investigation each week, there are almost 30 people working on it. We have writers and artists who just really work hard to put out this content." On December 4, 2013, the game achieved over 100 million users.

Five days later, Criminal Case won the Facebook Game of the Year 2013 award. By this time, the cases had been translated into nine languages, and they were making an eight digit sum of revenue.

The game has a 40-percent share of Facebook users. Some reasons cited for the game's success include its graphic crime scenes and meaningful narratives. 2017 research by United Worldwide found that 80% of the active players are women aged between 30 and 55.

Seven additional titles, Criminal Case: Pacific Bay, Criminal Case: Save the World!, Criminal Case: Mysteries of the Past, Criminal Case: The Conspiracy, Criminal Case: Travel in Time, Criminal Case: Supernatural Investigations and Criminal Case: City of Romance were launched, the latter being the final game in the franchise.

== Critical reception ==
Australian Council on Children and the Media gave the game an amber rating (parental guidance required) due to containing gambling elements. Similarly, SaferKid cautioned parents that the title included crude humor and profanity. Common Sense Media deemed it "polished" and "interesting". AdWeek praised the game's strong story and interesting gameplay. The Spectrum felt the game was "oddly gruesome" and "whimsical". Funky Games thought it was one of the five best hidden object games for Android or iOS platforms. Kotaku described the game as dark and gritty, though felt that the pay-to-play element of gameplay held them back from progressing.
