= Franz Volkmar Reinhard =

German Protestant theologian (1753-1812)

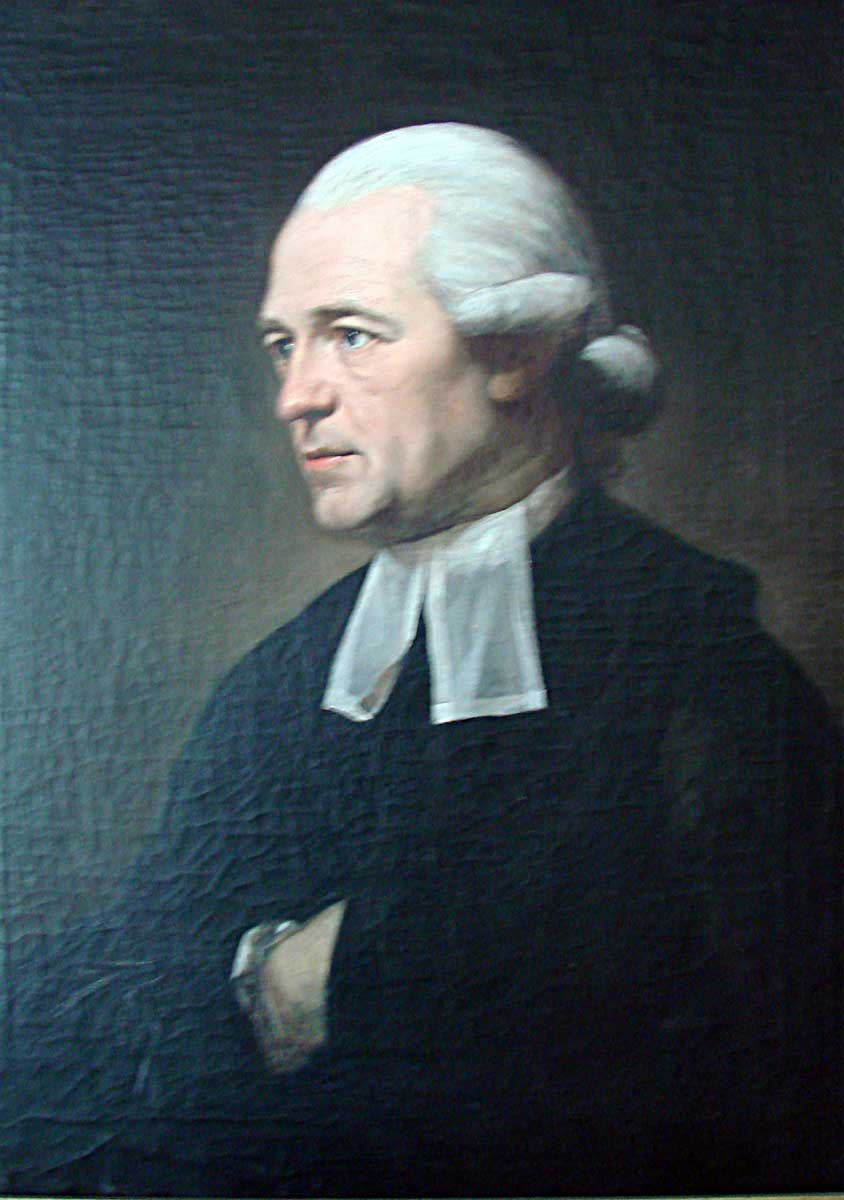
Franz Volkmar Reinhard

Franz Volkmar Reinhard (12 March 1753 – 6 September 1812) was a German Protestant theologian, born in Vohenstrauß.

== Biography ==
In 1780 he became an associate professor of theology and philosophy at the University of Wittenberg, where he served as rector in 1790–91. In 1792 he was appointed Oberhofprediger (first preacher) to the Saxon court in Dresden.

Reinhard was one of the more influential Protestant ministers of his era, and was an important representative of "enlightened theological supernaturalism". He was not opposed to contemporary rationalist thought, yet at the same time stressed the importance of divine supremacy and Biblical authority. In his sermons and lectures he attempted to establish the "truth of Lutheranism" by rational means.

Reinhard was a prominent figure in the Leben-Jesu-Forschung (Quest for the Historical Jesus) movement, a concept initiated by Hermann Samuel Reimarus (1694-1768). Reinhard also exerted considerable influence upon the German educational system.

He died in Dresden.

== Published works ==
Among written works attributed to him was a 39-volume collection of his sermons that were published between 1793 and 1837. Other noted publications by Reinhard include:

- Versuch über den Plan, welchen der Stifter der christlichen Religion.. (1781); translated into English in 1831 as "Plan of the Founder of Christianity".
- System der christlichen Moral (System of Christian morals); (1792).
- Vorlesungen über die Dogmatik (Lectures on dogmatics); (1801).
