= Hild (novel) =

2013 historical novel by Nicola Griffith

- Cover of the first UK edition of Hild
- Author: Nicola Griffith
- Language: English
- Series: The Hild Sequence
- Publisher: Farrar, Straus and Giroux (US); Blackfriars Books (UK)
- Publication date: November 12, 2013 (US); October 4, 2014 (UK)
- Publication place: United States
- Media type: Print (Hardcover, Trade Paperback)
- Pages: 560 pp
- ISBN: 9780349134253
- OCLC: 1784822222
- LC Class: PS3557.R48935
- Followed by: Menewood

Hild is a 2013 historical novel and the sixth novel by British author Nicola Griffith. Hild is a fictionalized telling of the life of Hilda of Whitby, also known as Hild of Streoneshalh, a significant figure in Anglo-Saxon England. The book includes a map, a glossary of terms, and a pronunciation guide.

The novel was first published in the United States by Farrar, Straus and Giroux on 12 November 2013 and in the United Kingdom on 4 October 4 2014 through Blackfriars Books. The second book in The Hild Sequence, Menewood, was published on 3 October 2023.

== Plot ==
In seventh-century Britain, small kingdoms are merging. Edwin of Northumbria plots to become the king of all the Angles through force, bribery, and religious coercion. The king's niece Hild grows up bright, curious, and willful in this world of violence and mysticism. She learns to fight with a knife or a staff and to speak several languages. Although her father has been assassinated, Hild survives to become an advisor to the king and ultimately to other major figures determining England's course in the Early Middle Ages.

== Development ==
Griffith's inspiration for Hild came when she visited Whitby Abbey for the first time in her twenties. She wanted to learn more about a powerful woman in the Middle Ages, and was later dismayed to find that there was very little information about the life of Saint Hilda. After reading Bede's Ecclesiastical History of the English People, she became intrigued:

[Bede] talks about very few women, and those he approves of he calls virgins. Whether or not they were [literally virgins], they were holy virgins, and that’s because that’s what good women were to him. But Hild was regarded so highly that kings and princes took her advice. She trained five bishops! I mean, Bede thought Hild was the bee’s knees, but he doesn’t call her a virgin, and then he leaves out this huge chunk of her life. We meet her when she’s 13, and then we don’t see her again until she’s 33 and just about to join the church. Everything else is missing. What was it that Bede didn’t approve of?

Griffith began researching seventh-century Britain and documented her research on her blog Gemæcce. She stated that she wanted to write the book in an immersive style in order to let the reader "experience the seventh century, to see, smell, hear, taste and feel what Hild does; to gradually adopt her mindset and worldview; to think as she does, to learn her lessons, feel her joys—to be her, just for a little while."

== Genre ==
According to Griffith, it is difficult to categorize The Hild Sequence for the purposes of award nominations, because it can be considered historical fiction, speculative fiction, literary fiction, disability fiction, queer and lesbian fiction, and a secret history. She considers both Hild and Menewood to fall under the umbrella of SFF (science fiction and fantasy) because "they use the narrative tools of science fiction, read like fantasy, and require the kind of reading skills honed by years of reading SFF." In a piece published in Reactor about how to categorize Hild, she wrote that she considers all historical fiction to be a form of speculative fiction or fantasy. Accordingly, the novel was nominated for speculative fiction prizes such as the Nebula Award and the Otherwise Award, then known as the Tiptree Award.

== Gender, sexuality, and disability representation ==
Griffith was intentional about representing women, queer people, disabled people, and people of color in The Hild Sequence. She has said that she wanted to see herself and other marginalized people "represented in a heroic past we’ve been told doesn’t belong to us... I want those like me to know there was a place for us then, there’s a place for us now, and so there will be a place for us in the future."

While writing the character, Griffith posited that Hild had two types of close personal relationship with women outside of her immediate family: her sexual partner and her gemæcce. Griffith created the grammatically feminine term gemæcce from the Old English masculine word gemæcca meaning "mate, equal, one of a pair, comrade, companion" and "husband or wife", which she repurposed to refer to a female friend and work partner.

As Hild was female and held a position in her uncle's court, Griffith realized that it would be possible for Hild to have sexual partners of either sex. Women of Hild's station would have to worry primarily about being discreet and careful about whom they selected. However Griffith also stated that:

Hild isn’t lesbian/homosexual. She’s bisexual. I doubt they had such terms back then, though. I’ve seen no evidence that who you did or did not have sex with defined how women thought of themselves. Actually, there’s no evidence for anything, sexually, in early seventh-century northern Britain. Nothing. No material culture and no text.

The way I see it, at the time, before widespread conversion to Roman Christianity, no one much cared who you did and didn’t have sex with. Sex wasn’t a moral issue. All royal women before the founding of nunneries [...] got married, and that if they then wanted to have sex with other women no one would much care as long as they were discreet. After all, the point of marriage was alliance, household management, and the provision of heirs. Married girls loving other married girls wouldn’t have any impact on any of these points.

== Reception ==
Critical reception for Hild has been positive and many compared the work to Dame Hilary Mantel's Wolf Hall. American historical novelist Cecelia Holland wrote in Locus Magazine that "Griffith’s description of how the little girl Hild foretells some events is deftly done [...] In dealing with the history the book is less effective, and for an interesting reason. Contrast this novel with Hillary Mantel’s Wolf Hall, which also treats a huge political landscape from the perspective of one character." Mantel could take advantage of the popularity of Tudor history and "never had to describe the ins and outs of Tudor politics; she could incorporate whole masses of data by a simple reference. ... Griffith has nothing like this. Very few people know anything at all" about fifth-century politics, historical figures, and linguistics. "So all this data falls on Hild to divulge, the whole tangle of little kingdoms, the people with names like Coelfrith... and Eadfrith..., the family feuds and the religious undercurrents..."

In contrast a reviewer for the Chicago Tribune wrote that the book had more in common with T. H. White's The Once and Future King and George R. R. Martin's Game of Thrones than with Wolf Hall. Amal El-Mohtar gave the work high praise in an NPR article, writing "Hild is a book as loving as it is fierce, brilliant and accomplished. To read it felt like a privilege and a gift."

The work also received praise from Publishers Weekly, who named it one of their "Books of the Week" on 11 November 2013, and the Seattle Times, who named it one of the "best titles of 2013".

=== Awards and recognition ===
- Tiptree Honor Book (2013)
- Nebula Award for Best Novel (2013, nominated)
- Washington State Book Award for Fiction (2014, winner)
- ALA GLBTRT Over the Rainbow Project list, Fiction (2014)
- ALA RUSA Notable Book, Historical Fiction (2014)
- Lambda Literary Award for Bisexual Fiction (2014, nominated)
- John W. Campbell Memorial Award for Best Science Fiction Novel (2014, nominated)
- Bisexual Book Award for Bisexual Fiction (2014, nominated)
- Guardian Not the Booker (2014, longlisted)

== Sequels ==
The sequel Menewood was published on 3 October 2023. Griffith has said that she plans to continue the Hild Sequence with a third book about Hild's journey to joining the Church and a fourth book about her religious life.
