= Ammon (geometer) =

3rd-century Roman geometrician

Ammon (Greek Ἄμμων) was a geometrician who made a measurement of the walls of Rome, around the time of the first invasion of the Goths, that is, the 3rd century AD, and found them to be 21 miles in circumference.
