= Franz Amon =

Franz Amon was the lead violinist and concertmaster of the dance orchestra of Johann Strauss I.

As the elder Strauss was against a musical career for his sons, Amon was contracted secretly by Anna Strauss to teach her son Johann Strauss II, to play the violin. Johann paid for the lessons by giving piano lessons to other students.
