= Friedrich August von Ammon =

German surgeon and ophthalmologist

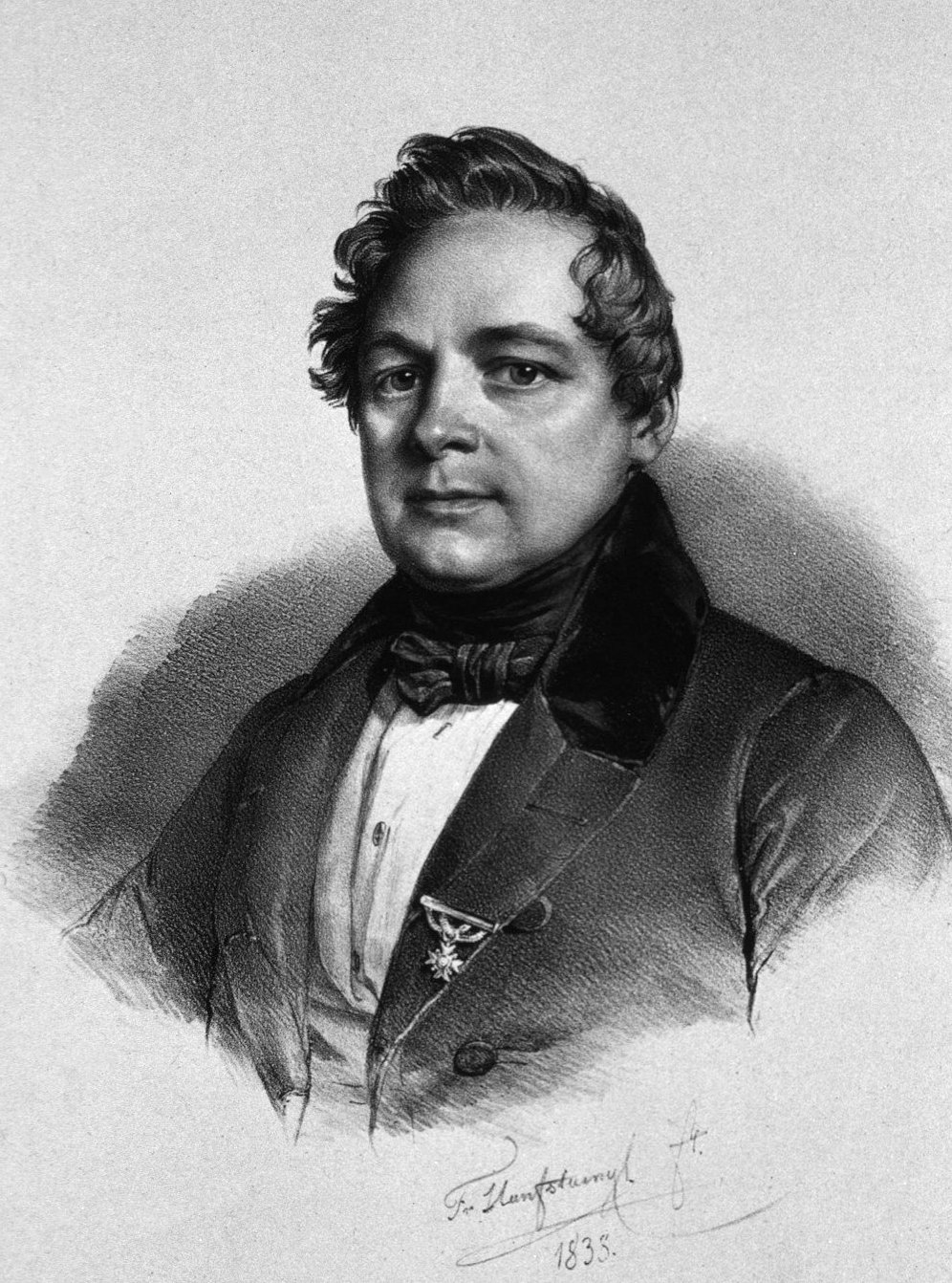
Friedrich August von Ammon

Friedrich August von Ammon (10 September 1799 – 18 May 1861) was a German surgeon and ophthalmologist born in Göttingen. He was the son of theologian Christoph Friedrich von Ammon (1766–1850).

He studied medicine at the Universities of Göttingen and Leipzig and, following an educational journey through Germany and Paris, he settled in Dresden in 1823 as a physician. Here, his primary focus was surgical and surgical-anatomical duties. In 1828, he attained the title of professor, becoming director of the surgical-medical academy in Dresden. In 1837, he was named royal physician to Friedrich August II, King of Saxony.

Known for his work in ophthalmology, he was instrumental in making Dresden a center of ophthalmic learning during his lifetime. In 1830, he founded Zeitschrift für die Ophthalmologie (lit. Journal of Ophthalmology), an early journal devoted to ophthalmology. In his prize-winning book, De Iritide (1835), he made contributions to investigations of iritis and sympathetic ophthalmia.

His most ambitious written effort in the field of ophthalmology was Klinische Darstellung der Krankheiten und Bildungsfehler des menschlichen Auges (Clinical Presentation of Diseases and Developmental Defects of the Human Eye), a monograph published in 1947. It was acclaimed for its comprehensive treatment of eye disease, as well as for its superb hand-colored illustrations and descriptions of congenital eye anomalies.

One of Ammon's earlier works was an 1823 impartial comparative study between French and German surgery titled Vergleich zwischen französischer und deutscher Chirurgie (Comparison between French and German Surgery). In 1842, he co-authored a significant book on plastic surgery, Die plastische Chirurgie (Plastic Surgery).

== Marriage ==
Ammon was first married to Natalie Redlich (1808-1842) on 1 December, 1824, in Dresden.

=== Issue ===
- Anna Wilhelmine Klara von Ammon (1825-1899). Married to General Clemens Heinrich Lothar, Freiherr von Hausen and had issue.
- Lothar Friedrich Clemens von Hausen (24 September, 1845-19 February, 1920), born and died in Dresden. Married to Anna Charlotte Louise Platzmann.
- Max von Hausen (17 December, 1846-19 March, 1922), born and died in Dresden. Married to Marie Josephine Mathilde Helene Karoline von Salviati.
- Helene Natalie Anna von Hausen (13 April, 1849-4 August, 1906), born in Dresden and died in Gönnsdorf, near Bühlau. Married to Kurt Heinrich von Schmalz.
- Arndt Clemens Lothar von Hausen (1 July, 1851-27 March, 1919), born and died in Dresden. Married to Amélie Victorie Lampe-Vischer.

Ammon was then married to Natalie Ernestine Baranow (née von Bodelschwing). They had no issue.

== Selected writings ==
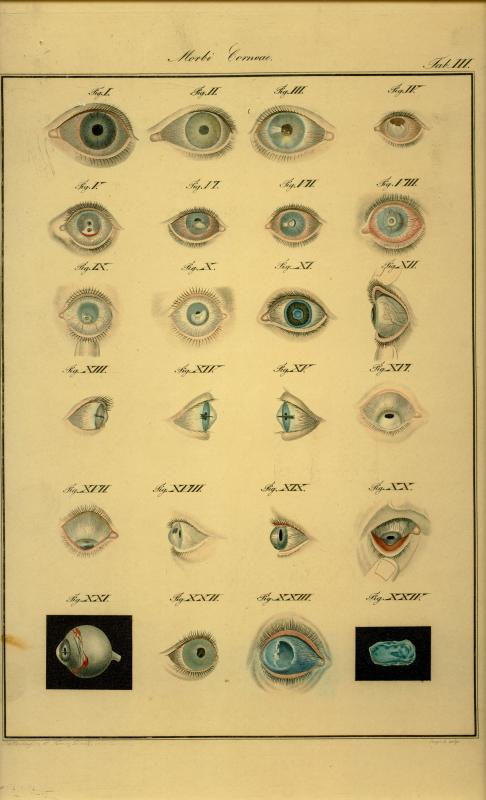
A page from Klinische Darstellung

- De genesi et usu maculae luteae in retina oculi humani obviae (On the Genesis and Use of the Macula Lutea in the Retina of the Human Eye). Weimar 1830.
- Die Erkenntniss und die Behandlung der asiatischen Cholera : mit Berücksichtigung der durch Leichenöffnungen gewonnenen Aufklärungen über das Wesen dieser Krankheit und mit einem Verzeichnisse der bei Behandlung derselben erprobten und vorgeschlagenen Heilmittel und Heilformeln versehen (The Recognition and Treatment of Asiatic Cholera: With Consideration of the Insights Gained from Autopsies Regarding the Nature of This Disease, and Provided with a List of Remedies and Therapeutic Formulas Tested and Proposed for Its Treatment). Walther, Dresden 3rd edition 1831. Digital edition by the University and State Library Düsseldorf.
- De physiologia tenotomiae (The Physiology of Tenotomy). Dresden 1837.
- Klinische Darstellung der Krankheiten und Bildungsfehler des menschlichen Auges etc. (Clinical Presentation of Diseases and Malformations of the Human Eye, etc.). Berlin 1838–1847, four volumes.
- Die Behandlung des Schielens durch den Muskelschnitt (The Treatment of Strabismus through Muscle Incision). Berlin 1840.
- De Iritide (On Iritis). Berlin 1843.
- Illustrierte pathologische Anatomie der menschlichen Kornea, Sklera, Choroidea und des optischen Nerom (Illustrated Pathological Anatomy of the Human Cornea, Sclera, Choroid, and Optic Nerve). Hrsg. von Warnatz, Leipzig 1862.
- Die angebornen chirurgischen Krankheiten des Menschen (The Congenital Surgical Diseases of Man). Berlin 1839–1842.
- Die plastische Chirurgie (Plastic Surgery), with Moritz Baumgarten. Berlin 1842.

== See also ==
- Pathology
- List of pathologists
