= Ammon Shea =

American writer

Ammon Shea is an American writer, known for his nonfiction books about the English language. With Peter Novobatzky, he wrote Depraved English (1999) and Insulting English (2001), which highlight obscure and unusual English words. Shea later read the entire Oxford English Dictionary, and documented his observations in Reading the OED: One Man, One Year, 21,730 Pages (2008). He was subsequently hired to work at Oxford University Press as a consulting editor of American dictionaries. Shea has also contributed to the "On Language" column in Sunday's New York Times. Shea is also the author of The Phone Book: The Curious History of the Book That Everyone Uses But No One Reads (2010) and Bad English: A History of Linguistic Aggravation (2014)

A dictionary collector, Shea had already read Webster's Second International Dictionary in the 1990s. During his life, he has worked as a gondolier, a mover, and a busker.
