= Monsieur Amon =

French coffee and real estate entrepreneur (1849-1915)

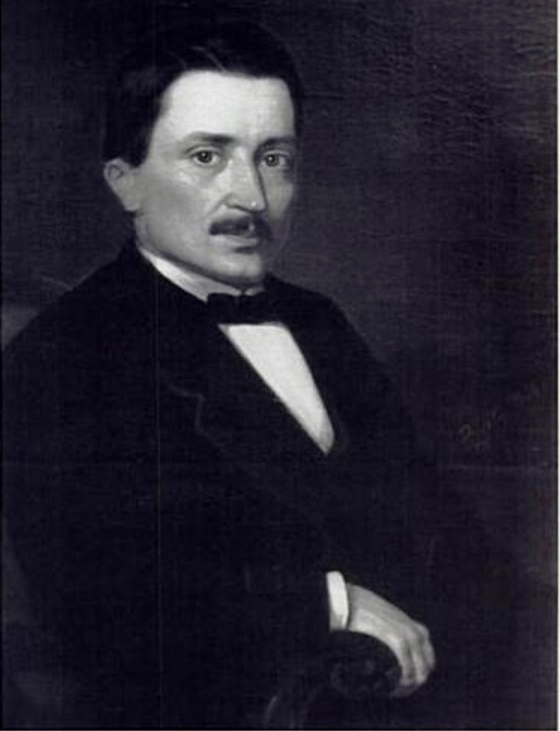
- Achilles Bigot,1884
- Born: 22 December 1849; Bordeaux
- Died: 24 February 1915 (aged 65)

Amon Fasileau-Duplantier, known as Monsieur Amon (22 December 1849 – 24 February 1915), was a French coffee and urban real estate entrepreneur established in Costa Rica. Monsieur Amon commercial activities had a deep impact on the Costa Rican society of the latest 19th century due to the foundation of San José's Belle Époque neighborhood which carries his name today as the Barrio Amón. The image of Monsieur Amon is associated to Costa Rican coffee golden age.

== Life ==
Monsieur Amon was born in Bordeaux. He arrived to Costa Rica in his mid-twenties to work at The Tournon Company, owned by his brother-in-law, Mr. Hippolyte Tournon. The company already produced and exported coffee; Monsieur Amon was entrusted to manage the firm and became a respected local figure with a key influence in the social and economic spheres. He started the diversification into urban real estate and electricity production, coinciding with Minor Keith's development of similar activities, leveraging the Atlantic railroad construction and growing banana trade. Amon returned to France in 1899 after being replaced by his nephew, Elois Tournon, son of Mr. Hippolyte Tournon, as the head of the Tournon Company.

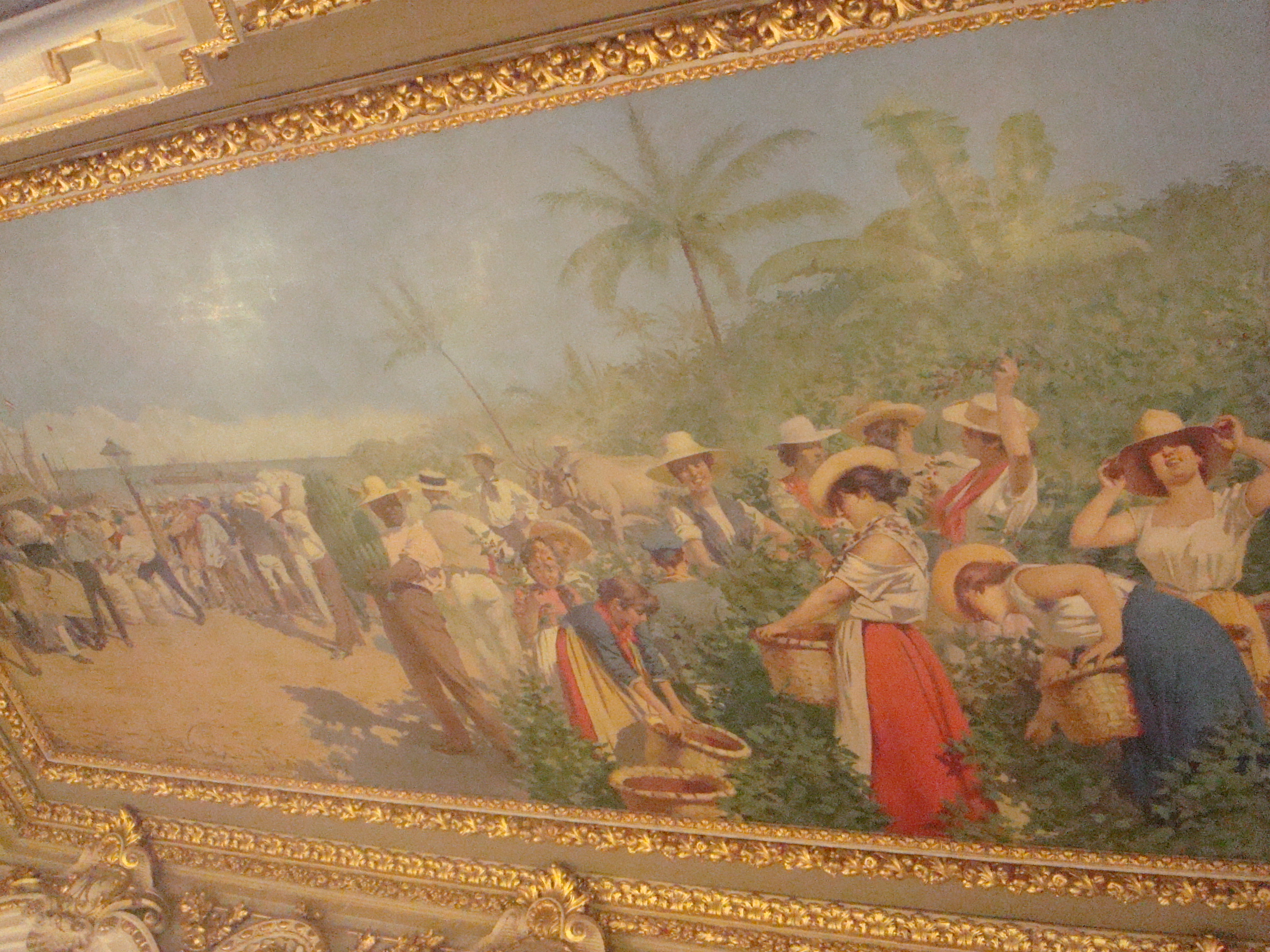
Allegorical image of coffee and banana plantation. Costa Rica National Theatre

== Founding of Barrio Amón ==
On 5 February 1892, Amón presented a proposal to the Municipality of San José to urbanize land he owned north of the city center. A contract was finalized two years later, in 1894, after which the area began to be known as Barrio Amón.

The land was formally subdivided into lots in 1897 and sold to San José's rising bourgeoisie, who built residences influenced by Victorian, eclectic, and other European architectural styles, making the neighborhood the city's first private, developer-led residential district.
