= Ammonite (novel) =

1992 novel by Nicola Griffith

- First UK edition
- Author: Nicola Griffith
- Cover artist: Trevor Scobie
- Language: English
- Genre: Science fiction novel
- Publisher: Del Rey (US); Grafton (UK)
- Publication date: 23 December 1992
- Publication place: United States
- Media type: Print (Paperback)
- Pages: 360
- ISBN: 978-0-345-37891-0
- OCLC: 27296707
- LC Class: PS3557.R48935 A8 1993

Ammonite is science fiction novel by British-American author Nicola Griffith. Its also Griffith’s debut novel, which was published in 1992. American sci-fi author Ursula Le Guin cited Ammonite as "a knock-out first novel, with strong, likeable characters, a compelling story, and a very interesting take on gender".

Critically acclaimed and academically praised, the novel won several literary awards, including the Lambda Literary Award for LGBT themed science fiction/fantasy, and the Otherwise Award, formerly known as the James Tiptree Jr. Award, for science fiction or fantasy that explores or expands our understanding of gender. In 2008, the Italian translation of Ammonite was awarded the Premio Italia award, an Italian literary prize for astounding works in science fiction and fantasy. The novel was also shortlisted for the Arthur C. Clarke Award, the British Science Fiction Award, and the Locus Award for a debut novel.

In September 2012 Ammonite was included in the SF Masterworks relaunch series of softcover editions (2010–present). The series is composed of classic science fiction literature that is deemed important and considered deserving of being in continuous print.

== Plot summary ==
Ammonite is the story of Marghe Taishan, an anthropologist and employee of a government agency, the Settlement and Education Councils (SEC). She is sent as an SEC representative to the planet Jeep (Grenchstom's Planet – "Jeep" being the pronunciation of the abbreviation "GP"). Centuries in the past, Jeep was colonized by people from Earth, but contact was lost with the colony, and now the planet is a target for recolonization by the sinister Durallium Company (mostly referred to as "Company"). Some years prior to the beginning of the story, Company sent an expedition of technical and security personnel (the latter called "Mirrors" for the mirrored helmets on their combat armor) to the planet, where they establish a base known as Port Central. Shortly after arriving, all of the men and many of the women in the expedition died from a virus, also known as Jeep, which was endemic to the planet. As a result, the planet was placed under quarantine, and none of the surviving members of the expedition have been allowed to leave. One of the mysteries of the planet is that there is a "native" population, entirely female and apparently descended from the original colony.

Marghe is sent to Jeep not only to study the native cultures, but also to test a potential vaccine for the Jeep virus. She makes a journey across Jeep, living with several of its indigenous cultures and establishing diplomatic relationships known as "trata" with another group known as Holme Valley. Shortly after the start of her journey, she is captured and enslaved by the nomadic Echraidhe, one of whose members, Uaithne, believes herself to be the Death Spirit, the chosen representative of the goddess of death destined to bring about an apocalypse.

Meanwhile, Hannah Danner, commander of Port Central, becomes aware of spy activity on base. She receives a message from Marghe; due to the way it is encoded (via knots similar to Incan quipu), she believes that the vaccine has failed. She becomes increasingly paranoid that Company will destroy the space station orbiting Jeep. Unwilling to spare any personnel, she breaks trata with Holme Valley, who are now at war with the Echraidhe.

Marghe escapes the Echraidhe and almost dies in the extreme winter, but manages to reach the village of Ollfoss, where she joins a family and stops taking the vaccine. The virus infects her, and she survives, joining a native family. She meets a "viajera", or traveling wise woman, named Thenike, and learns the mystic discipline of "deepsearch". The two fall in love and conceive children through deepsearch, a process involving deep meditation which allows one to control the ovulation process and perform parthenogenesis in tandem with another woman, the offspring of which are called "soestre" to each other. The virus also gives her the ability to remember information from past lives.

Marghe returns to Port Central, where she is forced into the center of a conflict between the Mirrors and the Echraidhe under the leadership of Uaithne. Marghe stops the conflict, but shortly thereafter Company, believing the vaccine to have been a failure, destroys the space station orbiting Jeep, apparently isolating the people there. However, Marghe and the Mirrors believe that the Company will probably return one day, a return they must prepare for.

== Awards and recognition ==
Awards
Year	Award	Result
1993	Lambda Literary Award	Won
1993	Otherwise Award	Won
1994	Arthur C. Clarke Award	Nominated
1994	BSFA Award	Nominated
1994	Locus Award	Nominated
2008	Premio Italia	Won

- SF Masterworks series
- The Internet Speculative Fiction Database (ISFDB) Top 100 Novels
- The World Without End (WWEnd) Top Science Fiction Books
