= Ammon of Elearchia =

4th and 5th-century Bishop of Elearchia

Ammon (Greek Ἄμμων) was a bishop of Elearchia, in Thebaid, in the 4th and 5th centuries. To him is addressed the canonical epistle of Theophilus of Alexandria. Papebrochius published in a Latin version his Epistle to Theophilus, De Vita et Conversalione SS. Pachomii et Theodori. It contains an Epistle of St. Antony.
