= Diva Amon =

Marine biologist

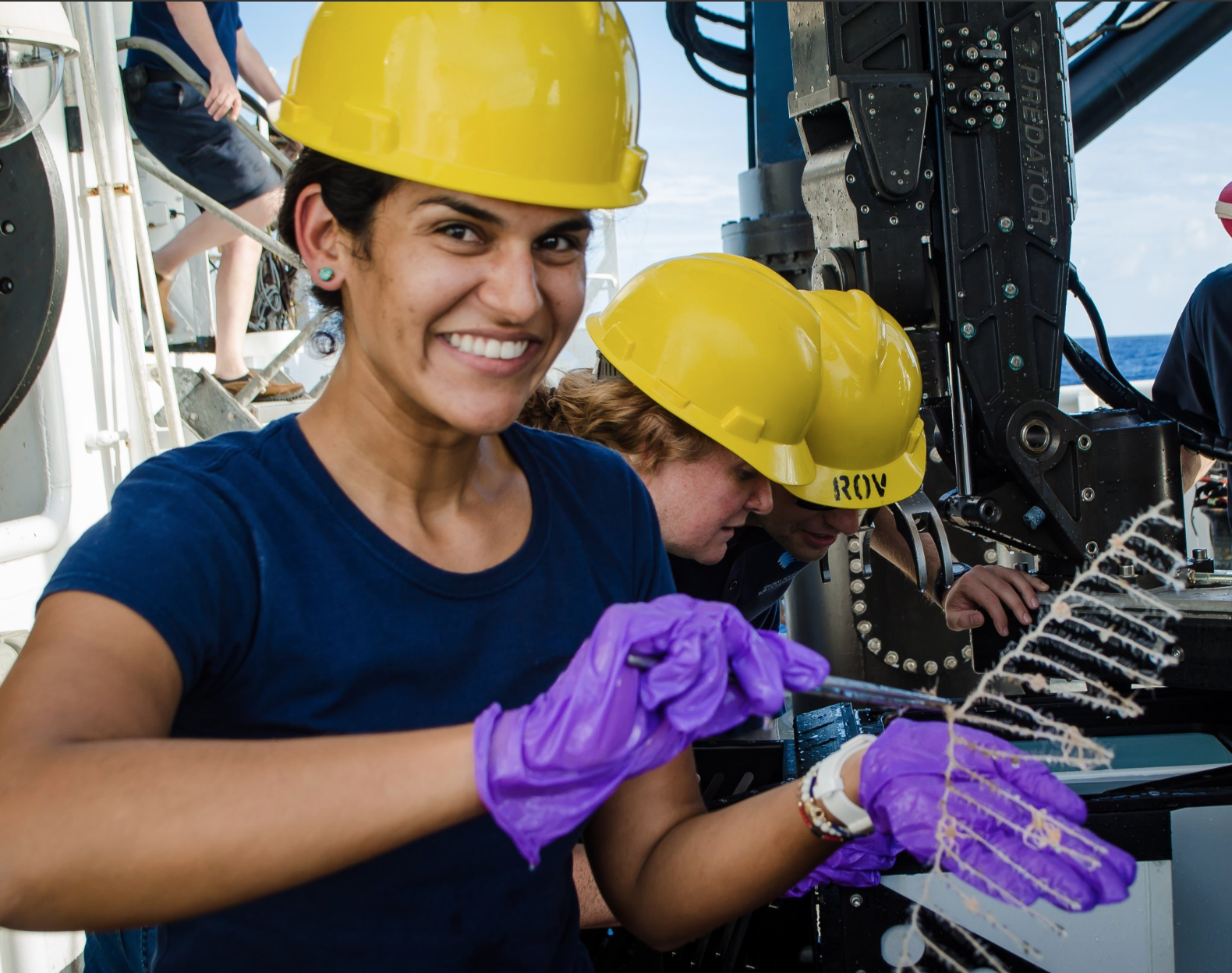
- Born: Diva Joan Amon
- Education: St. Joseph's Convent, St. Joseph; University of Southampton (MSc, PhD)
- Scientific career
- Workplaces: Natural History Museum, London; University of Hawaii at Manoa
- Thesis: Bone-eating worms and wood-eating bivalves: characterising the ecology of deep-sea organic falls from multiple ocean basins (2013)
- Doctoral advisor: Adrian Glover; Jonathan Copley
- Website: divaamon.com

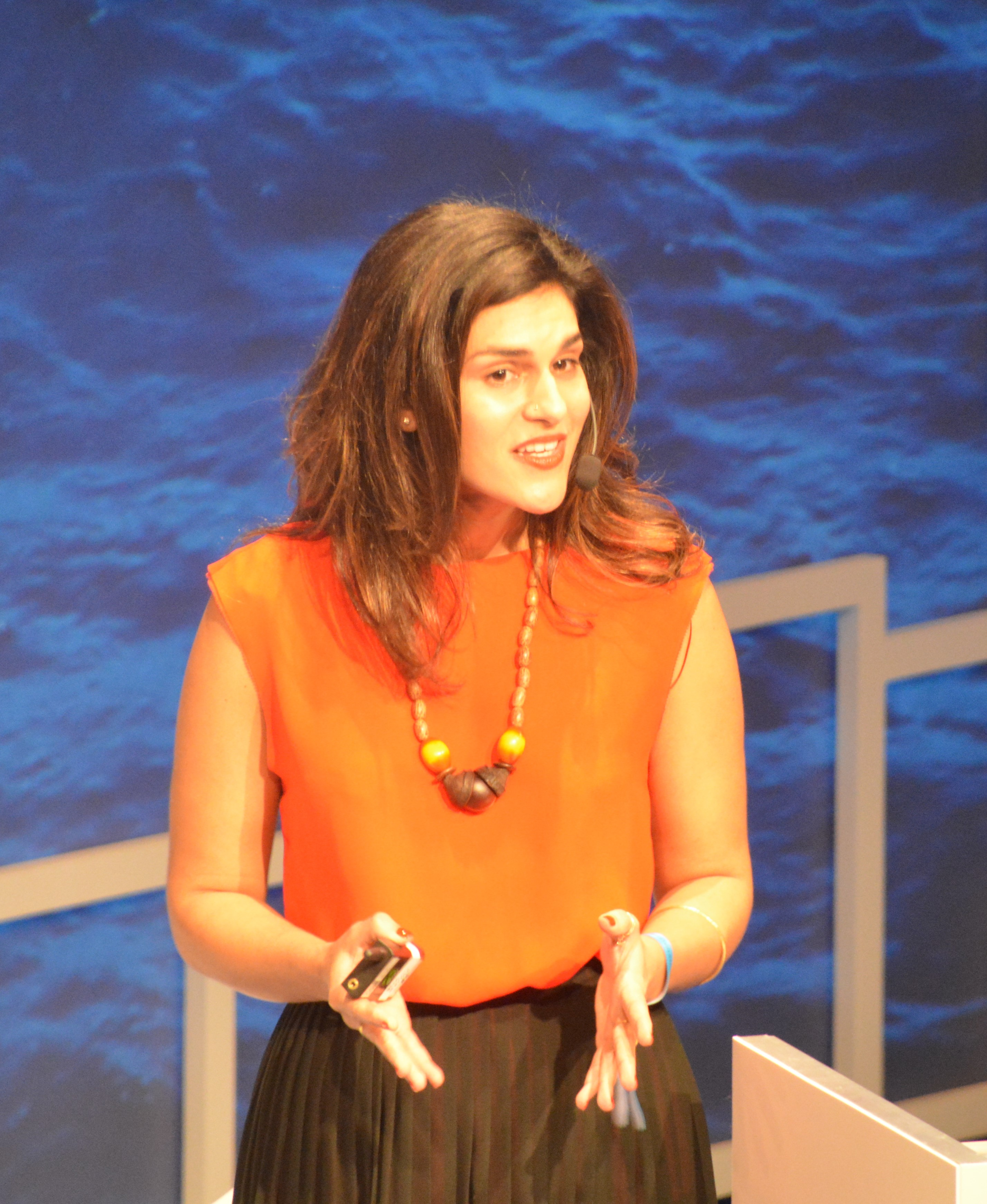
Amon at Nobel Week Dialogue 2018 in Stockholm

Diva Joan Amon is a marine biologist from Trinidad. She is currently a post-doctoral researcher in the Benioff Ocean Initiative at the University of California, Santa Barbara and a 2022 Pew Marine Fellow. Previously, she was a Marie Skłodowska-Curie Actions (MSCA) Research Fellow at the Natural History Museum, London.

== Early life and education ==
Amon grew up in Trinidad. She attended St. Joseph's Convent in Port of Spain. Her sister is astrophysicist and cosmologist Dr. Alexandra Amon. She earned a master's degree in marine biology at the University of Southampton in 2009. During her degree she learned that 95% of the deep ocean is unexplored, and decided to stay in this field for her postgraduate studies. During her PhD she took part in I'm a Scientist, Get me out of here!. She completed her doctoral training in chemosynthetic environments under the supervision of Adrian Glover and Jonathan Copley, working between the University of Southampton and the Natural History Museum, London. Her PhD was funded by the graduate school of the National Oceanography Centre scholarship. She studied hydrothermal vents in the Cayman Trough and spent three weeks on the R/V Yokosuka and the DSV Shinkai 6500.

== Research and career ==
Amon was appointed a postdoctoral research fellow at the University of Hawaii at Manoa in 2013. She was manager of the Abyssal Baseline (ABYSSLINE) project. Her research consisted of the poly-metallic nodules in the Clarion-Clipperton fracture zone. She spends between one and three months on board a ship, collecting samples to take back for analysis in her lab. These included megafauna, macrofauna, meiofauna and microbes. She discovered nine new deep-sea species, including anemone and two new sponges. She was part of the Nautilus Exploration Program.

Amon has taken part in 15 research expeditions. In 2016, she boarded the National Oceanic and Atmospheric Administration ship Okeanos Explorer and explored the deep ocean near the Saint Peter and Saint Paul Archipelago, which was covered in BioGraphic, The Atlantic, and Scientific American. The live feed from the ship's remotely operated underwater vehicle received 2.7 million views. She is the founder of SpeSeas, a non-profit that supports marine research in the Caribbean. Her research has been featured in several international newspapers. She has also contributed to the HuffPost, Gizmodo, the Smithsonian magazine, Scientific American and Business Insider. In 2017, she appeared on the CNN show Wild Discoveries. Amon has featured on the YouTube channel Exploring By the Seat of Your Pants.

In 2018, Amon began a two-year Marie Skłodowska-Curie Research Fellow at the Natural History Museum, London. She is on the advisory board of the Deep-Ocean Stewardship Initiative (DOSI) and All Hands on Deck. In July 2018, she won the International Seabed Authority Secretary General's Award for Excellence in Deep Sea Research. In 2022, she was awarded a Pew Fellowship in Marine Conservation.

In 2021, Amon joined actor Will Smith on Disney Plus's Welcome to Earth documentary. As the pair descended 3,300 feet to the bottom of the ocean in a deep-water submersible, Amon investigated how color is used in the natural world.
