= Nicola Griffith =

British-American writer (b. 1960)

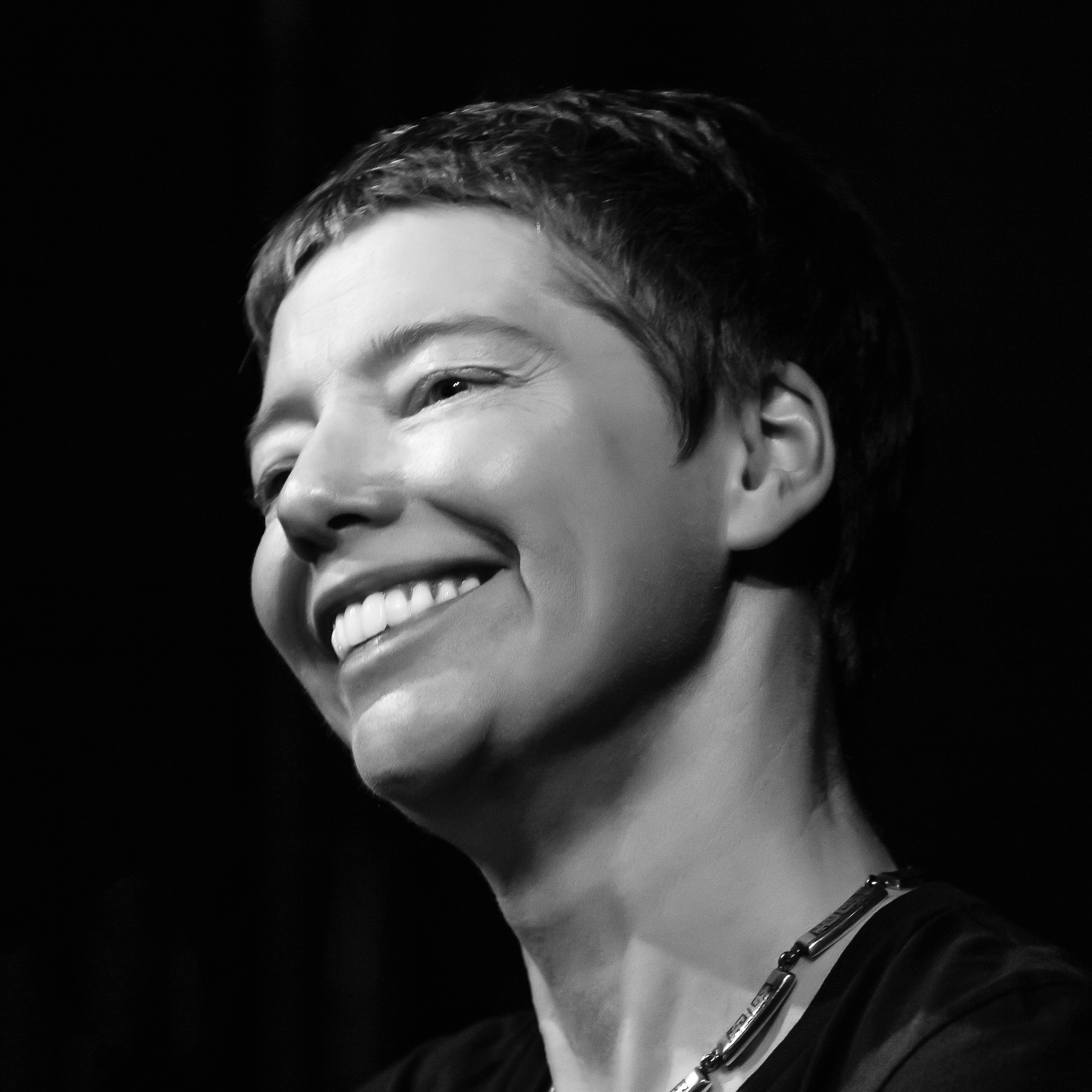
- Nicola Griffith (2014)
- Born: 30 September 1960 (age 66); Yorkshire, England
- Citizenship: United Kingdom and United States
- Occupations: Novelist; short story author; essayist
- Writing career
- Period: 1987–present
- Genre: Fiction
- Website: nicolagriffith.com

Nicola Griffith (/ˈnɪkələ ˈɡrɪfɪθ/; born 30 September 1960) is a British-American novelist, essayist, and teacher. She has won the Washington State Book Award (twice), Nebula Award, James Tiptree, Jr. Award, World Fantasy Award, Los Angeles Times Book Prize, and six Lambda Literary Awards. In 2024 she was inducted into the Science Fiction and Fantasy Hall of Fame. In 2025, the Science Fiction and Fantasy Writers Association named her the 41st Damon Knight Memorial Grand Master in recognition of her significant contributions to the literature of science fiction and fantasy. In addition to her fiction, Griffith is known for her contributions to feminist and queer literature, her disability advocacy, and her role in founding the Literary Prize Database Project and the #CripLit community for disabled writers.

== Personal life ==
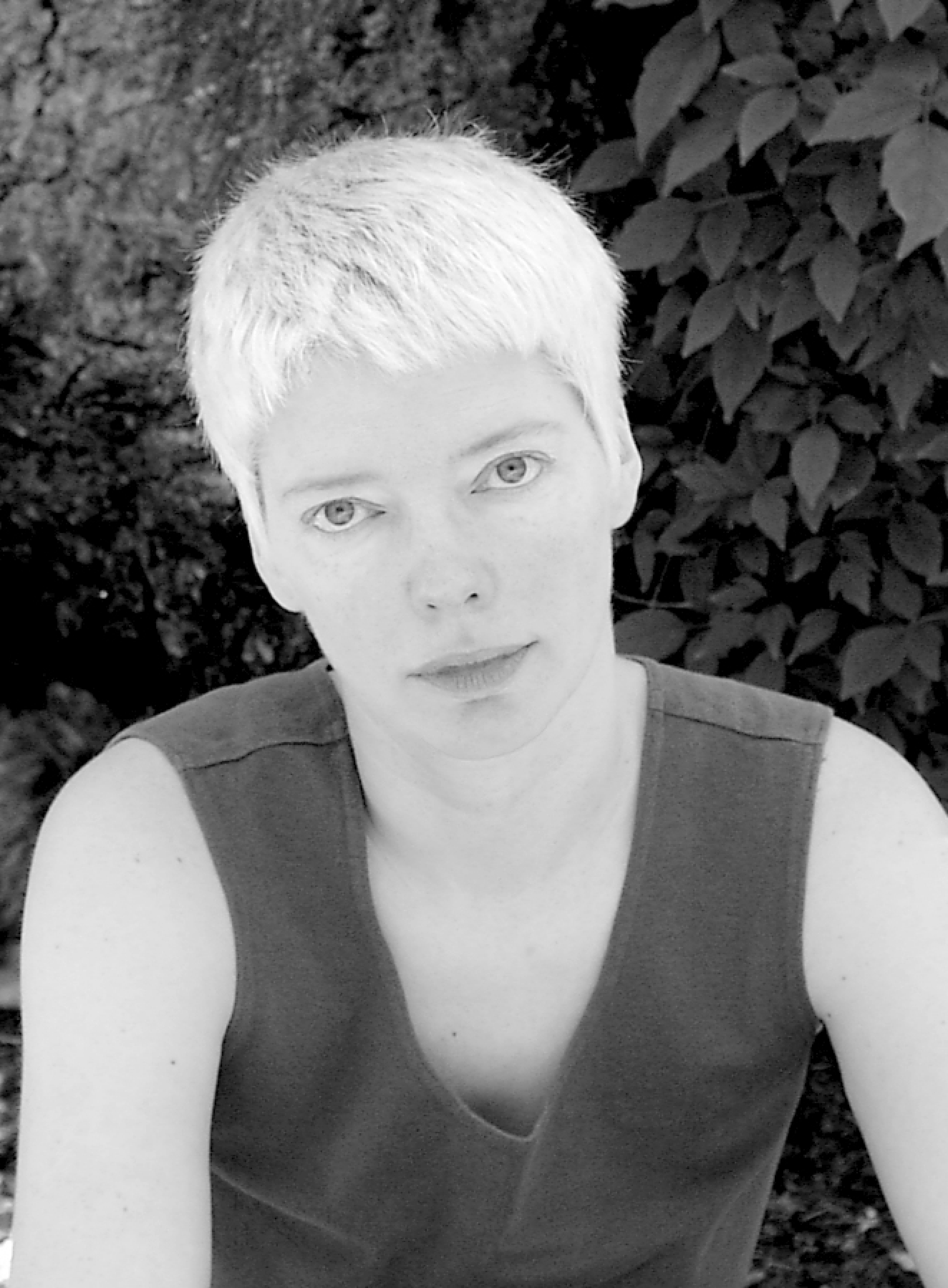
Nicola Griffith in 2007

Griffith was born 30 September 1960 in Leeds, to Margaret and Eric Griffith. Griffith's family is Catholic and she is one of five children. She knew she was gay by age 13.

Griffith is cousin to British actor Clare Higgins.

Griffith's earliest surviving literary efforts include an illustrated booklet she was encouraged to create to prevent her from making trouble among her fellow nursery school students. At age eleven she won a BBC student poetry prize and read aloud her winning work for radio broadcast.

Her early reading included the works of such novelists as Henry Treece and Rosemary Sutcliff; fantastic fiction including the works of E. E. Smith, Frank Herbert, and J. R. R. Tolkien; nonfiction and history – Edward Gibbon's The History of the Decline and Fall of the Roman Empire was a particular favorite.

Griffith took interest in the sciences as a teenager. She entered University of Leeds to study microbiology but did not complete a degree. Griffith was the lead singer and cofounder of the band Janes Plane, which experienced some success in England before breaking up.

By the late 1980s, Griffith had begun experiencing symptoms of multiple sclerosis (MS), though her illness remained undiagnosed. She was diagnosed with MS in March 1993.

While studying at Michigan State University, Griffith met and fell in love with fellow writer Kelley Eskridge. On 4 September 1993, Griffith and Eskridge announced their commitment ceremony in The Atlanta Journal-Constitution, perhaps the first same-sex commitment announcement the paper had published. Griffith and Eskridge were legally married 4 September 2013.

Griffith wanted citizenship so she could remain in the country with her wife, but because she was a lesbian, she couldn't receive citizenship through marriage, and all other pathways were closed. After much effort, Griffith received permission to live and work in the United States based on her "importance as a writer of lesbian/science fiction," making her the first out lesbian to receive a National Interest Waiver. Her immigration resulted in a new law, and she is now a dual US/UK citizen.

== Career ==
In late 1987 Griffith made her first professional fiction sale: "Mirrors and Burnstone" to Interzone. Her debut novel, Ammonite, received several offers from publishers, including St. Martin's Press, Avon Press, and Del Rey Books. Griffith has since published nine full-length novels, a memoir, and numerous short stories, essays, and novellas. While Griffith has said that she "resists labels to describe her work," much of her published material contains themes of gender and sexuality.

Literary Activism

In 2015, Griffith "founded the Literary Prize Data working group whose purpose initially was to assemble data on literary prizes in order to get a picture of how gender bias operates within the trade publishing ecosystem."

In 2015 she began #CripLit, an online community for disabled writers."

Major Works

In 2017, after completing her thesis, entitled "Norming the Queer: Narrative Empathy via Focalised Heterotopia," Griffith received her PhD by publication from Anglia Ruskin University.

Critics have described Stay as both an allegorical and cautionary novel, emphasizing its focus on the protagonist’s effort to reclaim her sense of self following profound personal loss.

Griffith released She Is Here in February 2026. It contains six nonfiction essays, four poems, three short stories, a novella, drawings, and an interview with Nisi Shawl.

Griffith spent nearly ten years researching early medieval Britain for Hild, drawing on historical and scientific methods to construct the novel’s setting and social structures.

Griffith has identified Hild as her first explicitly bisexual protagonist, written in response to the underrepresentation of bisexual characters in fiction.

So Lucky is an autobiographical novel that follows a woman navigating life after being diagnosed with relapsing-remitting multiple sclerosis.

Critics have noted So Lucky incorporates disability activism and critiques medical and pharmaceutical systems.

Griffith created the character Aud Torvingen, a lesbian crime fighter who first appeared in the novel The Blue Place (1998) and later returned in subsequent novels such as Stay.

Griffith has described Aud Torvingen as a central figure in her crime fiction series and planned additional novels featuring the character.

== Awards and honors ==
Year	Title	Award	Category	Result	Ref.
1993	Ammonite	BSFA Award	—	Shortlisted	
1993	Ammonite	James Tiptree, Jr. Award	—	Won	
1993	Ammonite	Lambda Literary Award	Lesbian Science Fiction/Fantasy	Won	
1993	Touching Fire	James Tiptree, Jr. Award	—	Longlisted	
1994	Ammonite	Arthur C. Clarke Award	—	Shortlisted	
1994	Ammonite	Locus Award	First Novel	Shortlisted	
1995	"Yaguara"	Nebula Award	Novella	Nominated	
1996	Slow River	Nebula Award	Novel	Won	
1996	Slow River	Lambda Literary Award	Science Fiction/Fantasy	Won	
1998	Bending the Landscape	Lambda Literary Award	Science Fiction/Fantasy	Won	
1999	The Blue Place	Gaylactic Spectrum Awards	Novel	Nominated	
1999	The Blue Place	Lambda Literary Award	Lesbian Mystery	Won	
1999	Bending the Landscape: Science Fiction	Gaylactic Spectrum Awards	Other Work	Won	
1999	Bending the Landscape: Science Fiction	Lambda Literary Award	Science Fiction/Fantasy	Won	
2000	Slow River	Gaylactic Spectrum Awards	Hall of Fame	Won	
2002	Bending the Landscape: Horror	Gaylactic Spectrum Awards	Other Work	Won	
2002	Bending the Landscape: Horror	Lambda Literary Award	Anthology	Finalist	
2002	Bending the Landscape: Horror	Lambda Literary Award	Science Fiction/Fantasy	Finalist	
2003	Stay	Lambda Literary Award	Lesbian Fiction	Finalist	
2005	With Her Body	Gaylactic Spectrum Awards	Other Work	Finalist	
2005	With Her Body	Lambda Literary Award	Science Fiction/Fantasy	Finalist	
2008	And Now We Are Going to Have a Party	Lambda Literary Award	Lesbian Memoir or Biography	Won	
2010	"It Takes Two"	Hugo Award	Novelette	Finalist	
2013	Hild	Bisexual Book Awards	Fiction	Shortlisted	
2013	Hild	James Tiptree, Jr. Award	—	Honor	
2013	Hild	Nebula Award	Novel	Finalist	
2014	Hild	John W. Campbell Memorial Award	—	Shortlisted	
2014	Hild	Washington State Book Award	Fiction	Won	
2018	So Lucky	Over the Rainbow Booklist	—	Top 10	
2019	So Lucky	Pacific Northwest Booksellers Association Award	—	Shortlisted	
2019	So Lucky	Tournament of Books	—	Shortlisted	
2019	So Lucky	Washington State Book Award	Fiction	Won	
2022	Spear	Los Angeles Times Book Prize	Ray Bradbury Prize	Won	
2022	Spear	Nebula Award	Novel	Finalist	
2023	Spear	HWA Crown Awards	Gold	Longlisted	
2023	Spear	Locus Award	Fantasy Novel	Nominated	
2023	Spear	Ursula K. Le Guin Prize	—	Shortlisted	
2023	Spear	World Fantasy Award	Novel	Shortlisted	

== Publications ==
=== Fiction ===
- —— (1992). Ammonite. Del Rey. ISBN 9780345452382.
- —— (1995). Slow River. Ballantine Books. ISBN 9780345395375.
- —— (2018). So Lucky. MCD x FSG Originals. ISBN 9780374265922.
- —— (2022). Spear. Tordotcom. ISBN 9781250819321.

==== Aud Torvingen series ====
- —— (1998). The Blue Place. William Morrow. ISBN 9780380974467.
- —— (2002). Stay. Black Lizard. ISBN 9781400032303.
- —— (2007). Always. Riverhead Books. ISBN 9781594489358.

==== The Hild Sequence series ====
- —— (2013). Hild. Picador. ISBN 9781250056092.
- —— (2023). Menewood. MCD. ISBN 9780374208080.

=== Nonfiction ===
- —— (2007). And Now We Are Going to Have a Party: Liner Notes to a Writer's Early Life. Payseur & Schmidt. ISBN 9780978911416.

=== Anthologies ===
- Bending the Landscape: Fantasy, Overlook Books, ISBN 9781585675760 (1997, with Stephen Pagel)
- Bending the Landscape: Science Fiction, Overlook Books, ISBN 9780879517328 (1998, with Stephen Pagel)
- Bending the Landscape: Horror, Overlook Books, ISBN 9781585673728 (2001, with Stephen Pagel)

=== Collections ===
- —— (2004). With Her Body. Aqueduct Press. ISBN 9780974655949.
- —— (2014). Cold Wind. Tor Books. ISBN 9781466871342.
- —— (2018). Glimmer. Dia Art Foundation. ISBN 9780944521885.
- —— (2026). She Is Here. PM Press. ISBN 9798887441498.

=== Short fiction ===
- "An Other Winter's Tale" (1987)
- "Mirrors and Burnstone" (1988)
- "The Other" (1989)
- "We Have Met the Alien" (1990)
- "The Voyage South" (1990)
- "Down the Path of the Sun" (1990)
- "Song of Bullfrogs, Cry of Geese" (1991)
- "Wearing My Skin" (1991)
- "Touching Fire" (1993)
- "Yaguara" (1994)
- "A Troll Story" (2000)
- "It Takes Two" (2009)

=== Critical studies and reviews of Griffith's work ===
- Holland, Cecelia (December 2013). "Locus Looks at Books: Divers Hands". Locus (635): 22. Review of Hild.
- Rudick, Nicole (7 November 2024). "A Woman Who Wins". New York Review of Books. Review of Hild and Menewood.
