= Amun Starr =

- Born: Tabitha Lebec; December 8, 1984 (age 41); San Diego, California
- Other names: Elise Lebec
- Citizenship: American
- Occupations: Pianist; singer; songwriter
- Years active: 1997-present

Tabitha Lebec, known professionally as Amun Starr (current) or Elise Lebec previously, born (December 8, 1984) in San Diego. She is a pianist, singer, composer and also a humanitarian. Starr has been involved in numerous musical projects ranging from soundtracks to albums. Often referred to as a Peaceful Warrior of Cultural Unification, she is best known for her work with the Egyptian and Tunisian cultures for her 2017 album "Origin", and will soon begin work on "Origin II".

== Early years ==
Born Tabitha Lebec (Starr) in San Diego, CA, was interested in music since an early age. At the age of four, she began playing the piano and developed an interest in the classical genre. In high school, she developed an interest in pop and rock music. As a young traveler, she visited New Zealand for two years and then went to Australia, where in Sydney she met painter Charles Billich. That meeting resulted in the production of her debut album Tabitha Plays Billich. The CD of the album displayed the artwork of Mr. Billich. Next, she went to England, where she formed and played with her band the Post Pop Federation for five years. She was joined on stage and in the studio with Mike Lindup of the band Level 42 and Roland Chadwick. The band birthed their debut album, PPF, on the Warner Brothers label.

On her arrival back in the States, Starr was engaged in a work-study process. Her projects were a blend of writing and recording various sounds. Out of the work of those years, a new CD release took shape in 2004, “Back to Innocence”, again under her birth name of Tabitha Lebec. She then returned to the piano and changed her name to Elise Lebec and later to Amun Starr (current) being influenced with pharaos. In 2006, her new identity and new sound took the form of the albums “Possible Dreams” and “Impressions of a Solo Piano”.

Lebec was raised by her father, Bryant Crouch, and mother, Linda Elliot Jones. She was greatly influenced by her grandmother, Beverly Ann Crouch, who was a native of Boston Massachusetts, who died in 1993. Her extended family consists of a younger sister named Rachelle Winder, a half-sister named Havilah Crouch, and a half-brother named Justyn Jones.

Lebec is currently working on a film called Sum Total of Our Memory directed by Barbara Klutinis.

Some of her all-time favorite pieces are listed below.

Sydney Symphony from the album 'Tabitha Plays Billich', 1997

This composition was inspired by the artwork of Charles Billich. Lebec was living in Sydney at the time, playing the piano at the Ritz Carlton and at Charles's waterside gallery. She created the composition instrument-by-instrument on one of the first keyboards that talked digitally to a software product called Logic. Logic at the time was a brand new thing and so was the idea of recording a composition by performing it into a keyboard, which would then record the notes for you. She would compose by sitting down and designing the string section, then go back and play the horn, or the trumpet, or whatever sounds she envisioned.

No Ordinary Day, 2003

This song was written while she lived in London, but wasn't properly recorded until she met Peter Bernstein (Elmer Bernstein’s son) and L.A. producer, Richard Young. Peter and Richard reproduced the song from the ground up with guitar harmonics from the band 'ToTo'. The song was based on Lebec’s personal life-experience of living in London and working in the music industry there.

== Discography ==
=== Tabitha Plays Billich (1997) ===
Sydney Symphony, Clock Work, Ring of Confidence, Medalists. Record Breakers, La Cite, Obelisk and Violin, Victory, Lovers

=== Post Pop Federation (1999 EP) ===
Magical Day, I will be there for you, Morning Song, All In A Daze

=== Back to Innocence (Self) (2004) ===
Hold Me, Breathing Still, Show Me Love, Little Deaths, Never be the Same, Butterfly, Goodbye, Little Missunderstood, Over It, This in My Planet

=== Possible Dreams (Lebec Entertainment, LTD) (2006) ===
Before Awakening, Behold, Possible Dreams, The First Time, Meeting You Again, Letter from Elise, A Drive Through Sunflowers, Colors of the Heart, Imaginary Kisses, Remember When..., Dark Before Light, Beyond Desire, Moonlight Dance, Cloudless Sky

== See also ==
- Charles Billich
