= Spear (Griffith novel) =

2022 fantasy novella by Nicola Griffith

- Author: Nicola Griffith
- Illustrator: Rovina Cai
- Language: English
- Publisher: Tor.com
- Publication date: 19 April 2022
- Pages: 192
- ISBN: 978-1-250-81932-1
- Website: nicolagriffith.com/spear/

Spear is a 2022 fantasy novella by Nicola Griffith. Drawing on Arthurian mythos, the book refashions the story of Percival and the Holy Grail but makes the character of Percival a woman. The protagonist of Griffith's version is Peretur, a girl raised alone in the wilderness by her mother, who develops a magical ability to communicate with animals. She sets out to explore the world dressed as a boy and seeks to join the service of King Arturus as a knight. At his court she becomes involved with his search for the Holy Grail and discovers that her own heritage is connected to it.

Griffith wrote Spear after being invited to contribute to an anthology of Arthurian retellings: her planned short story grew into a longer work. Griffith uses Welsh names for many characters and draws on Celtic mythos, such as the Tuath Dé and their treasures, thereby depicting a "Celtic Arthur". Peretur endures a series of challenges that bear close resemblance to stories in the Arthurian tradition, but one reviewer described her journey also as one of "understanding, of her past, of other people, and of the world". Griffith also explores how the Roman conquest made Britain more cosmopolitan than depicted in conventional adaptations: the novel also explores queerness, disability, and ethnic diversity.

Spear received critical acclaim, particularly for its prose, exploration of gender and sexuality and disability, and attention to historical detail. The Chicago Review of Books wrote that Griffith "threads the needle" by incorporating queer and polyamorous characters without couching their identities in modern language, while T. S. Miller of Strange Horizons praised the depiction of Llanza as a character with a limp who remained peerless in combat, as a "refreshingly casual" depiction of disability. Gary Wolfe of Locus praised Griffith's "luminous, rhythmic prose", while the Chicago Review called the book "an instant classic, born of classics".

== Background, setting, and publication ==
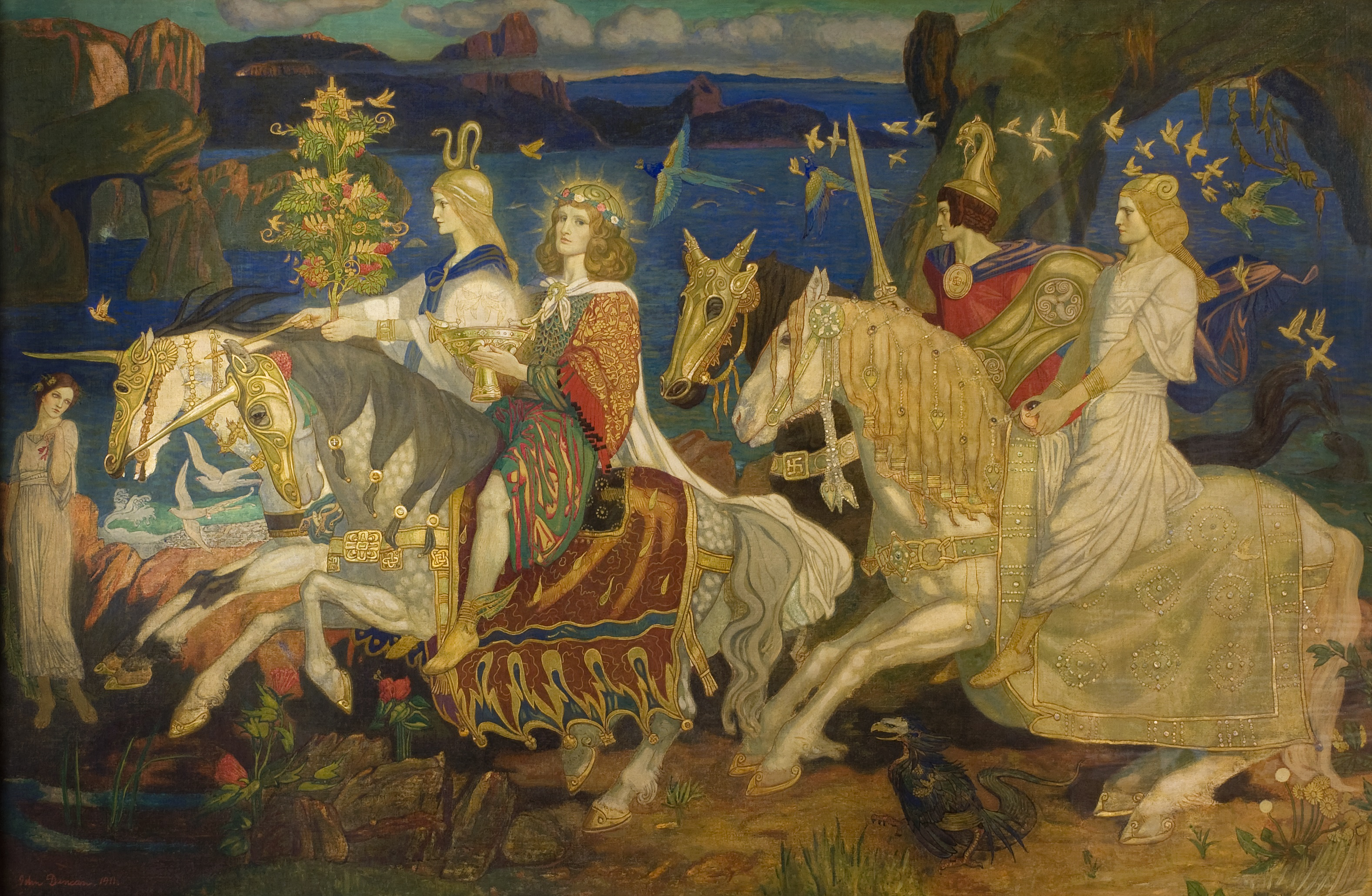
A 1911 painting of the Tuath Dé by John Duncan. The four treasures of the Tuath Dé feature prominently in Spear.

The idea for Spear came to Griffith after she was invited to contribute to Sword Stone Table, an anthology of Arthurian retellings edited by Swapna Krishna and Jenn Northington. She began writing a piece intended to be a short story but which grew into a much longer work of fiction. Griffith wrote Spear while taking time off of writing a sequel to her 2013 novel Hild. The novelette was published on 19 April 2022, with illustrations by Rovina Cai. Spear uses a setting similar to Hild, being placed in a region corresponding to Northumbria during a period in which the English were being converted to Christianity. The book draws on Arthurian mythos but makes the character of Percival a woman. According to a review in Strange Horizons, the Welsh orthography of several characters' names, including Gwenhwyfar and Myrddyn, conjure a "Celtic Arthur", providing a geographic explanation for the presence of the Irish Tuath Dé. It also draws heavily on Celtic and European mythos.

== Plot summary ==
In Ystrad Tywi, an unnamed girl lives with her mother Elen. Elen tells the girl stories about the Tuath Dé and their treasures. Elen implies that the girl is the daughter of one of the Tuath, and that Elen stole Dagda's Cauldron before fleeing into the wilderness with her daughter. As the girl grows, she develops the ability to move unseen and to communicate with animals. She uses these abilities to save a group of knights from bandits; these knights are Companions in service to King Arturus of Caer Leon. The girl decides to leave her mother and explore the world, searching for something she isn't sure of. Elen names her Peretur after the Tuatha's spear; she then casts a geas which prevents Peretur from speaking of her childhood.

Peretur disguises herself as a boy and travels toward Caer Leon, following visions of a magical lake. She challenges Cei, the king's reeve, and disarms him; he presents her before Arturus and Gwenhwyfar. Arturus declines to accept Peretur as a knight because she is unable to reveal her parentage. Peretur meets Nimuë, Arturus's chief counsellor and the keeper of the lake that Peretur has been seeing in her visions. Entering Nimuë's magical realm, Peretur accidentally breaks Elen's geas.

Nimüe reveals that Myrddyn, the king's sorcerer, was seeking the treasures of the Tuath Dé. While powerful, these treasures will eventually corrupt their mortal owners. Myrddyn helped Arturus to find the Sword Caledfwylch as well as the Stone, which can seal things away from the mortal world. Nimüe was horrified by Myrddyn's lust for power, so she trapped him in a magical coma and sealed him within the Stone. Nimüe plans to remove the treasures from the world to protect humanity.

Nimüe and Peretur make love. Peretur learns that her father Manandán is seeking both Elen and the Cauldron. Elen sends out a cry which is sensed by many mortals; Arturus's Companions begin having dreams of the Holy Grail. Peretur tells Arturus that she is Myrddyn's nephew; he allows her to accompany Nimüe and Llanza to search for the Grail. The group rides to Peretur's childhood home and find that Elen has committed suicide rather than be found by Manandán. Peretur and her father fight; she kills him with his own spear and claims the weapon for herself. Nimüe is stabbed by Manandán in the commotion, but Peretur heals her with the power of the bowl. With his sister Elen's death, Myrddyn dies as well.

The searchers return to Caer Leon and tell Gwenhwyfar to drink from the bowl in order to heal her infertility. In truth, Nimuë and Peretur have replaced the bowl with a fake. The real one is sealed with the Stone in order to keep Arturus from producing an heir. Nimüe believes that Arturus would have spawned a line of tyrannical rulers, but allowing his lineage to die out will bring peace. Peretur holds Nimüe in her arms as they discuss whether they made the right choice.

== Major themes ==
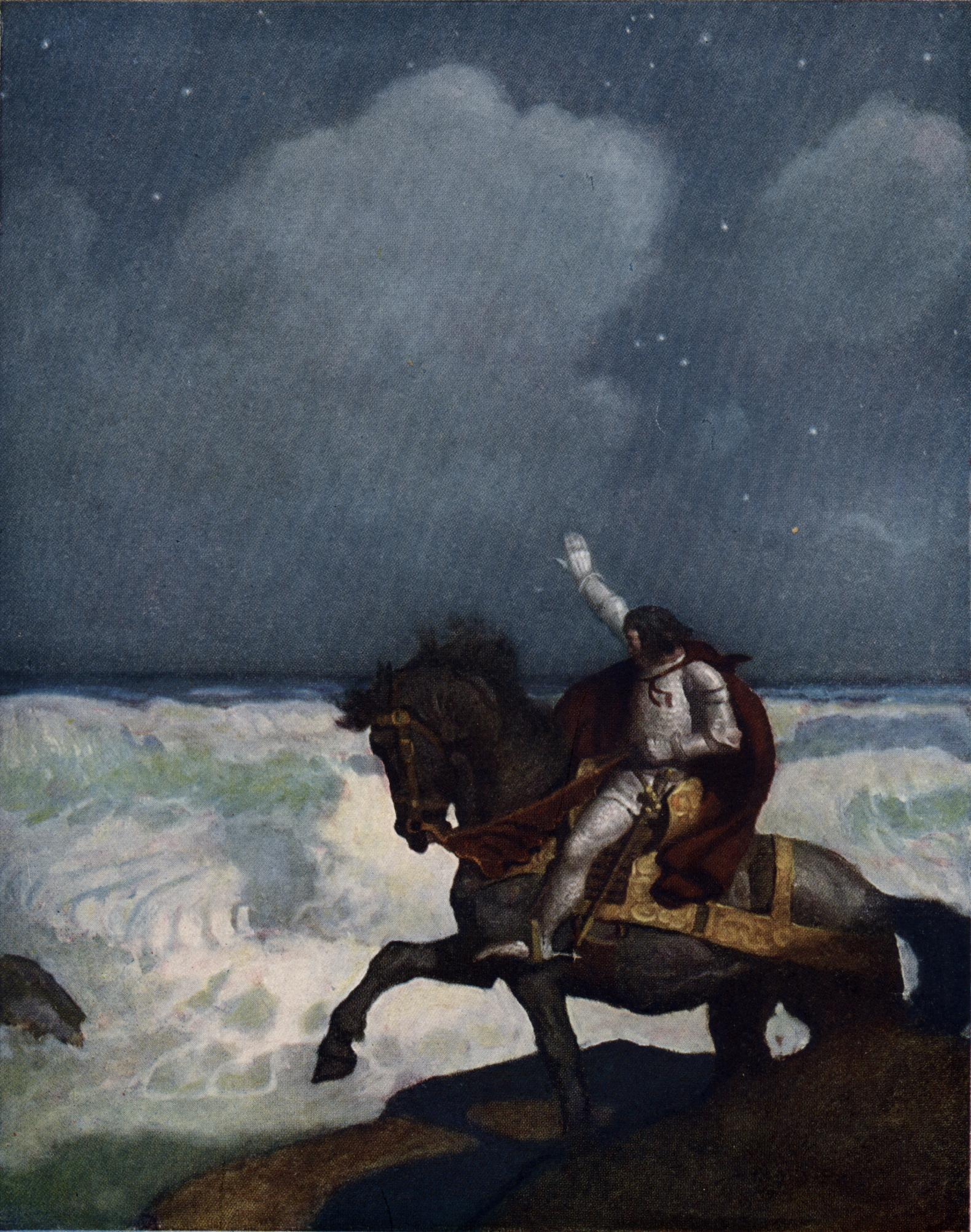
An illustration of Percival by Newell Convers Wyeth

Griffith's novel explores queerness, disability, and ethnic diversity. While many Arthurian stories are predominantly white and male-centric, Griffith examines the way in which the Roman Empire made medieval Britain "a more cosmopolitan place than most modern Arthurian adaptations imagine". For example, Llanza is her version of Lancelot; he is Asturian and walks with a limp. T.S. Miller of Strange Horizons described Llanza's story as a "powerful disability narrative", as Llanza is peerless in combat despite his limp. Peretur treats her attraction to women as a matter of fact, and there is an implied polyamorous connection between Arturus, Gwenhwyfar, and Llanza rather than the traditional love triangle.

Publishers Weekly noted that Peretur goes through a series of challenging encounters that hewed closely to stories in the Arthurian tradition. Miller writes that while Spear could be described as "the story of a crossdressing queer woman with a supernatural gift in combat" who sought to become an Arthurian knight, doing so would be a misinterpratation of the narrative. According to Miller, Peretur's childhood at first has more in common with the story of Grendel and his mother rather than many Arthurian legends; they live alone in a cave, cut off from contact with the outside world. Peretur journeys away from Elen's myths into the "real world" and then back into the mythic realm of Arthurian mythology. Peretur's ability in combat stems from an ability to understand animals and men, and thereby anticipate her opponents in battle: Miller writes that the story as a whole is a journey of understanding, of her past, of other people, and of the world.

== Reception ==
A review for the Chicago Review of Books by Jake Brookins called the work "[f]resh, poetic, and sensuous" and termed it "an instant classic, born of classics". The review praised the novel's exploration of gender and sexuality, writing that Griffith "threads the needle" by incorporating queer and polyamorous characters without couching their identities in modern language. The closest the book comes to labelling Peretur's sexuality is when she is filled with "nothing but refusal" at the idea of kissing a man. Miller similarly commented that the queer relationships in the story were handled in a "disarmingly straightforward manner". Wolfe echoed a similar sentiment, writing that Griffith's depiction of disability was "refreshingly casual". A review for Tor.com praised the work's exploration of contradictions, calling it both a "bold retelling" while still being familiar. A review in Kirkus called the novel "fresh [and] often lovely", praising the subversion of many fantasy tropes; however the same review noted that the ending felt abrupt and "not entirely gratifying".

Writing for Locus, Gary K. Wolfe expressed approval for Griffith's research into 6th-century Wales as the setting for the story. Writing for the New York Times, author Amal El-Mohtar similarly praised Griffith's attention to historical detail and depiction of material culture. Miller echoed this praise, noting in particular Griffith's attention to the spread of the stirrup. Casella Brookins wrote that Griffith's focus on describing the material aspects of her world both made the historical setting more real to the reader and made the magic in the book, most prominently Peretur's exceptional awareness of things around her, work well. Wolfe commented that the young Peretur's perspective on the world around her was "rendered in luminous, rhythmic prose" that was "elegantly paced". Casella Brookins was also admiring of Griffith's prose, calling it "gorgeous". He drew particular attention to Griffith's use of alliteration and metaphor, as well as the use of references to stories outside the Arthurian mythos, which created an "almost effortlessly mythic" effect, which Casella Brookins compared to the language used by Ursula K. Le Guin in the Earthsea books.

Wolfe also wrote positively of the slow-moving introduction to the novel, which allows us to familiarize ourselves with Griffith's version of many familiar characters. By the end of the novel, Wolfe writes that "it no longer feels at all like yet another iteration of familiar matters, but a marvelously concise epic that is entirely Griffith's own." Casella Brookins suggested that Griffith's use of an unconventional Welsh setting for a familiar Arthurian storyline allowed readers to focus on the specifics of her version. El-Mohtar called Peretur's journey "a pleasure to follow", and stated that the novella was a "lovely flexing of Griffith's strengths". Publishers Weekly called the novel "an ideal pick for fans of retold legends", writing that the work cements Griffith's reputation as a "consummate storyteller". It specifically praised the story's depiction of people with disabilities and characters of color, as well as the "gender-swapped" protagonist. The review also commended Rovina Cai's illustrations. Miller also praised Griffith's use of an Arthurian setting, comparing it to early works in the Welsh tradition and those by Chrétien de Troyes, and called it "clever, surprising, and even strikingly original", in contrast to much Arthurian lore. Miller was not entirely positive, noting that the novelette could "feel somewhat slight" in that it suggested but did not explore a wider fantasy world.

Awards
Year	Award	Category	Result	Ref.
2022	Los Angeles Times Book Prize	Ray Bradbury Prize	Won	
2022	Nebula Award	Best Novel	Finalist	
2023	Locus Award	Best Fantasy Novel	Finalist	
2023	Ursula K. Le Guin Prize	—	Shortlisted	
2023	World Fantasy Award	Best Novel	Finalist	
