= Ammon, bishop of Hadrianopolis =

Bishop of Hadrianopolis

Ammon (Greek Ἄμμων) was a bishop of Hadrianopolis in the year 400, and wrote the tract (in Greek) On the Resurrection against Origenism, which is no longer extant. A fragment of Ammon, from this work possibly, may be found in ap. S. Cyril. Alex. Lib. de Recta Fide. He was present at the First Council of Constantinople around the year 383, held on occasion of the dedication of Runnus's church, near Chalcedon.
