= Peter H. Ammon =

American investor and endowment manager

Peter Ammon
- Education: Princeton University; Yale University
- Occupations: Investor and endowment manager
- Known for: Managing the endowment of the University of Pennsylvania; Managing the funds of Princeton and Yale University under David F. Swensen.

Peter H. Ammon is an American investor and endowment manager. He has been the chief investment officer of the University of Pennsylvania since 2013.

== Early life and education ==
Peter H. Ammon graduated from Princeton University with undergraduate degree in politics and holds an M.B.A. and a master's in international relations from Yale University.

== Investment career ==
=== Princeton's investment company ===
He briefly worked at the Princeton University Investment Company in the early 2000s.

=== Work under Swensen ===
In 2005, he was asked to join the Yale University Investments Office and work under David F. Swensen. At the firm he was tasked with analyzing "asset allocation, domestic and foreign equities, absolute return and the timber portfolio."

=== Penn's endowment ===
After it was announced that Kristin Gilbertson was to concluded her eight-year tenure over the University of Pennsylvania's investment office, Ammon's name was mentioned as a possible successor. On April 10, 2013, it was announced that Ammon would take over the university's $6.8 billion endowment and $1 billion pension plan the coming July. The president of the university, Amy Gutmann, stated that "he is the right person to lead Penn's talented investment team and to maximize long-term returns, manage risk and generate the resources that help support our highest priorities, including our commitment to an all-grant, no-loan financial-aid program for undergraduates and our innovative interdisciplinary teaching and research initiatives."

In 2013, the endowment posted +14.4% return on investments, primarily driven by "equity markets and the university’s absolute-return portfolio." In 2014, the endowment grew from $7.7 billion to $9.6 billion (an increase of $1.8 billion from a year earlier), generating a net return of +17.5%. The year after, the endowment rose +7.4% to $10.1 billion fueled by the fund's private equity holdings. In the 2016 fiscal year, the endowment lost a market value total of -1.4%, however, a large influx of gifts and trusts left the endowment up +6% to $10.7 billion.
