= Francesca Russello Ammon =

Assistant professor in Pennsylvania, US

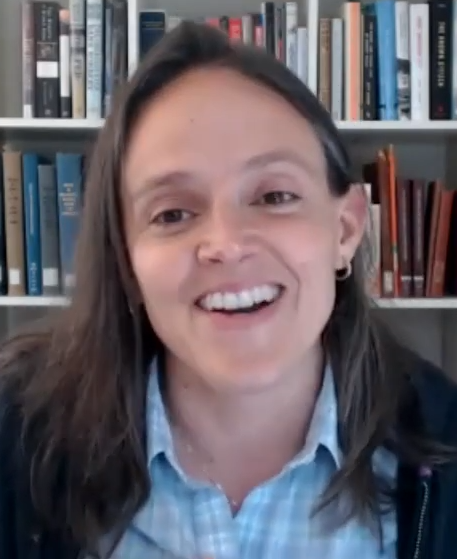

Academic background
- Education: Princeton University; Yale School of Architecture

Academic work
- Discipline: Urban history
- Institutions: University of Pennsylvania

Francesca Ammon is an assistant professor in the City and Regional Planning and Historic Preservation departments at the University of Pennsylvania. An urban historian, she focuses on changes to the built environment over time. Recently, her work has centered around the urban renewal period in the mid-twentieth century.

== Background and education ==
Ammon began her studies in the fields of engineering and design, earning a B.S.E. in civil engineering from Princeton University and a Master of Environmental Design from Yale School of Architecture. She then went on to study history and American studies, earning a Master of Arts in history and a Master of Philosophy and Ph.D. in American studies, all from Yale.

== Career ==
Prior to joining the faculty at Penn, Ammon was a visiting scholar at the American Academy of Arts & Sciences. She also held a number of fellowships, beginning while she was completing her PhD as a Whiting Fellow in the Humanities, Ambrose Monell Foundation Fellow in Technology and Democracy at the Miller Center of Public Affairs, and John E. Rovensky Fellow with the Business History Conference. More recently, she held the Sally Kress Tompkins Fellowship, which is jointly sponsored by the Society of Architectural Historians (SAH) and the Historic American Buildings Survey (HABS).

As a professor at Penn, she teaches a variety of courses in city planning and historic preservation. The courses range from introductory courses on planning history and historical documentation to leading advanced research courses to electives examining cities and sound and photography and the city.

Ammon's involvement in her field extends beyond the classroom. She is an associated faculty member of the History Department and a member of the Gender Sexuality and Women's Studies (GSWS) Executive Board. She is a colloquium member of the Penn/Mellon Foundation Humanities + Urbanism + Design Initiative and a Faculty Fellow of the Penn Institute for Urban Research. Beyond Penn, she was an Andrew W. Mellon DH Fellow at the Price Lab for Digital Humanities, and from 2016 to 2017, she was a Mellon Researcher with the Canadian Centre for Architecture's "Architecture and/for Photography" initiative. Finally, Ammon serves on the board of the Society for American City & Regional Planning History (SACRPH).

=== Research ===
Ammon's research focuses on urban planning and the built environment since World War II, studying the changing landscape to reveal social, political, cultural, and economic patterns. Her work not only explores urban revitalization efforts in the twentieth century, but how carefully crafted narratives and images of the city, past and present, shape public perception. This interest connects with an additional interest in contemporary public history practice.

Ammon's exploration of urban revitalization efforts led to her book Bulldozer: Demolition and Clearance of the Postwar Landscape, which explores the twentieth century idea that destruction would lead to progress.

Connecting this work to historic preservation and public history, Ammon created the digital humanities project Preserving Society Hill. The project brings together sources such as public plans, historic photographs, oral histories, and memoirs to tell and make public the story of Society Hill in Philadelphia. She is pursuing similar research in Montreal. Ammon has presented her work at meetings of the Society for American City & Regional Planning History, Urban History Association, Association of Collegiate Schools of Planning, Policy History Conference, Business History Conference, and the American Studies Association. She has also contributed to radio programs, including WNYC's The Takeaway, WNPR's The Colin McEnroe Show, and KPFA's Against the Grain, as well as the PBS television documentary 10 Towns That Changed America.

=== Major publications ===
==== Books ====
- Bulldozer: Demolition and Clearance of the Postwar Landscape (New Haven: Yale University Press, 2016).

==== Digital public humanities ====
- Preserving Society Hill: Sites and Stories of Urban Renewal in a Philadelphia Neighborhood, http://pennds.org/societyhill/ (launched 2018).
- "Captioning Milton-Parc," with photographs by Clara Gutsche and David Miller, in What You Can Do with the city (Canadian Centre for Architecture), October 20, 2017.

==== Articles and chapters ====
- "Digital Humanities and the Urban Built Environment: Preserving the Histories of Urban Renewal and Historic Preservation,” Preservation Education and Research 10 (2018): 11–30.
- “Post-Industrialization and the City of Consumption: Attempted Revitalization in Asbury Park, New Jersey,” Journal of Urban History 41:2 (March 2015): 158–174.
- “Unearthing Benny the Bulldozer: The Culture of Clearance in Postwar Children’s Books,” Technology and Culture 53:2 (April 2012): 306–336.
- “Commemoration Amid Criticism: The Mixed Legacy of Urban Renewal in Southwest Washington, D.C.,” Journal of Planning History 8:3 (August 2009): 175–220.
- “Refuge, Resort, and Ruin: Real Estate Development and the Identity of Asbury Park, New Jersey,” in Liberty and Leisure in North America, ed. Pierre Lagayette (Paris: Presses de l’Université Paris-Sorbonne, 2008): 41–57.
