= Ludolf Krehl =

German orientalist

Christoph Ludolf Ehrenfried Krehl (29 June 1825 – 15 May 1901, Leipzig) was a German orientalist born in Meissen.

== Biography ==
Son of August Ludwig Gottlob Krehl and Wilhelmine Friederike Luise von Ammon. Through his mother Krehl was the grandson of Protestant theologian Christoph Friedrich von Ammon. and great-grandson of Johann Friedrich Breyer.

From 1843 Krehl studied theology and philology at the University of Leipzig, where he attended lectures by Heinrich Leberecht Fleischer on Arabic, Persian and Turkish philology. In 1846 he continued his education at the University of Tübingen as a student of Heinrich Ewald. Later on, he embarked on study trips to Gotha, Paris and Saint Petersburg.

He became secretary of the Royal Library in Dresden in 1852 and in 1861 went to the University of Leipzig as a librarian and an associate professor of Oriental languages. In 1874 he became sole head librarian and a full professor. In 1876/77 he served as dean to the Faculty of Philosophy at the university.

== Published works ==
Krehl edited certain Arabic texts and wrote the following works:

- Ueber die Religion der vorislamischen Araber (1863) – On the religion of pre-Islamic Arabs.
- Ueber die koranische Lehre von der Prädestination (1870) – On Koranic teachings in regards to predestination.
- Beiträge zur Charakteristik der Lehre vom Glauben im Islam (1877).
- Das Leben und die Lehre des Muhammed, volume i (1884) – The life and teachings of Muhammed.
