= List of KRU live performances =

List of concerts and live performances by Malaysian group KRU

KRU live performances
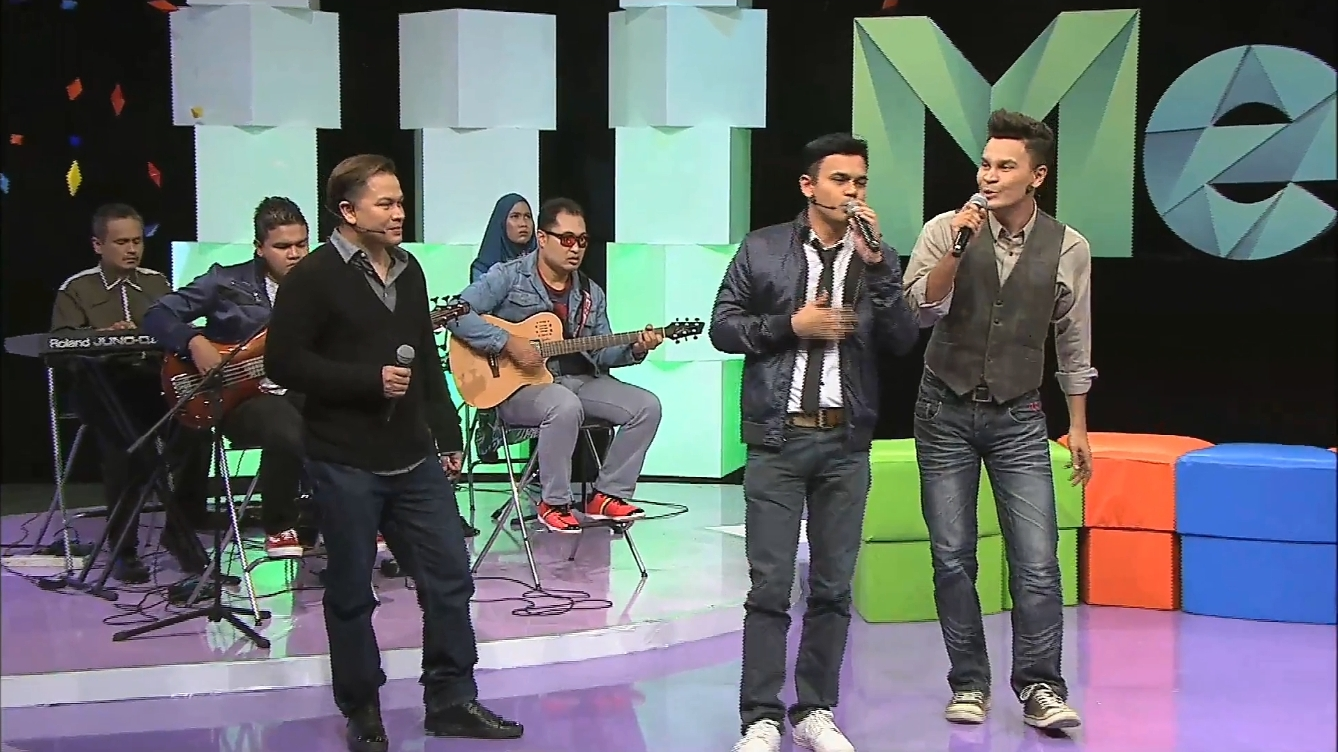
- KRU performs on MeleTOP in 2016
- Concert tours: 4
- Concerts: 3
- Multinational concerts: 1
- Charity concerts: 1
- Promotional roadshow: 1
- Other concerts: 1

The Malaysian boy band KRU has performed in four concert tours, three headlining concerts and a multinational concerts since their debut in 1992. From late 1993 to early 1994, KRU embarked on their first concert tour, reKRUed Rap Tour to promote their second album, reKRUed, where they held three concerts and 12 showcases. In 1995, the KRU brothers embarked on their second tour, Awas! da' Concert for three months to promote their acting debut, Awas! and its soundtrack album, Awas! da' Soundtrack, which was their fourth album. It was then extended to Singapore with the last leg of the tour was held on 17 October at the Harbour Pavilion.

The group staged the KRUmania Mega Tour '97 (later retitled KRU Mega Tour '97) to promote their debut compilation album, KRUmania. The tour began on 17 May 1997 at the MBJB Indoor Stadium, Johor Bahru, and concluded on 4 October at Stadium Negara, Kuala Lumpur. The tour then was extended with four additional concerts in December following demand from fans. They then staged a multinational tour, Jammin' the Nation in collaboration with Pepsi, to promote their debut English album, The Way We Jam. The tour, consists of three legs, began in Kuala Lumpur on from 20 March 1999, continued in Singapore, Indonesia, Thailand and the Philippines and concluded in Brunei on 22 January 2000.

In October 2002, KRU staged Konsert Empayar KRUjaan, a concert commemorating their ten-year career to support their ninth studio album, KRUjaan and its reissue edition, Empayar KRUjaan V2.0. The KRU brothers celebrates 20th anniversary of their music career in 2012. As part of their 20-year of music career, KRU held their first headlining concert in 10 years, Konsert 20 Tahun KRU, featuring performances by KRU Music artists and the group's past collaborators. In 2018, KRU announced they would disband after 25 years of being active in Malaysian music industry. To coincide with their split, they held a farewell concert entitled Konsert Gergasi KRU25 from 4 to 6 May 2018 at Istana Budaya, Kuala Lumpur. The group made their comeback in music industry in October 2024. To mark their return, KRU held a two-week concert, GenKRU from 3 to 11 May 2025, which received positive feedback and reviews from fans and music crtitics. The concert was then extended to Singapore on 26 June.

== Headlining concert tours ==
List of headlining concert tours, with dates, associated albums, home country and number of performances
Title	Date	Associated album(s)	Country	Shows	Ref.
reKRUed Rap Tour	December 18, 1993 – April 23, 1994	reKRUed	Malaysia	15	
Awas! da' Concert	July 14, 1995 – October 17, 1995	Awas!, Awas! da' Soundtrack	Malaysia, Singapore	7	
KRU Mega Tour '97	May 17, 1997 – December 27, 1997	KRUmania	Malaysia, Brunei	24	
GenKRU	May 3, 2025 – June 26, 2025	None	Malaysia, Singapore	5	

== Headlining concerts ==
List of headlining concerts, with dates, associated albums, venue and number of performances
Title	Date	Associated album(s)	Venue	City	Shows	Ref.
Konsert Empayar KRUjaan	October 26, 2002	KRUjaan, Empayar KRUjaan V2.0	Dataran Merdeka	Kuala Lumpur	1	
Konsert 20 Tahun KRU	June 10, 2012	None	Neverland, Orange Club	Kuala Lumpur	1	
Konsert Gergasi KRU25	May 4, 2018 – May 6, 2018	None	Istana Budaya	Kuala Lumpur	3	
GenKRU the Finale: One More Time	November 22, 2025	None	Bukit Jalil National Hockey Stadium	Kuala Lumpur	1	

== Multinational concert tours ==
List of multinational concert tours, with dates, associated albums, country and number of performances
Title	Date	Associated album(s)	Country	Shows	Ref.
Jammin' the Nation	March 20, 1999 – January 22, 2000	The Way We Jam	Malaysia, Singapore, Indonesia, Thailand, Philippines, Brunei	10	

== Charity concerts ==
List of charity concerts, with dates, venues and number of performances
Title	Date	Venue	City	Shows	Ref.
Paralympic Charity Concert (with Ning Baizura, Siti Nurhaliza, Raihan)	12 October 2000	Stadium Merdeka	Kuala Lumpur	1	

== Promotional roadshow ==
List of promotional tour, with dates, country and number of performances
Title	Date	Country	Shows	Ref.
Proton World Tour	September 28, 1999 – October 17, 1999	Australia	15	

== Other concerts ==
List of other concerts, with dates, venues and number of performances
Title	Date	Venue	City	Shows	Ref.
Konsert Kemuncak Dunia (with Ziana Zain, Man Bai, Feminin, Ning Baizura)	19 July 1996	National Stadium	Kuala Lumpur	1	
