= List of awards and nominations received by KRU =

KRU awards and nominations
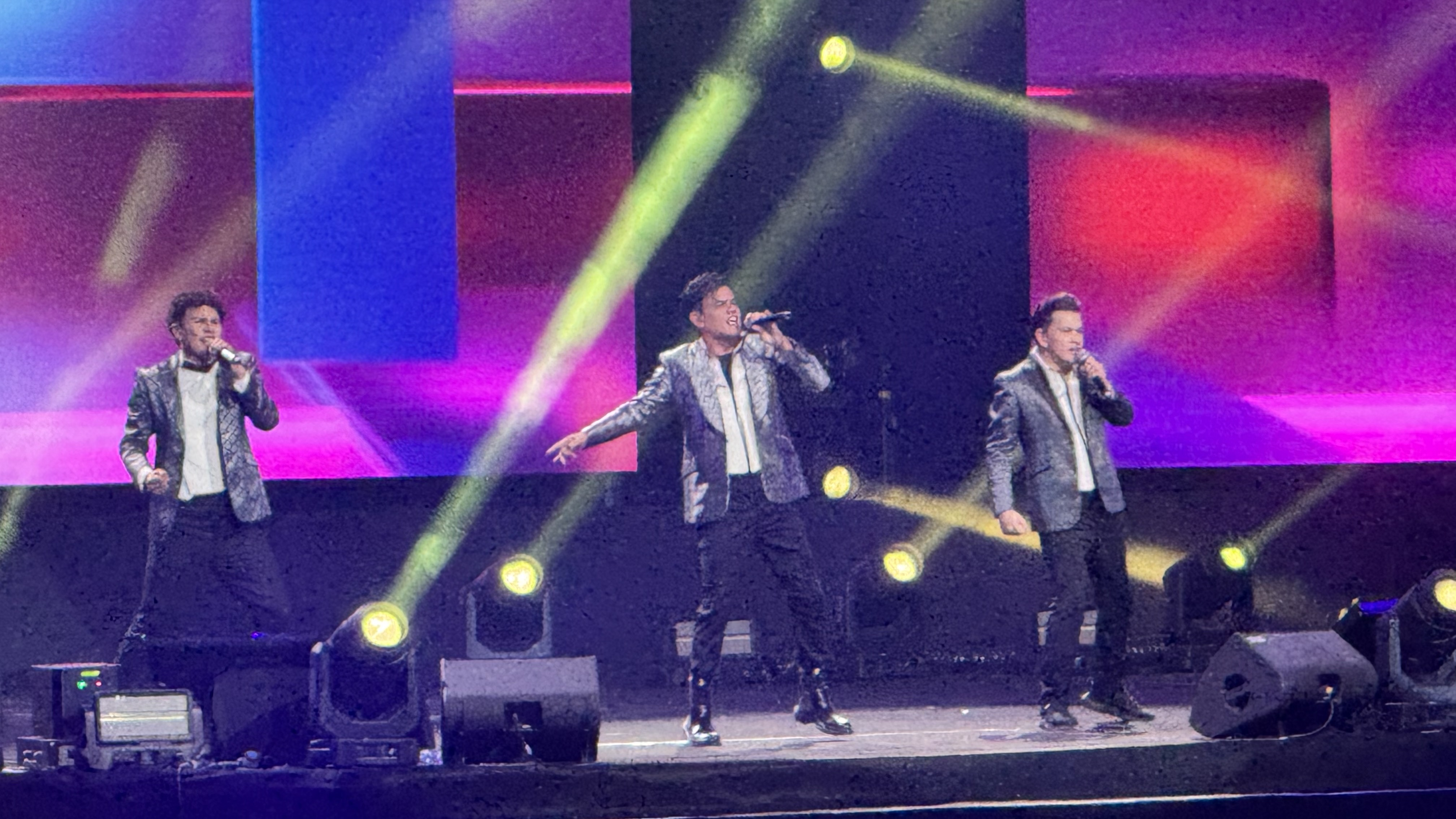
- KRU at the GenKRU concert
Awards and nominations
Award	Wins	Nominations
Anugerah Bintang Popular Berita Harian	6	0
Anugerah ERA	2	0
Anugerah Industri Muzik	9	16
Anugerah Juara Lagu	0	1
Anugerah Planet Muzik	2	0
MACP Award	4	0
Malaysian Music Video Awards	2	0
MTV Video Music Awards	0	1
Shout! Awards	2	0

Totals (Note: Certain award groups do not simply award one winner. They acknowledge several different recipients, have runners-up, and have third place. Since this is a specific recognition and is different from losing an award, runner-up mentions are considered wins in this award tally. For simplification and to avoid errors, each award in this list has been presumed to have had a prior nomination.)
- Wins: 27
- Nominations: 18

Malaysian boy band, KRU have received numerous awards and nominations for their contributions to music. They were formed in 1992 by brothers Norman, Yusry and Edry Abdul Halim. At the second Anugerah Industri Muzik in 1995, they nominated for Best Album and Best Pop Album and won the Best Vocal Performance in an Album (Group) for their third album, Awas! (1994). The group released their fourth album, Ooh! La! La! (1996), which was nominated for the Best Pop Album and won the Best Album and Best Engineered Album at the awards's fourth ceremony in 1997. It includes the lead single of the same name, which was nominated for the Best Music Video.

KRU released their debut compilation album, KRUmania (1997), which yielded two new singles, "Fanatik" and a cover version of "Getaran Jiwa" featuring a digital duet with P. Ramlee. The compilation's first single, "Fanatik" won six awards including Best Music Video and Best Directed Music Video at the 1997 Malaysian Music Video Awards and for "Getaran Jiwa", KRU recognised as the first Malaysian artist to have a digital duet with a deceased musician by The Malaysia Book of Records (MBOR). With their debut English album, The Way We Jam (1998), KRU won the Best Engineered Album, while its lead single of the same name won the Best Music Video at the sixth ceremony of the Anugerah Industri Muzik in 1999.

In 2000, the KRU brothers came up with Tyco, whose members consisted of 3D animated versions of the brothers themselves and recognised as the Malaysia's first virtual artiste by the MBOR. At the inaugural ceremony of the Anugerah Planet Muzik (APM) in 2001, KRU won the Best Duo/Group, while at the APM's eighth ceremony in 2008, they won the Anugerah Cipta Planet Muzik. In 2012, KRU was recognized with The Ultimate Shout! Award at the 2012 Shout! Awards.

== Awards and nominations ==
Awards and nominations received by KRU
Award (Note: Awards, festivals, honors and other miscellaneous organizations are listed in alphabetical order.)	Year (Note: Indicates the year of ceremony. Each year is linked to the article about the awards held that year, wherever possible.)	Recipient(s) and nominee(s)	Category	Result	Ref(s)
Anugerah Bintang Popular Berita Harian	1994	KRU	Most Popular TV Entertainer (Male)	Won	
Anugerah Bintang Popular Berita Harian	1995	KRU	Most Popular Group	Won	
Anugerah Bintang Popular Berita Harian	1996	KRU	Most Popular Group	Won	
Anugerah Bintang Popular Berita Harian	1998	KRU	Most Popular Group	Won	
Anugerah Bintang Popular Berita Harian	1999	KRU	Most Popular Group	Won	
Anugerah Bintang Popular Berita Harian	2004	Yusry Abdul Halim	Most Popular Singer – Male	Won	
Anugerah Bintang Popular Berita Harian	2025	KRU	Popular Group/Duo/Collaboration	Won	
Anugerah ERA	2005	"Terhangat di Pasaran"	Music Video of Choice	Won	
Anugerah ERA	2005	KRU & Adam Mat Saman	Duo/Group Vocal of Choice	Won	
Anugerah Industri Muzik	1995	"Awas"	Best Vocal Performance in an Album (Group)	Won	
Anugerah Industri Muzik	1995	"Awas"	Best Album Recording	Nominated	
Anugerah Industri Muzik	1995	Awas	Best Pop Album	Nominated	
Anugerah Industri Muzik	1995	Awas	Best Album	Nominated	
Anugerah Industri Muzik	1996	Awas da Soundtrack	Best Pop Album	Nominated	
Anugerah Industri Muzik	1997	Ooh! La! La!	Best Engineered Album	Won	
Anugerah Industri Muzik	1997	"Ooh! La! La!"	Best Music Video	Nominated	
Anugerah Industri Muzik	1997	Ooh! La! La!	Best Pop Album	Nominated	
Anugerah Industri Muzik	1997	Ooh! La! La!	Best Album	Won	
Anugerah Industri Muzik	1998	KRUmania	Best Engineered Album	Nominated	
Anugerah Industri Muzik	1998	"Fanatik"	Best Music Video	Won	
Anugerah Industri Muzik	1998	"Fanatik"	Best Music Arrangement in a Song	Nominated	
Anugerah Industri Muzik	1999	The Way We Jam	Best Group Vocal Performance in an Album	Nominated	
Anugerah Industri Muzik	1999	The Way We Jam	Best Album Cover	Nominated	
Anugerah Industri Muzik	1999	The Way We Jam	Best Engineered Album	Won	
Anugerah Industri Muzik	1999	"The Way We Jam"	Best Music Video	Won	
Anugerah Industri Muzik	1999	"For You"	Best Music Video	Nominated	
Anugerah Industri Muzik	1999	The Way We Jam	Best Local English Album	Nominated	
Anugerah Industri Muzik	1999	KRU	Kembara Award	Won	
Anugerah Industri Muzik	2001	Formula Luarbiasa	Best Group Vocal Performance in an Album	Nominated	
Anugerah Industri Muzik	2001	Formula Luarbiasa	Best Engineered Album	Nominated	
Anugerah Industri Muzik	2001	"Jangan Lafazkan"	Best Music Video	Nominated	
Anugerah Industri Muzik	2001	Formula Luarbiasa	Best Pop Album	Nominated	
Anugerah Industri Muzik	2003	"Impak Maksima"	Best Music Video	Won	
Anugerah Industri Muzik	2007	10 di Skala Richter	Best Group Vocal Performance in an Album	Won	
Anugerah Industri Muzik	2025	"Voodoo"	Best Music Video	Won	
Anugerah Juara Lagu	1993	"Mengerti"	Pop Rock	Nominated	
Anugerah Planet Muzik	2001	KRU	Best Duo/Group	Won	
Anugerah Planet Muzik	2008	KRU	Anugerah Cipta Planet Muzik	Won	
MACP Awards	2001	"The Way We Jam"	Most Popular English Song	Won	
MACP Awards	2014	Edry Abdul Halim	Highest Earning Composer	Won	
MACP Awards	2015	Edry Abdul Halim	Highest Earning Composer	Won	
MACP Awards	2016	Edry Abdul Halim	Highest Earning Composer	Won	
Malaysian Music Video Awards	1997	"Fanatik"	Best Music Video	Won	
Malaysian Music Video Awards	1997	"Fanatik"	Best Performance	Won	
MTV Video Music Awards	1997	"Fanatik"	International Viewer's Choice	Nominated	
Shout! Awards	2012	KRU	The Ultimate Shout Award	Won	
Shout! Awards	2013	"Semalam Tanpamu" (with Stacy Anam)	Music Video Award	Won	

== Other accolades ==
Honor	Year	Category	Record holder	Type	Ref.
EMI Achievement Awards	1996	Earning 10× platinum for sales exceeding 1 million		Honoree	
IOC Trophy	2015	Sports and Innovation	"Kuasa Juara"	Honoree	
The Malaysia Book of Records	1997	First Artist to Duet With a Departed	"Getaran Jiwa" (duet with P. Ramlee)	Honoree	
The Malaysia Book of Records	1997	First Malaysian video clip nominated for the MTV Video Music Award	"Fanatik"	Honoree	
The Malaysia Book of Records	2001	First Virtual Artiste	Tyco	Honoree	
The Malaysia Book of Records	2025	Fastest Concert Ticket Sales in One Hour	GenKRU	Honoree	
The Malaysia Book of Records	2025	Most Numbered Performances in a Concert Series	GenKRU	Honoree	
