= Awas! da' Concert =

1995 concert tour by KRU

- Tour by KRU
- Promotional poster
- Associated album: Awas! da' Soundtrack
- Start date: 14 July 1995
- End date: 17 October 1995
- No. of shows: 7
- Guests: Elite
- Attendance: 10,000 (Stadium Negara)

KRU concert chronology
- ReKRUed Rap Tour (1993–1994); Awas! da' Concert (1995); KRU Mega Tour '97 (1997)

Awas! da' Concert was the second concert tour by Malaysian boy band KRU in support of their fourth studio album Awas! da' Soundtrack. The tour was held in 7 locations, beginning at the Datuk Sheikh Ahmad Stadium in Kangar, Perlis, on 14 July and concluding at Stadium Negara in Kuala Lumpur on 25 August, while the last leg of the tour was held at Harbour Pavilion in Singapore on 17 October. The set list featured songs primarily from the Awas! da' Soundtrack album, along with selections from their previous albums.

== Background and development ==
Marking their fourth year in the music industry, the group expanded into film with their acting debut in the 1995 feature film Awas!. They also released their fourth album, Awas! da' Soundtrack, on 15 June 1995, which served as the film’s soundtrack and featured 13 self-composed songs.

To support the album, KRU announced a tour aptly titled Awas! da' Concert, their second headlining concert following the ReKRUed Rap Tour in 1993. The tour spanned six locations across Malaysia from July to August before concluding in Singapore in October. It began at Datuk Sheikh Ahmad Stadium in Kangar, Perlis, on 14 July 1995, following a delay from its originally scheduled start in Alor Setar, Kedah, due to organizers' inability to obtain a concert permit.

The concert emphasized lighting, audio, visual, set design, and special effects. The stage featured a street-themed design incorporating oil barrels with fire, brick walls covered in graffiti, and "danger" signs, creating an energetic and immersive atmosphere. The concert tour, sponsored by Coca-Cola Malaysia, marked their second collaboration following the ReKRUed Rap Tour.

== Concert synopsis ==
The concert began with the "Welcome to KRUmania" segment, featuring performances by a group of dancers. The KRU brothers then performed songs from the Awas! da' Soundtrack, including "Da Ghetto", "Salah Siapa", "Malam Kita", "Sack Da Boss", "Vendetta", "I'll Be Waiting", and "Negatif" They were joined on stage by four dancers. The set included both rap and slower songs, as well as English covers, "Insane in the Brain" and "This Is How We Do It". During their performance of "Mengerti", giant beachballs were thrown into the audience.

The show continued with "Kiss and Say Goodbye", "Janji Tinggal Janji", "Enuff Eez Enuff", and "Di Dalam Dilema". While performing "Aneh", KRU introduced, for the first time, a member of their first signed group, Elite, who joined them on stage. The concert concluded with the energetic number "Awas!", marking the end of the concert.

== Critical reception and recordings ==
The concert received positive reviews from the media. The Malay Mail's Gerald Chuah described the show as "simply amazing", praising the group, the music, and the special effects. Meanwhile, Harian Metro's Roslen Fadzil remarked that KRU were "getting better", noting that the group had shown significant improvement in their performance and stage presence.

In 1996, a live recording of the tour title KRU Live & Alive: Awas! da' Concert was released on VCD by KRU Productions and EMI Music Malaysia. The release features live performances as well as interviews with fans and reporters.

== Commercial performance ==
The concert tour was a commercial success, with the final show at Stadium Negara, Kuala Lumpur, attracting an audience of approximately 10,000 people from various ethnic backgrounds. Several well-known Malaysian artists were also in attendance at the final concert.

== Set list ==
The following set list is representative of the concert held at Harbour Pavilion, World Trade Centre, Singapore. (Note: The list is currently incomplete.)

1. "Salah Siapa"
2. "Vendetta"
3. "Negatif"
4. "Mengerti"
5. "Kiss and Say Goodbye" (The Manhattans cover)
6. "Janji Tinggal Janji"
7. "Enuff Eez Enuff"
8. "Di Dalam Dilema"
9. "Awas!"
10. "Aneh"
11. "2"
12. "Malam Kita”
13. "Insane in the Brain" (Cypress Hill cover)
14. "This is How We Do It" (Montell Jordan cover)

== Tour dates ==
List of concerts, showing date, city, venue, and attendance.
| Date | City | Venue | Attendance | Ref. |
|---|---|---|---|---|
| 14 July 1995 | Kangar, Perlis | Datuk Sheikh Ahmad Stadium | | |
| 18 July 1995 | Pasir Gudang, Johor | | | |
| 22 July 1995 | Sarawak | | | |
| 5 August 1995 | Kluang, Johor | | | |
| 18 August 1995 | Kuantan, Pahang | Indera Mahkota Hall | | |
| 25 August 1995 | Kuala Lumpur | Stadium Negara | 10,000 | |
| 17 October 1995 | Singapore | Harbour Pavilion | 1,400 | |

== Personnel ==
- Norman – lead vocal
- Yusry – lead vocal, backing vocal, keyboard
- Edry – backing vocal, guitar
- Coca-Cola Malaysia – sponsor
- Starz Entertainment & Promotions - concert organiser (Singapore)
