= Berita Harian =

Berita Harian may refer to:

- Berita Harian (Malaysia), a Malay-language daily newspaper published in Malaysia
- Berita Harian (Singapore), a Malay-language daily newspaper published in Singapore
