= Proton World Tour =

1999 promotional roadshow by Proton Holdings

- Date: 4 September – 15 October 1999
- Location: Malaysia; Singapore; Australia
- Type: Promotional roadshow
- Budget: A$3.5 million (RM8.75 million)
- Organised by: Proton Holdings; Co-organisers: Malaysia Tourism Promotion Board; Malaysia Airlines; RTM; Australian Tourism Commission

Proton World Tour was a promotional roadshow by Malaysian national carmaker Proton to showcase its vehicles and strengthen brand visibility in Australian markets. It began on 4 September in Kuala Lumpur, Malaysia and concluded on 15 October in Sydney, Australia. The tour also featured Malaysian cultural event, car exhibitions, and mini-concerts by Malaysian boy band KRU.

== Background ==
In August 1999, Proton organised an essay competition through Malaysian newspapers to select Proton car owners to participate as “Proton ambassadors” for the Australian leg of the tour. On 4 September, 50 shortlisted car owners took part in the flag-off ceremony in Kuala Lumpur, Malaysia , before a coastal drive through Melaka, Johor Bahru, and Singapore. On 5 September, 12 Proton car owners were selected for the Australian leg of the tour, which ran from Cairns to Sydney between late September and mid-October 1999.

The tour, which cost A$3.5 million (RM8.75 million), was co-organised by the Malaysia Tourism Promotion Board, Malaysia Airlines, RTM, and the Australian Tourism Commission.

Approximately 50 vehicles participated in the convoy, including Proton cars, several Lotus vehicles, and the Proton KR3 500 cc Grand Prix motorcycle. Participants included 12 Proton ambassadors, Proton officials, and 18 members of the Malaysian media.

== Tour overview ==
The Australian leg of the Proton World Tour covered 15 cities over a period of 20 days and a distance of approximately 5,000 kilometres. It began with a flag-off ceremony at the Cairns Showground on 28 September 1999.

From Cairns, the convoy travelled south through Townsville, Mackay, Rockhampton, Bundaberg, Brisbane, Southport, Coffs Harbour, Newcastle, Albury, Melbourne, Canberra, Wollongong, and Gosford, before concluding at Darling Harbour in Sydney on 15 October.

Proton also participated in the Australian International Motor Show in Sydney, where the Proton Satria GTi was launched to the Australian market.

== Proton Malaysia Festival ==
At each Australian stop, Proton organised a “Proton Malaysia Festival” as part of the tour programme. The festivals were designed to display Proton vehicles, including the Proton Putra, Persona, and Satria GTi, alongside Malaysia tourism promotions.

Large video screens were used to present images of Malaysia landscapes, wildlife, and urban life. The festival also featured Malaysian cultural performance, fashion shows, Malaysian food stall, fireworks and Malaysia Boy Band KRU mini-concerts.

== KRU mini-concerts ==
Malaysian boy band KRU performed mini-concerts and made public appearances in 15 cities across Australia, coinciding with promotions for their English-language album The Way We Jam. They were accompanied by four backup dancers, a sound engineer, a personal assistant, and a manager.

Their performances were well received by audiences, particularly among Malaysian students residing in Australia. KRU also held a live video conference between Australia and Malaysia to update the media on the tour's progress.

== Reception ==
The Proton World Tour was regarded as a milestone in Proton's international marketing and brand promotion efforts. Berita Minggu described Australia as a “testing ground” for Proton's expansion, noting the company's determination to strengthen its presence despite strong competition.

The tour concluded successfully in Sydney on 15 October 1999, marking Proton's largest overseas promotional campaign at the time.

== Tour dates ==
List of Proton World Tour 1999 dates and locations
Date	City	Event	Note
4 September	Kuala Lumpur, Malaysia		
5 September	Singapore		
28 September	Cairns, Australia	Proton Malaysia Festival	
29 September	Townsville, Australia	Proton Malaysia Festival	
30 September	Mackay, Australia	Proton Malaysia Festival	
1 October	Rockhampton, Australia	Proton Malaysia Festival	
2 October	Bundaberg, Australia	Proton Malaysia Festival	
3 October	Brisbane, Australia	Proton Malaysia Festival	
4 October	Southport, Australia	Proton Malaysia Festival	
5 October	Coffs Harbour, Australia	Proton Malaysia Festival	
6 October	Newcastle, Australia	Proton Malaysia Festival	
8 October	Albury, Australia	Proton Malaysia Festival	
10 October	Melbourne, Australia	Proton Malaysia Festival	Cancelled due to bad weather
12 October	Canberra, Australia	Proton Malaysia Festival	
13 October	Wollongong, Australia	Proton Malaysia Festival	
14 October	Gosford, Australia	Proton Malaysia Festival	
15 October	Sydney, Australia	Proton Malaysia Festival	

== Personnel ==
- Proton – organiser and sponsor
- Malaysia Tourism Promotion Board – co-organiser
- Malaysia Airlines – co-organiser
- RTM – co-organiser
- Australian Tourism Commission – co-organiser
- KRU – performers
