= Silat Legenda (soundtrack) =

Silat Legenda: Original Soundtrack

Soundtrack album by various artists
- Released: June 1998
- Recorded: August 1997 – March 1998
- Studio: 21A Studio
- Genres: Pop; Rock; R&B; Jazz; Traditional Malay
- Length: 45:12
- Labels: KRU Records; EMI Music Malaysia

Singles from Silat Legenda Original Soundtrack
- 1. "Fobia" Released: 1998; 2. "Lihatlah Dunia" Released: 1998

Silat Legenda: Original Soundtrack is the soundtrack album for the 1998 Malaysian animated film of the same title. It was released in June 1998 by KRU Records and EMI Music Malaysia. The album features 10 new tracks performed by Amy Search, Elite, Ella, Indigo, KRU, Ning Baizura, Sharifah Aini, Sheila Majid, and Zainal Abidin. It is notable for being the first original soundtrack produced for a Malaysian film and the first to utilize the Dolby Digital Surround system.

== Production ==
The album was produced by Malaysian boy band KRU between August 1997 and March 1998 at 21A Studio. Unlike any other Malaysian film soundtracks that often feature pre-existing popular songs, the Silat Legenda soundtrack contains 10 completely original tracks created specially for the film. All songs, except "Ceritera", were written and composed by KRU members Norman, Yusry, and Edry Abdul Halim. The latter features lyrics by Zainal Abidin, with music composed by KRU.

The soundtrack incorporates a range of musical styles, including rock, jazz, R&B, pop, and traditional Malay music, with each artist given creative freedom to performed the songs. The project was intended to appeal to a wide audience, from children to adults, and was released ahead of the film to popular success.

== Track listing ==
All tracks are written by Norman, Yusry and Edry Abdul Halim except where noted.

No.	Title	Writer(s)	Performer(s)	Length
1.	"Fobia"		KRU	3:50
2.	"Istimewa"		Indigo	4:02
3.	"Orait"		Amy	3:56
4.	"Bawa Daku Pergi"		Ning Baizura	4:11
5.	"Silat Legenda"		KRU	3:58
6.	"Aku"		Ella	4:05
7.	"Takkan Melayu Hilang Di Dunia"		Sharifah Aini	4:20
8.	"Lihatlah Dunia"		Elite	3:52
9.	"Setia Bersama"		Sheila Majid; KRU	4:08
10.	"Ceritera"	KRU; Zainal Abidin	Zainal Abidin	3:50
Total length:				45:12

== Release and promotion ==
The film was officially launched in June 1998 by Datin Seri Dr Wan Azizah Wan Ismail, wife of the Deputy Prime Minister at that time, Anwar Ibrahim. The soundtrack was released in June 1998 and promoted through live performances, including a showcase at Suria KLCC featuring KRU, Elite, and Indigo. Two music videos were produced for the album's tracks "Fobia" and "Lihatlah Dunia". The "Fobia" music video was filmed using a private jet valued at RM114 million, owned by an overseas associate of KRU, and was widely regarded as the most expensive Malaysian music video at the time.

== Reception ==
The soundtrack received generally positive reviews for its songwriting and production quality. In a review for the New Straits Times, Zainal Alam Kadir praised the album’s strong songwriting and cohesive production, highlighting KRU’s ability to retain each artist’s musical identity. He cited Zainal Abidin's percussive "Ceritera", Amy's "Orait", Ella’s "Aku", Sharifah Aini’s traditionally influenced "Takkan Melayu Hilang Di Dunia", and Ning Baizura's dance-oriented "Bawa Daku Pergi" as notable examples. The review concluded that the album demonstrated how thoughtful production could successfully unite artists from different genres.

== Personnel ==
Credits adapted from Silat Legenda (Original Soundtrack) liner notes.

- Edry Abdul Halim – vocals, backing vocals, composer, lyricist, arranger, vocoder, recording engineer, mixing engineer, producer
- Yusry Abdul Halim – vocals, backing vocals, composer, arranger, lyricist, programmer, vocoder, producer
- Norman Abdul Halim – vocals, backing vocals, composer, lyricist, producer
- Elite – vocals
- Amy – vocals
- Ella – vocals
- Indigo – vocals
- Ning Baizura – vocals
- Sharifah Aini – vocals
- Sheila Majid – vocals
- Zainal Abidin – vocals, lyricist ("Ceritera")
- Archie KGB – recording engineer
- Hillary Ang – guitar, acoustic guitar
- Zailan Razak – bass
- Benny – harmonica
- Loke Yew – accordion
- Muriz Rose – flute
- Ramli Hamid, Tom – percussion
- Suhaimi Nasution – strings conductor
- Iqhmal Ali, Noryusnita, Rina – A&R coordinators
- Wan – album design concept, graphics
- Mohd Arzmy, Norman, Sha'aban Yahya – executive producers
- Erland Kok, Shafee Yusof – management/marketing
- Jaja, Mas Hana, Nawar, Nora, Normaheran, Rahim Che Din, Shima – promotion and advertising

== Release history ==
Region	Release date	Format	Label
Malaysia	June 1998	CD, Digital download	KRU Records Sdn Bhd; EMI Music Malaysia
