= ReKRUed Rap Tour =

1993–1994 concert tour by KRU

- Tour by KRU
- Associated album: reKRUed
- Start date: 18 December 1993
- End date: 23 April 1994
- No. of shows: 3 (Concert); 12 (Showcase); 15 Total

KRU concert chronology
- ReKRUed Rap Tour (1993–1994); Awas! da' Concert (1995)

ReKRUed Rap Tour (also known as the Coca-Cola reKRUed Tour) was a concert tour by Malaysian boy band KRU, held in support of their second studio album, reKRUed. Sponsored by Coca-Cola Malaysia. The tour consisted of 3 concerts and 12 showcases held across Malaysia. It began with showcase performances on 18 December 1993 at Alpha Angle, Wangsa Maju and concluded with the final concert on 23 April 1994 at the Life Centre in Kuala Lumpur. It was the group's first concert tour since their debut in 1992.

== Background and development ==
Following the success of KRU's debut album Canggih (1992), Coca-Cola Malaysia collaborated with the group under its Coke is Music campaign to promote local talent through nationwide roadshows. This partnership led to the ReKRUed Rap Tour, comprising 3 concerts and 12 showcases held across Malaysia over five months.

The tour also promoted KRU's second album, reKRUed, which was released in October 1993. Tickets were available through Coca-Cola promotions, allowing fans to attend by redeeming product liners or multi-can packs.

Showcases took place at shopping centres and public venues, while the main concerts were staged in larger halls and stadiums featuring full performances, choreography, and stage effects. During the tour, KRU also participated in meet-and-greet sessions with fans and appeared on various live television and radio programmes nationwide.

== Concert synopsis ==
The concert opened with a stage stunt, as the KRU brothers Norman, Yusry, and Edry Abdul Halim descended from the upper level of the hall to the stage using ropes. The group began the show with "KRU is Wild", accompanied by five dancers and performing without additional musicians or backing vocalists. Norman primarily handled lead vocals, while Yusry and Edry played keyboards and provided vocal harmonies.

The setlist featured around fifteen songs from the albums Canggih and reKRUed including "Gadisku" performed by Yusry, as well as English-language cover versions of DJ Jazzy Jeff & The Fresh Prince's "Boom! Shake the Room" and House of Pain's "Jump Around". The concert concluded with "Janji Tinggal Janji", followed by an encore performance of "20/20". After the encore, KRU music videos were screened on the venue’s large display, marking the end of the concert.

== Critical reception ==
The concert received positive reviews from local media and fans, Berita Minggu praised KRU's performance as "energetic and engaging, proving their determination to rise as Malaysia's leading rap group". Meanwhile, the New Straits Times described the concert as "lively and entertaining, showing great promise for KRU as live performers".

== Commercial performance ==
The concert tour was a commercial success, with the final show at the Life Centre in Kuala Lumpur attracting an audience of approximately 3,000 people, including fans from Penang and Singapore.

== Tour dates ==
List of tours, showing date, city, venue, and attendance.
Date	City	Venue	Attendance	Ref.
Showcase (Note: The list is currently incomplete.)
18 December 1993	Kuala Lumpur	Alpha Angle, Wangsa Maju		
19 December 1993	Subang Jaya, Selangor	Subang Parade		
8 January 1994	Kuching, Sarawak	Wisma Pelita, Kuching		
22 January 1994	Malacca	Mahkota Parade, Malacca		
23 January 1994	Petaling Jaya, Selangor	The Atria, Damansara Jaya		
29 January 1994	Penang			
1 February 1994	Kuala Lumpur	Sungai Wang Plaza		
Concert
27 March 1994	Johor Bahru	Jubli Intan Hall	500	
9 April 1994	Alor Setar, Kedah	Tapak Pesta Alor Setar		
23 April 1994	Kuala Lumpur	Life Center	3,000	

== Personnel ==
- Norman – lead vocal
- Yusry – lead vocal, backing vocal, keyboard
- Edry – backing vocal, keyboard
- Coca-Cola Malaysia – Sponsor
