= Cinta Metropolitan =

1996 Malaysian film

- Theatrical release poster
- Directed by: Zulkefli M. Osman
- Written by: Zulkefli M. Osman
- Produced by: Julie Dahlan
- Starring: Norman Abdul Halim; Yusry Abdul Halim; Edry Abdul Halim; Vanida Imran; Emilia Rosnaida; Noreen Noor; Jalaluddin Hassan
- Music by: KRU
- Production companies: JD Productions; Grand Brilliance
- Distributed by: Grand Brilliance
- Release date: September 1996
- Country: Malaysia
- Language: Malay
- Budget: RM1.2 million
- Box office: RM1.1 million

Cinta Metropolitan (Metropolitan Love) is a 1996 Malaysian action-romantic film co-produced by JD Productions and Grand Brilliance Sdn. Bhd. and directed by Zulkefli M. Osman. The film stars Norman, Yusry, and Edry Abdul Halim of KRU, Vanida Imran, Emilia Rosnaida, Noreen Noor, and Jalaluddin Hassan.

== Synopsis ==
Haris, a photographer, meets his estranged brother Irwan at a dinner event. They become acquainted with Azlin after stopping a theft attempt. Irwan, who lives with his partner Monisa, develops interest in Azlin. Tension arises between the brothers when Irwan also approaches Haris’s girlfriend, Nurul. A thief named Rizal later reveals that Azlin’s brother, Farouk, is involved in a counterfeit money operation. The group becomes pursued by the syndicate and flees abroad.

== Cast ==
- Dato' Norman KRU as Haris – Irwan's older brother, a photographer who often rushes his work
- Datuk Yusry KRU as Irwan – a casanova, Haris's younger brother, educated abroad
- Edry KRU as Rizal – a thief and orphan
- Vanidah Imran as Nurul – Haris's close friend
- Emylia Rosnaida as Azlin – Farouk's younger sister, later falls in love with Irwan
- Dato' Jalaluddin Hassan as Farouk – leader of a counterfeit money syndicate
- Noreen Noor as Monisa – Irwan's sugar mummy
- Osman Kering as Cik Mat Tahir – Haris's boss
- Sheila Mambo as Sandra – Farouk's right-hand person
- Nana Nurgaya as Sara – Rizal's fellow thief

== Production ==
The film was produced by Julie Dahlan under JD Productions. The KRU brothers—Norman, Yusry, and Edry—were cast in October 1995, reportedly receiving RM120,000 for their participation. They also performed most of their own stunts in the film.

Principal photography began in October 1995. Filming also took place in Medan, Indonesia, over a ten-day period. The film’s production cost was estimated at RM1.2 million, making it the most expensive JD Productions' film to date.

== Release and reception ==
The film was released on September 1996. It was distributed by Grand Brilliance Sdn. Bhd.

=== Box office ===
The films had reached RM500,000 in the opening week. The film collected RM861,000 after 14 days in 13 cinemas. Total gross was RM1.1 million.

=== Marketing ===
A budget of RM100,000 was allocated for promotion across print, electronic media, and the film's original soundtrack.

The cast — KRU (Norman, Yusry, Edry), Vanida Imran, Emilia Rosnaida, Noreen Noor, and Jalaluddin Hassan — participated in meet-and-greet sessions at selected cinemas.

A contest linked to the film’s screenings offered prizes include free tickets to the movie, cassettes of the soundtrack, trips, hotel stays, dinner with the cast, T- shirt and merchandise.

The film targeted teen audiences, and KRU’s popularity was used to attract viewers.

=== Critical reception ===
Cinta Metropolitan received mixed reviews from critics. Haliza Ahmad of The Malay Mail described the film as “another version of KRU’s debut movie Awas!. Berita Harian reported that the movie’s box-office performance was below expectations despite wide publicity and extensive promotion.

== Soundtrack ==
The original soundtrack was released by EMI Music Malaysia. It contained 21 tracks performed by KRU.

== Publication ==
A novel adaptation of the film was published in August 1996 to promote the film. It was the first novel published by KRU Publishing Sdn. Bhd.

== Legacy ==
Julie Dahlan planned a sequel titled Cinta Metropolitan 2. Disappointed with the reception of their first film, the KRU brothers were not interested in taking on acting roles despite lucrative offers. Following the film, the KRU brothers shifted their focus to music and television production.
