= Jammin' the Nation =

1999–2000 concert tour by KRU

- Tour by KRU
- Associated album: The Way We Jam
- Start date: 20 March 1999
- End date: 22 January 2000
- Legs: 3
- No. of shows: 5 (Malaysia); 1 (Singapore); 1 (Jakarta); 1 (Manila); 1 (Bangkok); 1 (Brunei); 10 Total
- Guests: Juliana Banos

KRU concert chronology
- KRU Mega Tour '97 (1997); Jammin' the Nation (1999–2000); Konsert Empayar KRUjaan (2002)

Jammin' the Nation (also known as Jamming The Nation 1999 – Interstate and Regional Tour) was the fourth concert tour by Malaysian boy band KRU, held in support of their sixth studio album and first English-language release, The Way We Jam. The tour consisted of three legs: the Interstate Tour, the Regional Tour, and the Asia Tour. It began on 20 March 1999 at MBJB Indoor Stadium, Johor Bahru, and concluded on 22 January 2000 in Brunei Darussalam. Sponsored by Pepsi, the concerts featured songs primarily from The Way We Jam.

== Background and development ==
In August 1998, KRU signed a multi-million-ringgit endorsement deal with Pepsi, becoming the brand's official ambassadors in Malaysia. The group was featured under the Pepsi Music platform alongside international artists such as Janet Jackson, Ricky Martin, The Corrs, and Five.

As part of the collaboration, KRU announced a concert tour titled Jammin' the Nation, organised by KRU Berhad and sponsored by Pepsi. The tour included five concerts across Malaysia, as well as concert in Singapore and Brunei, along with a series of showcases and roadshows in Jakarta (Indonesia), Bangkok (Thailand), and Manila (Philippines). The group's English-language album The Way We Jam was released on 26 November 1998 to coincide with the tour, marking their first major step into the international market.

Tickets were sold at 7-Eleven outlets nationwide, and Era FM served as the official radio partner. The tour also marked KRU's first time performing with a live band, accompanied by professional musicians.The concert tour incorporated innovative choreography, pyrotechnics, and lighting effects.

== Concert synopsis ==
The concert opened with a performance by Juliana Banos, a newly signed artist under KRU Music, who performed the songs "Mana Satu" and "Tiap Detik". The KRU brothers then took the stage, supported by a five-member live band and nine dancers, delivering a 90-minute set featuring around 20 songs, most of which were in English.

The set began with "Tribe", followed by "Why Must I Feel Like That", "Fobia", "For You", "Do My Thang (Upside Down)", and "More Than Forever". Midway through the concert, KRU performed a medley of songs they had written for other Malaysian artists such as Ning Baizura, Zainal Abidin, and Indigo. They also performed their Malay hits such as "Fanatik" from KRUmania. The show concluded with "The Way We Jam".

== Critical reception ==
The concert received mixed reviews from critics. Hasleen Bachik from Singapore's Berita Harian described the show as "energetic but overly Westernised", noting the limited number of Malay songs performed. Conversely, The Straits Times praised KRU as "unstoppable", commending their "rip-roaring ensemble" and inventive choreography. Harian Metro reported that KRU’s performance in Melaka and Johor Bahru drew thousands of fans, proving the trio's popularity remained strong.

== Commercial performance ==
The concerts were well received by audiences across all tour locations. The Singapore show at Harbour Pavilion drew approximately 2,000 fans, while showcases in Jakarta, Manila, and Bangkok saw enthusiastic participation from audiences, many of whom sang along to "More Than Forever" and "The Way We Jam". The tour's success helped the group achieve chart-topping recognition in those countries.

== Set list ==
The following set list is representative of the concert held at Harbour Pavilion, World Trade Centre, Singapore.

Juliana Banos segment

1. "Tiap Detik"
2. "Mana Satu"

KRU segment

1. "Tribe"
2. "Why Must I Feel Like That"
3. "For You"
4. "Do My Thang"
5. "More Than Forever"
6. "The D"
7. "Out of My Mind"
8. "Never Let the Spirit Die"
9. "The Way We Jam"
10. "Fobia"
11. "Fanatik"
12. Medley: "Ceritera" / "Bawa Daku Pergi"

== Tour dates ==
List of concerts, showing date, city, venue, and attendance
Date	City	Venue	Attendance	Notes	Ref.
Interstate Tour
20 March 1999	Johor Bahru, Johor	MBJB Indoor Stadium		Concert tour	
3 April 1999	Malacca	Pay Fong High School Hall		Concert tour	
24 April 1999	Penang	Tapak Pesta Sungai Nibong		Concert tour	
1 May 1999	Kuantan, Pahang	Indera Mahkota Indoor Stadium		Concert tour	
8 May 1999	Kuala Lumpur	Merdeka Hall, Putra World Trade Centre		Concert tour	
28 May 1999	Singapore	Harbour Pavilion, World Trade Centre	2,000	Concert tour	
Regional Tour
April 1999	Jakarta, Indonesia			Showcase performance	
April 1999	Manila, Philippines			Showcase performance	
April 1999	Bangkok, Thailand			Showcase performance	
Asia Tour
22 January 2000	Bandar Seri Begawan, Brunei			Asia Tour concert	

== Personnel ==
- KRU – performers
- Juliana Banos – guest performer
- Era FM – official radio partner
- Pepsi – sponsor
- KRU Berhad – organiser
