= KRU =

Malaysian boy band

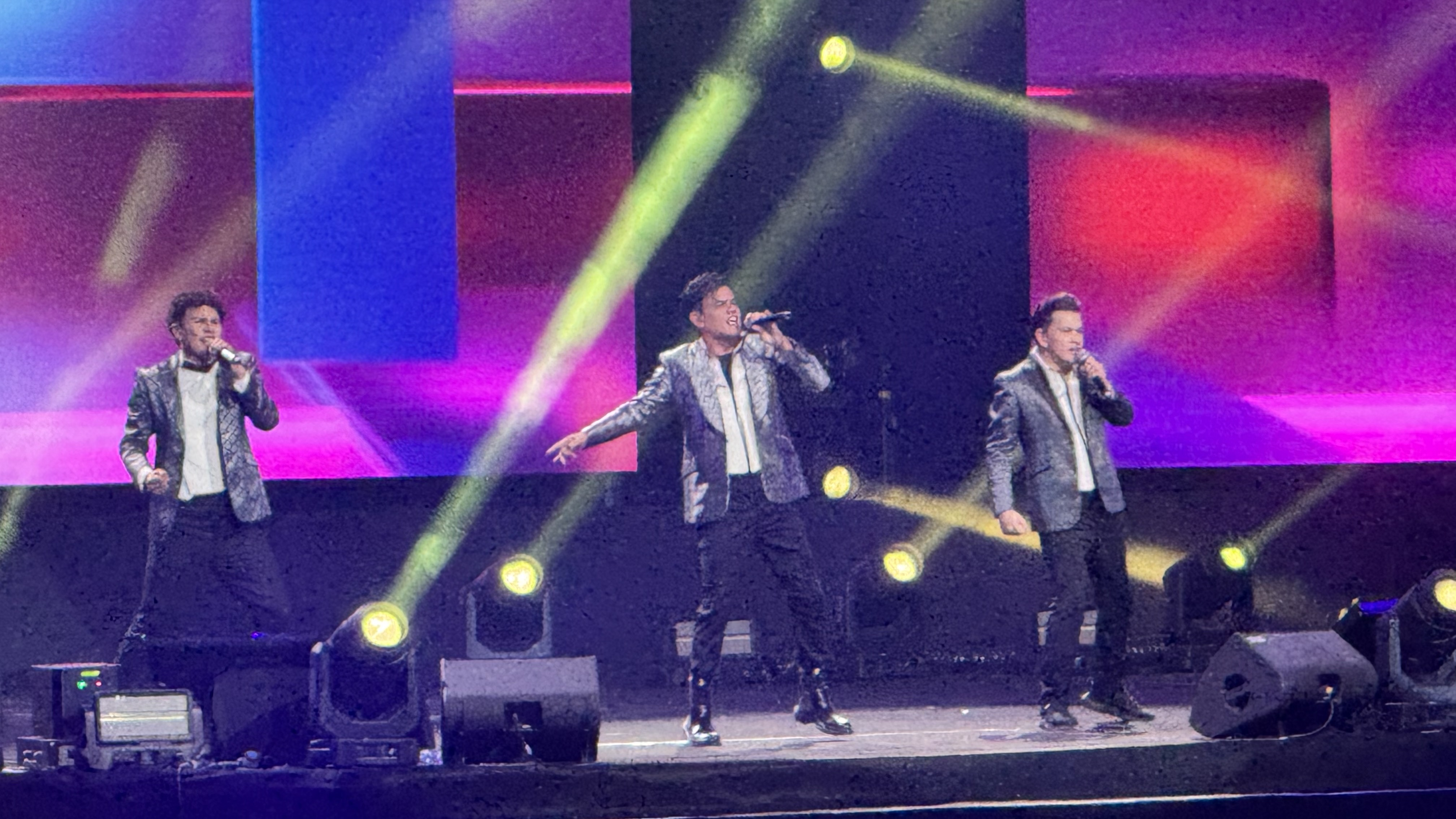
- KRU performing at the GenKRU concert in May 2025. From left: Edry, Yusry, and Norman

Background information
- Also known as: Selangor Rappers Unit (1992); Tyco (2000–2001)
- Origin: Kuala Lumpur, Malaysia
- Genres: Pop; R&B; hip hop
- Works: Discography; songs
- Years active: 1992–present (Note: Hiatus from 2018 to 2024.)
- Labels: KRU Music; EMI Music Malaysia
- Members: Norman Abdul Halim; Yusry Abdul Halim; Edry Abdul Halim
- Website: www.kru-group.com

KRU are a Malaysian boy band from Kuala Lumpur. They were formed in 1992 by brothers Norman, Yusry and Edry Abdul Halim. KRU performs songs in both Malay and English and released several hit singles around the rise of Malaysian pop music, collectively known as M-Pop and towards of the 21st century. The band's musical style, which has garnered praise for its anthemic quality and emotional engagement that appeals to a broad audience, spans with their blend of pop, R&B and hip hop, while their lyrics focus on subjects including loss, heartbreak and relationship, and personal struggles. KRU also established themselves as a renowned composer, lyricist and record producer and has contributed to material for prominent Malaysian music industry artists in various genres since then.

Their debut album, Canggih, was released in 1992 under EMI Music Malaysia, with songs like "Cherrina", "Hanya Kau" and "20/20" were released as singles and help raised KRU to prominence. KRU released their first and only English-language album, The Way We Jam (1998), which saws them collaborated with well-known international composers, lyricists, and producers. The album was a critical and commercial success, with the lead single of the same name won the 1999 Anugerah Industri Muzik for the Best Music Video while the album won the Best Engineered Album. In 2000, the brothers formed a virtual band named Tyco, which was touted as the Malaysia's first virtual musical group, with members consisted of 3D animated versions of themselves. The trio disbanded in 2018 after their last concert, Konsert Gergasi KRU25 in Istana Budaya and went hiatus to focus on their careers and personal lives individually, but reunited in 2024 to release their new album, Kaset and embarked on their GenKRU concert.

Apart from their music career, the KRU brothers made their acting debut in feature films Awas! (1995) and Cinta Metropolitan (1996), where they contributed soundtracks for both films. They also ventured into business with the establishment of KRU Group of Companies, which have subsidiaries operated in various business segments, including KRU Studios and KRU Music. KRU is the most successful male Malaysian music group of the 1990s and 2000s. They have received numerous accolades, including Anugerah Bintang Popular Berita Harian, Anugerah Planet Muzik and Anugerah Juara Lagu as well as recognition from The Malaysia Book of Records. Their success inspired numerous other groups of their generation to follow in their tracks.

== History ==
=== 1992–1999: Formation, Canggih and early years ===
The three KRU brothers – Norman, Yusry and Edry – who were born to Abdul Halim Kamal and Zarina Abdul Wahab Fenner, showed their interest in music in their childhood when one of their aunts bought Norman a keyboard which also attracted his other brothers. They spent their teenage years in London, England for two years and obtained musical and academic education as their father worked there. The brothers did various jobs to make ends meet: Norman worked at a petrol station, Yusry worked at a Tandoori restaurant and Edry delivered newspapers to houses. While in London, they were exposed to various genres of music, in contrast to the Malay music scene at that time which was dominated by classic rock and ballads.

The first song composed by the brothers themselves was "Untukmu", which Norman wrote at the age of 16. He said that the song is about his feeling towards someone else. Starting from scratch, they began to learn how to compose songs and focused on production after buying a music CD. They continued to write original songs since then and were unaware that one of Norman's college friends sent a demo to EMI. Calvin Wong, the then-International Label Manager of EMI and now a vice-president at Warner Music Asia Pacific, was impressed by the song and called the brothers to audition. During their formation on 19 May 1992, the group initially settled for the name Selangor Rappers Unit (SRU) with only Norman and Edry as members; after Yusry joined them, the group immediately changed its name to KRU. The group's name (Note: Addressed by the initials "K.R.U." and not the pronunciation "kroo".) stands for Kumpulan Rap Utama or "Major Rap Group", but it is also the Malay word for "crew", borrowed from English.

After signing with EMI, KRU released their debut album, Canggih, on 5 October 1992. The album contains 12 songs all composed and written by the brothers themselves. Two songs from the album, "Cherrina" and "Hanya Kau" was released as singles and became hits. The album also contains "20/20", which was specially dedicated to the then-fourth Prime Minister, Mahathir Mohamad and is inspired by Wawasan 2020, which was introduced by Mahathir. The album was well-received by the market and sold over 20,000 copies, earning KRU a platinum certification and propelling the brothers to fame. But, the Malaysian public broadcaster Radio Televisyen Malaysia (RTM) complained about the album's content, which was deemed to promote yellow culture, and banned 9 out of the 12 songs in the album from radio airplay. The broadcaster also demanded the brothers to change the lyrics of "2020" due to language concerns.

Their second album, reKRUed, was released in October 1993, containing two lead singles "Mengerti" and "Janji Tinggal Janji". The album was well-received, sold over 60,000 copies, and received considerable attention from music critics for its rap and acappella influences. To promote the album's release, KRU held an interview session with fans via a telephone on 4 December, as well as embarking their ReKRUed Rap Tour with three concerts and 12 showcases was held nationwide from 18 December 1993 to 23 April 1994. In the concert, KRU performs songs from their first two albums.

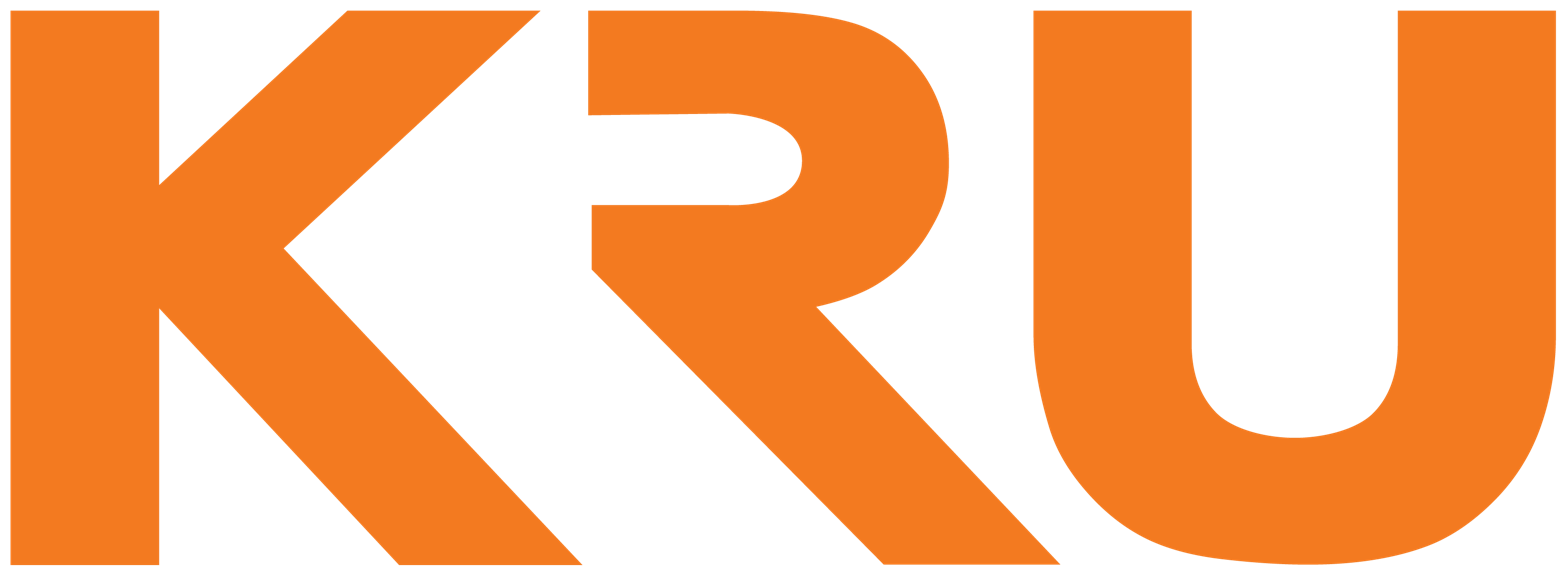
The wordmark logo of KRU.

The following year, KRU released their third album, Awas! in an extended play (EP) format in September 1994 with an accompanying biographical scrap book published by Kharisma Publications. The album contains 6 songs including a new version of "Janji Tinggal Janji" and "Untukmu", which was made famous by Feminin. For the latter, KRU perform in a cappella. The album sold more than 60,000 copies and was certified double platinum. Later, the brothers made their acting debut in 1995 film, Awas!, which features the group portraying themselves. Principal photography began in November 1994 in Penang, the film was released on 7 September 1995 and became commercial success. They also released their fourth album, Awas! da' Soundtrack, which served as a soundtrack album for the film, containing 13 songs, composed and written by themselves. To promote both the album and the film of the same name, KRU embarked on their Awas! da' Concert tour. The first leg began in Datuk Sheikh Ahmad Stadium in Kangar, Perlis on 14 July and ended in Stadium Negara on 25 August.

On 19 March 1996, KRU released their fifth album, Ooh! La! La!. Like their previous albums, all tracks composed and written by the brothers themselves. Three singles from the album, the title track, "Apa Saja" and "Diari Metropolitan" were hits, as was the album; it sold 150,000 copies in seven months upon its release, and being certified multi-platinum. Later, KRU was among of 10 Malaysian artistes including Ziana Zain, Man Bai, Feminin and Ning Baizura who performed at the Konsert Kemuncak Dunia at Stadium Negara on 19 July 1996. The concert, which was held in support for the 1997 expedition to the Mount Everest, was attended by 3,000 audiences. They also performed an anthem for the expedition, entitled "Everest". The KRU brothers then become a main cast alongside Vanidah Imran in a romantic drama film Cinta Metropolitan, directed by the late Julie Dahlan. Unlike Awas! where KRU portrays as themselves, Cinta Metropolitan saws the brothers portrays different characters, with Norman took his role as Haris, Yusry as Irwan and Edry as Rizal. They also contributed the film's soundtrack album, which mostly consists of their songs from Ooh! La! La!, which was released six months earlier. Released in September, the film was a commercial failure.

On 3 March 1997, KRU released a compilation album entitled KRUmania which included three new songs, "Fanatik", "Di Pintu Syurga" featuring a duet with their protege, Elite and a cover version of P. Ramlee's "Getaran Jiwa". The song, which is a theme tune of Ramlee's 1960 drama film Antara Dua Darjat, saws the KRU brothers sang along with archived Ramlee's recorded vocals. KRU's rendition of "Getaran Jiwa" have earned them a recognition from The Malaysia Book of Records as the first Malaysian artist to have a digital duet with a deceased musician. The album was well received by the market and sold over 80,000 copies in 5 days upon its release. To promote KRUmania, the group embarked a three-month concert tour on 15 locations throughout Malaysia; the KRUmania Mega Tour '97 tour began with a concert in Johor Bahru, Johor on 17 May and ended in Stadium Negara, Kuala Lumpur on 4 October. Due to demand, an additional concert tour was held in December. Later, KRU was commissioned by the Government of Selangor to produce a tribute album for Selangor national football team titled Viva Selangor. The album contains 8 songs that performed by the team players themselves. They also won six awards including Best Music Video for their single, "Fanatik" at the second Music Video Awards held at the Auditorium Besar in Angkasapuri, Kuala Lumpur.

In August 1998, KRU was chosen by Pepsi to perform "Never Let the Spirit Die", one of the songs chosen as the theme song for the 16th Commonwealth Games in Kuala Lumpur; To promote the single, its interactive CD-ROM was released in September in conjunction with the KRU-Pepsi promotion. They among a few artistes including Sharifah Aini, Zainal Abidin, Amy Search, Ning Baizura, Ella and Sheila Majid to recorded the soundtrack for Malaysia's first animated feature film, Silat Legenda. KRU composed and perform three songs for the film's soundtrack, "Silat Legenda", "Fobia" and a duet with Sheila, "Setia Bersama". KRU's sixth studio album and their first English-language album, The Way We Jam, was released on 26 November 1998. The album includes songs written by other international composers like Diane Warren, David Foster and Babyface as well as some written by themselves. They also recorded a cover version of "Never Ask Too Much (of Love)" by American gospel music group, Take 6. Spawned three singles, the album is a critical and commercial success. The music video for the titular song, won the 6th Anugerah Industri Muzik for the Best Music Video while the album itself won the Best Engineered Album on 10 April 1999.

In January 1999, KRU composed and performed the official theme tune for the 1999 edition of Le Tour de Langkawi, titled "Fiesta". An official music video for the song was produced, with utilised 3D graphical and animation techniques. Produced by their own company KRU Motion Pictures, the music video for "Fiesta" costed RM40,000. The group embarked on their Jammin' the Nation tour. It began in Kuala Lumpur on from March 20, continued in Singapore, Indonesia, Thailand and the Philippines and ended in Brunei on 22 January 2000. Later, KRU received sponsorship from Proton and embarked on their tour in Australia for the Proton World Tour. They headlining mini-concerts and make a public appearances at 15 different locations in Australia, including Sydney, Melbourne and Brisbane with the tour lasted for a month, from September 28 to October 17. KRU's seventh studio album, Formula Luarbiasa was released on 16 December 1999. It was supported by three lead singles, "Luar Biasa", "Formula" and "Jangan Lafazkan". The album's first single, "Luar Biasa" was launched four months earlier with the limited copies of its CD single, contains four versions of the song, have been sold out and it was chosen as the theme song for Perodua. To promote the album, KRU utilised an airplane to carry the album's banner. The album was well-received by the market and as of March 2000, it has sold more than 30,000 copies.

=== 2000–2002: Tyco and KRUjaan ===
On 13 March 2000, KRU produced and released Ideologi, a compilation album consists of songs composed by the brothers and performed by renowned Malaysian artistes, including Indigo, Elite and Juliana Banos. KRU was among seven artistes including Sheila Majid, Siti Nurhaliza and Raihan who performed at the Paralympic Charity Concert in Stadium Merdeka on 12 October 2000. The fundraising concert, which was organised by the Malaysian Paralympic Council (MPC), was a commercial success although the number of attendees are not many.

Looking for a new direction in their music career and the music industry, in December the same year, KRU formed a virtual band named Tyco, (Note: Tyco is a Cantonese term which means "big brother".) whose members consisted of computer-generated alternate versions of themselves, with Norman, Yusry, and Edry as avatars Tylo, Yiko, and Psylo respectively. According to KRU, the concept and idea of Tyco was based on that of British virtual band, Gorillaz. To distinguished themselves from Tyco, KRU had pointed out that Tyco are "a separate entity with its own identity". The animation process for the group was done by the Malaysian animation studio, Flare Studios. Their eponymous studio album, KRU's eighth studio album overall, was released on 14 December 2000, containing 14 songs in both Malay and English. Although the project was lauded as groundbreaking with its CGI music video "Bidadari" and "With U" and was awarded "Malaysia's First Virtual Artiste" by the Malaysia Book of Records, Tyco failed to achieve mainstream success and the project was quietly dissolved. Later, KRU produced and released the second Ideologi compilation album on 5 February 2001, also contains songs performed by artists under KRU Music Group.

KRU's ninth studio album, KRUjaan was released on 16 May 2002 as part of their 10th anniversary celebration. The album's musical style was hiptronic, a portmanteau of hip-hop and electronic music. It was supported by six lead singles, including "Impak Maksima", "Mahaguru" and "Aku Benci". To promote the album, the brothers headlining a two-hour mobile concert, which was held on 18 May. Later, they were invited by Malaysian low-cost airline AirAsia to perform at one of its airplanes in conjunction with the official opening of the AirAsia's booking office in Prangin Mall, Penang on 29 June and become the first Malaysian artist to have performing live on the airplane.

On 26 October 2002, KRU released a reissue edition of KRUjaan, titled Empayar KRUjaan V2.0, which contains four new songs, including "U Got Style" and a cover version of Revolver's "Perpisahan" and Sudirman Arshad's "Terasing", which they combined both songs and re-recorded them as "Perpisahan Terasing". At the same time, they kicked off their fifth major tour, Konsert Empayar KRUjaan at Dataran Merdeka in Kuala Lumpur. Their performance at the concert was well received, and attended by 50,000 audiences.

=== 2003–2012: Continued success ===
In June 2003, Yusry, one of the KRU brothers, released his first and only self-titled solo album and became the only KRU member to release a solo album. The album yielded three lead singles, "Dekat Padamu", "Warna Kehidupanku" and a duet with his then-wife, Erra Fazira, "Jika Kau Tiada". His debut solo effort was well-received, with many music critics compared his with to that of KRU. KRU released another compilation album, Relax in April 2004. The album includes several of their popular songs from their previous albums, as well as two new songs, "Babe" and "Di Hatimu". The compilation, according to KRU, was described as a "transition or change" in their music career. In October, KRU announced that they will release their new album in 2005. Their eleventh studio album, KRUnisme, was released on the New Year's Day 2005. The album is preceded by its lead single, "Terhangat di Pasaran", featuring a Sabahan singer and former Akademi Fantasia season 2 contestant, Adam Mat Saman. Both the album and the single was well received by music critics.

KRU is one of few Malaysian artists, collectively known as Artis Bersatu, who contributed a special song titled "Suluhkan Sinar". Released in January 2005, the song, which was produced by the brothers, was specially dedicated to the victims of the 2004 Indian Ocean earthquake and tsunami and it is officiated by the then-Deputy Prime Minister, Najib Razak. Other artists involved in the project were Akademi Fantasia contestants, Erra Fazira, Dayang Nurfaizah, Alleycats, Jaclyn Victor and Anita Sarawak.

10 di Skala Richter, KRU's twelfth studio album, was released in July 2006. It was supported by its lead singles "Gerenti Beres", "Buat Hal Lagi" and "C'mon Lah". It became their last studio album with EMI as their 15-year contract with the label ended soon after. KRU was among seven Malaysian R&B and hip-hop artists, including Too Phat and Ruffedge, who were involved in a tribute album for Malaysian female rock singer Ella called Urban Strike ...with Ella, which was released on 11 July. KRU re-recorded and performed "Kitalah Bintang" in the album. Two years later, Edry released his debut solo single, "Sumpah Takkan Cari Yang Lain", which was composed and written by himself. The single was later included as one of the soundtracks of Cicakman 2: Planet Hitam. The film's soundtrack album also included "Di Bius Cinta", which performed by Yusry and Indonesian singer-songwriter, Melly Goeslaw, and "Planet Hitam" by Tyco, which features lead vocals solely from Norman.

In January 2011, KRU released Hitman, a compilation album comprising 18 songs composed by Edry and performed by various artists. An MTV karaoke of the album was released in May. The compilation also included KRU new single, "Ganas". Later, in November, KRU along with other artists including Ramli Sarip, Hannah Tan and Suki Low performed an anthem for the Malaysian contingent participating in the 26th Southeast Asian Games, titled "Gemuruh Suara", with the lyrics is in both Malay and English. In 2012, KRU celebrated the 20th anniversary of their music career, and at the same time, performed at an exclusive concert with artists under KRU Music on 10 June at the Neverland@Orange, Kuala Lumpur. In September 2012, KRU released the first single from their upcoming album, "Wanita", which was specially dedicated to their mother, Zarina Abdul Wahab Fenner.

=== 2013–2018: KRUnomena and breakup ===
KRU released their thirteenth studio album and their first album in seven years, KRUnomena on 31 January 2013. Edry become the album's producer and composed all 10 songs. The album spawned four singles, including its first single, "Wanita" and a duet with Stacy Anam titled "Semalam Tanpamu". The album, which took 2 years to completed, is their first studio album with their own record label, KRU Music after having signed with EMI. Later, KRU released their first Hari Raya Aidilfitri single, "Erti Aidilfitri" in July, followed by a compilation album, 1, containing 30 songs from their previous studio albums in September.

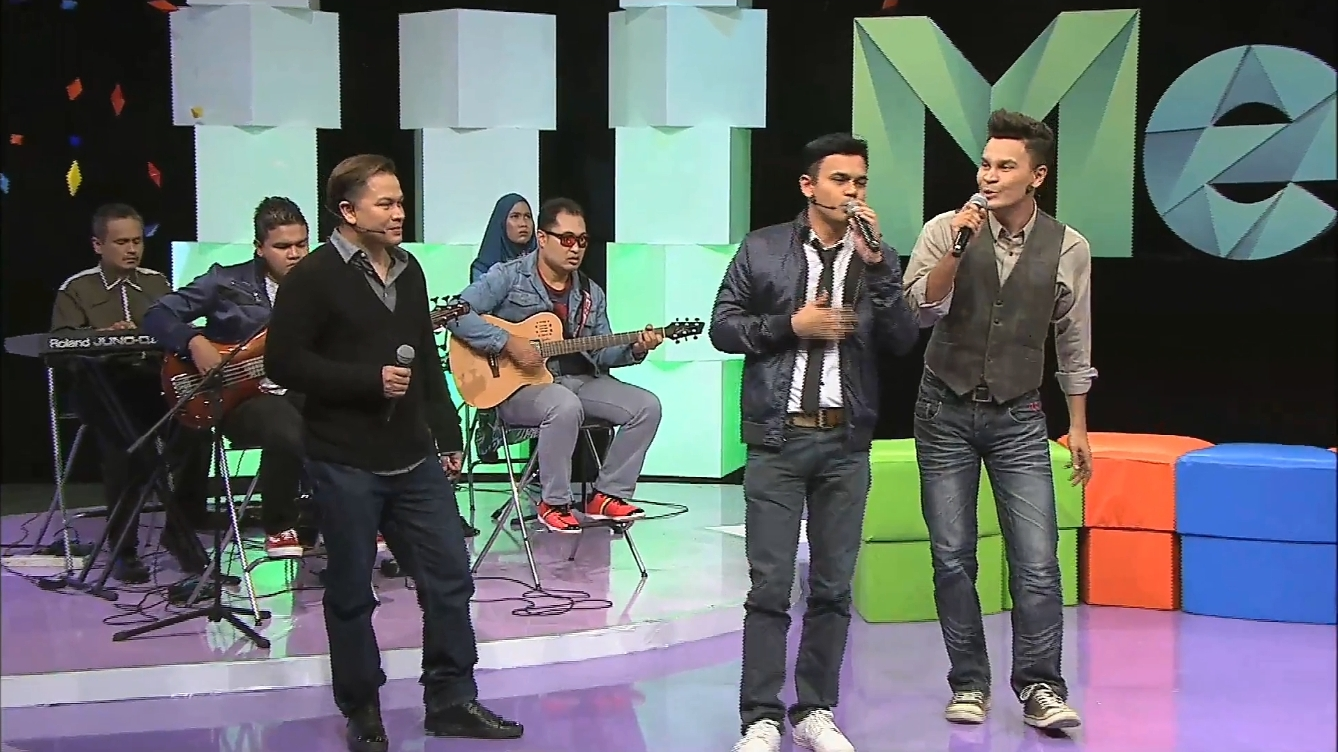
KRU performs on MeleTOP on 15 March 2016.

KRU was chosen to perform an official song for the 2015 SEA Games, which they entitled "Kuasa Juara". Released on 3 June 2015, the song, which was composed by Norman and Archie Nasution with lyrics by Norman, took a week to complete. According to Norman, the song was "blended with aggressive beats along with rap elements". The song earned the group a Sports and Innovation category at the 2015 IOC Trophy Awards organised by the International Olympic Committee (IOC). On 11 January 2016, KRU released their new single, "Hingga Ke Jannah", which was written and composed by Edry. The single was heralded by a music critic from Galaksi Media as "far more mature", highlighting its "deep spiritual elements" while "retaining pop as a main genre". On 6 February, one of the KRU brothers, Norman was among the 85 recipients of the Darjah Indera Mahkota Pahang (DIMP) which carries the title of Datuk in conjunction with Sultan of Pahang, Sultan Ahmad Shah's birthday.

On 18 April 2018, KRU announced that they would disband after their last concert, the Konsert Gergasi KRU25 which took place at Istana Budaya for three days from 4 to 6 May 2018, with 80 percent of tickets being sold out. At the concert's second and third day, at least a dozen of fans throughout the country congregated to see KRU for the last time. Norman said he and two younger brothers Yusry and Edry have reached the decision and agreed to disband KRU after exactly 25 years of being active in music industry. There were also no plans for KRU to reunite in the future as the brothers concentrated on their own careers and personal lives respectively. Norman also informed that all KRU's business entities will still in operation as usual. To coincide with their disbandment, KRU released their last single before their breakup, entitled "Tahan Lama", featuring a duet with Joe Flizzow, followed by their greatest hits album, Gergasi, which contains the group's 30 popular tracks. A special rockumentary about KRU's career was announced by Norman and released in July 2018.

=== 2019–2024: Hiatus and post-KRU activities ===
After KRU's dissolution, the three brothers entered hiatus and went on to focus on their respective careers and personal lives. Norman focused on expanding their company's business, including KRU Studios, KRU Music and other subsidiaries operating under KRU Group of Companies. In 2020, Tyco with Norman as sole member under his moniker, Tylo returns through the collaboration with Kazim Elias and Tuju from K-Clique for a song entitled "Salawat 1442" released by Imaan Music. Edry moved to Manchester, United Kingdom to focus on his children's education, especially his son, Emery, who was born with autism, while concurrently focused on composing and produced music for other artistes.

Yusry focused on filmmaking, and directed several TV dramas including Ganjil and Nenek Bongkok Tiga, and films including 2022 film, Juang where he becomes one of the 5 directors. He also became one of the two judges of One in a Million season 4 on TV3. Yusry was among the 335 recipients of the Orders, Medals and Stars of the Federal Territory and conferred the Panglima Mahkota Wilayah (PMW) which carries the title of Datuk by the then-Yang di-Pertuan Agong, Al-Sultan Abdullah Ri'ayatuddin Al-Mustafa Billah Shah in conjunction with the Federal Territories' Day on 1 February 2021.

=== 2024–present: Reunion, Kaset and GenKRU concert ===
On 10 October 2024, KRU announced that they reunited after 6 years of hiatus and signed with Sony Music Malaysia on the same day. The group released their fourteenth studio album, Kaset on 25 April 2025. It is their first studio album in 12 years since KRUnomena (2013) and the album's title was chosen as a tribute to cassette era. Yusry said about the album's title: "We were born in the cassette era, and Kaset represents not just our journey, but also a tribute to the medium that first carried our music to the fans". The album is preceded by the release of its first single composed by themselves, "Voodoo" on 22 November 2024. A music video was produced to promote the single, in which KRU become the first artist in Malaysia and also in Asia to utilized artificial intelligence (AI) technology to create their digital twin in a music video. The music video of "Voodoo" has garnered 1.2 million views in YouTube since its released. The album's second single, "One More Time", was released on 17 January 2025. Like the first single, "Voodoo"'s music video, the KRU brothers also utilized AI technology for "One More Time"'s music video.

KRU embarked on their GenKRU concert, which held for four nights from 3 to 11 May 2025 in Axiata Arena, Bukit Jalil. The concert is a commercial success where 8,000 tickets were successfully sold out within an hour. GenKRU earned KRU two recognitions from the Malaysia Book of Records (MBOR), namely the "Fastest Concert Ticket Sales in One Hour" and "Most Numbered Performances in a Concert Series". The group concluded their GenKRU concert series with the last leg on 28 June 2025 in The Star Theatre, Singapore, where it received overwhelming response from KRU fans in Singapore. It is their first live performance in Singapore since 2016. KRU also planned to hold the GenKRU concert series in Penang by the end of August although they never announced it publicly. Norman has since ruled this out, citing to "maintain performance quality, cost factor, production and technical aspects".

On 29 September 2025, KRU announced in a press conference that they would headlined a GenKRU finale concert, entitled GenKRU the Finale: One More Time, with its ticket sales were opened on 3 October and sold out. Norman revealed that the concert come up with a different scale as it would be held in an open venue, the first time they headlined a concert from indoor to outdoor venue. The concert was held on 22 November at the Bukit Jalil National Hockey Stadium and become a commercial success when the concert was attended by 10,000 audiences. They also embarked on their first cruise show, Dream KRUise, which was initially to be held for 4 days and 3 nights, from 27 to 30 January 2026 in Singapore and Thailand. However, the anticipated show did not materialized.

Group member, Yusry released his new single, "Jiwa & Raga" in June 2026. It is his first official recording release in 22 years since his eponymous solo album. The new single will preceded the release of his upcoming debut EP.

== Artistry ==
=== Image ===
KRU have declared themselves as a rap group instead of being just a boy band. In an interview with Singapore's Berita Harian, Norman acknowledge there are similarities and differences between KRU and other boy bands: "What makes us not a boy band is, we are not manufactured and not packaged in a seamless shapes like other boy bands. It's true [that] our group is made up of a men and we are also dancing while on stage. But, boy bands usually won't last long. They're just released one or two albums, and then, disappeared". They later pointed out that the term 'boy band' is "just a public perception".

Earlier in their career, KRU is known to have incorporated their cleaner image. In order to be the role model to their fans, the trio monitor their moves. Norman said: "We don't smoke, drinking alcohols and we are always well-dressed" [...] For the sake of [our] fans, we'd tried to avoid these. Moreover, it is not good for health". The brothers also take careful in social interactions. While maintaining their clean and tidy images, KRU acknowledged that their appearances is always neat and edge and in line with the tastes of current teenager's trends. KRU's personal image was later highlighted and praised by Roslen Fadzil of Harian Metro who commended the brothers for not bringing bad images on any occasions, even in their concerts, much like some of their contemporaries but still being able to have an illustrious career.

=== Musical styles and themes ===
"Awas!" (1994)
"Awas!" was one of KRU's most successful single, with lyrics inspired by signboards and related to homewreckers.

Throughout their career, KRU have explored many musical genres, which spans pop, R&B, dance and hip hop, with a focus on catchy melodies and energetic rhythms. The brothers also included genres like a cappella, ballad, new jack swing and funk. Most of their songs were performed by Yusry and Edry as the lead singers, while Norman contributed rap in some of their songs. Their first studio album, Canggih, features distinct musical concepts with the blend of rap, pop, rock, techno and reggae, while their third album, Awas! incorporates genres such as soul and dance. With The Way We Jam, the brothers incorporate a more "stronger scent of the R&B" while maintaining their hip hop sound; the album features a unique identity which has been described as a "familiar rhythm and blues-soul grooves combined with some very mushy love ballads". "Formula", from Formula Luarbiasa, on the other hand, was considered to be inspired by funky groove sounds. Later in their career, KRU transitioned to spiritual and other music genres, exploring a combination of "modern music and electronic sounds".

Their lyrics are often centred around various subjects including loss, heartbreak and relationship, and personal struggles. Some of their lyrics also highlights themes such as hopes, reflections, and even social commentaries. Norman said that most of KRU's songs were based on their own experience or past history of any persons. In a separate interview with Utusan Malaysia and Harian Metro, Norman revealed that "Awas!", their single which was released in 1994, was inspired by signboards and related to homewreckers: "[It's] about a female artist we were once admire due to her beauty. But what was disappointed us was when the female artist chose an older man as her boyfriend. We made that story into a song". Most of their songs also carries positive messages, for instance, "Fanatik", as stated by Norman, is to remind teenages and youths "not to be hypocrites, but to be more open-minded". Meanwhile, "Fobia", a soundtrack of 1998 animated film, Silat Lagenda, was considered as KRU's reflections of their outburst of anxiety. "Cherrina" is said to be inspired by Norman's reflections of the death of his college friend due to road accident. Saniboey Mohd Ismail, writing for Harian Metro, examined that messages in KRU's songs "never directly leads to negative values as expressed by most Western rappers who are based on the rhythm of gangsta rap".

While they almost exclusively release Malaysian Malay songs, KRU has also released Malaysian English songs. They are also known to have at least three or more English tracks on each of their album, and released a full English album, The Way We Jam in 1998. "Wanita Jelita", one of the songs from the album, carries English lyrics despite its title being Malay.

=== Songwriting ===
Over the course of their music career, KRU is also well-known for their songwriting and production works. Edry, the youngest of the KRU brothers, is a primary songwriter and producer for most of their songs. Regarding their songwriting process, Norman explained that they "took seriously" when it comes to music: "We produced our own albums, composed our own songs and managed our own careers. The most appropriate title for us not just as a singer, but a singer-songwriter and [record] producer". Aside their own music, KRU has also written and produced songs for other artists. Their compositions have been performed by a number of artists, including Jaclyn Victor, Anita Sarawak, Erra Fazira, Ella, Tiara Jacquelina, Anuar Zain, Amy Mastura, Ning Baizura, Rabbani, Elite and Feminin.

== Impact and legacy ==
"In their three decades in music, the trio have churned many hits that are still fresh in the mind of many local music lovers [...] The music of the brothers left a lasting mark on the local music scene, with their rise to stardom symbolising a modern shift in Malaysian pop culture".

— The Star's S. Navalan on KRU's impact in Malaysia's music industry

KRU has been described as "legendary" by several media publications. According to Alfian Sa'at from Singapore's The Straits Times, "In a music market saturated by rock bands manufacturing one tortured rock ballad after another, KRU has managed to fill in a gaping vacum for boy bands". New Straits Times' Gerald Chuah wrote that the brothers are seem to "growing restless about the progress of their music career, which has seemingly reached the plateau". Riadz Radzi of Harian Metro hailed KRU as "an icon among teenagers who were crazy about rap music" during their early days in the 1990s. Likewise, Zul Husni Abdul Hamid of Berita Harian praised KRU for championing the Malaysian music industry, commented that the brothers' brand "in the Malay music industry is still standing strong and has even developed into an increasingly respected brand at the international level". He also wrote that KRU's presence has "leave a significant impact on the local music industry".

Malaysian lifestyle portal, Hype, described KRU as "the forefront of the Malaysian music scene". Akmar Annuar of The Malaysian Reserve praised the brothers for bolstering the Malaysia's music revolution and also praise their music has "continued to echo through the decades". In her review of their GenKRU concert, she wrote, "Despite being in their late 40s and early 50s, Norman, Edry and Yusry perform with stamina and showmanship that rival their early days" and opined that the GenKRU "was never just a concert – it was a cultural reckoning, a generational checkpoint and for many Malaysians, a deeply personal rewind into adolescence". Writing for Utusan Malaysia, Roshihan Annuar Yub hailed the brothers for "revolutionising Malaysian hip-hop and rap genres". He commented, "Although during that era, the Malaysian music industry was largely pioneered by artists and groups that brought pop, rock and ballad rhythms, the trio bucked the trend and created its own phenomenon, thus successfully changing the landscape of the country's music industry". In his column for Free Malaysia Today, Affandi Ramli, who goes by his pen name Ronasina, said that KRU have "a charm that makes them quite influential". He wrote that "they have a formula for success and a recipe for staying relevant until now". Dennis Chua of the New Straits Times described KRU as the "band of brothers" in Malaysian music history. He wrote that they were "defined by electrifying hip-hop beats and catchy pop tunes". Danial Hakim of Sinar Daily wrote, "It is no secret that KRU has been around the Malaysian music industry since the olden days, having performed for countless of fans across multiple generations".

A media critic from Billboard hailed the brothers as the "Malaysia's most enduring R&B-pop group". Brendan Pereira, also from The Straits Times and Hazel Tan of The New Paper heralded KRU as the "Malaysia's answer to Boyzone and Backstreet Boys", while Yong Siew Fern, also from the same publication, described the brothers as "unstoppable" in his review of their Jammin' the Nation tour. Hartati Hassan Basri of Metro Ahad wrote, "A fact that no one can deny is Norman, Yusry and Edry, who called themselves KRU, went through a period of stardom due to their distinctive music and image back then". Faizal Saharuni of Kosmo! wrote, "There is no doubt that everything has been done by KRU, which acts as a pioneer of modern Malay music [...] They succeeded in bringing about significant changes through the taste of local songs, thus opening up more space for various current rhythmic trends". Writing for Sinar Harian, Nurezzatul Aqmar Mustaza in her review of their GenKRU the Finale: One More Time concert, described the KRU brothers' presence in the music industry is "still relevant, still potent and still capable of dominating large-scale stages with international-class production quality".

== Other ventures ==
The KRU brothers founded their own company, KRU Group of Companies to manage their business and career upon their establishment in 1992. They expanded their business with several subsidiaries — KRU Studios, KRU Music and KRU Academy. Under their now-defunct subsidiary, KRU Beverages, the group launched their own carbonated soft drink brand, KRUze in January 1998, until it stopped production in 2001. Its brand name was a play of the word "cruise".

They also diversified their ventures into film production with films such as the Cicak Man series, Duyung, Magika, Hikayat Merong Mahawangsa, and Vikingdom. In 2014, KRU ventured into animation production by set up Kartun Studios, which specialised in production of both 2D and 3D animation series and films. Its first release was the 2014 animated film, Ribbit and followed by Wheely (2018). The group launched their own e-commerce platform called iLike under their subsidiary, KRU Entertainment on 11 October 2020. The platform aims to help well-known celebrities to promote their products online.

== Members ==
- Norman Abdul Halim (born 5 February 1971) – vocals, backing vocals, rapper
- Yusry Abdul Halim (born 15 June 1973) – vocals, backing vocals
- Edry Abdul Halim (born 28 April 1976) – vocals, backing vocals

== Discography ==
Studio albums

- Canggih (1992)
- reKRUed (1993)
- Awas! (1994)
- Awas! da' Soundtrack (1995)
- Ooh! La! La! (1996)
- The Way We Jam (1998)
- Formula Luarbiasa (1999)
- KRUjaan (2002)
- Empayar KRUjaan V2.0 (2002)
- KRUnisme (2005)
- 10 di Skala Richter (2006)
- KRUnomena (2013)
- Kaset (2025)

Studio album as Tyco

- Tyco (2000)

== Filmography ==
=== Film ===
KRU's film credits with year of release, title(s) and role
Year	Title	Role	Notes	Ref(s)
1995	Awas!	Themselves	Feature film debut	
1996	Cinta Metropolitan			

=== Television ===
KRU's television credits with year of release, title(s), role and network
Year	Title	Role	Network	Notes	Ref(s)
1994	In Person... KRU	Themselves	TV3	Guest stars	
1997	Hiburan Minggu Ini	Themselves	TV1	Guest performer	
2002	Cit Cat Azwan Aidilfitri	Themselves	Astro Ria	Guest artist	
2016	MeleTOP	Themselves	Astro Ria	Guest artist/performer	

== Concert tours ==
Malaysia

- ReKRUed Rap Tour (1993–1994)
- Awas! da' Concert (1995)
- KRU Mega Tour '97 (1997)
- Jammin' the Nation (1999–2000)
- Konsert Empayar KRUjaan (2002)
- Konsert 20 Tahun KRU (2012)
- Konsert Gergasi KRU25 (2018)
- GenKRU (2025)
- GenKRU the Finale: One More Time (2025)

Australia

- Proton World Tour (1999)

== Awards and accolades ==
KRU has received numerous awards and nominations. After their debut, they won the Anugerah Bintang Popular Berita Harian for Most Popular Group at the 1995, 1996, 1998 and 1999 ceremony. Their third album, Awas!, won the Anugerah Industri Muzik for Best Vocal Performance in an Album (Group) at the 1995 ceremony. At the 1999 ceremony of the award, KRU won the Kembara Award. Their debut English album The Way We Jam won the Best Engineered Album, while its titular song won the Best Music Video. The group also won the Popular Group Artiste at the Singapore's Popular Music Awards in 1996. In addition, the group also receives five recognitions from the Malaysia Book of Records, including the First Malaysian Artiste to Have a Duet With the Deceased for "Getaran Jiwa" featuring a duet with its original singer P. Ramlee and the First Malaysian Virtual Artiste for Tyco.

== Works cited ==
- KRU (1994). AWAS! [DANGER!] (in Malay). Kuala Lumpur: Kharisma Publications.
