= The House on Autumn Hill =

- Genre: Thriller, Mystery
- Created by: Azhar Amirulhisyam
- Written by: Azhar Amirulhisyam; Ifan Adriansyah Ismail; Sammaria Simanjuntak; Nonny Boenawan; Satpal Kaler
- Directed by: Yusry Abdul Halim
- Starring: Hun Haqeem; Meerqeen; Sara Ali; Syafie Naswip; Fimie Don; Sara Mack Lubis
- Country of origin: Malaysia
- Original language: Malay
- No. of episodes: 10

Production
- Executive producer: Kingsley Warner (Viu)
- Producer: Zurina Ramli
- Production location: Malaysia
- Cinematography: Irwan Munir
- Editor: Johan Bahar
- Camera setup: Multi-camera
- Running time: 50–55 minutes
- Production company: Independent Pictures

Original release
- Network: Viu
- Release: 9 February – 30 March 2023

The House on Autumn Hill (Malay: Nenek Bongkok Tiga) is a 2023 Malaysian web television drama series directed by Yusry Abdul Halim and created by Azhar Amirulhisyam. Starring Hun Haqeem, Meerqeen, Sherie Merlis, Sofia Jane, Sara Ali, and Syafie Naswip, the series premiered on Viu from February 9, 2023, to March 30, 2023, with two episodes airing every Thursday. This series was one of the best web drama series of 2023, winning five major awards at the Asian Academy Creative Awards, including Best Original Production by a Streamer/OTT and Best VFX.

== Synopsis ==
When eight people wake up in a mansion inhabited by an old hunchbacked woman, they soon realize they've become captives, not just within the house and its surrounding forest, but also trapped in an unknown dimension.

With evil threats growing more dangerous, the eight captives are forced to win a series of games created by the old woman, hoping they can one day return to their previous lives.

== Cast ==
- Hun Haqeem as Zamir
- Meerqeen as Adi
- Sherie Merlis as Nenek
- Sofia Jane as Samira
- Sara Ali as Alis
- Syafie Naswip as Sani
- Sara Mack Lubis as Malia
- Rykarl Iskandar as Zaid
- Fimie Don as Mior
- Syazwan Zulkifly as Salim
- Ashraf Muslim as Haikal
- Esma Daniel as Hateem
- Aida Aris as Marni
- Dhia Irdina as Hana (child)
- Hana Thia as Kaira
- Iskandar Syahidan as Hairi
- Khai Sabri as Depressed Man/Taufiq
- Louisa Chong as Aunty Koh
- Khairil Anwar as Adi's father
- Nor Albaniah Raffie as Adi's mother
- Fazlina Ahmad Daud as Taufiq's mother
- Khir Rahman as Land Owner

== Production ==
The House on Autumn Hill was announced as one of five Viu Original series to be aired in 2023 during a press conference on December 1, 2022. Directed by Yusry Abdul Halim, who previously helmed Ganjil and She Was Pretty (Malaysia), this horror series incorporates supernatural elements and has garnered significant buzz on social media. The series was produced by Zurina Ramli under her company, Independent Pictures, which also produced She Was Pretty (Malaysia) and Black Season 2 for Viu. Azhar Amirulhisyam, who wrote several Viu series such as Ganjil and Seribu Nina, created the series. Filming took 55 days to complete.

At the 2023 Asian Academy Creative Awards, The House on Autumn Hill was named the national winner (Malaysia) in five categories, marking the biggest win among all Malaysian productions.

== Accolades ==
Year	Award	Category	Nominee	Result	Ref.
2023	Asian Academy Creative Awards	Best Original Productions by a Streamer/OTT	The House on Autumn Hill	Won (Malaysia)	
2023	Asian Academy Creative Awards	Best Direction (Fiction)	Yusry Abd Halim	Won (Malaysia)	
2023	Asian Academy Creative Awards	Best Actor in a Supporting Role	Syafie Naswip	Won (Malaysia)	
2023	Asian Academy Creative Awards	Best Editing	Johan Bahar	Won (Grand)	
2023	Asian Academy Creative Awards	Best Visual or Special FX in TV Series or Feature Film	Yureka FX	Won (Malaysia)	
2023	Asian Television Awards	Best Digital Fiction Program/Series	The House on Autumn Hill	Nominated	
2023	Asian Television Awards	Best Screenplay	Azhar Amirulhisyam	Nominated	

== Release ==
The House on Autumn Hill began airing simultaneously on Viu and Astro Ria starting February 9, 2023, with two consecutive episodes broadcast.
