= KRU Mega Tour '97 =

1997 concert tour by KRU

- Tour by KRU
- Promotional poster
- Associated album: KRUmania
- Start date: 17 May 1997
- End date: 27 December 1997
- Legs: 4
- No. of shows: 23 (Malaysia); 1 (Brunei); 24 Total
- Guests: Elite

KRU concert chronology
- Awas! da' Concert (1995); KRU Mega Tour '97 (1997); Jammin' the Nation (1999–2000)

KRU Mega Tour '97 (originally titled KRUmania Mega Tour '97) was a concert tour by Malaysian boy band KRU in support of their compilation album KRUmania. Sponsored by Peter Stuyvesant Travel, the tour was originally scheduled for 16 locations across Malaysia. It began on 17 May 1997 at the MBJB Indoor Stadium, Johor Bahru, and concluded on 4 October at Stadium Negara, Kuala Lumpur. Due to demand, additional concerts took place on 10, 17 and 27 December. The tour received generally positive reviews from music critics, who praised KRU's showmanship and vocal abilities.

== Background and development ==
Following the success of their 1995 tour, Awas! da' Concert, KRU announced that they will embarked on their another tour to mark the group's fifth year in music industry, aptly titled KRUmania Mega Tour '97, which was their third headlined concert. They will toured 15 locations nationwide for 3 months, which was later extended to 19 locations for 6 months. They also released their debut compilation album, entitled KRUmania on 3 March 1997 to coincide the tour. For their tour, the KRU brothers utilised the Turbo Sound Flashlights audio system which can accommodate a capacity of up to 30,000 audiences for a single performance. The tour, which cost around RM7 million, featured advanced sound and lighting technology operated by specialists from Singapore, Australia, and Japan. Originally titled KRUmania Mega Tour '97, KRU changed the concert name to KRU Mega Tour '97 and dropped the word 'mania' upon the Malaysian Government's order. Peter Stuyvesant Travel become the tour's main sponsor.

== Concert synopsis ==
The concert opened with a dance performance, followed by Elite, KRU's first-ever signed girl group, who performed five of their hit songs including "Tak Tahu", "Catwalk", "Mungkin Belum Kau Rasa", "Manisnya Senyumanmu", and "G.I.G". The KRU brothers later took the stage dressed in prison-themed outfits, performing "Awas!", "Mengerti", "Di Dalam Dilema", and "Freaky G". They continued with a series of popular songs including "Janji Tinggal Janji", "Aneh", "Salah Siapa", "E'nuff Eez E'nuff", "Untukmu", "2", "U Make My Day", "Negatif", "Semuanya OK", and "Ooh! La! La!", during which they appeared in The Beatles-inspired costumes.

A medley segment titled Maniamedley was presented towards the end of the concert, featuring "KRU is Wild", "Go! KRU (T.R.R.G.)", "2020", "Getaran Jiwa", and "Fanatik". During this segment, Norman reads a short profile of the late P. Ramlee, followed by a rendition of "Getaran Jiwa" as a tribute to the legendary artist. The concert concluded with the song "2020", symbolising KRU's support for the Wawasan 2020, introduced by Prime Minister Mahathir Mohamad.

== Critical reception and recordings ==
The concert was met with positive responses from critics and the media, who praised KRU's energetic performance and strong stage presence. Berita Harian described the concert as "a captivating two-hour performance that thrilled fans and showcased the group’s powerful live performance". Harian Metro praised the show, calling it "energetic and powerful", and noting that it gave "immense satisfaction to more than 5,000 audiences".

In 1998, a live recording of the tour was released in VCD by EMI Music Malaysia, featuring 13 live renditions of the group's greatest hits, a live interview segment, and a short feature titled The KRUmania Crisis. The tour's live recording also comes with free KRU sticker.

== Commercial performance ==
The concert tour was a commercial success, with 20,000 tickets sold before the first show began. The first concert at the MBJB Indoor Stadium in Johor Bahru was attended by 5,000 people, while the last concert at Stadium Negara in Kuala Lumpur drew 8,000 fans.

== Controversies ==
KRUmania Mega Tour '97 began in Johor Bahru on 17 May 1997 with a sold-out concert attended by approximately 5,000 fans. The performance received positive reviews and marked the start of the tour, which was originally scheduled to conclude on 6 September 1997 at Stadium Negara in Kuala Lumpur.

However, controversy arose when the second concert in Muar, Johor was cancelled after local authorities withdrew its permit, following complaints from members of the public, organisations, and political groups who claimed that the concert was inappropriate and could negatively influence youths. Reports from the Johor Bahru concert, however, indicated that KRU's performance did not contain any improper elements.

The Kedah State Government later announced that the concert would not be allowed in the state, saying there was public opposition and concern over the word KRUmania, which was said to mean "madness". As a result, the concert scheduled in Sungai Petani on 7 June 1997 was cancelled. The Perlis concert, scheduled in Kangar on 21 June 1997, was also cancelled, forcing KRU to find new venues and reschedule several tour dates.

In response, the then-Deputy Prime Minister Anwar Ibrahim called on state governments to reconsider their bans, stating that concerts could continue under stricter security measures and clearer guidelines. Following this, KRU members Norman, Yusry, and Edry Abdul Halim met with the then-Minister of Culture, Arts and Tourism Abdul Kadir Sheikh Fadzir to resolve the issue.

The group agreed to follow the conditions set by the state governments and local authorities, including removing the word 'mania' from the tour's name, renaming it to KRU Mega Tour ’97 and changing promotional materials that were considered inappropriate.

Shortly after, the Cabinet approved the continuation of the concerts nationwide, as long as KRU followed the performance rules and the audience behaved properly. The KRU Mega Tour '97 eventually concluded on 4 October 1997 at Stadium Negara in Kuala Lumpur.

In later years, Norman revealed that the bans and cancellations during the KRUmania Mega Tour '97 had caused financial difficulties for KRU, as the group had taken loans and secured sponsorships to fund the tour and pay their staff.

== Set list ==
The set list is adapted from a concert in Stadium Tertutup Indera Mulia, Majlis Bandaraya Ipoh.

Elite segment

1. "Tak Tahu"
2. "Catwalk"
3. "Mungkin Belum Kau Rasa"
4. "Manisnya Senyumanmu"
5. "G.I.G."

KRU segment

1. "Awas!"
2. "Mengerti"
3. "Di Dalam Dilema"
4. "Freaky G"
5. "Janji Tinggal Janji"
6. "Aneh"
7. "Salah Siapa"
8. "E Nuff Eezz E Nuff"
9. "Untukmu"
10. "2"
11. "U Make My Day"
12. "Negatif"
13. "Semuanya OK"
14. "Ooh! La! La!"
15. "Maniamedley"
  - "KRU is Wild"
  - "Go! KRU (T.R.R.G.)"
  - "2020"
  - "Fanatik"
  - "Getaran Jiwa"

== Tour dates ==
List of tours, showing date, city, venue, and attendance (Note: Changes to the date, venue, time, or concert cancellations may occur.)
Date	City	Venue	Attendance	Notes	Ref.
Leg 1
17 May 1997	Johor Bahru, Johor	MBJB Indoor Stadium	5,000		
24 May 1997	Muar, Johor			Authority did not allow	
7 June 1997	Sungai Petani, Kedah	Dewan Besar Cina Lip Seang		The state government did not allow	
10–11 June 1997	Kota Kinabalu, Sabah				
14 June 1997	Seberang Jaya, Penang	Seberang Jaya Expo Park			
June 1997	Labuan				
17 June 1997	Sandakan, Sabah				
20 June 1997	Tawau, Sabah				
21 June 1997	Kangar, Perlis	Sheikh Ahmad Stadium		The state government did not allow	
25 June 1997	Brunei				
Leg 2
6 July 1997	Ipoh, Perak	Indera Mulia Indoor Stadium	5,000		
11 July 1997	Seremban, Negeri Sembilan	Seremban Municipal Council Hall	1,500		
19 July 1997	Klang, Selangor	Hamzah Hall		Authority did not allow	
2 August 1997	Kuantan, Pahang	Indera Mahkota Stadium			
16 August 1997	Malacca	Pay Fong Chinese School General Hall			
23 August 1997	Taiping, Perak				
28 August 1997	Petaling Jaya, Selangor	Petaling Jaya Civic Hall	1,500		
Leg 3
13 September 1997	Sungai Nibong, Penang	Sungai Nibong Fiesta Square	3,000		
21 September 1997	Pasir Gudang, Johor	Pasir Gudang Indoor Stadium			
4 October 1997	Kuala Lumpur	Stadium Negara	8,000		
Leg 4
10 December 1997	Kajang, Selangor	Kajang Stadium		Additional show (Note: Free admission.)	
17 December 1997	Kuala Pilah, Negeri Sembilan	Kuala Pilah District Council Field		Additional show	
24 December 1997	Bayan Lepas, Penang	Penang International Sports Arena		Additional show	
27 December 1997	Shah Alam, Selangor	Tapak Ekspo Shah Alam		Additional show	

== Personnel ==
- KRU – performer
- Elite – guest performer
- Dance Machines - dancer
- Sponsored by – Peter Stuyvesant Travel
