= Cinta Metropolitan (soundtrack) =

Cinta Metropolitan OST

Soundtrack album / Studio album by KRU
- Released: September 1996
- Recorded: 1995–1996
- Genre: Pop; Hip-hop; R&B
- Length: 51:00
- Label: EMI Music Malaysia
- Producer: KRU

KRU chronology
Ooh! La! La! (1996)	Cinta Metropolitan OST (1996)	KRUmania (1997)

Cinta Metropolitan OST is a soundtrack album by Malaysian boy band KRU for the 1996 film of the same name, which starred the KRU brothers. It was released in September 1996 by EMI Music Malaysia. The soundtrack consists of 21 tracks, including 10 songs and one remix from their fifth studio album, Ooh! La! La!!, with the remaining tracks featuring dialogue excerpts from the film.

== Production ==
The album was produced by KRU between 1995 and 1996. The soundtrack contains 10 songs and one remix taken from their previous album, Ooh! La! La!, which was released seven months earlier, while the remaining tracks feature dialogue excerpts from the film. The total reported cost for the soundtrack and film promotion was RM 100,000.

== Track listing ==
All songs written by Norman, Yusry and Edry Abdul Halim; remaining tracks contain dialogue excerpts from the film

No.	Title	Length
1.	"Apa Saja (Versi Cinta Metropolitan)"	4:16
2.	"Business Tak Merugikan... (Interlude)"	0:16
3.	"Ooh! La! La!"	3:31
4.	"Nurul, Haris, Irwan dalam Dilema..."	0:21
5.	"Semuanya OK"	3:58
6.	"Semua Orang Ada Masalah (Interlude)"	0:41
7.	"Balada Hati"	4:22
8.	"Duit Palsu (Interlude)"	0:25
9.	"Diari Metropolitan (feat. Elite)"	4:20
10.	"Markas Farouk"	0:31
11.	"Girlfriend’s Girlfriend"	4:11
12.	"Countdown (Interlude)"	1:11
13.	"Boom!"	3:58
14.	"Hamba Duit (Interlude)"	0:30
15.	"Persetankannya"	3:57
16.	"Lu... Lu Punya Hal! Gua... Gua Punya Hal!"	1:02
17.	"Apa Saja"	3:59
18.	"Scene 23"	0:33
19.	"Freaky G"	4:00
20.	"Cinta Metropolitan (Interlude)"	0:54
21.	"Ulangkan Sekali Lagi"	4:15
Total length:		51:00

== Release and reception ==
The soundtrack was released in September 1996 concurrently with the release of KRU's second film, Cinta Metropolitan.

The soundtrack received underwhelming reviews from local critics. Writing for Harian Metro, Saniboey Mohd Ismail described the album as "lacklustre" and criticized the frequent inclusion of film dialogue between songs, noting that this trend had become overused in Malaysian soundtrack albums.

== Release history ==
Region	Release date	Format	Label
Malaysia	1996	CD, Digital download	EMI Music Malaysia
