= Ooh! La! La! =

Studio album by KRU
- Released: 19 March 1996
- Recorded: 1995 – 1996
- Studio: KRU Studios
- Genre: Pop; Hip-hop
- Length: 43:53
- Label: EMI Music Malaysia
- Producer: KRU

KRU chronology
Awas! da' Soundtrack (1995)	Ooh! La! La! (1996)	Cinta Metropolitan OST (1996)

Singles from Ooh! La! La!
- 1. "Ooh! La! La!" Released: 1996; 2. "Apa Saja" Released: 1996; 3. "Diari Metropolitan" Released: 1996

Ooh! La! La! is the fifth studio album by Malaysian boy band, KRU. It was released on 19 March 1996 by EMI Music Malaysia. The album has sold over 150,000 copies upon released and certified multi-platinum and in 1997, won two awards at the 4th Anugerah Industri Muzik.

== Production ==
Ooh! La! La! was heavily influenced by KRU. The album's title and titular song, according to KRU, it is an expression in French language which means either "beautiful" or "amazing". Edry said that their new tidier image is very suitable for the album.

The album was recorded at their own recording studio in Kuala Lumpur. Like their previous albums, KRU also recorded English tracks for the album. "Diari Metropolitan", featuring Malaysian girl group, Elite, who sang the chorus. Jaquei provided backing vocals for "Freaky G". The arrangement was handled by KRU, with Edry serves as a recording supervisor and mixer. The mixing process was done in Los Angeles, United States.

== Release and reception ==
Ooh! La! La! was well received upon its release, selling over 90,000 copies within just four days. The album's sales was then increased to 110,000 copies. By July 1996, the album has sold over 120,000 copies. Its sales figures were then increased to 150,000 as of October and being certified multi-platinum. Music videos were released for the titular song and "Apa Saja". 8 of the 12 songs in the album were used as a soundtrack for 1996 film, Cinta Metropolitan, directed by Julie Dahlan and starring the brothers themselves.

The album's first single of the same name was among of 12 music videos was included in a special music video collection, Video Files, produced and released by EMI. Its second single, "Apa Saja" was bought by Portrait, an American R&B vocal group, and released in the North American market as the English-language "Will You Still Love Me" and included in their third album, Picturesque. At the 4th Anugerah Industri Muzik, which has held on 22 March 1997, the album won two awards, namely the Best Album and the Best Engineered Album.

== Track listing ==
All tracks are written by Norman, Yusry and Edry Abdul Halim.

No.	Title	Length
1.	"Anti-Lanun"	0:55
2.	"Ooh! La! La!"	3:31
3.	"Semuanya OK"	4:45
4.	"Apa Saja"	4:16
5.	"Petaling Street"	0:39
6.	"Diari Metropolitan" (feat. Elite)	3:41
7.	"Girlfriend's Girlfriend"	4:12
8.	"Wotsup"	0:20
9.	"Boom!"	3:57
10.	"Persetankannya"	3:56
11.	"Balada Hati"	3:50
12.	"Freaky G"	3:25
13.	"Apa Saja Reprise"	0:39
14.	"Ulangkan Sekali Lagi"	5:26
Total length:		43:53

== Personnel ==
Credits adapted from Ooh! La! La! booklet liner notes.

- KRU - vocals, backing vocals, composer, arranger, producer
- Elite - vocals
- Jaquei - backing vocals
- Shah Slam - guitar
- Reggie Hamilton - bass
- Mukti Abdul Hamid - violin
- Jimmy Sax - saxophone
- Mohd Arzmy - executive producer
- Syed Yusof Wafa - make-up
- Edry Abdul Halim - mixer, recording supervisor
- Jon Gass - mixer
- Martin Horenburg - mixer
- Steve Hall - mastering
- Izan - recording supervisor
- Tapa - design, design concept
- A.D. Ho - photography

== Release history ==
Region	Release date	Format	Label
Malaysia	19 March 1996	CD, Digital download	EMI Music Malaysia
