= Konsert 20 Tahun KRU =

- Concert by KRU
- Location: Kuala Lumpur, Malaysia
- Venue: Neverland, Orange Club
- Date: 10 June 2012
- No. of shows: 1
- Guests: VIP; Baby Shima; Amirah (Tilu); Kamalia; Mojo]; Azhar; Forteen; Ika Band; Adam; X-Factor; Elite; Sofazr; Tomok; Jaclyn Victor
- Attendance: 1,300+

KRU concert chronology
- Konsert Empayar KRUjaan (2002); Konsert 20 Tahun KRU (2012); Konsert Gergasi KRU25 (2018)

Konsert 20 Tahun KRU was the sixth concert by Malaysian boy band KRU, held on 10 June 2012 at Neverland, Orange Club, Kuala Lumpur, to celebrate their 20th anniversary in the Malaysian music industry. It was their first live performance in ten years since Konsert Empayar KRUjaan in 2002.

The concert also featured performances by KRU Music artists and the group's past collaborators. The set list included a selection of songs written and produced by KRU. The concert was supported by Hot FM (official radio partner), Media Hiburan (official media partner), and Gua.com.my (official online portal).

== Background and development ==
The concert was organized to celebrate KRU's two decades in the music industry and to appreciate fans for their continued support. The idea came after Edry Abdul Halim suggested to his brother, Norman Abdul Halim, to stage a comeback following their last concert, Konsert Empayar KRUjaan, in 2002. Tickets for the concert were made available through product redemption, where fans could obtain exclusive entry passes by purchasing KRU products worth RM50 or more from KRU official online store, United Studios. In addition, tickets were also distributed as prizes through contests organized by Hot FM and Gua.com.my.

== Concert synopsis ==
The concert began with VIP performing Lagu Sedih, followed by Baby Shima with Jahat and Cinta Hello Kitty. After that, Amirah from Tilu performed Ku Bukan Aku, while Kamalia presented Asmaradana. This was followed by Mojo with their hit single Andai Ku Bercinta Lagi and Azhar with a cover of Shahir's song Kebahagiaan Dalam Perpisahan. The group Forteen then performed a cover of Andai Kau Pergi and their own hit Berdua Bersatu. The first half of the concert concluded with Ika Band performing Permata Pemotong Permata (PPP). During the middle of the concert, the audience was shown a special video produced by KRU Studios, which included a teaser for the film 29 Februari, starring Remy Ishak. The film was scheduled for release on 30 August 2012.

The second half of the concert began with Adam performing KRU's “Janji Tinggal Janji” and “Enuff Ezz Enuff”, followed by X-Factor with “Sehangat Api”. Elite then took the stage with their popular numbers “G.I.G.”, “Trauma”, and “Manisnya Senyumanmu”, followed by Sofazr performing “Pencinta Terbaik” and a rock version of “Oh La La”. Tomok then performed “Arjuna” while Jaclyn Victor closed the guest artist segment with “Sebelah Jiwaku” and “Sedetik Lebih”. A special segment featured a congratulatory message from Tun Dr. Mahathir Mohamad, shown on the big screen as a tribute to KRU's contribution to the Malaysian entertainment industry.

The concert concluded with a finale performance by KRU, featuring a medley of their greatest hits including “Mengerti”, “Awas”, “Oh La La”, “Fanatik”, “Untukmu”, “Apa Saja”, “Jangan Lafazkan”, and “Terhangat di Pasaran”. During the closing, the group invited their parents, Zarina Fenner and Abdul Halim, to the stage to receive bouquets of flowers as a token of appreciation. A slideshow displaying the KRU family's childhood photos was also shown on the big screen. The concert ended with performances of “Ganas” and “Tiga Kata”, marking the end of the concert.

== Set list ==
1. "Lagu Sedih" – VIP
2. "Jahat" – Baby Shima
3. "Cinta Hello Kitty" – Baby Shima
4. "Ku Bukan Aku" – Amirah (Tilu)
5. "Asmaradana" – Kamalia
6. "Andai Ku Bercinta Lagi" – Mojo
7. "Kebahagiaan Dalam Perpisahan" – Azhar
8. "Andai Kau Pergi" – Forteen
9. "Berdua Bersatu" – Forteen
10. "Permata Pemotong Permata (PPP)" – Ika Band
11. "Janji Tinggal Janji" – Adam
12. "Enuff Ezz Enuff" – Adam
13. "Sehangat Api" – X Factor
14. "G.I.G." – Elite
15. "Trauma" – Elite
16. "Manisnya Senyumanmu" – Elite
17. "Pencinta Terbaik" – Sofazr
18. "Oh La La" (rock version) – Sofazr
19. "Arjuna" – Tomok
20. "Sebelah Jiwaku" – Jaclyn Victor
21. "Sedetik Lebih" – Jaclyn Victor
22. "Mengerti" – KRU
23. "Awas" – KRU
24. "Oh La La" – KRU
25. "Fanatik" – KRU
26. "Untukmu" – KRU
27. "Apa Saja" – KRU
28. "Jangan Lafazkan" – KRU
29. "Terhangat di Pasaran" – KRU
30. "Ganas" – KRU
31. "Tiga Kata" – KRU

== Reception ==
The concert was well received by fans and local entertainment media. Harian Metro described the event as “a long-awaited celebration for fans,” while Berita Harian referred to it as “a nostalgic evening that rekindled memories of KRU’s musical journey over two decades.” Attendance was reported to have exceeded 1,300 people, filling the venue to capacity.

== Show dates ==
Date	City	Country	Venue	Attendance
10 June 2012	Kuala Lumpur	Malaysia	Neverland, Orange Club	1,300+

== Personnel ==
- KRU – performer
- VIP – guest performer
- Baby Shima – guest performer
- Amirah (Tilu) – guest performer
- Kamalia – guest performer
- Mojo – guest performer
- Azhar – guest performer
- Forteen – guest performer
- Ika Band – guest performer
- Adam – guest performer
- X Factor – guest performer
- Elite – guest performer
- Sofazr – guest performer
- Tomok – guest performer
- Jaclyn Victor – guest performer
- Hot FM – official radio partner
- Media Hiburan – official media partner
- Gua.com.my - official portal
- Neverland @ Orange, Kuala Lumpur – venue
