= Konsert Empayar KRUjaan =

2002 concert by KRU

- Concert by KRU
- Venue: Dataran Merdeka, Kuala Lumpur, Malaysia
- Associated album: KRUjaan; Empayar KRUjaan V2.0
- Date: 26 October 2002
- No. of shows: 1
- Guests: Phyne Ballerz; Pretty Ugly; Ezlynn; Chi Dr. Kronik; Erra Fazira
- Attendance: 50,000

KRU concert chronology
- Jammin' the Nation (1999–2000); Konsert Empayar KRUjaan (2002); Konsert 20 Tahun KRU (2012)

Konsert Empayar KRUjaan was a live concert by Malaysian boy band, KRU. The concert was held on 26 October 2002 at the Dataran Merdeka, Kuala Lumpur, in conjunction with the group's tenth anniversary in the Malaysian music industry and as support of their ninth studio album, KRUjaan and its reissue edition, Empayar KRUjaan V2.0. The set list includes songs from their previous albums.

== Background ==
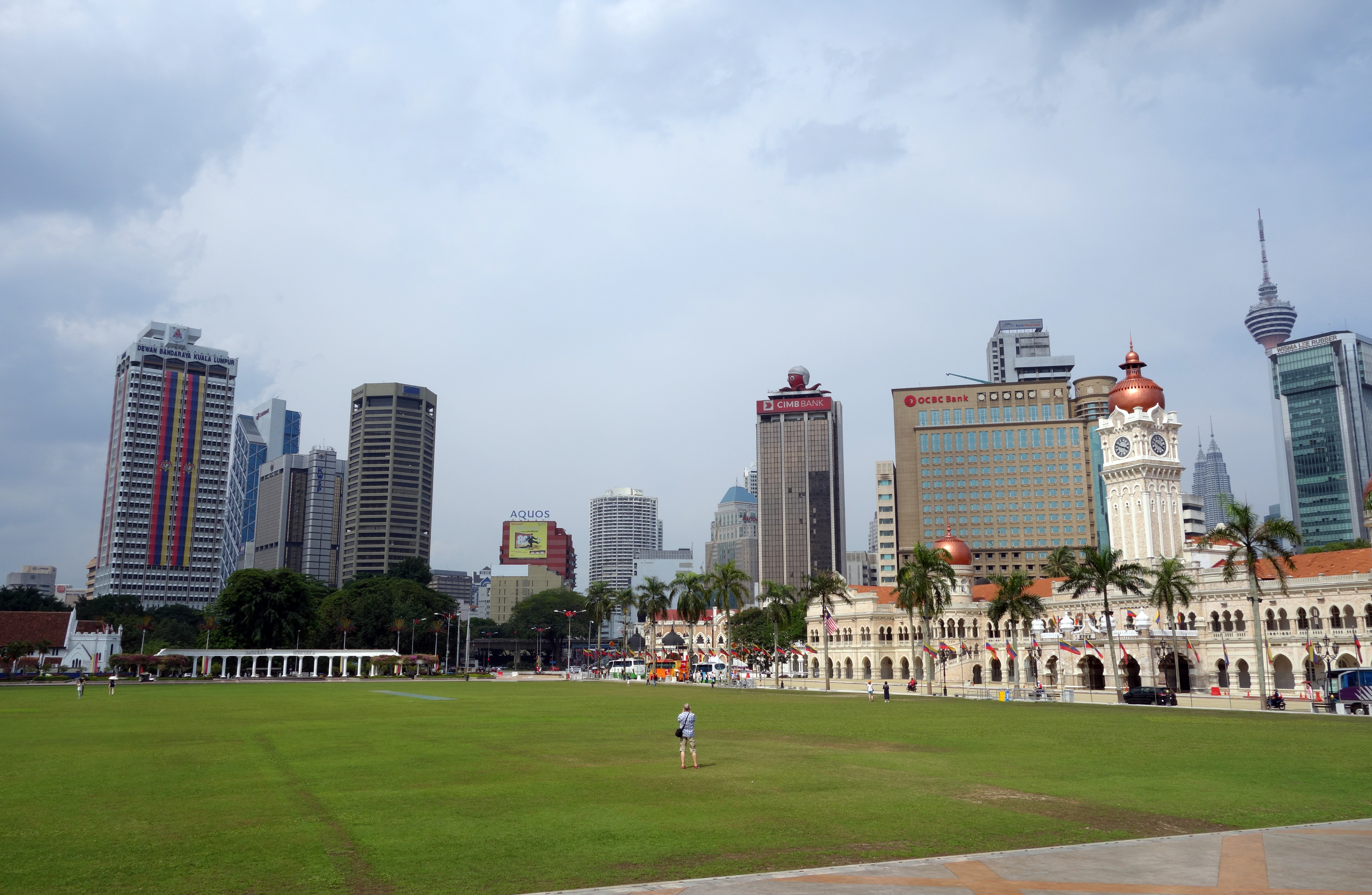
Dataran Merdeka in Kuala Lumpur, where the concert took place.

Konsert Empayar KRUjaan was the fifth major concert staged by KRU, following their Asian tour Jammin' the Nation from 1999 to 2000. The concert was sponsored by Malaysian carmaker Perodua, with production costs reported to be around RM500,000, and admission was free to the public. It also marks KRU's 10th year in the Malaysian music industry.

The show featured a total of 19 songs, ranging from the group's early hits such as "Mengerti" to their then-latest single, "Perpisahan Terasing". Performances were accompanied by professional dancers from DanceKRU and Dance Machines, while Phyne Ballerz and Pretty Ugly, a newly signed under the KRU Music Group, provided backing vocals.

The concert also featured guest appearances by several artists under KRU Records. Singer Ezlynn opened the night by performing her debut single "Hi Hi Bye Bye" for the first time, followed by Chi from Dr. Kronik. Actress-singer Erra Fazira made a special appearance, performing a duet with Yusry on the ballad "Ucapkanlah". Limited edition merchandise, including albums, sweatshirts, T-shirts, caps and memorabilia, was also made available at the venue.

== Reception and recordings ==
The concert attracted an estimated crowd of around 50,000 people, making it one of KRU's largest-scale performances during that period.

The event was recorded by KRU Motion Pictures and subsequently released in VCD format by KRU Music Group in 2003.

== Set list ==
Empayar 1

1. Intro
2. "Awas"
3. "Mengerti"
4. "Di Dalam Dilema"
5. "Ohh La La!"
6. "Untukmu" / "Janji Tinggal Janji"
7. "Negatif"
8. "Fanatik"
9. "Formula"
10. "The Way We Jam"

Empayar 2

1. "Apa Saja"
2. "Fobia" / "Luarbiasa"
3. "Jangan Lafazkan"
4. "With You"
5. "Bidadari"
6. "Ucapkanlah"
7. "Impak Maksima"

== Show dates ==
Date	City	Country	Venue	Attendance
26 October 2002	Kuala Lumpur	Malaysia	Dataran Merdeka	50,000
