= Konsert Gergasi KRU25 =

- Concert by KRU
- Promotional poster
- Location: Kuala Lumpur, Malaysia
- Venue: Istana Budaya
- Associated album: Gergasi
- Start date: 4 May 2018
- End date: 6 May 2018
- No. of shows: 3
- Guests: Joe Flizzow; Jaclyn Victor
- Attendance: 3,000

KRU concert chronology
- Konsert 20 Tahun KRU (2012); Konsert Gergasi KRU25 (2018); GenKRU (2025)

Konsert Gergasi KRU25 was the seventh concert by the Malaysian boy band KRU in support of their compilation album Gergasi. It is also a farewell concert, as the group announced, in April 2018, their decision to disband after their final concert in 2018. The concert, sponsored by Perodua, was held for three days at Istana Budaya, Kuala Lumpur, from 4 to 6 May 2018, to celebrate the group's 25th anniversary.

== Background and development ==
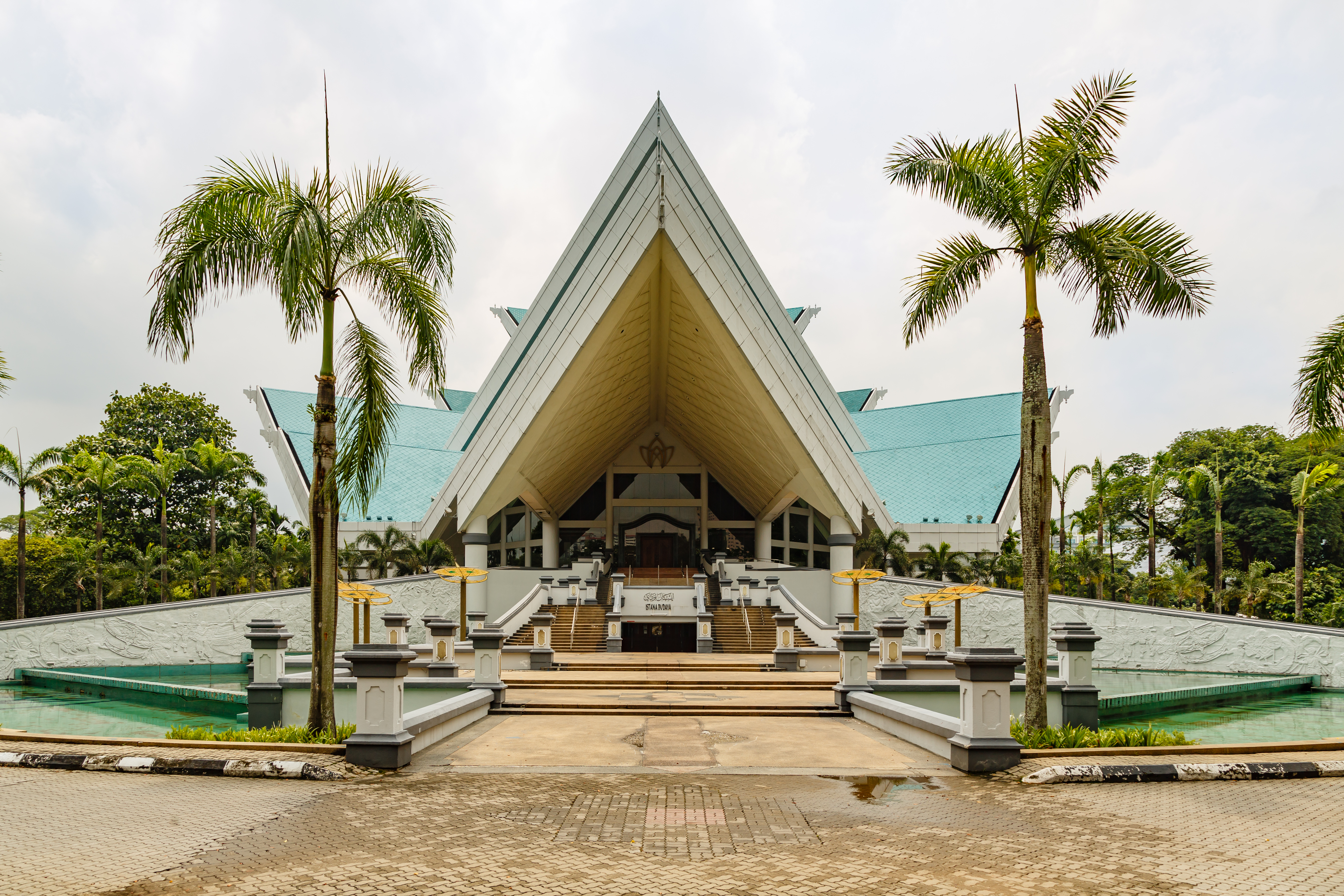
Istana Budaya in Kuala Lumpur, where the concert took place.

The 25th anniversary celebration of KRU began on 6 August 2016 with Konsert KRU25 at the Concert Hall, The Esplanade, Singapore, which attracted over 1,200 fans with sold-out tickets. After that, they released a compilation album titled Gergasi in 2018, featuring 30 of their most popular songs and their last official recording before disbanded, "Tahan Lama", a duet with Joe Flizzow.

On 18 April 2018, KRU announced their disbandment after their last concert, the Konsert Gergasi KRU 25 which was take place at Istana Budaya for three days from 4 to 6 May 2018, with 80 percent of tickets have been sold out. Norman said he along with Yusry and Edry have reached the decision and agreed to disband KRU after exactly 25 years of being active in music industry. They also informed that there were also no plans for KRU to reunited in the future as the brothers concentrated on their own careers and personal lives respectively.

== Concert synopsis ==
The concert ran for two hours and featured 18 songs. From a production standpoint, the stage was designed with a modern concept, including three adjustable staircases, three giant LED screens, and triangle-themed visuals. Their costumes were specially designed by well-known fashion designer Jovian Mandagie. The performance was arranged like a storytelling journey, combining live music and nostalgic moments from KRU’s 25-year career.

The concert opened with The Way We Jam and continued with hits like "Awas", "Terhangat di Pasaran", "Untukmu", "Gadisku", and "Negatif". They were supported by dancers from Sabahan All Stars and special appearance by DanceKRU. In between performances, a touching photo slideshow revisited memorable moments with fans over the decades. KRU also paid tribute to DanceKRU, their longtime dance crew of 25 years. In addition, the KRU brothers also shared jokes and interesting stories from their career.

The concert also featured guest performances, with Joe Flizzow joining KRU on stage to perform "Oh! La! La!", while Jaclyn Victor delivered a powerful duet with KRU in "Di Pintu Syurga". The concert ended with "Fanatik", where KRU wore glowing LED costumes. Guest performers returned to the stage to close the night together. The finale was symbolic, as the audience gave KRU a standing ovation to honor their contribution to music for over 20 years.

== Reception and recordings ==
The concert received positive reviews from local media with all three shows sold out and drawing 1,000 fans each night.

The live recording of Konsert Gergasi KRU25 was released in DVD format in 2018, featuring the full concert along with documentary-style visuals.

== Set list ==
1. "The Way We Jam"
2. "Awas"
3. "Terhangat di Pasaran"
4. "Untukmu"
5. "Janji Tinggal Janji"
6. "Negatif"
7. "Oh! La! La!"
8. "Di Pintu Syurga"
9. "Mengerti"
10. "2"
11. "Balada Hati"
12. "Babe"
13. "Dekat Padamu"
14. "Hingga ke Jannah"
15. "Apa Saja"
16. "Di Dalam Dilema"
17. "Jangan Lafazkan"
18. "Fanatik"

== Personnel ==
- KRU – performer
- Joe Flizzow – guest performer
- Jaclyn Victor – guest performer
- Acmal Ibrahim – concert producer
- Norman Abdul Halim – executive producer
- Shireen M. Hashim – executive producer
- Lisa Surihani – executive producer
- Yusry Abdul Halim – music director
- Jovian Mandagie – fashion designer
- Shah – guitar
- Syafiq – guitar
- Kelly – bass
- Ujang – drums
- Nizam – percussion
- Ude – keyboard
- Farid – saxophone
- Perodua – sponsor
- Hot FM – official radio station
- Kool FM – official radio station
- Universal Music Malaysia – distributor
- KRU Music – label

== Show dates ==
Date	City	Country	Venue	Attendance
4–6 May 2018	Kuala Lumpur	Malaysia	Istana Budaya	Sold Out
