= Awas! da' Soundtrack =

Soundtrack album / Studio album by KRU
- Released: 15 June 1995
- Recorded: November 1994 – April 1995
- Studio: KRU Mini Studio; Channel 11 Studio
- Genre: Pop; Hip-hop; R&B
- Length: 54:24
- Label: EMI Music Malaysia
- Producer: KRU

KRU chronology
Awas! (1994)	Awas! da' Soundtrack (1995)	Ooh! La! La! (1996)

Singles from Awas! da' Soundtrack
- 1. "Negatif" Released: June 1995; 2. "I'll Be Waiting" Released: October 1995

Awas! da' Soundtrack is a fourth studio album by Malaysian boy band, KRU and a soundtrack album for the 1995 film of the same name starring the KRU brothers. It was released on 15 June 1995 by EMI Music Malaysia. The soundtrack consists of 11 new tracks and rearrangements of two songs from their third album and debut EP, Awas!.

== Production ==
For the album, KRU experimented in order to create something different from their previous albums. Awas! da' Soundtrack contains 11 new songs while the remaining two are rearrangements of songs from their third album and debut extended play (EP), Awas!, namely "Di Dalam Dilema" and "Awas!", which both are the remixed versions. They spent about RM70,000 to produce the soundtrack. Norman said of the soundtrack album: "We are especially pleased with the harmonising ad-libbing and delivery in the songs. We really concentrated on the album and this is the best we can give".

The album was recorded at their own studio in Kuala Lumpur and produced by the KRU brothers themselves, which they also handles arrangement and serves as the recording engineer. The mixing process was done at the Los Angeles, California, United States by Martin Horenburg and mastered by Bernie Grundman in Hollywood, California.

== Artwork ==
The cover art photography was designed by Colybrand Communications and features the KRU brothers standing on the railway tracks at an unspecified location in Malaysia. In the booklet there are also images of scenes taken from the Awas! movie.

== Track listing ==
All tracks are written by Norman, Yusry and Edry Abdul Halim.

No.	Title	Length
1.	"Da’ Ghetto"	1:10
2.	"Salah Siapa"	3:45
3.	"Malam Kita"	4:23
4.	"2"	4:07
5.	"Sack Da' Boss"	3:40
6.	"Kehilanganmu"	5:31
7.	"Vendetta"	3:56
8.	"Aneh"	3:59
9.	"I'll Be Waiting"	4:34
10.	"Negatif"	3:54
11.	"Emilia"	5:09
12.	"Di Dalam Dilema" (Latin Mix)	5:03
13.	"Awas" (LP Mix)	5:07
Total length:		54:24

== Release and reception ==
Awas! da' Soundtrack was released as a follow-up to their third album, Awas! on 15 June 1995, three months prior to the release of their debut film, Awas!. A special edition of the soundtrack also was released with the gold disc design and the booklet is in black and red. Its promo and sampler version was released with only five tracks included. The soundtrack was re-released on 21 September 2017 with the album design remains unchanged.

To promote the soundtrack, KRU embarked on their Awas da Concert series, with the first leg began in Datuk Sheikh Ahmad Stadium in Kangar, Perlis on 14 July and ended in Stadium Negara on 25 August.

== Release history ==
Region	Release date	Format	Label
Malaysia	15 June 1995	CD, Digital download	EMI Music Malaysia

== Works cited ==
- KRU (1994). AWAS! [DANGER!] (in Malay). Kuala Lumpur: Kharisma Publications.
