= GenKRU =

2025 concert tour by KRU

- Tour by KRU
- Promotional poster
- Location: Bukit Jalil, Kuala Lumpur, Malaysia; Singapore
- Venue: Axiata Arena; The Star Performing Arts Centre
- Start date: 3 May 2025
- End date: 26 June 2025
- No. of shows: 4 (Malaysia); 1 (Singapore); 5 Total
- Guests: Elite; Adam Mat Saman; Nico; AC Mizal; Feminin; 4U2C; Abon
- Attendance: 30,000

KRU concert chronology
- Konsert Gergasi KRU25 (2018); GenKRU (2025); GenKRU the Finale: One More Time (2025)

GenKRU was a concert tour by Malaysian boy band, KRU. The concert, organised by Icon Entertainment, was held at the Axiata Arena in Bukit Jalil, Kuala Lumpur for two weeks and four nights from 3 to 11 May 2025, while the last leg of the tour was held at The Star Performing Arts Centre in Singapore on 26 June. It is their first live performances in seven years since Konsert Gergasi KRU25 (2018). The set list featured songs taken from KRU's discography as well as songs from other artists. It received positive feedback and reviews from concert reviewers and critics who praised KRU's vocals and overall showmanship. A follow-up concert, GenKRU the Finale: One More Time was held on 22 November at the Bukit Jalil National Hockey Stadium.

== Background and development ==
The Axiata Arena in Bukit Jalil, Kuala Lumpur, where the concert took place.

The idea for the GenKRU concert began in November 2022 when event manager and founder of Icon Entertainment, Iman Tang reached out to the KRU brothers by sending messages to Yusry, but he replied to him that they have been retired. At that time, Yusry himself focus on his directorial career, while his two brothers Norman managing their businesses and Edry resided in the United Kingdom. Iman, however, never gave up and continued to persuaded the brothers. In September 2024, after a much persuasion, the KRU brothers finally agreed to embarked the concert. Iman, who is an avid fan of KRU and grew up with their songs, said he insisted to brought back the brothers on stage as he believed that many of KRU's fans who have been "longing" for their presence on stage, while described them as an iconic music act. He said: "This concert is not just about entertainment, but also about paying tribute to the timeless legacy of KRU".

KRU held a press conference for their upcoming concert on 16 December at the Dadi Cinema in Pavilion Kuala Lumpur and revealed that the theme of this concert will be the 1990s fashion era. GenKRU is KRU's first live performance in seven years since their final concert, Gergasi 25 KRU, which was held at Istana Budaya, Kuala Lumpur from 4 to 6 May 2018 in which the KRU brothers decided to retired from their music career after exactly more than 25 years. According to Norman, the concert was intended to reunited them and their fans irrespective of generations. They also welcomed any other artists to perform on stage at the concert. He also revealed that there are five organizers and promoters who expressed their interest to organise the GenKRU concert. However, most of them doesn't meet the standards desired by the brothers, and there are some even doesn't know or ever heard their songs. They finally chose Icon Entertainment as the organizer for GenKRU concert as they believed its credibility, while disclosed that its founder, Iman Tang has a "creative background and seriousness" in music business. Norman said: "Of course, we want to protect our name and legacy, so Iman is the best choice to organise our concert". Prior to the KRU concert, Icon Entertainment has organised concerts for many Malaysian artists including M. Nasir and Siti Nordiana as well as Indonesian artists like Melly Goeslaw and Ungu.

When explaining the song selection, which they rarely performed in their previous concerts, Yusry asserted: "Of course, and we have done it before in our final concert and response from fans was also very positive. We need to select songs carefully. But, of course we have some songs that need to be performed in a new ways and there are some songs that should played". Edry said on their preparation in their upcoming concert: "Dance is synonymous with us and the fans who come will definitely want to see the dance visuals, not just a clip. We also still remember some of the old dance steps and are ready to do new choreography as well". For their upcoming concert, they also have a long discussion on the state-of-the-art technology and staging systems whch have never used in their previous concerts. In February, the brothers made a preparatory training and began focused on training together after Hari Raya Aidilfitri, and also made a private training individually for the first two months and trained together in the third month. KRU announced that the concert was scheduled to held from 3 to 11 May 2025 for two weeks and four nights. Initially, it was originally to held for two days, 3 and 4 May, however, KRU and Icon Entertainment decided to extended two more days for the concert, namely 10 and 11 May. The set list featured songs that were curated by the KRU brothers from their music catalogue as well as songs performed by other artists.

On 10 April 2025, the group also announced to continued the GenKRU concert in Singapore with the last leg held on 28 June at The Star Performing Arts Centre, entitled as GenKRU Live in Singapore. It is their first live performances in Singapore since 2016. For their concert in Singapore, Yusry revealed that their performance would be more intimate and closer as its location capacity was very smaller than the Axiata Arena.

== Concert synopsis ==
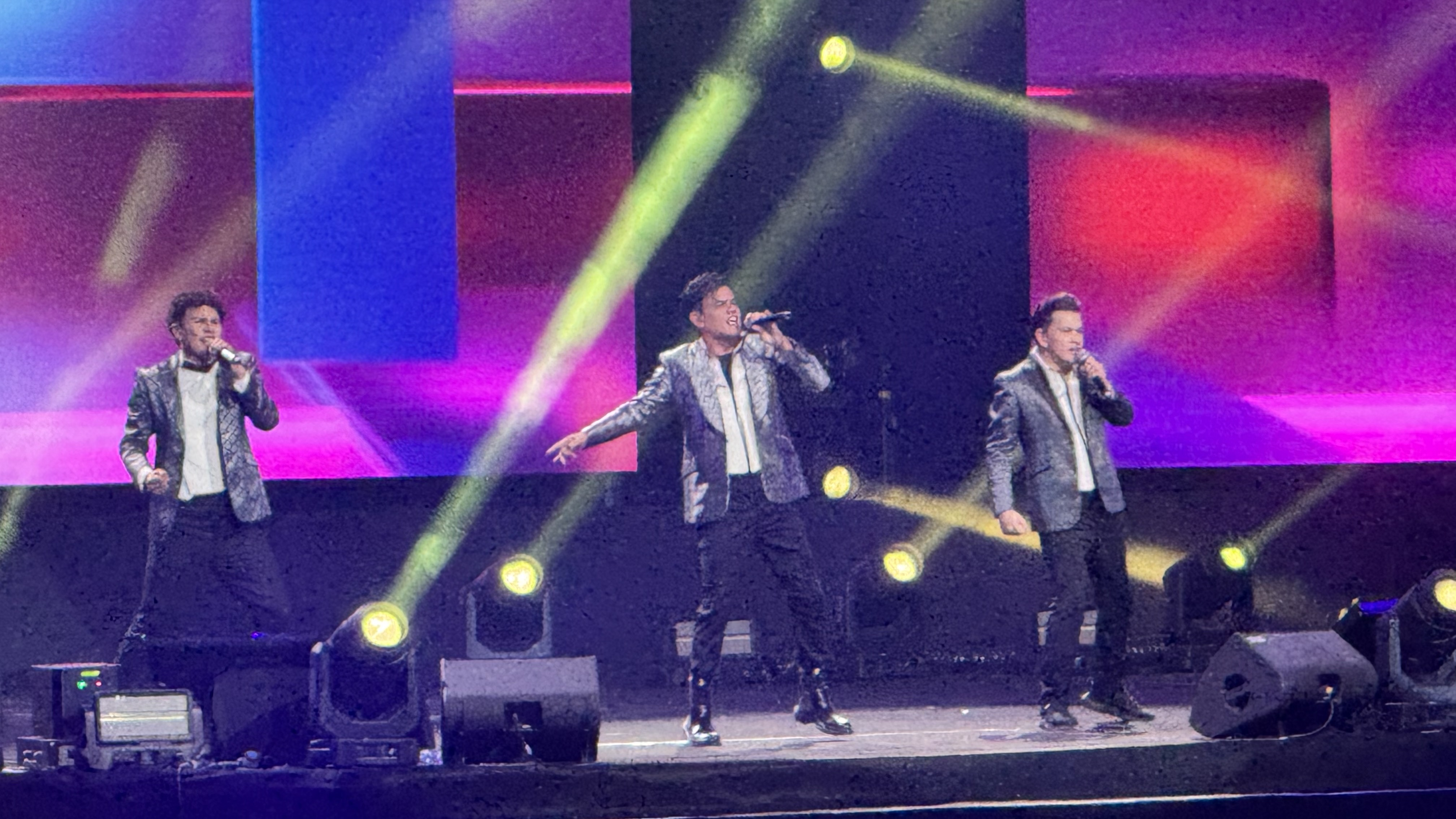
KRU performed at the fourth and last day of the GenKRU concert.

On the first day, the concert opened with the song, "Fanatik" from their 1997 compilation album, KRUmania. The KRU brothers continued the opening by invited their first-ever signed girl group, Elite, to perform "Di Pintu Syurga" with them, followed by Sabah-born singer, Adam Mat Saman to perform "Terhangat di Pasaran" together. Soon after, they performed their famous numbers like "Hanya Kau", "Inikah Ertinya Cinta" and "Apa Saja". Malaysian rap group Nico and AC Mizal made a cameo appearance on stage. A montage shows AC made an announcement that Yusry become a rapper. (Note: This, according to Norman and Edry, throughout their career, Yusry have never contributed raps in any of their songs.) A tribute segment features the KRU brothers performed "Perpisahan Terasing" featuring the voice of Sudirman Arshad. They then continued their performances with their popular numbers like "Awas!", "The Way We Jam" and "Babe" as well as their compositions for other artists. KRU continued their performance on the second and third day with some of their songs like "Janji Tinggal Janji", followed by "Mengerti", "Ooh! La! La!", "2" dan "Di Dalam Dilema". At the fourth and last day of the GenKRU concert, KRU was joined by Feminin and performing "Untukmu". They then joined by 4U2C and comedian Abon.

== Critical reception ==
The concert was met with positive responses from critics and concert reviewers, who praised KRU's showmanship and vocal abilities. Budiey from Sensasi Selebriti described the concert was "not just a flashback – but a statement". He further added, "To be honest, that night wasn't just entertainment — but a celebration of our country's musical heritage that will never fade". Shah Shamshiri of Travellah wrote that the concert "wasn’t just a walk down memory lane — it was a bold reminder of how timeless and innovative the group has always been. After decades in the industry, KRU continues to command the stage with charisma, conviction, and class". Writing for The Malaysian Reserve, Akmar Annuar deemed that the GenKRU "was never just a concert — it was a cultural reckoning, a generational checkpoint and for many Malaysians, a deeply personal rewind into adolescence". She further remarked: "Their vocals were unwavering, harmonies tight and their physical energy on stage was nothing short of impressive" and concluded that, "It wasn’t just a win for KRU — it showed that local music can still draw crowds and fill stadiums, even after all these years".

== Commercial performance ==
Ticket sales for the first day of the concert was opened on 20 December and have been sold out in less than an hour, while for the concert's second day, its ticket sales was opened on 23 December and sold out in 45 minutes. The concert's ticket pre-sales was opened on 7 January 2025 for Maybank card users while the ticket sales was opened on 8 January, whereas the ticket sales for the fourth day of GenKRU was opened on 8 May.

The concert is a commercial success where 8,000 of its tickets were successfully sold out within an hour. The warm reception earned KRU two recognitions from the Malaysia Book of Records, namely the "Most Performances in a Concert Series" and the "Fastest Concert Ticket Sales in 1 Hour".

== Set list ==
The set list is adapted from the first night of the concert. The list evolved over the course of the concert, and sometimes included other numbers.

1. "Fanatik"
2. "Malam Kita"
3. "Ooh! La! La!"
4. "Babe"
5. "The Way We Jam"
6. "Untukmu"
7. "Terhangat di Pasaran" (feat. Adam Mat Saman)
8. "Balada Hati"
9. "Di Dalam Dilema"
10. "Perpisahan Terasing"
11. "Voodoo"
12. Medley: "Bidadari" / "Hingga Ke Jannah"
13. "Dekat Padamu"
14. Medley: "Wanita" / "Apa Saja"
15. "Negatif"
16. "Di Pintu Syurga" (feat. Elite)
17. Medley: "Separuh Masa" / "Sedetik Lebih" / "Romancinta" / "Hi Hi Bye Bye"
18. "2"
19. "Hanya Kau" / "Inikah Ertinya Cinta"
20. "Semuanya OK" / "Mengerti"
21. "One More Time"
22. "Janji Tinggal Janji"
23. "Jangan Lafazkan"
24. "Awas!"

== Shows ==
List of concerts, showing date, city and venue
Date	City	Venue
May 3, 2025	Bukit Jalil, Kuala Lumpur	Axiata Arena
May 4, 2025	Bukit Jalil, Kuala Lumpur	Axiata Arena
May 10, 2025	Bukit Jalil, Kuala Lumpur	Axiata Arena
May 11, 2025	Bukit Jalil, Kuala Lumpur	Axiata Arena
June 26, 2025	Singapore	The Star Performing Arts Centre

== Personnel ==
- KRU – performer
- Elite – guest performer
- Adam Mat Saman – guest performer
- Nico – guest performer
- AC Mizal – guest performer
- Feminin – guest performer
- Iman Tang – concert promoter
- Icon Entertainment – concert organiser
- Astro Radio – official radio sponsor
- thenews.com.my – official media partner
- Astro Gempak – official digital media
- Kesion – official indoor media
- Warisan Ad Outdoor – official outdoor media
- Ticket2U – official ticketing
- Celebfest – promotional partner (Singapore)
- Sound Innovations – technical partner (Singapore)
- Sistic – official ticketing (Singapore)
- The Star Performing Arts Centre – venue partner (Singapore)
- Konsortium E-Mutiara – official transportation (Singapore)
