= Awas! (film) =

- Video tape cover
- Directed by: Abdul Aziz Razak
- Written by: Abdul Wahid Nasir; Abdul Aziz Razak
- Produced by: Anita Rafar
- Starring: KRU; Linda Rafar; Leina Hangat; Jalaluddin Hassan
- Cinematography: Jamal Maarif
- Edited by: Raja Din; Abdul Aziz Razak
- Music by: KRU
- Production company: Medanmas
- Release date: 7 September 1995 (Malaysia)
- Running time: 129 minutes
- Country: Malaysia
- Language: Malay

Awas! (Danger!; stylised in all caps) is a 1995 Malaysian film directed by Abdul Aziz Razak. The film is an acting debut of Malaysian boy band, KRU, which also contributed its soundtrack album.

== Plot ==
The film revolves about the three boys who find themselves pursued by the gangsters after they find a diskette which contains a valuable information.

== Cast ==
- KRU:
  - Norman Abdul Halim as himself
  - Yusry Abdul Halim as himself
  - Edry Abdul Halim as himself
- Mia Eldabo as Emilia
- Linda Rafar as Ika
- Leina Hangat as Sheila
- Edika Yusof as Roy
- Jalaluddin Hassan as Prof. Rahman
- Aznah Hamid as Edry's mother
- Mahmud Ali Bashah as Sham
- Rozie Othman as Norman's mother
- Kartina Aziz as Emilia's mother
- Jean Jacques Gicquel as Edward
- Johnny Carl Murray as Oliver
- Rawi Mohd. Said as Sheila's father
- Sazali Khan as Husni

== Production ==
The film was directed by Abdul Aziz Razak, who also served as the screenwriter and editor, and produced by Medanmas. Principal photography began in November 1994 in Penang, with a budget costed RM800,000. Malaysian boy band, KRU were cast in leading roles, while Linda Rafar and Leina Hangat was cast as the leading woman.

Indonesian artists Nike Ardilla, Puput Novel and Nafa Natasha are initially agreed to cast in Awas!, but they decided to withdraw from the film, citing creative differences.

== Soundtrack ==
A soundtrack album, entitled Awas! da' Soundtrack was recorded and performed by KRU and was released on 15 June 1995. The soundtrack contains 11 new songs and two remixed versions of "Awas!" and "Di Dalam Dilema".

== Release and reception ==
The film was released on 7 September 1995 and fairly successful.

Hartati Hassan Basri of Harian Metro wrote that the film has "too many sub-plot and erases loving mood" between Norman and Emilia.
