= Berita Harian (Singapore) =

Newspaper in Singapore

- Type: Daily newspaper
- Format: Broadsheet
- Owner: SPH Media
- Publisher: SPH Media
- Editor: Nazry Mokhtar
- Associate editor: Hanim Mohd Saleh
- News editor: Nazri Hadi Saparin
- Founded: 1 July 1957; 69 years ago (original); 1 September 1972; 53 years ago (current)
- Language: Malay
- Headquarters: Singapore
- Circulation: 52,500 (2012)
- OCLC number: 53812840
- Website: www.beritaharian.sg

Berita Harian (Malay for "Daily News") is the sole Malay-language broadsheet newspaper published in Singapore. It is published daily from Monday to Saturday, and on Sunday as Berita Minggu (Malay: "Sunday News"). This newspaper is indirectly connected to the Malaysian paper of the same name, Berita Harian. Both papers originated from a single publication founded on 1 July 1957. They were separated in September 1972, after which the Singaporean edition became de jure non-politically aligned and concentrated on Singapore-related news, while the Malaysian edition continued to maintain an alignment with the United Malays National Organisation (UMNO).

== See also ==
- Suria
- Ria 897
- Warna 942
