= Rabbani 1418-1428H =

Rabbani 1418–1428H

Compilation album by Rabbani
- Released: December 28, 2007
- Recorded: 1997–2007
- Genres: Nasheed; Contemporary
- Length: 65:04
- Label: EMI Music Malaysia

Rabbani chronology
Maulana (2007)	Rabbani 1418–1428H (2007)	Nostalgia Nadamurni (2008)

Singles from Rabbani 1418–1428H
- 1. "Mentari Merah Di Ufuk Timur" Released: 2007; 2. "Saksi" Released: 2008

Rabbani 1418–1428H is the fourth compilation album by Malaysian nasheed group Rabbani. It was released on 28 December 2007 by EMI Music Malaysia.

== Production ==
To celebrate their tenth anniversary in the music industry, Rabbani compiled several of their popular songs into Rabbani 1418–1428H. The title refers to the Islamic Hijri years marking the group's decade-long journey.

The compilation features selected tracks from their earlier albums, including Rabbani (1997), Arah (1997), Muhammad Ya Habibi (1998), Pergi Tak Kembali (1999), Iqrar 1421 (2000), Intifada (2000), Aman (2001), and Qiblat (2002).

The album also includes two new songs, including "Saksi", a duet with Mawi, written by Cham of the Malaysian R&B group V.E. and a new version of "Mentari Merah Di Ufuk Timur", originally performed by Search, was recorded featuring its lead singer Amy Search. The album also incorporates short hadith recitations by Wan Roslili Wan Daud of Radio IKIM.

== Track listing ==
No.	Title	Writer(s)	Original album	Length
1.	"Mentari Merah Di Ufuk Timur" (feat. Amy Search)	M. Nasir	N/A	05:18
2.	"Saksi" (feat. Mawi)	Cham V.E	N/A	04:30
3.	"Surah Yasin (ayat 65)"		N/A
4.	"Satu Qiblat Yang Sama"	Edry Abdul Halim	Qiblat	04:11
5.	"Intifada"	Norman Abdul Halim; Yusry Abdul Halim; Edry Abdul Halim; Sohibul Fadil	Intifada	03:36
6.	"Anak Soleh"	Asri Ibrahim; Nazim Mohamed	Arah	05:04
7.	"Hadith Riwayat Al Tirmizi"		N/A
8.	"7 Hari"	Mohd. Zaid Yusoff	Intifada	04:24
9.	"Nawaitu"	Bong; Azam Dungun; Hamdan Md. Noor	Intifada	04:23
10.	"Handzallah"	Yusri Yusof; Sohibul Fadil	Qiblat	04:50
11.	"Berkorban Apa Saja"	P. Ramlee; Jamil Sulong	Rabbani	03:19
12.	"Pergi Tak Kembali"	Norman Abdul Halim; Yusry Abdul Halim; Edry Abdul Halim; Sohibul Fadil	Pergi Tak Kembali	04:00
13.	"Hadith Riwayat Bukhari & Muslim"		N/A
14.	"Iqrar"	LY; Muhammad Ifwat	Iqrar 1421	04:28
15.	"Muhammad Ya Habibi"	Copyright Control	Muhammad Ya Habibi	04:28
16.	"Kerlipan Cinta"	LY; Muhammad Ifwat	Aman	04:30
17.	"Surah Al-A'raf (ayat 54)"		N/A
18.	"Assalamualaikum"	Hj Akhmudi	Iqrar 1421	04:27
19.	"Insan"	Nathan; Abdul Jalil Salleh; Sohibul Fadil	Pergi Tak Kembali	03:56
20.	"Hadith Riwayat Al Tabarani"		N/A
Total length:				65:04

== Release and reception ==
Rabbani 1418–1428H was released in Malaysia on 28 December 2007 by EMI Music Malaysia. On 5 March 2008, an MTV Karaoke VCD was released, featuring music videos from the album.

== Personnel ==
Credits adapted from the album liner notes.

- Rabbani – vocals
- Asri Ibrahim – lead vocals, songwriter
- Amy Search – vocals
- Mawi – vocals
- M. Nasir – songwriter
- Cham – songwriter
- Edry Abdul Halim – songwriter
- Norman Abdul Halim – songwriter
- Yusry Abdul Halim – songwriter
- Sohibul Fadil – songwriter
- Nazim Mohamed – songwriter
- Mohd. Zaid Yusoff – songwriter
- Bong – songwriter
- Azam Dungun – songwriter
- Hamdan Md. Noor – songwriter
- Yusri Yusof – songwriter
- P. Ramlee – songwriter
- Jamil Sulong – songwriter
- LY – songwriter
- Muhammad Ifwat – songwriter
- Hj Akhmudi – songwriter
- Nathan – songwriter
- Abdul Jalil Salleh – songwriter
- Wan Roslili Wan Daud – hadith narration
- Jenny Chin – arrangement

== Release history ==
Region	Release date	Format	Label
Malaysia	28 December 2007	CD, digital download	EMI Music Malaysia
