= Aman =

Aman may refer to:

== People ==
=== First names ===
- Aman Gupta (born 1982), Indian entrepreneur
- Aman Hambleton (born 1992), Canadian chess grandmaster
- Aman Hayer (born 1979), Bhangra musician
- Aman Verma (actor) (born 1971), Indian actor

=== Surnames ===
- Aman (surname)
  - Cao Aman (died 220), Chinese statesman, warlord, and poet
  - Hersi Aman (1824–1879), 3rd Sultan of the Habr Yunis Sultanate
  - Theodor Aman (1831–1891), Romanian painter
  - Edmond Aman-Jean (1858–1936), French symbolist painter
  - Charles Aman (1887–1936), American rower
  - Mohammad Aman (born 1929), Afghan banker
  - Asiah Aman (1931–2024), Singaporean singer and actress
  - Reinhold Aman (1936–2019), German chemical engineer and publisher
  - Bill Aman (born 1946), American politician
  - Musa Aman (born 1951), Malaysian politician
  - Zeenat Aman (born 1951), Indian actress and model
  - Anifah Aman (born 1953), Malaysian politician
  - Junaidah Aman (born 1955), Malaysian sprinter
  - Ehsan Aman (born 1959), Afghan-American singer
  - Amanullah Aman (born 1962), Bangladeshi politician
  - Rami Aman (born 1981/1982), Palestinian journalist
  - Nauman Aman (born 1983), Pakistani cricketer
  - Ashutosh Aman (born 1986), Indian cricketer
  - Mohammed Aman (born 1988), Saudi Arabian footballer
  - Mohammed Aman (born 1994), Ethiopian middle-distance runner
  - Nils Åman (born 2000), Swedish ice hockey player
  - Muhammad Ali Aman, Singaporean politician

=== Nicknames ===
- Cao Cao (155–220), Chinese warlord of the Three Kingdoms nicknamed "Aman"

== Entertainment ==
- Aman (film), 1967 Bollywood film, by Mohan Kumar, starring Rajendra Kumar and Saira Banu
- A.M.A.N. (TV series), a Greek television comedy series aired by ANT1
- Aman (Tolkien), a fictitious location in J. R. R. Tolkien's legendarium, also known as the Undying Lands
- Aman Hyderabadi, a fictional character in the 1960 Indian film Barsaat Ki Raat, portrayed by Bharat Bhushan
- Aman (Myriam Fares album), 2015
- Aman (Rabbani album), 2001
- "Aman" (song), a 2020 single by Albanian singer Dafina Zeqiri featuring Albanian rappers Ledri Vula and Lumi B

== Other ==
- AMAN (naval exercise), a multilateral naval exercise
- Aman (Islam) or amān, assurance of security or clemency granted to enemies in Islamic law
- Aman Futures Group, a Malaysian multi-level marketing company
- Aman Resorts, a luxury hotel group
- Aman rice, an ecotype of rice
- Academia Militar das Agulhas Negras (A.M.A.N.), the Brazilian Army military academy
- Acute motor axonal neuropathy
- Aliansi Masyarakat Adat Nusantara (AMAN), an Indonesian NGO defending customary communities' rights
- Arrival Manager; see Air traffic control
- Military Intelligence Directorate (Israel) (Hebrew: Agaf HaModi'in or Aman)

== See also ==
- Amanda (given name)
- Amann
- Amman (disambiguation)
- Ammann (disambiguation)
- Ammon (disambiguation)
- Amon (disambiguation)
- Amun (disambiguation)
- Bukit Aman
