= Aman (surname) =

Aman is a surname. Notable people with the surname include:

- Hersi Aman (1824–1879), 3rd Sultan of the Habr Yunis Sultanate
- Theodor Aman (1831–1891), Romanian painter
- Edmond Aman-Jean (1858–1936), French symbolist painter
- Charles Aman (1887–1936), American rower
- Mohammad Aman (born 1929), Afghan banker
- Asiah Aman (1931–2024), Singaporean singer and actress
- Reinhold Aman (1936–2019), German chemical engineer and publisher
- Bill Aman (born 1946), American politician
- Musa Aman (born 1951), Malaysian politician
- Zeenat Aman (born 1951), Indian actress and model
- Anifah Aman (born 1953), Malaysian politician
- Junaidah Aman (born 1955), Malaysian sprinter
- Ehsan Aman (born 1959), Afghan-American singer
- Amanullah Aman (born 1962), Bangladeshi politician
- Rami Aman (born 1981/1982), Palestinian journalist
- Nauman Aman (born 1983), Pakistani cricketer
- Ashutosh Aman (born 1986), Indian cricketer
- Mohammed Aman (born 1988), Saudi Arabian footballer
- Mohammed Aman (born 1994), Ethiopian middle-distance runner
- Nils Åman (born 2000), Swedish ice hockey player
- Muhammad Ali Aman, Singaporean politician
