= Insult =

Expression, statement which is disrespectful or scornful

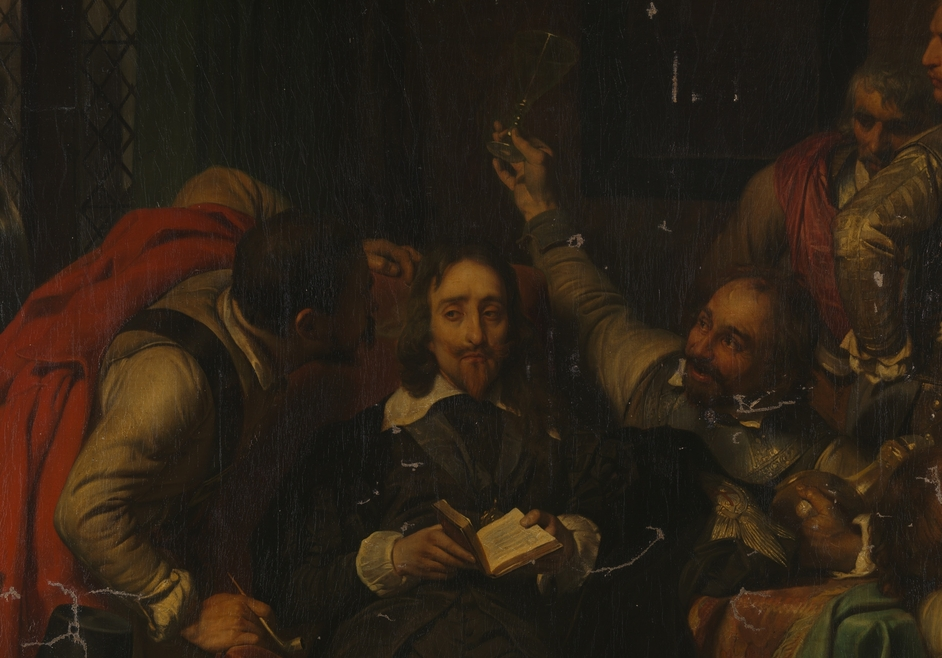
A portion of Hippolyte Delaroche's 1836 oil painting Charles I Insulted by Cromwell's Soldiers

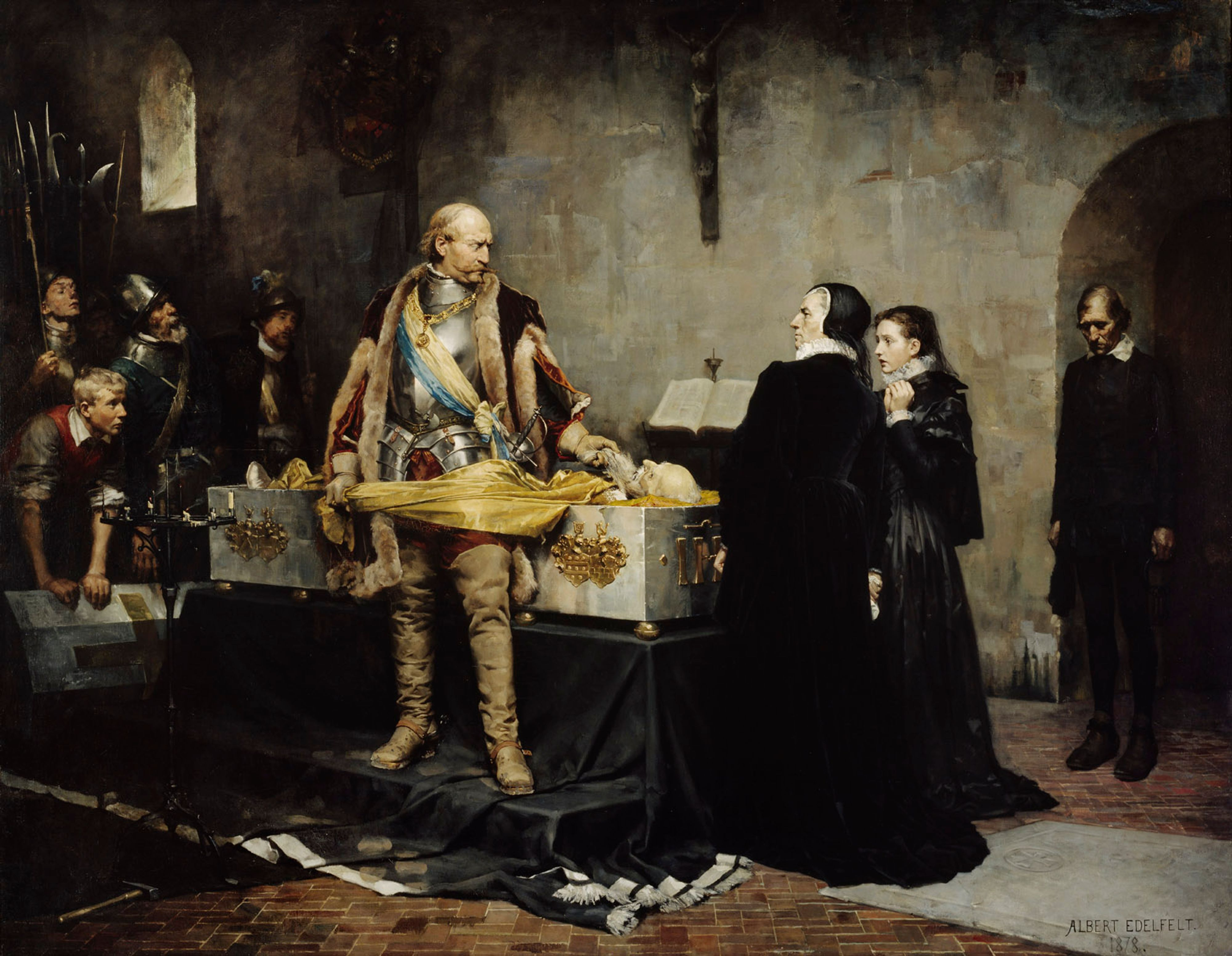
Duke Karl Insulting the Corpse of Klaus Fleming, Albert Edelfelt, 1878. Fleming's wife Ebba Stenbock on the right.

An insult is an expression, statement, or behavior that is often deliberately disrespectful, offensive, scornful, or derogatory towards an individual or a group. Insults can be intentional or unintentional, and they often aim to belittle, offend, or humiliate the target. While insults may sometimes include factual information, such information is typically presented in a pejorative manner, intended to provoke a negative emotional response or to socially undermine or discredit the target. Insults can also be made unintentionally or in a playful way, but these can, in some cases, also have unintended negative impacts and effects.

Insults can have varying impacts, effects, and meanings depending on intent, use, recipient's understanding of the meaning, intent behind the action or words, and social setting and social norms, including cultural references and meanings.

== History ==
In ancient Rome, political speeches and debates were known to include strong harshness and personal attacks. Historians suggest that insults and verbal attacks were common in the political discourse of the time. This practice reflected the highly confrontational nature of political engagement in ancient Rome.

Many religious texts and beliefs have also contributed to views on insults and the implications of making insults in anger. Buddhism teaches 'Right Speech' is a part of the Noble Eightfold Path.

In Christianity, for example, the Sermon on the Mount delivered by Jesus includes teachings on the significance of anger. Jesus emphasized the importance of managing one's emotions and non judgment in this example.

In addition to political contexts, history also reveals unusual instances of insults. The Cadaver Synod, was an event where Pope Stephen VI held a posthumous trial for Pope Formosus in 897 AD. Stephen became the Pope after Pope Formosus and had his body dug up, dressed, and placed on a throne to stand trial even after his death.

== Unintentional insults ==
An example of an unintentional insult may be not tasting a dessert made by a host. Careless social actions can also become unintentional insults; for example, comments about facial features, personality traits, personal taste (e.g., in music), underestimating personal abilities or interests, use or acknowledgement of stereotypes, jokes, or even walking away from someone are among some things that may be misinterpreted as intentional and accidentally cause offence.

== Jocular exchange ==
Jacques Lacan considered insults a primary form of social interaction, central to the imaginary order – "a situation that is symbolized in the 'Yah-boo, so are you' of the transitivist quarrel, the original form of aggressive communication".

Erving Goffman points out that every "crack or remark set up the possibility of a counter-riposte, topper, or squelch, that is, a comeback". He cites the example of possible interchanges at a dance in a school gym:

- A one-liner: Boy: "Care to dance?" Girl: "No, I came here to play basketball" Boy: (crumbles)
- A comeback: Boy: "Care to dance?" Girl: "No, I came here to play basketball" Boy: "Sorry, I should have guessed by the way you're dressed".

== Backhanded compliments ==
A backhanded (or left-handed) compliment, or asteism, is an insult that is disguised as, or accompanied by, a compliment, especially in situations where the belittling or condescension is intentional.

Examples of backhanded compliments include, but are not limited to:

- "I did not expect you to ace that exam. Good for you.", which could impugn the target's success as a fluke.
- "That skirt makes you look far thinner.", insinuating hidden fat.
- "I wish I could be as straightforward as you, but I always try to get along with everyone.", insinuating an overbearing attitude.
- "I like you. You have the boldness of a much younger person.", insinuating decline with age.

Negging is a type of backhanded compliment used for emotional manipulation or as a seduction method. The term was coined and prescribed by pickup artists. Negging is often viewed as a straightforward insult rather than as a pick-up line, in spite of the fact that proponents of the technique traditionally stress it is not an insult.

== Personal attacks ==
A personal attack is an insult which is directed at some attribute of the person.

The Federal Communications Commission's personal attack rule defined a personal attack as one made upon honesty, character, integrity, or like personal qualities in the Communications Act of 1934.

Personal attacks are generally considered a fallacy when used in arguments since they do not attempt to debunk the opposing sides argument, rather attacking the qualities of a person.

== Sexuality ==
Verbal insults often take a phallic or pudendal form. This includes profanity, and may also include insults to one's sexuality. There are also insults pertaining to the extent of one's sexual activity. For example, according to James Bloodworth, incel “has gradually crept into the vocabulary of every internet troll, sometimes being used against men who blame and harass women for not wanting to sleep with them.”

== Entertainment ==
Insults in poetic form is practiced throughout history, more often as entertainment rather than maliciousness. Flyting is a contest consisting of the exchange of insults between two parties, often conducted in verse and became public entertainment in Scotland in the 15th and 16th centuries. Senna is a form of Old Norse Eddic poetry consisting of an exchange of insults between participants.

O du eselhafter Peierl (Oh, you asinine Peierl), composed by Wolfgang Amadeus Mozart, was meant for fun, mocking, scatological humor directed at a friend of Mozart's.

More modern versions include poetry slam, dozens, roasts, diss tracks and battle rap. In the 1980s Masters of the Universe franchise, the character Skeletor became known for insulting those around him with comedic putdowns. There is also a comedy genre of insult comedy.

== Anatomies ==
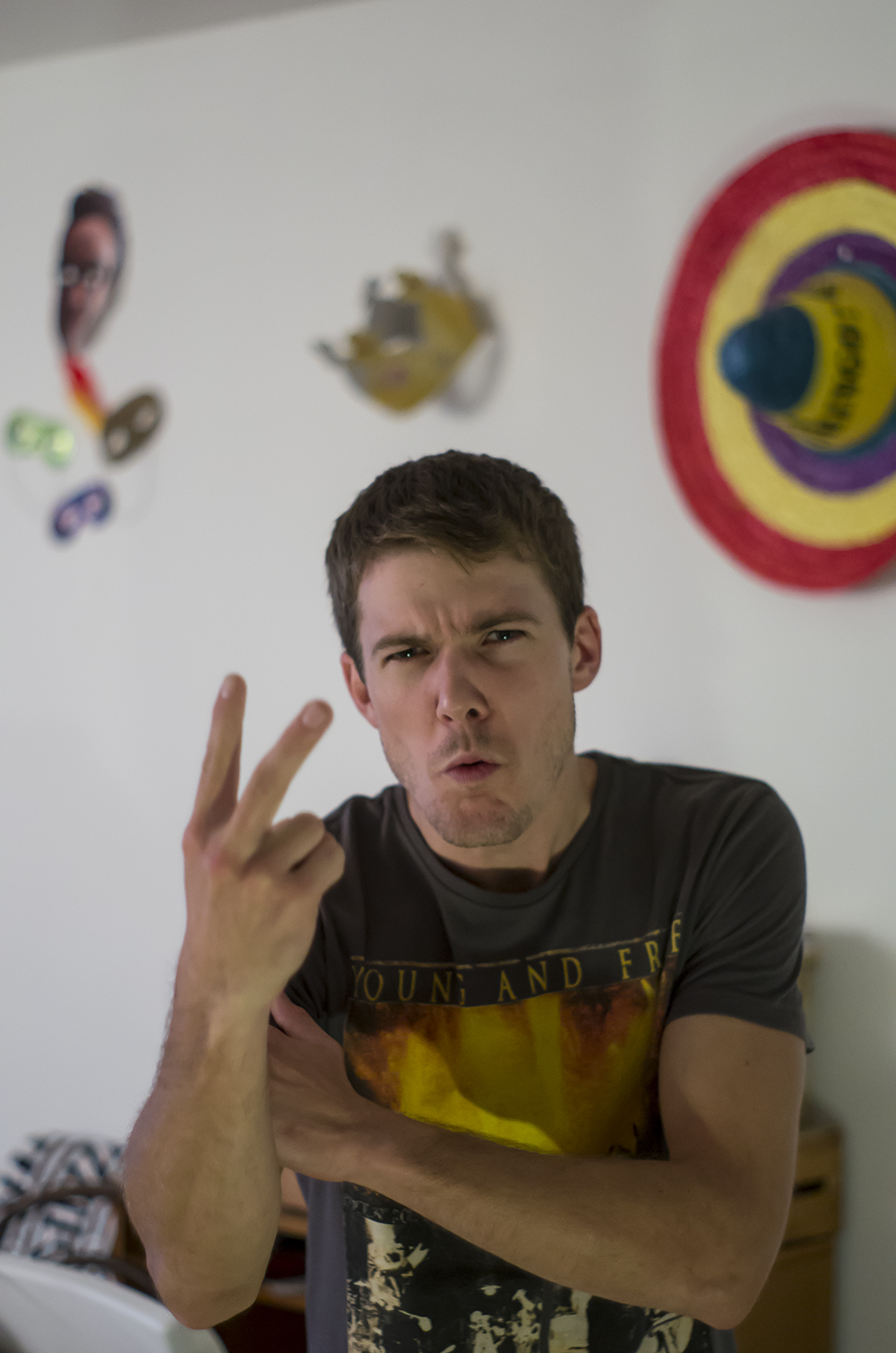
The use of the V sign as an insult, combined with the upwards swing movement

Various typologies of insults have been proposed over the years. Ethologist Desmond Morris, noting that "almost any action can operate as an Insult Signal if it is performed out of its appropriate context – at the wrong time or in the wrong place", classes such signals in ten "basic categories":

1. Uninterest signals
2. Boredom signals
3. Impatience signals
4. Superiority signals
5. Deformed-compliment signals
6. Mock-discomfort signals
7. Rejection signals
8. Mockery signals
9. Symbolic insults
10. Dirt signals

Elizabethans took great interest in such analyses, distinguishing, for example, the "fleering frump ... when we give a mock with a scornful countenance as in some smiling sort looking aside or by drawing the lip awry, or shrinking up the nose". Shakespeare humorously set up an insult-hierarchy of seven-fold "degrees. The first, the Retort Courteous; the second, the Quip Modest; the third, the Reply Churlish; the fourth, the Reproof Valiant; the fifth, the Countercheck Quarrelsome; the sixth, the Lie with Circumstance; the seventh, the Lie Direct".

== Perceptions ==
What qualifies as an insult is also determined both by the individual social situation and by changing social mores. Thus, on one hand the insulting "obscene invitations of a man to a strange girl can be the spicy endearments of a husband to his wife".

== See also ==
The dictionary definition of Jibe at Wiktionary

- Ad hominem – Attacking the person rather than their argument
- Bless your heart – Common phrase in the Southern United States
- Cyber defamation law – South Korean legislation
- Damning with faint praise – English idiom
- Defamation – Communication causing harm to reputation
- Emotional blackmail – Negative form of psychological control over another
- Flag desecration – Deliberately damaging or mistreating a flag
- Harassment – Wide range of behaviours of an offensive nature
- Lèse-majesté – Offence against the dignity of a reigning head of state
- List of ethnic slurs
- List of shoe-throwing incidents
- Wowbagger, the Infinitely Prolonged
- Maledicta
- Maledictology – Research into cursing and swearing
- Maternal insult – Insulting reference to someone's mother
- Microaggression – Unintentional contempt or disrespect toward marginalized groups
- Mockery – Act of insulting or making light of a person or other thing
- Mooning – Display of the buttocks
- Name calling – Directing insulting or demeaning labels
- Negging – Compliment to undermine the receiver's confidence
- One-upmanship – Rivalry for a goal which cannot be shared
- Online shaming – Form of public shaming
- Pejorative – Derogatory or discriminating term
- Profanity – Socially offensive form of language
- List of religious slurs
- Rudeness – Display of disrespect
- Sarcasm – Sharp, bitter remark
- Taunting – Battle cry, sarcastic remark, gesture, or insult
- The Dozens – Two-player insults battle of African American origin
- Yo mama joke – Insulting reference to someone's mother
