= Yang Benar =

Studio album by Rabbani
- Released: August 8, 2016
- Recorded: 2012; 2016
- Genres: Nasheed; Contemporary
- Length: 35:33
- Labels: Rabbani Production; Inteam Records
- Producers: Rabbani; Yusri Yusof; Edry Abdul Halim; Sohibul Fadhil

Rabbani chronology
Koleksi Emas Rabbani (2015)	Yang Benar (2016)

Singles from Yang Benar
- 1. "Yang Benar" Released: 2016

Yang Benar (The Truth) is the thirteenth studio album by Malaysian nasheed group Rabbani. It was released on 8 August 2016 by Rabbani Production and Inteam Records.

== Background ==
After seven years without releasing a new studio album, Rabbani returned in 2016 with Yang Benar. For this album, Azadan Abdul Aziz served as the lead vocalist, replacing Zulkiflee Azman, who previously held the role on Mahabbah (2009).

The group approached Edry Abdul Halim of KRU as a songwriter, marking their first collaboration since Epik (2003). Edry composed the self-titled track “Yang Benar”. Other songwriters for the album include Yusri Yusof, Syeikh Qalam, Sohibul Fadil, and Daqmie. All songs on the album are new, except for “Mawar Berdarah”, which was previously included in the album Koleksi Emas Rabbani (2015).

The album features Malaysian singer Siti Nurhaliza on “Muhammad Al Ameen”, which was recorded in 2012 for the Maulid celebration. Malaysian singer Black feature on the track “Dalam Aku”.

Rabbani collaborated with Lembaga Zakat Selangor on the track “Zakat di Hati” to raise public awareness about zakat. This album was the final release to include contributions from Ustaz Sohibul Fadil Sabikin, a key figure in the formation of Rabbani and Nadamurni, who passed away in September 2014.

== Track listing ==
No.	Title	Writer(s)	Length
1.	"Yang Benar"	Edry Abdul Halim; Rabbani	3:52
2.	"Dalam Aku" (feat. Black)	Syeikh Qalam	4:20
3.	"Syukur"	Yusri Yusof; Mohd Asri Ubaidullah	4:21
4.	"Permaidani Buatku"	Yusri Yusof	4:31
5.	"Mawar Berdarah"	Sohibul Fadil Sabikin	4:06
6.	"Muhammad Al Ameen" (feat. Siti Nurhaliza)	Sohibul Fadil Sabikin	5:24
7.	"Zakat Di Hati"	Daqmie; Sohibul Fadil; Asri Ubaidullah	4:04
8.	"Medley Selawat"	Copyright Control	4:35
Total length:			35:33

== Release and reception ==
Yang Benar was released on 8 August 2016, with “Yang Benar” as the lead single. The album was released by Rabbani Production and Inteam Records.

== Personnel ==
Credits adapted from the album liner notes.

- Rabbani – vocals, producer
- Sohibul Fadil Hj. Sabikin – songwriter
- Edry Abdul Halim – arranger, producer, songwriter
- Yusri Yusof – producer, songwriter
- Daqmie – songwriter
- Syeikh Qalam – songwriter
- Asri Ubaidullah – songwriter
- Rumie Booty – arranger, mixing, recording
- Raja Farhan – recording
- Shamir Supaat – recording, mastering
- Fauzi Marzuki – mixing, mastering
- Bard Muffin – mixing, mastering
- Alfa – mixing, mastering

== Release history ==
Region	Release date	Format	Label
Malaysia	8 August 2016	CD, digital download	Rabbani Production; Inteam Records
