= Amtmann (surname) =

Amtmann is a German surname derived from the historical profession and official title Amtmann in German-speaking countries. Notable people with the surname include:

- Anna Amtmann, German scientist
- Bernard Amtmann (1907–1979), Austrian-Canadian antiquarian bookseller, bibliographer, and publisher
- Carla Amtmann (born 1987), Chilean politician of German-Italian descent
- Hans Amtmann (1906–2007), German aircraft designer

== See also ==
- Ammann, a predominantly Swiss variant of the name
