= Amman (disambiguation) =

Amman is the capital and largest city in Jordan.

Amman may also refer to:

- Amman (Spokane, Washington), a building listed on the U.S. National Register of Historic Places
- Amman (surname)
- Amman (TV series), a 2020 Indian Tamil-language television series
- River Amman, a river of south Wales
- Ammann, a medieval Swiss official
- Mariamman, the South Indian Hindu goddess of disease and rain

== See also ==
- Aman (disambiguation)
- Amma (disambiguation)
- Amann, a surname
- Ammann (disambiguation)
- Amtmann, historical profession
- Oman (disambiguation)
