= Yalla Beena =

Compilation album by Rabbani
- Released: July 6, 2004
- Recorded: 2004
- Genres: Nasheed; Contemporary
- Length: 73:15
- Label: KRU Music Group
- Producers: Yasin Sulaiman; Amaludin Syukri Nasution; Edry Abdul Halim; Raizan Zainal Abidin; Sohibul Fadil Hj. Sabikin

Rabbani chronology
Kenangan Lalu (2003)	Yalla Beena (2004)	Suara Takbir (2005)

Singles from Yalla Beena!
- 1. "Yalla Beena" Released: 2004

Yalla Beena (Let's Go!) is the third compilation album by Malaysian nasheed group Rabbani. It was released on 6 July 2004 by KRU Music Group.

== Background ==
Yalla Beena is the third compilation album by Rabbani. It includes seven tracks from Qiblat (2002) and six tracks from Epik (2003). The album introduces three new songs: "Yalla Beena" featuring Yasin Sulaiman, which was written and produced by him; "Fikirkanlah," written by Ameng (Spring); and "Berkelana." Additionally, Rabbani recorded a new version of their previous hit, "Assalamualaikum," and included a rendition of the Brothers song "Teman Sejati."

== Track listing ==
No.	Title	Writer(s)	Original album	Length
1.	"Yalla Beena" (feat. Yasin Sulaiman)	Yasin Sulaiman	N/A	3:35
2.	"Assalamualaikum"	Hj. Akhmudi	Rabbani	4:11
3.	"Satu Qiblat Yang Sama"	Edry Abdul Halim	Qiblat	4:15
4.	"Berkelana"	Fatimah Khair	N/A	3:56
5.	"Handzalah"	Yusri Yusof; Sokhibul Fadil	Qiblat	4:51
6.	"Subuh Yang Terakhir"	Edry Abdul Halim	Epik	3:11
7.	"Pengantin Baru"	Safwan Abd Rahman; Mohamad Asri Ubaidullah	Qiblat	3:56
8.	"Epik"	Edry Abdul Halim	Epik	3:55
9.	"Impian Hamba"	Sohibul Fadil	Qiblat	4:55
10.	"Iltizam"	Sohibul Fadil	Epik	3:47
11.	"Fikirkanlah"	Ameng (Spring)	N/A	3:52
12.	"Musafir Kelana"	Hasnol Hadi	Qiblat	4:06
13.	"Kemenangan"	Sohibul Fadil	Epik	4:14
14.	"Setanggi Kasih"	Edry Abdul Halim; Pahrol Md. Juoi	Qiblat	4:24
15.	"Maafkanlah"	Raizan Zainal Abidin	Epik	4:01
16.	"Pahlawan Agama"	Asri Ibrahim	Qiblat	5:00
17.	"Bencilah Benci"	Amaludin Syukri Nasution; Mohamad Asri Ubaidullah	Epik	3:48
18.	"Teman Sejati"	Yasin Sulaiman; Zahidin	N/A	3:18
Total length:				73:15

== Release and reception ==
Yalla Beena was released on 6 July 2004, with "Yalla Beena" as its first single. The album was distributed by Warner Music Malaysia.

Suzan Ahmad of Berita Harian, praised its blend of conventional nasyid elements with moderate contemporary influences. She described the album as "well worth the time spent listening".

Writing for The Malay Mail, Meor Shariman noted that the album featured a mix of Rabbani's earlier hits and several new songs, including the energetic collaboration with Yasin on the title track. He described the compilation as "definitely worth checking out".

== Accolades ==
Award(s)	Year	Recipient(s)	Nominated work(s)	Category	Result	Ref
Anugerah Industri Muzik	2005	Rabbani	Yalla Beena	Best Nasyid Album	Nominated	
Anugerah Industri Muzik	2005	Rabbani	Yalla Beena	Best Group Vocal Performance In an Album	Nominated	
Anugerah Era	2005	Rabbani	Yalla Beena	Choice Nasyid Song	Nominated	
Anugerah Carta Nasyid IKIM.fm	2005	Rabbani	Yalla Beena	Second Place	Won	
Anugerah Carta Nasyid IKIM.fm	2005	Asri Ibrahim	Yalla Beena	Best Vocal	Won	

== Personnel ==
Credits adapted from the album liner notes.

- Rabbani – vocals, vocal arrangement
- Asri Ibrahim – lead vocals, songwriter
- Yasin Sulaiman – songwriter, vocals, producer
- Edry Abdul Halim – songwriter, producer, arranger, keyboards
- Amaludin Syukri Nasution – songwriter, producer, arranger, keyboards, recording engineer
- Sohibul Fadil Hj. Sabikin – songwriter, producer
- Raizan Zainal Abidin – songwriter, co-producer, engineer, recording engineer
- Mohamad Asri Ubaidullah – songwriter
- Yusri Yusof – songwriter
- Pahrol Md. Juoi – songwriter
- Hasnol Hadi – songwriter
- Ameng (Spring) – songwriter

== Release history ==
Region	Release date	Format	Label
Malaysia	6 July 2004	CD, digital download	KRU Music Group
