= Iqrar 1421 =

Compilation album by Rabbani
- Released: July 17, 2000
- Recorded: 1997–2000
- Genres: Nasheed; Contemporary
- Length: 76:48
- Labels: Permata Audio; EMI Music Malaysia
- Producer: Permata Audio

Rabbani chronology
Pergi Tak Kembali (1999)	Iqrar 1421 (2000)	Intifada (2000)

Singles from Iqrar 1421
- 1. "Iqrar 1421H" Released: 2000

Iqrar 1421 ("Confession 1421") is the debut compilation album by Malaysian nasheed group Rabbani. It was released on 17 July 2000 by Permata Audio and EMI Music Malaysia. The compilation includes several of their popular songs, as well as new material. It won three awards at the 8th Anugerah Industri Muzik.

== Production ==
To mark their fourth year in the Malaysian music industry, Rabbani selected some of their popular songs for what became Iqrar 1421. The compilation includes five tracks from Rabbani (1997), five tracks from Arah (1998), two tracks from Muhammad Ya Habibi (1998), and five tracks from Pergi Tak Kembali (1999).

The album features one new song, "Iqrar 1421H", composed by LY with lyrics by Muhammad Ifwat, which served as the lead single. Rabbani also recorded new versions of two of their previous hits, "Assalamualaikum" and "Munajat".

== Track listing ==
No.	Title	Writer(s)	Original album	Length
1.	"Iqrar 1421H"	LY; Muhammad Ifwat	N/A	4:30
2.	"Surah Al Ahzab Ayat 56"	Copyright Control	Muhammad Ya Habibi	1:41
3.	"Assalamualaikum"	Hj Akhmudi	Rabbani	4:20
4.	"Muhammad Ya Habibi"	Copyright Control	Muhammad Ya Habibi	5:26
5.	"Solla 'ala Yassin"	Copyright Control	Arah	4:26
6.	"Solla' Alaikallah"	Copyright Control	Rabbani	5:41
7.	"Kebesaran Allah"	Asri Ibrahim; Sokhibul Fadil; Abu Mahdun	Arah	4:37
8.	"Berkorban Apa Saja"	P. Ramlee; Jamil Sulong	Rabbani	3:22
9.	"Adab Dan Sopan"	Mohd Asri Ubaidullah; Nazim Mohamed	Arah	4:37
10.	"Hidayah"	Yusri Yusuf; Sokhibul Fadil	Pergi Tak Kembali	4:31
11.	"Ingat 5 Sebelum 5"	Copyright Control; Sokhibul Fadil	Pergi Tak Kembali	5:22
12.	"Bidadari"	Mohd Asri Ubaidullah; Zanatul Syuhaida	Arah	5:14
13.	"Anak Soleh"	Asri Ibrahim; Nazim Mohamed	Arah	5:15
14.	"Zikir Kifarah"	Copyright Control; Sokhibul Fadil	Pergi Tak Kembali	3:19
15.	"Sifatullah"	Mohamad Asri; Copyright Control	Rabbani	4:59
16.	"Munajat"	Aminuddin Sani; Nazim Mohamed; Mohd Nawawi Ibrahim; Mohd Asri Ibrahim	Rabbani	4:48
17.	"Pergi Tak Kembali"	Norman Abdul Halim; Yusry Abdul Halim; Edry Abdul Halim; Sokhibul Fadil	Pergi Tak Kembali	4:01
18.	"Hadis Qudsi"	Mohamad Asri	Pergi Tak Kembali	0:39
Total length:				76:48

== Release and reception ==
Iqrar 1421 was released on 17 July 2000. As part of the album's promotion, EMI Music Malaysia with Harian Metro, organised the "Iqrar 1421 Quiz with Rabbani", offering winners a trip to China.

Zainal Alam Kadir of New Straits Times described Iqrar 1421 as "Rabbani's definitive compilation", noting that it "includes the group's best songs as well as a highly spiritual new track, 'Iqrar 1421H'."

== Personnel ==
Credits adapted from the album liner notes.

- Rabbani – vocals
- Norman Abdul Halim – composer, producer
- Yusry Abdul Halim – composer, producer
- Edry Abdul Halim – composer, producer
- LY – composer, producer
- Muhammad Ifwat – lyricist
- Hj Akhmudi – composer, lyricist
- Asri Ibrahim – composer, lyricist
- Sokhibul Fadil – lyricist
- Abu Mahdun – composer, lyricist
- P. Ramlee – composer
- Jamil Sulong – lyricist
- Mohd Asri Ubaidullah – composer, lyricist
- Nazim Mohamed – composer, lyricist
- Yusri Yusuf – composer, lyricist
- Zanatul Syuhaida – lyricist

== Charts ==
Chart (2000)	Peak position
Malaysian Albums Chart	3

== Certifications ==
Region	Certification	Certified units/sales
Malaysia	Platinum	50,000

== Accolades ==
Award(s)	Year	Recipient(s)	Nominated work(s)	Category	Result	Ref(s)
Anugerah Industri Muzik	2001	Rabbani	Iqrar 1421	Album of the Year	Won	
Anugerah Industri Muzik	2001	Rabbani	Iqrar 1421	Best Nasyid Album	Won	
Anugerah Industri Muzik	2001	Rabbani	Iqrar 1421	Best Group Vocal Performance In an Album	Won	

== Release history ==
Region	Release date	Format	Label
Malaysia	17 July 2000	CD, Digital download	Permata Audio, EMI Music Malaysia
