= Suara Takbir =

Studio album by Rabbani
- Released: October 10, 2005
- Recorded: 2005
- Studio: KRU Studios
- Genres: Nasheed; Contemporary
- Length: 37:32
- Label: KRU Music Group
- Producer: Amaludin Syukri Nasution

Rabbani chronology
| Yalla Beena (2004) | Suara Takbir (2005) | Maulana (2007) |

Suara Takbir (The Sound of Takbir) is the eighth studio album by Malaysian nasheed group Rabbani. It was released on 10 October 2005 by KRU Music Group.

== Background ==
The album was recorded at KRU Studios in Kuala Lumpur and produced by Amaludin Syukri Nasution. It features a collection of newly recorded songs themed around Ramadan and Eid al-Fitr. For this album, Rabbani covered several popular classic Eid al-Fitr songs in a nasheed style, including "Suara Takbir," originally performed by P. Ramlee. The album also includes one new song, "Ahlan Wa Sahlan Ya Ramadhan," written by Mujiburizal and Asri Ibrahim.The album was Rabbani's final studio release under KRU Music Group.

== Track listing ==
| No. | Title | Writer(s) | Original artist | Length |
|---|---|---|---|---|
| 1. | "Hikmah Ramadhan" | Asri Ibrahim; Sohibul Fadil; Sharifah Maisarah Syed Jamaluddin | Rabbani | 3:39 |
| 2. | "Ahlan Wasahlan Ya Ramadhan" | Mujiburizal; Asri Ibrahim | Rabbani | 4:19 |
| 3. | "Dari Jauh Ku Pohon Maaf" | S.Atan; Haron Abdul Majid | Sudirman | 3:51 |
| 4. | "Selamat Hari Raya (1)" | Kassim Masdor; Jins Shamsuddin | Fazedah Joned | 2:36 |
| 5. | "Salam Aidilfitri" | S.Atan; Jamaludin bin Sulik | Jamal Abdillah | 4:12 |
| 6. | "Selamat Hari Raya (2)" | P. Ramlee; Jamil Sulong | Ahmad Jais | 2:32 |
| 7. | "Keharmonian Hari Raya" | Mohd Asri Ubaidullah; Ito Lara | Harakat Madani | 3:31 |
| 8. | "Suatu Hari Di Hari Raya" | M.Nasir | M. Nasir | 3:21 |
| 9. | "Tangan Ku Hulur Maaf Ku Pohon" | S.Atan; Haron Abdul Majid | Al Mizan | 3:18 |
| 10. | "Takbir" | Copyright Control | N/A | 3:16 |
| 11. | "Suara Takbir" | P.Ramlee; S.Sudarmaji | P. Ramlee | 2:57 |
| Total length: | | | | 37:32 |

== Release and reception ==
Suara Takbir was released on 10 October 2005, coinciding with the 6th of Ramadan and distributed by EMI Music Malaysia. The album was nominated for Best Group Vocal Performance in an Album and Best Nasyid Album at the 13th Anugerah Industri Muzik in 2006.

== Personnel ==
Credits adapted from the album liner notes.

- Rabbani – vocal, vocal arrangement
- Asri Ibrahim – lead vocal, songwriter
- Amaludin Syukri Nasution – producer, music arrangement, musician
- Edry Abdul Halim – audio engineer, mixing, music arrangement, musician, A&R
- Sohibul Fadil – songwriter
- Sharifah Maisarah Syed Jamaluddin – songwriter
- Mujiburizal – songwriter
- S. Atan – songwriter
- Haron Abdul Majid – songwriter
- Kassim Masdor – songwriter
- Jins Shamsuddin – songwriter
- Jamaludin bin Sulik – songwriter
- P. Ramlee – songwriter
- Jamil Sulong – songwriter
- Mohd Asri Ubaidullah – songwriter
- Ito Lara – songwriter
- M. Nasir – songwriter
- S. Sudarmaji – songwriter
- Yuri – musician
- Fendy – recording engineer
- Shawal – makeup artist
- Dzull De Classique, Kajang – wardrobe
- AC, Nadia, Sara, Ryzal, Lindsay – promotion, marketing
- Sofea, Felicia, Mastika – online mall management
- Mastika, Lynn, Kudin – website

== Release history ==
| Region | Release date | Format | Label |
|---|---|---|---|
| Malaysia | 10 October 2005 | CD, digital download | KRU Music Group |
