= Mohammad Aman (disambiguation) =

Mohammad Aman may refer to:

- Mohammed Aman, Ethiopian runner
- Mohammed Aman (footballer), Saudi footballer
- Mohamed Aman (footballer), Yemeni footballer
- Mohammed Aman (detainee)
- Mohammad Aman, Afghan banker
