= Intifada (album) =

Studio album by Rabbani
- Released: December 20, 2000
- Recorded: 2000
- Studios: Nada Studio; Studio 21A; Pro Studio; Nova Studio; Bumble Bee Studio
- Genres: Nasheed; Contemporary
- Length: 45:48
- Labels: Permata Audio; EMI Music Malaysia
- Producers: Azmeer; Bong; KRU; LY; Pak Ngah; Zaid

Rabbani chronology
Iqrar 1421 (2000)	Intifada (2000)	Aman (2001)

Singles from Intifada
- 1. "Intifada" Released: December 2000; 2. "Cari Pasangan" Released: 2001; 3. "7 Hari" Released: 2001; 4. "Nawaitu" Released: 2001

Intifada ("Uprising") is the fourth studio album by Malaysian Nasheed group Rabbani. It was released in 20 December 2000 by Permata Audio and EMI Music Malaysia. The album sold over 70,000 copies, with the title track “Intifada” becoming one of Rabbani’s signature songs.

== Production ==
Following the commercial success of Pergi Tak Kembali, Rabbani began work on Intifada with the intention of broadening their musical direction. According to the group, the album’s title—meaning “uprising”—was inspired by the struggles for justice of Palestinians during the Second Intifada, which had begun a few months earlier that year, and symbolized a their renewal in sound while blending progressive and contemporary influences with traditional nasheed values.

The album incorporates a diverse range of musical styles, including dance music, Middle Eastern and Latin influences, Malay traditional music, R&B, and rap. Recording sessions were conducted across five studios: Nada Studio, Studio 21A, Pro Studio, Nova Studio, and Bumble Bee Studio.

The title track, “Intifada”, was composed by Malaysian boy band KRU with lyrics written by Sohibul Fadil. Azmeer contributed two tracks, “Lailatul Qadar” and “Kawan”, while Pak Ngah composed “Cari Pasangan”, a song influenced by Malay traditional music with lyrics also by Sohibul Fadil. “7 Hari”, written and composed by Mohd. Zaid Yusoff, incorporates world music elements and features a rap verse delivered in the Kelantan dialect. The album also includes “Nawaitu” and “Cahaya" composed by Bong, a songwriter and producer known for his work with Cromok and Amuk.

== Track listing ==
No.	Title	Writer(s)	Length
1.	"Intifada"	KRU; Sohibul Fadil	3:57
2.	"Insaf"	LY; Baiduri	5:37
3.	"7 Hari"	Mohd. Zaid Yusoff	4:22
4.	"Cahaya"	Azam Dungun; Bong	4:53
5.	"Lailatul Qadar"	Azmeer	4:24
6.	"Doa Dan Pujian"	Pak Ngah; Sohibul Fadil	5:09
7.	"Kawan"	Azmeer; Azadan Abdul Aziz	3:26
8.	"Cari Pasangan"	Pak Ngah; Sohibul Fadil	4:42
9.	"Ayah Ibu"	Baiduri; LY	4:33
10.	"Nawaitu"	Bong; Azam Dungun; Hamdan Md. Noor	4:40
Total length:			45:48

== Certifications ==
Region	Certification	Certified units/sales
Malaysia	Platinum	70,000

== Release and promotion ==
Intifada was released in 20 December 2000, with the title track serving as the album’s lead single. A music video for “Intifada” was produced in collaboration with Keretapi Tanah Melayu Berhad (KTMB).

== Reception ==
The album received positive reviews upon release. Writing for Berita Minggu, reviewer Roslen described Intifada as a well-arranged and high-quality album with appeal extending beyond Malay-speaking audiences. Commercially, the album sold more than 70,000 copies.

At the 9th Anugerah Industri Muzik, held on 20 April 2002, Intifada won the award for Best Nasheed Album.

== Personnel ==
Credits adapted from the album liner notes.

- KRU – composer, producer
- Sohibul Fadil – lyricist, executive producer
- Baiduri – lyricist
- LY – songwriter, producer
- Mohd. Zaid Yusoff – lyricist, songwriter
- Azam Dungun – lyricist
- Bong – lyricist, songwriter, producer
- Azmeer – lyricist, songwriter, producer
- Pak Ngah – songwriter, producer
- Azadan Abdul Aziz – lyricist
- Hamdan Md. Noor – lyricist
- Zaid – lyricist, songwriter, producer
- Mohd. Arzmy – executive producer
- Iqmal – A&R coordinator, advertising
- Miji – A&R coordinator
- Rina – A&R coordinator
- C. L. Toh – mastering
- Wan Kamaruddin – design concept, idea
- Simon – photography
- Why – make-up, wardrobe
- Erland Kok – marketing
- Jaja – new media
- Ann, Normaheran, Shima, Yatt – promotion

== Release history ==
Region	Release date	Format	Label
Malaysia	20 December 2000	CD, Digital download	Permata Audio; EMI Music Malaysia
