= Maulaya =

Studio album by Rabbani
- Released: June 2011
- Recorded: 2005
- Genres: Nasheed; Contemporary
- Length: 32:33
- Label: Rabbani Production

Rabbani chronology
Ketika Cinta (2011)	Maulaya (2011)	Lagenda Hit (2011)

Maulaya (My Lord) is the twelfth studio album by Malaysian nasheed group Rabbani. It was released in June 2011 by Rabbani Production.

== Background ==
Maulaya was recorded and mastered in Kuwait. It features six previously unreleased tracks by Rabbani with the late Asri Ibrahim. The album consists entirely of Arabic-language nasheed songs and heavily utilizes percussion instruments.

== Track listing ==
No.	Title	Writer(s)	Length
1.	"Tolaal Badru Alaina"	Copyright Control	3:22
2.	"Muhammad Ya Habibi"	Copyright Control	4:48
3.	"Maulana"	Mohd Asri Ubaidullah	8:44
4.	"Anta Ya Rahman"	Copyright Control	4:36
5.	"Solla'alaikallah"	Copyright Control	6:03
6.	"Sifatullah"	Asri Ibrahim; Mohd Asri Ubaidullah	5:00
Total length:			32:33

== Release and reception ==
Maulaya was released in June 2011 in Malaysia and distributed by Warner Music Malaysia. The album had been released earlier in Kuwait prior to its Malaysian release.

Aizat Ikhwan of Munsyeed.com described Maulaya as “a fresh and authentic nasyid album,” noting that it “features a fully Arabic approach and percussion-driven arrangements that create a distinctive sound.”

Feride Hikmet Atak of mStar described Maulaya as “a distinctive release featuring a fully Arabic approach,” highlighting “percussion-driven arrangements and Rabbani’s signature vocal strength, particularly the captivating voice of Ustaz Asri Ibrahim.”

== Release history ==
Region	Release date	Format	Label
Malaysia	June 2011	CD, digital download	Rabbani Productions
