= Rabbani (group) =

Malaysian nasheed group

- Origin: Kuala Lumpur, Malaysia
- Genre: Nasheed
- Years active: 1997–present
- Labels: Rabbani Productions; EMI Music Malaysia; KRU Music Group; Warner Music Malaysia; Permata Audio; Gulf Media (2005–2006, Kuwait only); Inteam; Sony Music Malaysia
- Members: Rahmat Shafie; Zulkiflee Azman; Muhd Loqman Abd. Aziz; Muhd Rithauddeen Yaakob; Azadan Abd Aziz; Muhd Afendi Shahbudin; Mohd Asri Baidullah @ Ubaidullah
- Past members: Mohd Asri Ibrahim (deceased); Hamzah Hasyim; Azizan Khalid (deceased); Mohd Nazim Mohamad; Mohd Aminuddin Sani; Nazrul Azhar Tamrin
- Website: www.rabbani.com.my

Rabbani is a Malaysian nasheed group, currently consisting of 8 members. Best known as a quasi-traditional nasyid group that incorporates modern aspects to its music.

== History ==
=== Pre-Rabbani and debuts ===
Before the group was formed, Mohammed Asri Ibrahim was part of NadaMurni, a nasheed group managed by the OVA recording company within Al-Arqam sect. After Al-Arqam was banned in 1994, NadaMurni was dissolved.

Rabbani was established on March 1, 1997 with 13 members and led by Mohammed Asri Ibrahim. Their first album 'self-titled' released in 1997 sold more than 90,000 copies.

=== Breakthrough success and line-up changes ===
Rabbani released ten more albums until 2005, in which it released the album Suara Takbir during Ramadhan. Rabbani tasted greater success with Pergi Tak Kembali and Intifada even though it has been criticised. They also released three compilation albums, the most recent one being Yalla Beena (English: Let's Go!) in 2004. After the death of the group leader and main vocalist, Mohamed Asri Ibrahim, from a heart attack on August 13, 2009, the group released the album Mahabbah in December 18, 2009.

== Discography ==
=== Studio albums ===
Malay and Arabic

- Rabbani (1997)
- Arah (1998)
- Pergi Tak Kembali (1999)
- Intifada (2001)
- Aman (2001)
- Qiblat (2002)
- Epik (2003)
- Suara Takbir (2005)
- Maulana (2005) [Initially released in Kuwait as "ألبوم مولانا" in Arabic. This was also their only album to be released under the Gulf Media label as the 2011 re-release of the same album re-titled "Maulaya" was released under a different label.]
- Nostalgia Nadamurni (2009)
- Mahabbah (2009)
- Maulaya (2011) [Re-release of "Maulana" in Malaysia, Brunei, Singapore, Indonesia and The Philippines. Originally released in Kuwait in 2005.]
- Yang Benar (2016)

=== Compilation albums ===
- Muhammad Ya Habibi (Rabbani/Harakat Madani) (1998)
- Ramadhan Remix (Rabbani/Harakat Madani) (1999)
- Iqrar 1421 (2000)
- Kenangan Lalu (2003)
- Yalla Beena (2004)
- Rabbani 1418-1428H (2008)
- Ketika Cinta (Rabbani, Harakat Madani & Durrani) (2011)
- Lagenda Hit (2011)
- Rabbani - One & Only (2013)
- Terunggul Rabbani (2014)
- Koleksi Emas (2015)

=== Singles and songs ===
- Masa Berlalu (2006) - Maulidur Rasul National Level, Stadium Negara
- Dalam KalimahMu (2009) - Nur Ar-Rahman RTM - TV2 Telemovie Theme Song
- Syahadah (2009) - Syahadah RTM - TV1 Programme Theme Song. Re-sung by other members with revised lyrics and included in Mahabbah album.

== Concerts and tours ==
- Rabbani - Live in Kuwait (2006) : Maharjaan Al Kuwait Enshadi
- Rabbani - Malam Sinar Maulidur Rasul 1427 Hijrah (2006)
- Rabbani - Malam Sinar Maulidur Rasul 1430 Hijrah (2009) : Stadium Malawati, Shah Alam, Selangor
- Rabbani - Maulidur Rasul 1431 Hijrah (2010) : Taman Tamadun Islam, Pulau Wan Man, Terengganu
- Expo Gaya Hidup Islam (2015): Pusat Dagangan Terengganu (TTC), Kuala Terengganu, Terengganu
