= Ammann =

Ammann is a surname of German origin which is an alternative spelling of Amtmann or Amman, an historical kind of bailiff. Notable people with the surname include:

- Alberto Ammann, Argentine actor (born 1978)
- Daniel Ammann, Swiss author and journalist (born 1963)
- Erwin Ammann, German politician and co-founder of the Christian Social Union of Bavaria (1916 – 2000)
- Gretel Ammann (1947–2000), Spanish philosopher, writer and activist
- Jakob Ammann, Swiss anabaptist leader and founder of the Amish (c. 1644 – c. 1730)
- Johann Conrad Ammann, Swiss physician and fossil collector (1724 – 1811)
- Johann Konrad Ammann, Swiss physician and instructor of deaf persons (1669 – 1724)
- Johann Schneider-Ammann, Swiss politician (born 1952)
- Luis Alberto Ammann, Argentine politician and journalist (1942 – 2020)
- Mike Ammann, American soccer player (born 1971)
- Othmar Ammann, structural engineer who built many of New York City's bridges (1879 – 1965)
- Robert Ammann, American amateur mathematician with contributions to aperiodic tilings (1946 – 1994)
- Simon Ammann, Swiss ski jumper (born 1981)
- Thomas Ammann, Swiss art dealer and collector (1950 – 1993)

== See also ==
- Ammann Group, a Swiss mechanical engineering company, founded in 1869 by Jakob Ammann
- an unusual alternative spelling of the Jordanian capital Amman
- Amman (disambiguation)
- Amtmann (surname)
- Landammann
