= Ramadhan Remix =

Compilation album by: Rabbani; Harakat Madani
- Released: December 1998
- Recorded: 1998
- Genres: Nasheed; Contemporary
- Length: 49:50
- Labels: Permata Audio; EMI Music Malaysia
- Producers: Amaluddin; Isman Nadim; Zaid Yusof; Asri Ibrahim; Sokhibul Fadhil

Rabbani chronology
Muhammad Ya Habibi (1998)	Ramadhan Remix (1998)	Pergi Tak Kembali (1999)

Ramadhan Remix is the second compilation album by Malaysian nasheed groups Rabbani and Harakat Madani. It was released in December 1998 by Permata Audio and EMI Music Malaysia in conjunction with the holy month of Ramadan. The album comprises songs centred on the themes of Ramadan and Eid al-Fitr, and includes excerpts from hadith, Quranic verses, zikr, and takbir.

== Background and production ==
Ramadhan Remix features Malaysian nasheed groups Rabbani and Harakat Madani. Both groups selected songs that focus on the spiritual significance and purity of the holy month of Ramadan, as well as the celebration of Eid al-Fitr.

The album was produced by Amaluddin, Isman Nadim, Zaid Yusof, Asri Ibrahim, and Sokhibul Fadhil. It includes eight new tracks, interspersed with zikr, excerpts from hadith, Quranic verses, and Eid takbir, blending devotional content with contemporary nasheed arrangements.

== Track listing ==
No.	Title	Writer(s)	Original album	Length
1.	"Zikir" (Harakat Madani)	Mohamad Asri	N/A	1:58
2.	"Ramadhan Bulan Mulia" (Harakat Madani)	Sokhibul Fadhil	N/A	3:07
3.	"Maksud Hadith 1" (Rabbani)	Mohamad Asri	N/A	0:42
4.	"Hikmah Ramadhan" (Rabbani)	Asri Ibrahim; Sokhibul Fadhil	N/A	3:44
5.	"Hadith Riwayat Ibnu Mas'Od" (Rabbani)	Mohamad Asri	N/A	1:03
6.	"Aidil Fitri Hari Mulia" (Harakat Madani)	Amaluddin Mohd Napiah; Sokhibul Fadhil	N/A	3:46
7.	"Surah Luqman Ayat 2-5" (Rabbani)	Mohamad Asri	N/A	1:31
8.	"Tholaal Badru 'Alaina" (Rabbani)	Copyright Control	Rabbani	5:11
9.	"Keharmonian Di Hari Raya" (Harakat Madani)	Mohd. Asri Ubaidullah; Khairul Anuar	N/A	3:57
10.	"Takbir Hari Raya" (Harakat Madani)	Copyright Control	N/A	5:06
11.	"Solla' Alaikallah" (Rabbani)	Copyright Control	Rabbani	5:42
12.	"Maksud Hadith" (Rabbani)	Mohamad Asri	N/A	0:32
13.	"Selawat Nabi" (Rabbani)	Asri Ibrahim; Nazim Mohamed	Arah	4:29
14.	"Surah Al-Baqarah Ayat 183" (Rabbani)	Copyright Control	N/A	0:29
15.	"Menjelang Hari Raya" (Harakat Madani)	Harakat Madani; Isman Nadim	N/A	4:35
16.	"Di Ambang Syawal" (Rabbani)	Zaid Yusoff; Nazim Mohamed	N/A	3:58
Total length:				49:50

== Certifications ==
Region	Certification	Certified units/sales
Malaysia	Platinum	30,000

== Release and reception ==
Ramadhan Remix was released in December 1998 to coincide with the Islamic holy month of Ramadan.

Saniboey of the Harian Metro described the album as “the best Eid al-Fitr and Ramadan album,” praising not only the nasheed melodies performed by the two groups but also the clarity of its message. He noted that the album stood out for combining strong devotional themes with meaningful lyrical content.

== Personnel ==
Credits adapted from the album liner notes.

- Rabbani – vocals
- Harakat Madani – vocals
- Sokhibul Fadhil – composer, lyricist, producer
- Amaluddin Mohd Napiah – composer, producer
- Isman Nadim – composer, producer
- Zaid Yusoff – composer, producer
- Asri Ibrahim – composer, lyricist, producer
- Mohamad Asri – composer, lyricist
- Mohd. Asri Ubaidullah – lyricist
- Nazim Mohamed – lyricist
- Khairul Anuar – lyricist

== Release history ==
Region	Release date	Format	Label
Malaysia	December 1998	CD, digital download	Permata Audio; EMI Music Malaysia
