= Amman (surname) =

Amman is a surname of German origin. It is an occupational surname for an Ammann, an administrative position in Medieval and early modern German-speaking countries. Notable people with the surname include:

- Johann Amman (1707–1741), Swiss-Russian botanist
- Jost Amman (1539–1591), Swiss artist
- Mir Amman, Urdu writer
- Paul Amman (1634–1691), German physician and botanist
- Members of the D'Amman family, a patrician family from the Canton of Fribourg, Switzerland
