= Nostalgia Nadamurni =

Studio album by Rabbani
- Released: December 30, 2008
- Recorded: 2008
- Genre: Nasheed; Contemporary
- Length: 45:50
- Label: Inteam Records; Rabbani Production
- Producer: Salleh Brothers

Rabbani chronology
Rabbani 1418-1428H (2007)	Nostalgia Nadamurni (2008)	Mahabbah (2009)

Singles from Nostalgia Nadamurni
- 1. "Bila Nur Melimpah Di Hati" Released: 2008

Nostalgia Nadamurni is the tenth studio album by Malaysian nasheed group Rabbani. It was released on 30 December 2008 by Inteam Records and Rabbani Production.

== Background ==
Nostalgia Nadamurni was produced by Mohd. Salleh Mohamed Deril, a member of the nasheed group Brothers. The album was a tribute to Rabbani's former group, Nada Murni, and features newly recorded versions of classic nasheed songs by the group.

According to Rabbani lead vocalist Asri Ibrahim, the album was created as a gift to fans of nasheed music who had long supported Rabbani since they were known as Nada Murni. The album consists of ten songs, re-recorded with simple percussion-based arrangements while retaining their nostalgic elements. All songs were composed by Asri Ibrahim, except “Jasa Petani”, which he co-wrote with Farihin Abdul Fattah. ITO Lara and Pahrol Md. Joui each wrote the lyrics for one song: ITO Lara wrote the lyrics for "Bila Nur Melimpah Di Hati", while Pahrol Md. Joui wrote the lyrics for "Indahnya Hidup Bersama Ilahi". It was Rabbani's final album to feature lead vocalist and group leader Asri Ibrahim, who passed away on 13 August 2009.

== Track listing ==
No.	Title	Writer(s)	Length
1.	"Bila Nur Melimpah Di Hati"	Asri Ibrahim; ITO Lara	4:40
2.	"Ibu Mithali"	Asri Ibrahim; Copyright Control	4:27
3.	"Al Hijrah" (feat. Ustaz Amaluddin)	Asri Ibrahim; Copyright Control	4:27
4.	"Sunnah Berjuang"	Asri Ibrahim; Copyright Control	4:27
5.	"Sifat 20"	Asri Ibrahim; Copyright Control	5:19
6.	"Nun Di Sana"	Asri Ibrahim; Copyright Control	3:37
7.	"Indahnya Hidup Bersama Ilahi"	Asri Ibrahim; Pahrol Md. Joui	4:22
8.	"Mana Milik Kita"	Asri Ibrahim; Copyright Control	4:59
9.	"Jasa Petani"	Asri Ibrahim; Farihin Abdul Fattah; Copyright Control	5:00
10.	"Ayyu Zikraa" (feat. Ustaz Amaluddin)	Asri Ibrahim; Copyright Control	4:32
Total length:			45:50

== Release and reception ==
The album was released on 30 December 2008 by Inteam Records and distributed by Warner Music Malaysia. It won two awards at the 16th Anugerah Industri Muzik.

== Personnel ==
Credits adapted from the album liner notes.

- Rabbani – vocals
- Asri Ibrahim – lead vocals, songwriter
- Salleh Brothers – producer
- Ustaz Amaluddin – featured vocals (tracks 3 and 10)
- Pahrol Md. Joui – songwriter
- Farihin Abdul Fattah – songwriter
- ITO Lara – songwriter
- Eddie Slam – music arrangement
- Hamzah Perkusi – mixing

== Accolades ==
Award(s)	Year	Recipient(s)	Nominated work(s)	Category	Result	Ref(s)
Anugerah Industri Muzik	2009	Rabbani	Nostalgia Nadamurni	Album of the Year	Nominated	
Anugerah Industri Muzik	2009	Rabbani	Nostalgia Nadamurni	Best Nasyid Album	Won	
Anugerah Industri Muzik	2009	Rabbani	Bila Nur Melimpah Di Hati	Best Nasyid Song	Won	
Anugerah Industri Muzik	2009	Rabbani	Bila Nur Melimpah Di Hati	Best Group Vocal Performance In an Album	Nominated	

== Release history ==
Region	Release date	Format	Label
Malaysia	30 December 2008	CD, digital download	Inteam Records
