= Maulana (Rabbani album) =

Studio album by Rabbani
- Released: September 2007
- Recorded: 2006–2007
- Genres: Nasheed; Contemporary
- Length: 48:27
- Labels: Rabbani Productions; EMI Music Malaysia
- Producers: Yasin Sulaiman; Rabbani

Rabbani chronology
Suara Takbir (2005)	Maulana (2007)	Rabbani 1418–1428H (2007)

Singles from Maulana
- 1. "Berpaut Pada Sabda Mu" Released: 2007

Maulana is the ninth studio album by Malaysian nasheed group Rabbani. It was released in September 2007 through their own label, Rabbani Productions with EMI Music Malaysia.

== Background ==
After the release of Suara Takbir in 2005, Rabbani took a hiatus from releasing studio albums. In 2007, the group returned with Maulana, their first studio album produced under Rabbani Productions.

The album features praises for the Prophet Muhammad S.A.W. and nasheed songs. For this album, Rabbani re-recorded several classical Arabic religious songs, including "Maulana", "Maulaya", "Sollaalaikallah", and "Ya Rasulallah". It includes two newly composed tracks: "Berpaut Pada SabdaMu", composed by Daqmie with lyrics by Ad Samad, and "Rabiul Awal", written by Yusuf Sabri. Rabbani also recorded a new version of "Junjungan Mulia", originally by the Singaporean nasheed group Al-Mizan.

== Track listing ==
No.	Title	Writer(s)	Length
1.	"Intro: Al-Jannah"	Copyright Control	0:40
2.	"Berpaut Pada Sabda Mu"	Daqmie; Ad Samad	4:33
3.	"Rawi Berzanji 1"	Copyright Control	0:50
4.	"Maulana"	Mohd Asri Ubaidullah	5:30
5.	"Marhaban 1"	Copyright Control	1:55
6.	"Rabiul Awal"	Yusuf Sabri	3:49
7.	"Rawi Berzanji 2"	Copyright Control	1:32
8.	"Maulaya"	Asri Ibrahim; Copyright Control	5:00
9.	"Marhaban 2"	Copyright Control	2:02
10.	"Solla alaikallah"	Copyright Control	3:52
11.	"Rawi Berzanji 3"	Copyright Control	0:47
12.	"Junjungan Mulia"	S. Atan; Amir Bin Mohamed Karem	4:04
13.	"Marhaban 3"	Copyright Control	1:37
14.	"Ya Rasulallah"	Mohd Asri Ubaidullah; Asri Ibrahim	4:42
15.	"Rawi Berzanji 4"	Copyright Control	0:48
16.	"Panduan Bermaulid"	Copyright Control; Asri Ibrahim; Sohibul Fadil	5:10
17.	"Rawi Berzanji 5"	Copyright Control	1:36
Total length:			48:27

== Release and reception ==
Maulana was released in September 2007 and distributed by EMI Music Malaysia. The album was nominated for Album of the Year and won Best Nasyid Album at the 15th Anugerah Industri Muzik in 2008.

== Personnel ==
Credits adapted from the album liner notes.

- Rabbani – vocals
- Asri Ibrahim – lead vocals, songwriter
- Yasin Sulaiman - producer, arranger
- Daqmie – songwriter
- Ad Samad – songwriter
- Mohd Asri Ubaidullah – songwriter
- Yusuf Sabri – songwriter
- S. Atan – songwriter
- Amir Bin Mohamed Karem – songwriter
- Sohibul Fadil – songwriter
- CL.Toh - mastering
- Zairi - mixing

== Release history ==
Region	Release date	Format	Label
Malaysia	September 2007	CD, digital download	Rabbani Productions; EMI Music Malaysia
