= Gretel Ammann =

- Born: Margarita Ammann Martínez; 17 January 1947; San Sebastián, Spain
- Died: 2 May 2000 (aged 53); Barcelona, Spain
- Education: University of Barcelona
- Occupations: Philosopher; essayist; activist
- Known for: Feminism pioneer in Barcelona
- Political party: Communist Movement of Catalonia
- Movement: Radical feminism; Feminist separatism

Margarita Ammann Martínez, better known as Gretel Ammann (17 January 1947 – 2 May 2000) was a Spanish philosopher, essayist, activist, radical feminist, and lesbian separatist. She was a pioneer of feminism in Barcelona.

== Early years and education ==
Margarita Ammann Martínez was born in San Sebastián. Her mother was Basque and her father was Austrian, a fugitive from Nazi Germany. When she was two years old, the family moved to Barcelona, where she lived the rest of her life. From childhood, she was trained in different artistic disciplines, including writing, drawing, photography and music. During her baccalaureate and elementary school studies she studied at the German school in Barcelona, where she created her first magazine, in which she was very critical of the school's policies, leading her to being asked to leave.

Ammann studied philosophy and literature at the University of Barcelona. In the first year, she organized a public poetry reading in which she performed her own poetry, accompanying herself on guitar with her own composition. She also established a student magazine. In 1971, Ammann went to Paris for a year, where she studied at the Sorbonne and learned French, one of five languages that she spoke fluently. After returning to Barcelona, she worked in various schools and academies before entering the Escola Tramuntana in El Carmel.

== Career ==
=== Activist ===
Ammann's involvement with working families led her to settle in the same neighbourhood where she worked, El Carmel, and to get involved in the politics of the neighbourhood and her school. Working in a clandestine manner in different militant parties and collectives, in 1976 Ammann joined the Communist Movement of Catalonia, which was Trotskyist-leaning. She was an active participant in movements in favour of peace and disarmament, ecology and human rights, but was above all an activist in the movimiento feminista and a defender of women's rights. She was a leader in lesbian issues in Catalonia and the rest of Spain.

=== Feminist ===
Throughout her life Ammann combined militancy and activism with her artistic side. From a very young age, she participated in the creation and promotion of women's groups and publications, most of them financed with her own money. In 1976, she participated in the first Jornadas Catalanas de la Mujer. In 1978, she created the first musical group of women. In the following year, she presented her work "Feminism of Difference" at the 2nd Jornadas Estatales sobre la Mujer en Granada, which served as a starting point for the long discussion of feminism throughout the Spanish state that would take place in the following years.

In 1980, with three friends, Ammann opened the first Casa de la Dona on Cardenal Casanyes Street in Barcelona. This was the beginning of an intense feminist militancy. Ideologically, she defined herself as a radical feminist and lesbian separatist. She translated and published the SCUM manifesto of Valerie Solanas, and contributed to the Spanish version of the book "Our bodies, our lives" by the Boston women's collective (ed. Icaria). In 1981, she created Amazonas magazine, an exclusively lesbian publication, and participated in the first television program on lesbianism broadcast by public television in the country.

In 1984, Ammann founded the Center for Women's Studies "El Centro", a non-profit association from which various entities and projects would emerge. She was actively involved in the foundation of various different women's initiatives, such as the Assembly of Independent Feminists of Barcelona, the Cultural Association of Women "La Nostra Illa", Gram Teatro de mujeres, the first feminist summer school, and the "Amazonas" network that organized the First Lesbian Week in Barcelona in 1987, with European participation.

== Work ==
In 1989, Ammann created the magazine Laberint, whose heading stated: "This magazine aims to open a debate from Radical Feminism and Separatist Lesbianism. For this, we contribute reflections, discussion, creations and information". There were 36 issues published, the last of them in 1999. Ammann contributed on behalf of all the demands of women's spaces, such as Casa la dona and the Francesca Bonmaison Women's Culture Center, as well as in the establishment of the Feminist Network of Catalonia. Most of Ammann's work was developed in conferences, meetings, journals, and assemblies, and was not published, or was published in what is called grey literature, which does not use the usual channels of production and distribution. Upon her death in 2000, the Feminist Network published a compilation book of some of these texts, with the title Escritos ("Writings"). Her file of feminist documentation was donated to the Documentation Center of Ca la Dona, by her companion of the previous 18 years, Dolors Majoral.
