= Bernard Amtmann =

Austrian-born Canadian antiquarian bookseller

Bernard Amtmann (1907–1979) was an Austrian-born Canadian antiquarian bookseller, bibliographer, publisher. He founded of Montreal Book Auctions in 1967 and the Antiquarian Booksellers Association of Canada in 1966. He was born in Vienna, Austria in 1907.

Amtmann immigrated to Canada in 1947 to join his brother William Amtmann in Ottawa where he started a small antiquarian bookselling business, issuing his first catalogue by 1948. He transferred his business to Montreal in 1950 and began to specialize in Canadiana. In 1967 Amtmann founded Montreal Book Auctions Ltd. to further promote Canadiana. Following Amtmann's death in January 1979, Montreal Book Auctions was sold to Canada Book Auctions Ltd. and relocated to Toronto.

Bernard Amtmann was the moving force behind the foundation of the Antiquarian Booksellers' Association of Canada in 1966 and served as its first president. He made a significant contribution to the field of Canadian bibliography, publishing a number of bibliographies and bibliographic tools, most notably his four-volume Contributions to a Short-Title Catalogue of Canadiana (1971–1973), The Arctic Bibliography, and Contributions to a Dictionary of Canadian Pseudonyms (1973).

== Honorary Degree ==
Amtmann received an honorary Doctor of Laws degree from the University of Saskatchewan Regina Campus.

== Bernard Amtmann Fellowship Award ==
First awarded in 1992, and offered in his memory through the Bibliographic Society of Canada, the Bernard Amtmann Fellowship award is handed out every three years to a scholar in one of four areas of interest: Candiana, book collecting, bookselling, and bibliography.
