= Maledictology =

Research into cursing and swearing

Maledictology is the branch of psychology that investigates emotional expression through swearing. Swearing is defined as ‘uttering offensive emotional speech’. One of the main theories explaining swearing is the Neuro-Psycho-Social theory. This theory uses a multi-disciplinary approach to understand the causes and uses of swearing. For example, potential uses include slang, humour elicitation, and expression of emotion. Maledictology research is limited as psychologists and linguists who research swearing often categorize their findings separately.

Maledictology is highly influenced by American psychologist Timothy Jay (Massachusetts College of Liberal Arts), and professor Reinhold Aman (California). Aman was also the founder of Maledicta: The International Research Center for the Study of Verbal Aggression, which published articles about maledictology.

== Etymology ==
The word maledictology derives from the Latin word maledicere, which means "to say [something] bad", and the Greek word logia, which means the “study of.” Together, this translates to the “study of saying something bad.”

== History ==
Opus Maledictum: A Book of Bad Words was first published in 1996 with an early mention of maledictology. In 1975, the International Maledicta Society was established. Its aim was to conduct multidisciplinary study on verbal aggression. However, as of 2009, it is no longer is active. Maledictology is featured in psychological research thanks to Reinhold Aman’s books and maledictology-dedicated research journal, and Timothy Jay’s books and published research. Swearing as a practice has existed and been researched in fields such as linguistics, anthropology, and sociology since the 1900s.

== Neuro-Psycho-Social Theory (1999) ==
The Neuro-Psycho-Social Theory was developed by psychologist Timothy Jay. In his book Why We Curse (1999), Jay outlines the theory's purpose: it can predict the circumstances in which certain individuals would swear and explain why curse words are used. To do so, the theory defines rules that organise cursing as a systematic phenomenon. It is explained by the three interlocking systems that make up its name: the neurological, psychological, and socio-cultural aspects of human nature. Each system’s role is crucial to the overall theory, as one cannot function without the others.

=== Neural ===
The neurological section of the theory proposes that cursing is partially controlled by the brain and the nervous system. The two most important neural systems to the NPS theory are the cerebral cortex and the subcortical system. The cerebral cortex contains higher-level cognitive functions, including perception, decision making, motor planning, and language. The subcortical system helps to organise information so the body can react to stimuli. These systems' functions are crucial to verbal expression, which extends to cursing. In his book, Jay cites two major pieces of evidence for neurology’s role in cursing: Jackon’s spectrum of propositional speech, and the right hemisphere theory.

=== Psychological ===
The psychological section of the theory assumes that a speaker’s linguistic capability is a result of psychological development. This development is a combination of psychological makeup and learning history. Psychological makeup is the genetic tendencies, behaviours and traits acquired and affected by learning. It is then expressed through language, sometimes in the form of cursing. Common personality traits associated with swearing are anger, religiosity, and sexual awareness. Learning history explains how children learn what curse words are and the appropriate circumstances to say them in. Children do this by building a mental model centred around what is considered rude in relevant contexts. They then apply this model and continue to develop it as part of their linguistic abilities.

=== Sociocultural ===
The sociocultural section of the theory identifies markers that speakers use to measure a word’s appropriateness, which affects the likelihood of the word being spoken. Two main factors influence this likelihood; the pragmatic factors and the cultural factors. Pragmatic factors include the conversation topic discussed, the relationship between speakers, and the environment. The cultural factor focuses on what a cultural group decides is offensive or taboo. Words deemed culturally offensive are not spoken in respect of cultural norms. Both pragmatic factors and cultural factors combined give the speaker the tools necessary to decide whether to use a curse word.

== Maledicta: The International Journal on Aggression ==
Reinhold Aman’s journal, Maledicta: The International Journal on Aggression, was the first research journal dedicated to aggressive language. Specifically, it investigated etymology, origin, meaning, and use amongst other subjects. It has had no new publications since 2005. Aman, the publisher, founder, and editor-in-chief, died in 2019.

== Opus Maledictum: A Book of Bad Words ==
Reinhold Aman’s book, Opus Maledictum (1996), contains several of the articles published in his research journal Maleditca. In book form, these articles address many different examples of cursing, describing slang, jargon, profanity, slurs, and offensive language in many cultural contexts. New insights suggest that the meanings and usage Aman originally identified may have changed with time.

== Maledictology Online ==
The rise in swearing research addresses social media as a new platform for communication. As social media has created a new online setting, this environment developed its own norms and rules for the acceptability of swearing. Social media also offers a new way to analyse swearing patterns, which has already been applied to platforms such as Twitter. Researchers have focused on the transition of swearwords to an online basis, attempted to predict cursing online, and integrated cognitive theories to explain swearing on social media.

== Obstacles of Maledictology ==
Timothy Jay has mentioned the challenges he has faced when wanting to study maledictology, referencing the academia world’s dismissal of ‘taboo-word research.’ Reinhold also expressed his negative experience as a pioneer in maledictology, regularly criticised by editors and reviewers. In the present day, the previously unenthusiastic attitude towards swearing in both a conversational and research context has eased. Despite this progress, Jay identified several crucial points in psychological advancement where maledictology could have developed earlier. His primary example is the research into Broca’s area and its role in critical language. Using the NPS theory, Jay suggests that Broca’s dismissal of swearing as actual speech was incorrect.

Currently, a major obstacle to maledictology’s advancement is the lack of proper categorisation. Swearing and maledictology are sometimes identified as separate fields in research, which could further delay the development of maledictology.

== Literature ==
- Jay, Timothy: Why We Curse. A Neuro-Psycho-Social Theory of Speech. John Benjamins Publishing, 2000, ISBN 1-55619-758-6
- Aman, Reinhold: Opus Maledictorum. A Book of Bad Words. Marlowe & Co, 1996, ISBN 1-56924-836-2
- Aman, Reinhold: Bayrisch-Österreichisches Schimpfwörterbuch. Allitera Verlag, 2005, ISBN 3-86520-095-8
- Aman, Reinhold: Maledicta: The International Journal of Verbal Aggression (19772005).
- Grassi, Natascia: La Traduzione degli Insulti nel Doppiaggio di Film Americani / The Translation of Insults into Italian Dubbing Language of American Movies. Tesi di Laurea, Università di Bologna, Anno Accademico 2002–2003.
