= Maledicta =

- Discipline: Linguistics, profanity
- Language: English
- Edited by: Reinhold Aman

Publication details
- History: 1977–2005
- Publisher: Reinhold Aman

Standard abbreviations
- ISO 4: Maledicta

Indexing
- ISSN: 0363-3659
- LCCN: 77649633
- OCLC no.: 3188018

Links
- Journal homepage

Maledicta, The International Journal of Verbal Aggression, was an academic journal dedicated to the study of offensive and negatively valued words and expressions, also known as maledictology. Its main areas of interest were the origin, etymology, meaning, use, and influence of vulgar, obscene, aggressive, abusive, and blasphemous language. It was published from 1977 until 2005. The publisher, founder, and editor-in-chief was Reinhold Aman (April 8, 1936 – March 2, 2019).
