= Mahabbah (Rabbani album) =

Studio album by Rabbani
- Released: December 18, 2009
- Recorded: 2007; 2009
- Studios: Nasyeed.Com Studio; Ada Studio; Inteam Studio; Sutra Studio
- Genres: Nasheed; Contemporary
- Length: 40:49
- Label: Rabbani Production
- Producer: Daqmie

Rabbani chronology
Nostalgia Nadamurni (2008)	Mahabbah (2009)	Zikir Penambat Rindu (2011)

Singles from Mahabbah
- 1. "Nurul Iman" Released: 2009

Mahabbah (Love) is the eleventh studio album by Malaysian nasheed group Rabbani. It was released on 18 December 2009 by Rabbani Production.

== Background ==
After lead vocalist Asri Ibrahim passed away on 13 August 2009, Zulkiflee Azman officially took over as lead vocalist on 20 August. According to Azadan, a member of Rabbani, a few months before his passing, Asri had told a concert promoter, "If I am not around, it is fine because Zul can sing," indicating that he suggested Zulkiflee as his replacement. Azadan added that Zulkiflee's vocals are more universal compared to Asri Ibrahim's, which were more influenced by Middle Eastern styles.

Rabbani then began work on their new album. Mahabbah was recorded at four studios in early November 2009. All songs were performed by Zulkiflee, except for "Inikah Petanda," which had been recorded two years earlier with Asri Ibrahim and featured Mawi. The album was produced by Daqmie, who also composed five of its songs. It includes the song "Kejora Sinar Zaman," dedicated to the late Asri Ibrahim, and a longer version of the theme song for the RTM television program Syahadah.

== Track listing ==
No.	Title	Writer(s)	Length
1.	"Kata Kata Hikmah I"		0:12
2.	"Mahabbah"	Daqmie; Ummu Hani	5:20
3.	"Kata Kata Hikmah II"		0:19
4.	"Kejora Sinar Zaman"	Daqmie; Sohibul Fadil	5:12
5.	"Kata Kata Hikmah III"		0:16
6.	"Syahadah"	Daqmie; Sohibul Fadil; Abu Hassan Morad	4:51
7.	"Kata Kata Hikmah IV"		0:24
8.	"Nurul Iman"	Daqmie; Ummu Hani	4:42
9.	"Kata Kata Hikmah V"		0:16
10.	"Bicara Hijrah"	Daqmie; Sohibul Fadil	4:31
11.	"Kata Kata Hikmah VI"		0:13
12.	"Ya Man Satufariq"	Copyright Control	4:30
13.	"Kata Kata Hikmah VII"		0:20
14.	"Tanpa Agama"	Copyright Control	5:21
15.	"Kata Kata Hikmah VIII"		0.16
16.	"Inikah Petanda" (feat. Mawi)	Amaludin Syukri Nasution	4.06
Total length:			40:49

== Release and reception ==
Mahabbah was released on 18 December 2009 with “Nurul Iman” as the lead single. The album was sponsored by PRM Global and distributed by Warner Music Malaysia. The album was nominated for Best Nasyid Album and Best Nasyid Song at the 17th Anugerah Industri Muzik in 2010.

== Personnel ==
Credits adapted from the album liner notes.

- Mohd Asri Ubaidullah – executive producer
- Daqmie – songwriter, producer, vocal producer, arrangement, mixing, loops
- Sohibul Fadil – songwriter, vocal producer
- Ummu Hani – songwriters
- Abu Hassan Morad – songwriters
- Amaludin Syukri Nasution - songwriter, music arrangement ("Inikah Patanda")
- Amin Nordin – vocal producer
- Rudy Muhammed – music arrangement ("Tanpa Agama"),programming
- Eddie Marzuki – music arrangement ("Iman"), programming, acoustic guitar
- Along Exist – programming, loops
- Ujang – drums
- Kelly - bass
- Eddrie Hashim – guitar
- Rohaslam Hizad – flute
- Hamzah, Acul & Fendi – Latin percussion
- Gieka - Malay percussion
- Nasyeed.Com Studio, Ada Studio, Inteam Studio, Sutra Studio – recording studios
- Zairi Arilfin – mixing, recording engineer
- King AlGebra, Amin Nordin – mixing engineers
- Sutra Studio – mixing studio
- CL Toh – mastering
- Adik Mohd Izwan Izzuddin b. Azadan & Adik Mohd Hafez b. Sohibul Fadhil – background vocals
- Frizdan – photography
- Mohd. Affandi Shahbudin– concept & design
- Azadan Abd. Aziz – promotion
- Azrul Aswad A. Karim – A&R

== Release history ==
Region	Release date	Format	Label
Malaysia	18 December 2009	CD, digital download	Rabbani Productions
