= Amann =

Amann is a German surname. Notable people with the surname include:

- Anton Amann (1956–2015), Austrian chemist
- Betty Amann (1905–1990), German-American actress
- Chris Amann, a doctor for the WWE
- Diane Marie Amann, American legal scholar
- Émile Amann (1880–1948), French historian
- Gregor Amann (born 1962), German politician (SPD)
- Herbert Amann (1919–1944), German Wehrmacht officer and Iron Cross recipient
- James Amann (born 1956), American politician
- Jules Amann (1859–1939), Swiss botanist and pharmacist
- Jürg Amann (1947–2013), Swiss writer and dramatist
- Max Amann (1891–1957), German Nazi politician, journalist and SS general
- Max Amann (water polo) (1905–1945), German water polo player
- Melanie Amann (born 1978), German journalist
- Urs Amann (1951–2019), Swiss painter

== See also ==
- Aman (disambiguation)
- Amann & Söhne, a manufacturing firm
