= A.M.A.N. (TV series) =

- A.M.A.N.
- Also known as: A.M.A.N. - Etairia Perpatimenis Euthinis
- Genre: Parody/Satire Show
- Developed by: A.M.A.N. Productions
- Directed by: Antonis Kanakis
- Creative director: Christos Kiousis
- Presented by: Antonis Kanakis; Sotiris Kalivatsis
- Country of origin: Greece
- No. of seasons: 4

Production
- Running time: 60 minutes

Original release
- Network: Mega Channel (1997); ANT1 (1997-2000)
- Release: May 1997 – June 2000

A.M.A.N., was a Greek television parody show and the natural continuation of another TV show called Comfuzio that was aired by ERT3 in the early 1990s. A.M.A.N began after the death of their friend and broadcaster Antonis Pararas and the capital letters translates the word "Αντώνη Μας Άφησες Νωρίς" which means "Antonis you left us early". A.M.A.N. began in May 1997 at Mega Channel, but only 9 episodes were aired. Since October 1997 and up until 2000, the show was broadcast by ANT1 television. The hosts were Antonis Kanakis (Αντώνης Κανάκης) and Sotiris Kalivatsis (Σωτήρης Καλυβάτσης), with a variety of supporting players, most notable Giannis Servettas (Γιάννης Σερβέτας). Spin-offs of the show were the series A.M.A.N. Τα Καθάρματα (A.M.A.N The Bastards) (originally an unrelated show to A.M.A.N., but later mutated into a spin-off/continuation of A.M.A.N.), Oi Treis Files, Haivania 3-0 and Giannis o omorfos.

== See also ==
- List of programs broadcast by ANT1
