= Pergi Tak Kembali =

Studio album by Rabbani
- Released: December 1999
- Recorded: 1999
- Genre: Nasheed
- Length: 50:00
- Label: Permata Audio; EMI Music Malaysia
- Producer: KRU; Zaid Yusof; Yusri Yusoff; B. Nury

Rabbani chronology
Ramadhan Remix (1998)	Pergi Tak Kembali (1999)	Iqrar 1421 (2000)

Singles from Pergi Tak Kembali
- 1. "Pergi Tak Kembali" Released: 1999

Pergi Tak Kembali is the third studio album by Malaysian nasheed group Rabbani. It was released in December 1999 by Permata Audio and EMI Music Malaysia.

== Production ==
Following two successful albums, Rabbani planned to release an album with a more modern and upbeat sound, moving away from traditional nasheed. Pergi Tak Kembali incorporates contemporary and alternative Nasheed elements to appeal to younger listeners.The album was co-produced by KRU, Zaid Yusof, Yusri Yusoff and B. Nury.

The songs 'Pergi Tak Kembali' and 'Masa' were composed and produced by KRU, with lyrics penned by B. Nury. Both tracks took only five days to complete. Rabbani also recorded a new rendition of 'Insan', a song originally performed by Yantzen, for the albums.

The album features Quranic and Hadith recitations interspersed throughout its 16 tracks.

== Track listing ==
No.	Title	Writer(s)	Length
1.	"Pergi Tak Kembali"	KRU, B. Nury	4:03
2.	"Riwayat Al-Hakim"		0:32
3.	"Insan"	Nathan, Abdul Jalil Salleh, B. Nury	3:47
4.	"Masa"	KRU, B. Nury	3:10
5.	"Surah Al-Ankabut Ayat 45"		1:56
6.	"Solat Kita"	Yusri Yusoff, B. Nury	5:04
7.	"Iktibar"	Mohamad Asri, B. Nury	4:57
8.	"Hadis Qudsi"		0:42
9.	"Hidayah"	Zaid Yusof, Shah Haron, B. Nury	4:33
10.	"Zikir Kifarah"		3:22
11.	"Surah Al-Falaq"		1:59
12.	"Ingat 5 Sebelum 5"	Copyright Control, B. Nury	5:24
13.	"Ibu Mithali"	B. Nury	5:13
14.	"Surah Al A'La Ayat 16–17"		1:09
15.	"Terampun Dosa"	Yusri Yusof, B. Nury	4:23
16.	"Riwayat Bukhari Dan Muslim"		0:51
Total length:			50:00

== Release and reception ==
Pergi Tak Kembali was released in December 1999, with the title track serving as the lead single. A music video was produced to promote the song.

The album was well-received, selling over 50,000 copies. Writing for the New Straits Times, Zainal Alam Kadir described it as "the most upbeat nasyid album you can find in the market".

== Personnel ==
Credits adapted from Pergi Tak Kembali booklet liner notes.

- Rabbani – vocals, backing vocals
- Mohamad Asri - lead vocals, composer
- B. Nury – producer, lyrics
- KRU – composer, arranger, producer
- Zaid Yusof – producer, composer
- Yusri Yusoff – producer, composer
- Nathan – composer
- Abdul Jalil Salleh – composer
- Executive producer – Permata Audio / EMI Music Malaysia

== Charts ==
Chart (1999-2000)	Peak position
Malaysian Albums Chart	5

== Release history ==
Region	Release date	Format	Label
Malaysia	December 1999	CD, Digital download	Permata Audio, EMI Music Malaysia
