= Muhammad Ali Aman =

Politician from Singapore

Muhammad Ali Aman is former member of the Singapore Malay National Organisation, which is also known as Pertubuhan Kebangsaan Melayu Singapura (PKMS), a major political party in Singapore. He is also the former vice-chairman of Singapore Democratic Alliance, a political alliance of four political parties. He was the former President that involved in youth work through Motivasi Youth Association, a group for Malay youths. A graduate with a degree in Computer and Information Science from the University of Technology, Malaysia, Aman is an executive director of an estate management firm.

Aman was a former unionist and had served as branch chairman of the 40,000 member United Workers of Electronic and Electrical Industries. In December 2002, he was dismissed from this post after he refused a union directive to renounce his membership of SDA. The union is affiliated with the National Trades Union Congress.
