= Nauman Aman =

Pakistani cricketer (born 1983)

Personal information
- Born: 9 November 1983 (age 43); Rawalpindi, Pakistan
- Source: Cricinfo, 8 November 2015

Nauman Aman (born 9 November 1983) is a Pakistani first-class cricketer who played for Rawalpindi cricket team.
