= Muhammad Ya Habibi =

Compilation album by: Rabbani; Harakat Madani
- Released: July 6, 1998
- Recorded: 1998
- Studio: Orchid Studio, Cheras, Kuala Lumpur
- Genre: Nasheed; Contemporary
- Length: 64:20
- Label: Permata Audio; EMI Music Malaysia
- Producer: Sokhibul Fadhil Sabikin

Rabbani chronology
Arah (1998)	Muhammad Ya Habibi (1998)	Ramadhan Remix (1998)

Singles from Muhammad Ya Habibi
- 1. "Muhammad Ya Habibi" Released: 1998

Muhammad Ya Habibi (My Beloved Muhammad) is a compilation album by Malaysian nasheed groups Rabbani and Harakat Madani. It was released on 6 July 1998 by Permata Audio and EMI Music Malaysia in conjunction with the celebration of Maulidur Rasul. It also includes a track performed by Yusuf Islam.

== Background and production ==
Muhammad Ya Habibi is an album honoring the Prophet Muhammad S.A.W. It marked the first collaboration between nasheed groups Harakat Madani and Rabbani, alongside international singer Yusuf Islam. The album presents reinterpretations of classical songs of praise and salawat in a contemporary nasheed style, which later influenced Rabbani's subsequent releases. The tracks are performed in both Arabic and Malay.

The album was recorded at Orchid Studio in Cheras, Kuala Lumpur, and produced by Sokhibul Fadhil Sabikin. It contains 16 tracks: Rabbani performs ten tracks, Harakat Madani performs four tracks, the two groups collaborate on one track, and Yusuf Islam recorded a new rendition of "Talaʽ al-Badru ʽAlayna".

The title track, "Muhammad Ya Habibi", was arranged and produced by Zaid Yusoff. It later served as a musical reference for KRU when composing and producing the song "Pergi Tak Kembali".The album was accompanied by a color booklet containing lyrics, Malay translations of the salawat, and short stories about the life of the Prophet Muhammad.

== Track listing ==
All songs are copyright controlled except where noted.

No.	Title	Writer(s)	Original album	Length
1.	"Muhammad Ya Habibi" (Rabbani)		N/A	5:24
2.	"Thala' Al Badrul Alayna" (Yusuf Islam)		The Life of the Last Prophet	5:23
3.	"Nur Selawat" (Harakat Madani)	Copyright Control; Sokhibul Fadil	N/A	4:38
4.	"Surah Al Ahzab Ayat 56" (Rabbani)		N/A	1:39
5.	"Selawat Nabi" (Rabbani)	Asri Ibrahim; Nazim Mohamed	Arah	4:28
6.	"Muhammad Al Amin S.A.W" (Harakat Madani)		N/A	4:42
7.	"Sollallah Ala Yassin" (Rabbani)		Arah	4:26
8.	"Selawat As Syifaa" (Rabbani)		N/A	0:38
9.	"Keagungan Rasul S.A.W" (feat. Rabbani & Harakat Madani)	Asri Ibrahim; Sokhibul Fadil	N/A	4:30
10.	"Solla' Alaikallah" (Rabbani)		Rabbani	5:40
11.	"Panduan Bermaulid" (Rabbani)	Copyright Control; Asri Ibrahim; Sokhibul Fadil	N/A	5:09
12.	"Selawat Ibrahimiah" (Rabbani)		N/A	0:45
13.	"Solla' Alaikallah" (Harakat Madani)		N/A	6:05
14.	"Thala' Al Badrul Alayna" (Rabbani)		Rabbani	5:06
15.	"Selawat An Nur" (Rabbani)		N/A	0:39
16.	"Ya Rasullullah S.A.W" (Harakat Madani)	Abd Halim bin Awang Ibrahim	N/A	5:08
Total length:				64:20

== Certifications ==
Region	Certification	Certified units/sales
Malaysia	Platinum	50,000

== Release and reception ==
Muhammad Ya Habibi was released on 6 July 1998. The title track served as the album's lead single, and a music video was produced to promote it.

Zainal Alam Kadir of the New Straits Times described the album as "a good compilation," noting that "the direction is clear and the songs work as a collection," and that "Rabbani, Harakat Madani and Yusuf Islam perform well," with the Arabic tracks being "well delivered."

== Personnel ==
Credits adapted from the album liner notes.

- Rabbani – vocals
- Harakat Madani – vocals
- Yusuf Islam – vocals
- Sokhibul Fadhil Sabikin – lyricist, producer
- Mohd. Zaid Yusoff – arranger
- Asri Ibrahim – composer
- Nazim Mohamed – lyricist
- Abd Halim bin Awang Ibrahim – composer, lyricist

== Release history ==
Region	Release date	Format	Label
Malaysia	6 July 1998	CD, Digital download	Permata Audio; EMI Music Malaysia
