= Arah (album) =

Studio album by Rabbani
- Released: February 24, 1998
- Recorded: 1998
- Studio: Bumble Bee Studios
- Genre: Nasheed
- Length: 53:16
- Labels: Permata Audio; EMI Music Malaysia
- Producer: Sohibul Fadil Hj. Sabikin

Rabbani chronology
Rabbani (1997)	Arah (1998)	Muhammad Ya Habibi (1998)

Singles from Arah Dari Mana ... Ke Mana
- 1. "Anak Soleh" Released: 1998; 2. "Solla 'ala Yassin" Released: 1998

Arah Dari Mana ... Ke Mana (From Where … To Where) is the second studio album by Malaysian nasheed group Rabbani. It was released on 24 February 1998 by Permata Audio and EMI Music Malaysia.

== Background ==
Arah Dari Mana ... Ke Mana was Rabbani's second studio album, produced following the massive success of their self-titled debut album. The album was produced by Sohibul Fadil Hj. Sabikin and recorded at Bumble Bee Studios. Songwriting was handled by Asri Ibrahim, Nazim Mohamed, Mohd Asri Ubaidullah, Zanatul Syuhaida, Sokhibul Fadil, Abu Mahdun, and Shamsul Bahrine. Through this album, Rabbani aims to provide life guidance and promote spiritual growth for listeners.

== Track listing ==
No.	Title	Writer(s)	Length
1.	"Doa Pujian"	Copyright Control	4:25
2.	"Anak Soleh"	Asri Ibrahim; Nazim Mohamed	5:07
3.	"Selawat Nabi"	Asri Ibrahim; Nazim Mohamed	4:29
4.	"Bidadari"	Mohd Asri Ubaidullah; Zanatul Syuhaida	5:14
5.	"Kembara Cinta"	Asri Ibrahim; Sokhibul Fadil	5:00
6.	"Subhanallah"	Asri Ibrahim; Sokhibul Fadil; Abu Mahdun	5:20
7.	"Kebesaran Allah"	Asri Ibrahim; Sokhibul Fadil; Abu Mahdun	4:37
8.	"Epilog Budi"	Shamsul Bahrine	4:03
9.	"Adab Dan Sopan"	Mohd Asri Ubaidullah; Nazim Mohamed	4:38
10.	"Mensyukuri Nikmat"	Asri Ibrahim; Nazim Mohamed; Sokhibul Fadil	5:57
11.	"Solla 'ala Yassin"	Copyright Control	4:26
Total length:			53:16

== Release and reception ==
The album was released on 24 February 1998. It was well received upon release and sold over 50,000 copies, earning a Platinum certification in Malaysia.

== Personnel ==
Credits adapted from the album liner notes.

- Rabbani – vocals, vocal arrangement
- Asri Ibrahim – lead vocals, songwriter (tracks 2, 3, 5, 6, 7, 10)
- Sohibul Fadil Hj. Sabikin – music concept, arrangement, producer, songwriter (tracks 5, 6, 7)
- Mohd Arzmy – executive producer
- Mohd Asri Ubaidullah – songwriter (tracks 4, 9)
- Zanatul Syuhaida – songwriter (track 4)
- Nazim Mohamed – songwriter (tracks 2, 3, 9, 10)
- Abu Mahdun – songwriter (tracks 6, 7)
- Shamsul Bahrine – songwriter (track 8)
- Ikhmal Ali, Rina – A&R coordinator
- Erland Kok, Shafie Yusof – marketing
- Normahiran, Shima, Nawar, Jaja, Razman – promotion & advertising
- Anim Osman – artist management

== Certifications ==
Region	Certification	Certified units/sales
Malaysia	Platinum	50,000

== Release history ==
Region	Release date	Format	Label
Malaysia	24 February 1998	CD, digital download	Permata Audio, EMI Music Malaysia
