= Aman (Rabbani album) =

Studio album by Rabbani
- Released: November 2001
- Recorded: 2000–2001
- Genres: Nasheed; Contemporary
- Length: 57:17
- Labels: Permata Audio; EMI Music Malaysia
- Producers: Yusri Yusuf; KRU; LY; Mohamed Kamal Ali (Bong); Amin Abdullah; Sokhibul Fadil

Rabbani chronology
Intifada (2000)	Aman (2001)	Qiblat (2002)

Singles from Aman
- 1. "Aman" Released: 2001; 2. "Apa Yang Kau Tahu" Released: 2001; 3. "Kerlipan Cinta" Released: 2001

Aman (Peace) is the fifth studio album by Malaysian nasheed group Rabbani. It was released in November 2001 by Permata Audio and EMI Music Malaysia.

== Production ==
Aman was produced following the commercial success of the group’s previous album, Intifada. The album was heavily influenced by Intifada, with many of the same producers and composers involved in its production. It contains six Malay-language songs, four Arabic-language songs, as well as recitations of verses from the Qur'an and selected hadith.

In the album, Rabbani also recorded an Arabic-language version of "Pergi Tak Kembali", titled "Irtihal". Aman was the final studio album released by Rabbani under Permata Audio and EMI Music Malaysia, as the group's contract with the labels ended in March 2002.

== Track listing ==
No.	Title	Writer(s)	Length
1.	"Aman"	Yusri Yusuf; Mohd Affendy Razali	4:16
2.	"Apa Yang Kau Tahu"	Norman Abdul Halim; Yusry Abdul Halim; Edry Abdul Halim; Sokhibul Fadil	3:21
3.	"Surah Yunus"	Copyright Control	2:21
4.	"Kerlipan Cinta"	LY; Muhammad Ifwat	4:31
5.	"Surah Al-Baqarah"	Copyright Control	1:21
6.	"Suluh Budiman"	Mohamed Kamal Ali; Azam Dungun	5:36
7.	"Khairul Bariyah"	Copyright Control	6:06
8.	"Surah At-Taubah (ayat 128–129)"	Copyright Control	3:06
9.	"Siramilah Taman Nurani"	Mohamed Kamal Ali; Azam Dungun; Hamdan Mohd Noor	4:31
10.	"Hadith 1: Ilmu"	Copyright Control	0:35
11.	"Anta Ya Rahman"	Copyright Control	4:35
12.	"Hadith 2: Keredhaan Allah"	Copyright Control	0:35
13.	"Kaca Permata"	Amin Abdullah; Sokhibul Fadil	4:49
14.	"Surah Al-Qasas"	Copyright Control	2:03
15.	"Maulana"	Copyright Control	5:08
16.	"Hadith 3: Hijrah & Jihad"	Copyright Control	0:25
17.	"Irtihal" (Pergi Tak Kembali – Arabic version)	Norman Abdul Halim; Yusry Abdul Halim; Edry Abdul Halim; Sokhibul Fadil	3:58
Total length:			57:17

== Release and promotion ==
Aman was released in November 2001, with the title track serving as the lead single. Other singles from the album included "Apa Yang Kau Tahu" and "Kerlipan Cinta" , which were later made into music videos. Both videos were filmed at the Federal Territory Mosque, Kuala Lumpur, and featured computer-generated graphics.

In addition, for every album sold, one Malaysian ringgit was donated to non-governmental organizations assisting war victims in Afghanistan and Palestine.

In his review for Mudik, Nahar NRS praised Aman for its blend of contemporary nasyid and pop influences, although he noted that the album was slightly less impactful than Rabbani's previous release, Intifada.

== Personnel ==
Credits adapted from the album liner notes.

- Rabbani – vocals
- Yusri Yusuf – composer, producer
- KRU – composer, producer
- LY – songwriter, producer
- Mohamed Kamal Ali (Bong) – lyricist, songwriter, producer
- Amin Abdullah – songwriter, producer
- Sokhibul Fadil – songwriter, producer
- Azam Dungun – lyricist
- Hamdan Mohd Noor – lyricist
- Mohd Affendy Razali – songwriter

== Certifications ==
Region	Certification	Certified units/sales
Malaysia	Platinum	30,000

== Release history ==
Region	Release date	Format	Label
Malaysia	November 2001	CD, digital download	Permata Audio, EMI Music Malaysia
