= Epik (Rabbani album) =

Studio album by Rabbani
- Released: November 18, 2003
- Recorded: 2003
- Studio: KRU Studios
- Genres: Nasheed; Contemporary
- Length: 40:33
- Label: KRU Music Group
- Producers: Amaludin Syukri Nasution; Edry Abdul Halim; Raizan Zainal Abidin; Sohibul Fadil Hj. Sabikin

Rabbani chronology
Qiblat (2002)	Epik (2003)	Kenangan Lalu (2003)

Singles from Epik
- 1. "Subuh Yang Terakhir" Released: 2003

Epik (Epic) is the seventh studio album by Malaysian nasheed group Rabbani. It was released on 18 November 2003 by KRU Music Group.

== Production ==
The album was produced at KRU Studios in Kuala Lumpur by Amaludin Syukri Nasution, Edry Abdul Halim, Raizan Zainal Abidin, and Sohibul Fadil Hj. Sabikin. Songwriting was handled by Asri Ibrahim, Edry Abdul Halim, Sohibul Fadil Hj. Sabikin, Amaludin Syukri Nasution, Mohamad Asri Ubaidullah, and Fendy. Additionally, Raizan Zainal Abidin (Neves) of Pretty Ugly contributed two songs, "Janji" and "Maafkanlah," while Nine from Phyne Ballerz assisted with vocal arrangements. Edry Abdul Halim and Raizan Zainal Abidin also contributed to mixing and arranging the album. For this release, Rabbani adopted a more commercial pop style while maintaining their signature vocal harmonies.

== Release and reception ==
Epik was released on 18 November 2003, with "Subuh Yang Terakhir" as its first single. The album was nominated for Best Nasyid Album at the 11th Anugerah Industri Muzik and for Choice Nasyid Song at the 2004 Anugerah Era.

Zul Husni of Berita Harian praised Rabbani's willingness to experiment, noting that despite being known for aggressive rhythms, Epik introduced a more commercial pop-influenced nasyid style.

== Track listing ==
No.	Title	Writer(s)	Length
1.	"Hadith - Syukur"		0:22
2.	"Subuh Yang Terakhir"	Edry Abdul Halim	3:11
3.	"Bencilah Benci"	Amaludin Syukri Nasution; Mohamad Asri Ubaidullah	3:48
4.	"Surah Al-A'araf Ayat 144"		0:48
5.	"Epik"	Edry Abdul Halim	3:55
6.	"Surah Al-Haj Ayat 11"		1:01
7.	"Agung"	Edry Abdul Halim	3:09
8.	"Janji"	Raizan Zainal Abidin	3:56
9.	"Kaulah Segalanya"	Fendy; Sohibul Fadil	3:39
10.	"Hadith - Allah Tempat Berserah Diri"		0:28
11.	"Maafkanlah"	Raizan Zainal Abidin	4:01
12.	"Hadith - Ujian Adalah Peningkatan Taqwa"		0:21
13.	"Kemenangan"	Sohibul Fadil	4:14
14.	"Iltizam"	Sohibul Fadil	3:47
15.	"Intifada 1424"	Edry Abdul Halim; Sohibul Fadil	3:53
Total length:			40:33

== Personnel ==
Credits adapted from the album liner notes.

- Rabbani – vocals, vocal arrangement
- Asri Ibrahim – lead vocals, songwriter
- Edry Abdul Halim – songwriter, arranger, mixing, producer
- Sohibul Fadil Hj. Sabikin – songwriter, producer
- Raizan Zainal Abidin – songwriter, arranger, mixing, producer
- Amaludin Syukri Nasution – songwriter, producer
- Mohamad Asri Ubaidullah – songwriter
- Fendy – songwriter
- Archie – vocal arrangement, recording
- Zulkarnain – vocal arrangement
- Farizan Mohamad – graphic design
- Mohd Arzmy – A&R
- Warner Music Malaysia – distribution

== Release history ==
Region	Release date	Format	Label
Malaysia	18 November 2003	CD, digital download	KRU Music Group
