= Qiblat =

Studio album by Rabbani
- Released: November 26, 2002
- Recorded: 2002
- Studio: KRU Studios
- Genre: Nasheed; Contemporary
- Length: 49:14
- Label: KRU Music Group
- Producer: Amaludin Syukri Nasution; Edry Abdul Halim; Sohibul Fadil Hj. Sabikin

Rabbani chronology
Aman (2001)	Qiblat (2002)	Epik (2003)

Singles from Qiblat
- 1. "Satu Qiblat Yang Sama" Released: 2002; 2. "Pengantin Baru" Released: 2003; 3. "Setanggi Kasih" Released: 2003; 4. "Handzalah" Released: 2003

Qiblat (Qibla) is the sixth studio album by Malaysian nasheed group Rabbani. It was released on 26 November 2002 by KRU Music Group.

== Production ==
After releasing eight albums with Permata Audio and EMI Music Malaysia, Rabbani decided not to renew their contract with their former record label upon its expiration in March 2002. They then signed with KRU Music Group on 22 August 2002 and began working on what would become Qiblat later that year.

The album was produced by Amaludin Syukri Nasution (Archie), Edry Abdul Halim, and Ustaz Sohibul Hj. Sabikin, and was recorded at KRU Studios in Kuala Lumpur. The album combines hints of ethnic Malay, Arabic, and Hindi music (e.g., conga, tabla, bongo, maracas, jimbe, and kompang) with programmed music. Qiblat also incorporates five hadiths and surahs from the al-Quran between the ten tracks as a prelude to each song. Songwriting was handled by Asri Ibrahim, Edry Abdul Halim, Sohibul Fadil Hj. Sabikin, Mohamad Asri Ubaidullah, Yusri Yusof, Syed Mohammad, Pahrol Md. Juoi, and Hasnol Hadi.

== Release and reception ==
Qiblat was released on 26 November 2002. The first single from the album was "Satu Qiblat Yang Sama", and its music video was filmed in Mecca, Saudi Arabia. In April 2003, an MTV Karaoke VCD was released, featuring music videos for all the songs from the album, along with hadith verses.

In his review, Nahar ARS praised its vocals, arrangements, and inclusion of hadith but felt its concept and lead single “Satu Qiblat Yang Sama” were less impactful than their earlier works.

== Track listing ==
No.	Title	Writer(s)	Length
1.	"Satu Qiblat Yang Sama"	Edry Abdul Halim	4:15
2.	"Pahlawan Agama"	Asri Ibrahim	5:00
3.	"Hadith - Kelebihan Perkahwinan"		0:39
4.	"Pengantin Baru"	Safwan Abd Rahman; Mohamad Asri Ubaidullah	3:56
5.	"Hadith - Amalan Dikasihi Allah"		1:28
6.	"Handzalah"	Yusri Yusof; Sohibul Fadil	4:51
7.	"Hadith - Derhaka"		0:41
8.	"Anugerah"	Syed Mohammad; Pahrol Md. Juoi	4:47
9.	"Setanggi Kasih"	Edry Abdul Halim; Pahrol Md. Juoi	4:24
10.	"Hadith - Kekayaan Sebenar"		0:32
11.	"Cita-Cita dan Cinta"	Syed Mohammad; Pahrol Md. Juoi	3:54
12.	"Hadith - Balasan Tiap Amalan"		1:29
13.	"Kalimah"	Syed Mohammad	3:39
14.	"Impian Hamba"	Sohibul Fadil	4:55
15.	"Hadith - Orang Bijak"		0:38
16.	"Musafir Kelana"	Hasnol Hadi	4:06
Total length:			49:14

== Accolades ==
Award(s)	Year	Recipient(s)	Nominated work(s)	Category	Result	Ref
Anugerah Industri Muzik	2003	Rabbani	Qiblat	Album of the Year	Nominated	
Anugerah Industri Muzik	2003	Rabbani	Qiblat	Best Nasyid Album	Won	
Anugerah Era	2003	Rabbani	Satu Qiblat Yang Sama	Choice Nasyid Song	Nominated	
Anugerah Carta Nasyid IKIM.fm	2004	Rabbani	Handzalah	First Place	Won	

== Personnel ==
Credits adapted from the album liner notes.

- Rabbani – vocals, vocal arrangement
- Asri Ibrahim – lead vocal, composer, lyricist
- Edry Abdul Halim – composer, arranger, producer, engineer, keyboards
- Amaludin Syukri Nasution – producer, arranger, keyboards, recording engineer
- Sohibul Fadil Hj. Sabikin – lyricist, producer
- Raizan Zainal Abidin – co-producer, engineer, recording engineer
- Mohamad Asri Ubaidullah – composer, lyricist
- Yusri Yusof – composer, arranger, keyboards
- Syed Mohammad – composer, lyricist
- Pahrol Md. Juoi – composer, lyricist
- Hasnol Hadi – composer
- Anuar Dahalan – arranger
- Ara Antranik – percussion
- Shah – percussion
- Is – keyboard
- Fendy – recording engineer
- Emil Edry – graphic design

== Release history ==
Region	Release date	Format	Label
Malaysia	26 November 2002	CD, digital download	KRU Music Group
