= Amtmann =

Historical profession in German-speaking countries

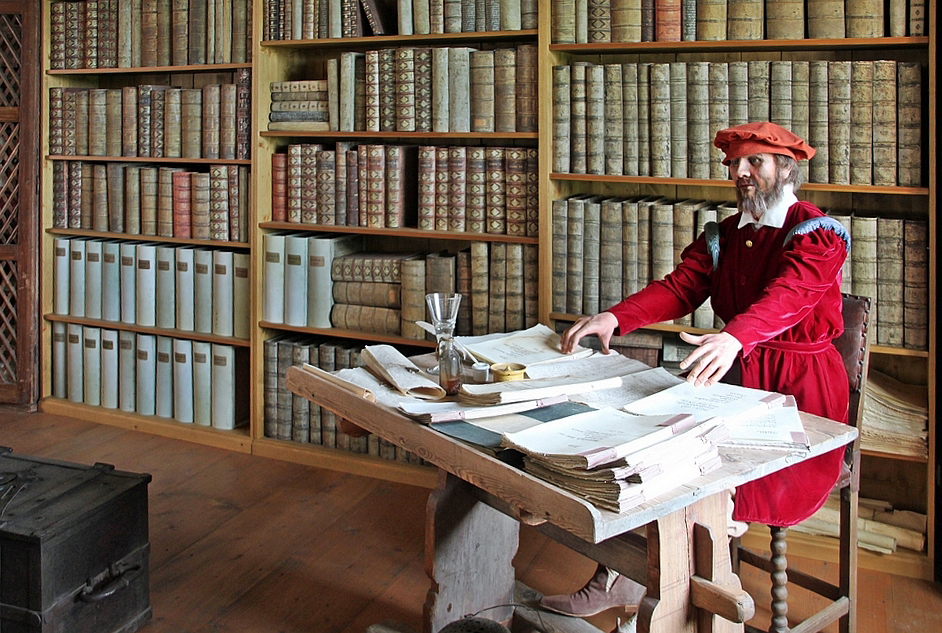
An Amtmann in his office or Amtsstube. Reconstruction at Mildenstein Castle (administrative seat in the Amt of Leisnig)

The Amtmann, Amtmand (in Denmark) or Ammann (in Switzerland) was an official in German-speaking countries of Europe and in some of the Nordic countries from the time of the Middle Ages whose office was akin to that of a bailiff. He was the most senior retainer (Dienstmann) of an Amt; the administrative office of a territorial lord (Landesherr) created to manage the estates of manors (Gutshöfe), castles and villages. The estates were both administrative as well as juridical districts. The Amtmann was usually a member of the nobility or a cleric. In towns, he was also often a member of the wealthy classes amongst the citizenship. He resided in an Amthaus or Amtshaus and collected taxes from the district (Amtsbezirk), administered justice and maintained law and order with a small, armed unit.

Later, the word Beamter superseded the older word Amtmann and has come to mean "official" or "civil servant". The word Amtmann is derived from ambet-ambachtos - "one sent round", Celtic: Latin ambactus "envoy", "herold", "servant", French, ambassadeur, "ambassador". By contrast, the Icelandic word ambátt, "female slave" and the Norwegian ambått "room maid", "maiden", emerged from the Celtic-Latin via Old German/Old Nordic.

In Holstein during the Danish era (to 1864) the Amtmann was the senior official of a sovereign department (landesherrliches Amt). As head of the administration he was subordinate from 1546 to the ministry (German Chancellery) in Copenhagen. The Amtmann was also a secular judge of the trial court (erster Instanz) and, together with the Propst or provost, made up the ecclesiastical court or consistory (Konsistorium). In a literary testimony to the office, Detlev von Liliencron wrote a ballad called "Pidder Lüng" in which there is an Amtmann of Tønder, called Henning Pogwisch.

In Switzerland the Ammann (Amtmann) was an office, since the Middle Ages, elected by the citizens who was the leader of the executive of a canton (Landammann), a town (Stadtammann) or a parish (Gemeindeammann).

== Switzerland ==
The Ammann was an official who served lords or kings in Switzerland from the early Middle Ages onwards. The form and meaning of the term varied according to region and period. The position evolved from a representative of feudal lords to a representative of local communities, playing a crucial role in the development of Swiss municipal governance.

From the beginning of the Middle Ages, the Ammann occupied a function in the service of a lord or king. On Swiss territory, from the mid-13th century onwards, the Amman collected census and other dues on behalf of landlords. In cities, he was responsible for market peace or protected convents. Increasingly, he exercised low justice on behalf of the bailiff. He was sometimes in competition with the Meier and the Cellerar, who were powerful through their hereditary offices; sometimes he also served as their replacement.

When municipalities began to have power, particularly judicial power, the Ammann, who was most often a native and therefore integrated into the population, saw his function transform: this representative of the landlord gradually became, in the 13th and 14th centuries, that of local communities (at first he assumed both roles). At the same time, in many regions, both in towns and in the countryside, subjects acquired the right to elect the Ammann or to propose candidates to the authorities.

The Landsgemeinde, which developed in rural regions, particularly in Uri, Schwyz, Glarus, Zug, Obwalden, Nidwalden and in both Appenzell Innerrhoden and Appenzell Ausserrhoden, have their origin in the judicial assemblies that the Ammann directed. Depending on the location, the Ammann took the title of Landammann, town Ammann, municipal Ammann or valley Ammann (Stadtammann, Gemeindeammann, Talammann); his function made him most often the head of the executive.

== Official use today ==
Today in Germany, an Amtmann is the official title for an official (Beamter) of pay band (Besoldungsordnung) A 11 in the "upper service" level (gehobener Dienst) of the German Civil Service, corresponding to an Army Captain.

In the Austrian state of Burgenland, Amtmann is the title of a municipal official.

The feminine form, Amtfrau (e.g. Regierungsamtfrau - RAmtfr - or Zollamtfrau - ZAF) has become widely accepted. For a time the word Amtmännin was also used instead of Amtfrau. This term was formerly the norm in several German states and the federal administration. It has however largely disappeared, albeit in the Federal Customs Administration the title Zollamtmännin (an alternative to Zollamtfrau) has been chosen. Originally the introduction of official titles such as Justizamtfrau was started in the 1970s by a Lower Saxon female official/law enforcement officer who refused her posting order as long as it was not made out in the feminine form. In Switzerland, a female Landammann is usually titled and referred to as Frau Landammann.

== Bibliography ==
- Schweizerisches Idiotikon, Volume 4, pp. 246–251
- Durrer, R. "Die Einheit Unterwaldens", in Jahrbuch für Schweizerische Geschichte, 35, 1910, pp. 1–356
- Benz, A.R. Der Landammann in den urschweizerischen Demokratien, 1918
- Blickle, P. "Friede und Verfassung", in Innerschweiz und frühe Eidgenossenschaft, 1, 1990, pp. 32–33

== See also ==
- Amman (disambiguation)
- Ammann (disambiguation)
- Bezirksamtmann

== General and cited references ==
- Hans-Cord Sarnighausen: "Die alten Amtschreiber und Amtmänner", in: Zeitschrift für Niederdeutsche Familienkunde, Issue 4/2000, pp. 147–152.
