= Reinhold Aman =

German chemist and maledictologist (1936–2019)

- Reinhold Aman, giving the finger
- Born: April 8, 1936; Fürstenzell, Germany
- Died: March 2, 2019 (aged 82)

Academic background
- Education: University of Wisconsin-Madison; University of Texas

Reinhold Aman (April 8, 1936 – March 2, 2019) was a chemical engineer and professor of German before achieving national and even international recognition as the publisher of Maledicta, a scholarly journal dedicated to the study of offensive language, also known as maledictology.

== Career ==
Aman was born in Fürstenzell near Passau, Bavaria. He studied chemical engineering in Augsburg and later worked as a chemical analyst and petroleum chemist in Frankfurt, Munich, and Montreal prior to working as a translator and clerk for the U.S. Army in Frankfurt. He moved to Milwaukee in 1959, initially working there as a metallurgist and analytical chemist.

Aman earned a bachelor's degree in German and secondary education at the University of Wisconsin–Milwaukee in 1965, and he completed a Ph.D. in German at the University of Texas in 1968 with a dissertation on "Der Kampf in Wolframs Parzival" ("Combat in Wolfram's Parzival"). During his university years he taught German, French, Spanish, and English at various high schools, usually on a part-time basis. In his final year at Texas, he also served as a teaching assistant and teaching associate.

Aman was hired in 1968 as an assistant professor of German at the University of Wisconsin–Milwaukee where he taught undergraduate and graduate level courses in German, philology, and medieval literature and in 1971 started Laugh and Learn, a magazine of humorous material for second language learners. Denied tenure in 1974, he held that he had been terminated out of "pure professional jealousy". He subsequently began publishing Maledicta from his home.

Apart from Maledicta, Aman published a Bayrisch-Österreichisches Schimpfwörterbuch ("Bavarian-Austrian Curse Dictionary") (ISBN 3-86520-095-8) and shorter monographs as well as various books, including Hillary Clinton's Pen Pal: A Guide to Life and Lingo in Federal Prisons (ISBN 0-916500-14-4) (1996). At the time, Clinton was experiencing legal difficulties, and Aman claimed he wanted to make use of his recent term in federal prison to inform her about prison customs and argot so that she could avoid potentially lethal faux pas.

In 1983, Aman published a book of sex puns called How Do They Do It? A Collection of Wordplays Revealing the Sexual Proclivities of Man and Beast.

From the late 1990s until 2004, he was very active in online discussion fora.

He appears in the 2005 documentary Fuck, in which he is described as "a cunning linguist".

== Personal life, prison term, and final years ==
In 1993, following a bitter divorce from his wife Shirley Aman, Aman was convicted on three counts of mailing threatening communications and sentenced to 27 months in federal prison for sending numerous Wisconsin lawyers and judges accounts of how he believed they should be shot, as well as for sending two postcards to his ex-wife with pasted-on headlines of news articles about women killed by their former husbands. The sentence was reduced to 18 months on appeal; he served 15 1/2 months at Santa Rita, Terminal Island, Lompoc, and Dublin (now a Federal prison for women only). He was released in February 1995, whereupon he resumed the publication of Maledicta, with the assistance of readers and friends plus the use of some of his retirement savings.

When Maledicta 13 appeared in 2005, Aman had become ill and was in debt. Evicted from his home in Santa Rosa, California, he devoted much of his time to caring for stray and feral cats. He died on March 2, 2019, aged 82.
