= Mohammad Aman =

Afghan banker and politician

Dr Mohammad Aman
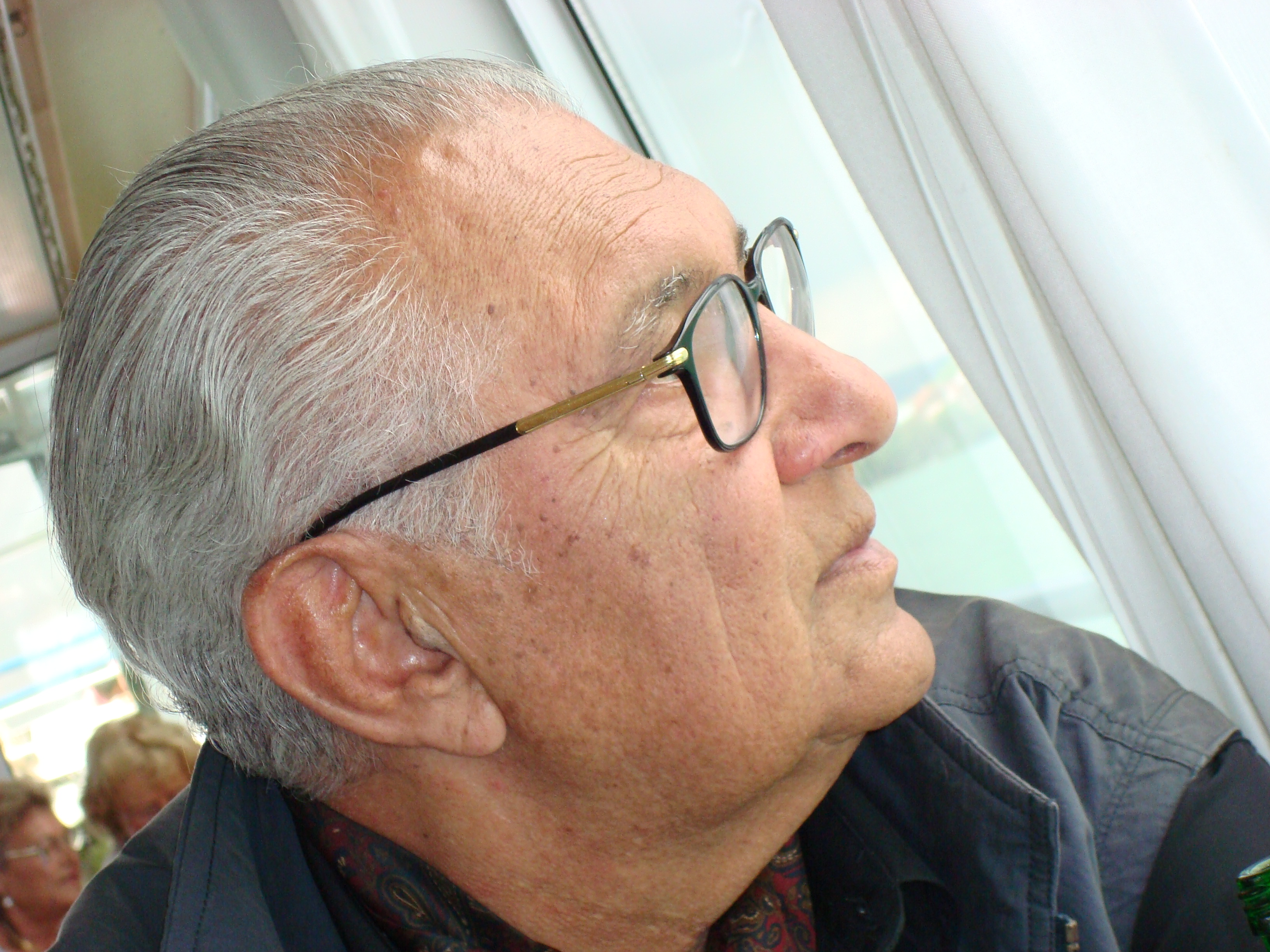
- Aman in Zurich
- Born: May 4, 1929 (age 97); Kabul, Kingdom of Afghanistan
- Died: Zurich, Switzerland
- Education: University of Zurich.
- Occupation: Finance Minister of Afghanistan from 1969 to 1971
- Known for: Afghanistan's Minister of Finance (1969–72)

Mohammad Aman (born May 1929) is an Afghan banker and politician.

== Early life ==
Aman was born in Kabul, Afghanistan on 4 May 1929, an only child. He attended Nejat High School (now known as Amani High School) from 1936 – 1948. In 1949, he was the recipient of a government scholarship for further studies in Zurich, Switzerland. He completed his studies with a PhD from the University of Zurich. His PhD dissertation was on German credit policy after World War II.

== Career ==
Upon returning to Afghanistan in 1959, Aman commenced employment in the Treasury Department of the Ministry of Finance.

In 1962, Aman was appointed first Vice President of the Central Bank of Afghanistan (also known as Da Afghanistan Bank).

In 1967, Aman was elected Chairman of the sponsoring committee for the establishment of the Industrial Development Bank of Afghanistan which was established in 1973. From 1969 until 1971, he was also the Minister of Finance in Afghanistan, in the Cabinet of Noor Ahmad Etemadi.

From 1972 to 1974, Aman was the Chairman/President of Afghan Trading Company, based in London, United Kingdom.

Since retirement, Dr. Aman resides in Zurich, Switzerland.
