= Rabbani (album) =

Studio album by Rabbani
- Released: May 22, 1997
- Recorded: 1997
- Studio: Permata Studio
- Genre: Nasheed
- Length: 65:41
- Labels: Permata Audio; EMI Music Malaysia
- Producer: Sohibul Fadil Hj. Sabikin

Rabbani chronology
Rabbani (1997)	Arah (1998)

Singles from Rabbani
- 1. "Assalamualaikum" Released: 1997

Rabbani (Devine) is the debut studio album by Malaysian nasheed group Rabbani. It was released on 22 May 1997 by Permata Audio and EMI Music Malaysia.

== Background and production ==
On 1 March 1997, Rabbani was formed by Permata Audio, a nasheed music production company based in Kuala Lumpur. The group consisted of one lead singer, six backing vocalists, and six musicians. Besides performing nasheed, most of the members were full-time employees at Permata Audio, serving in roles such as marketing, administration, event management, studio coordination, and music production. They later signed a record deal with EMI Music Malaysia.

Their self-titled album was recorded at Permata Studio in Kuala Lumpur and produced by Sohibul Fadil Hj. Sabikin. For their debut, Rabbani focused on classical nasheed, reviving traditional Islamic songs while also including original compositions by the group. The album featured 14 tracks and incorporated influences from Middle Eastern and Central African rhythms. Its lyrical themes centred on devotion to God and the teachings of Islam.

Group leader Asri Ibrahim stated that the group's strength lay in presenting their music live with a full band, aiming to replicate the studio sound in their performances. The album included new versions of P. Ramlee's "Alhamdulillah" and "Berkorban Apa Saja". Rabbani also re-recorded an earlier song from their time with Nada Murni for the album.

== Track listing ==
No.	Title	Writer(s)	Length
1.	"Assalamualaikum"	Hj. Akhmudi	4:30
2.	"Ma'rifatullah"	Mohd Nawawi Ibrahim	4:20
3.	"Berkorban Apa Saja"	P.Ramlee; Jamil Sulong	3:22
4.	"Thola'al Badru"	Copyright Control	5:08
5.	"Munajat"	Aminuddin Sani; Mohd Nawawi Ibrahim	5:58
6.	"Bada'na"	Copyright Control	3:46
7.	"Kasih Sayang"	Asri Ibrahim	5:23
8.	"Siratullah"	Asri Ibrahim; Mohd Asri Ubaidullah	4:59
9.	"Nur Di Hati"	Asri Ibrahim; Mohd Asri Ubaidullah	4:46
10.	"Alhamdulillah"	P.Ramlee; S.Sudarmaji	3:47
11.	"Kisah Kaabah"	Haron Omar; Mohd Radzi	5:29
12.	"Solla'Alaikallah"	Copyright Control	5:41
13.	"Wawasan Hijrah"	Asri Ibrahim; Sokhibul Fadil	3:32
14.	"Adikku Sayang"	Yusuf Sabri; Mohd. Sofwan Abd. Rahman	5:00
Total length:			65:41

== Release and reception ==
The album was released on 22 May 1997. It was well received upon release and sold over 30,000 copies in 2 weeks. As of 1998, the album sold over 90,000 copies.

Writing for The Straits Times, Junaidah Dahlan described the album as "more classical, less catchy and more serious-sounding," praising Asri Ibrahim's vocals and the group's harmonies.

== Personnel ==
Credits adapted from the album liner notes.

- Rabbani – vocals, vocal arrangement
- Asri Ibrahim – lead vocals, songwriter (tracks 7, 8, 9, 13)
- Sohibul Fadil Hj. Sabikin – music concept, arrangement, producer, songwriter (track 13)
- Mohd Arzmy – executive producers
- Nizam – arrangement, musician
- Hamzah, Omar, Zulkifli – musicians
- Hj. Akhmudi – songwriter (track 1)
- Mohd Nawawi Ibrahim – songwriter (tracks 2, 5)
- Aminuddin Sani – songwriter (track 5)
- P. Ramlee – songwriter (tracks 3, 10)
- Jamil Sulong – songwriter (track 3)
- S. Sudarmaji – songwriter (track 10)
- Haron Omar – songwriter (track 11)
- Mohd Radzi – songwriter (track 11)
- Yusuf Sabri – songwriter (track 14)
- Mohd Sofwan Abd. Rahman – songwriter (track 14)
- Mohd Asri Ubaidullah – coordinators, songwriter (tracks 8, 9)
- Azmi Ali – coordinators
- Permata Studio – recording studio
- Permata Studio technicians – recording engineers
- Shahnazron, Permata Studio technicians – mixing engineers
- Black Genesis Mastering Lab – mastering and editing
- Tapa (DEXS), Nizam (DEXS) – concept and design
- M. Naim Hj. Husain – calligraphy
- Zen – photography
- Mas Omar, Kit, Shima, Asim, Anwar – production management
- Khairyl Yassin – marketing
- Performance & Artist Management Department, Permata Audio – management

== Certifications ==
Region	Certification	Certified units/sales
Malaysia	Platinum	90,000

== Release history ==
Region	Release date	Format	Label
Malaysia	22 May 1997	CD, digital download	Permata Audio, EMI Music Malaysia
