= KRU discography =

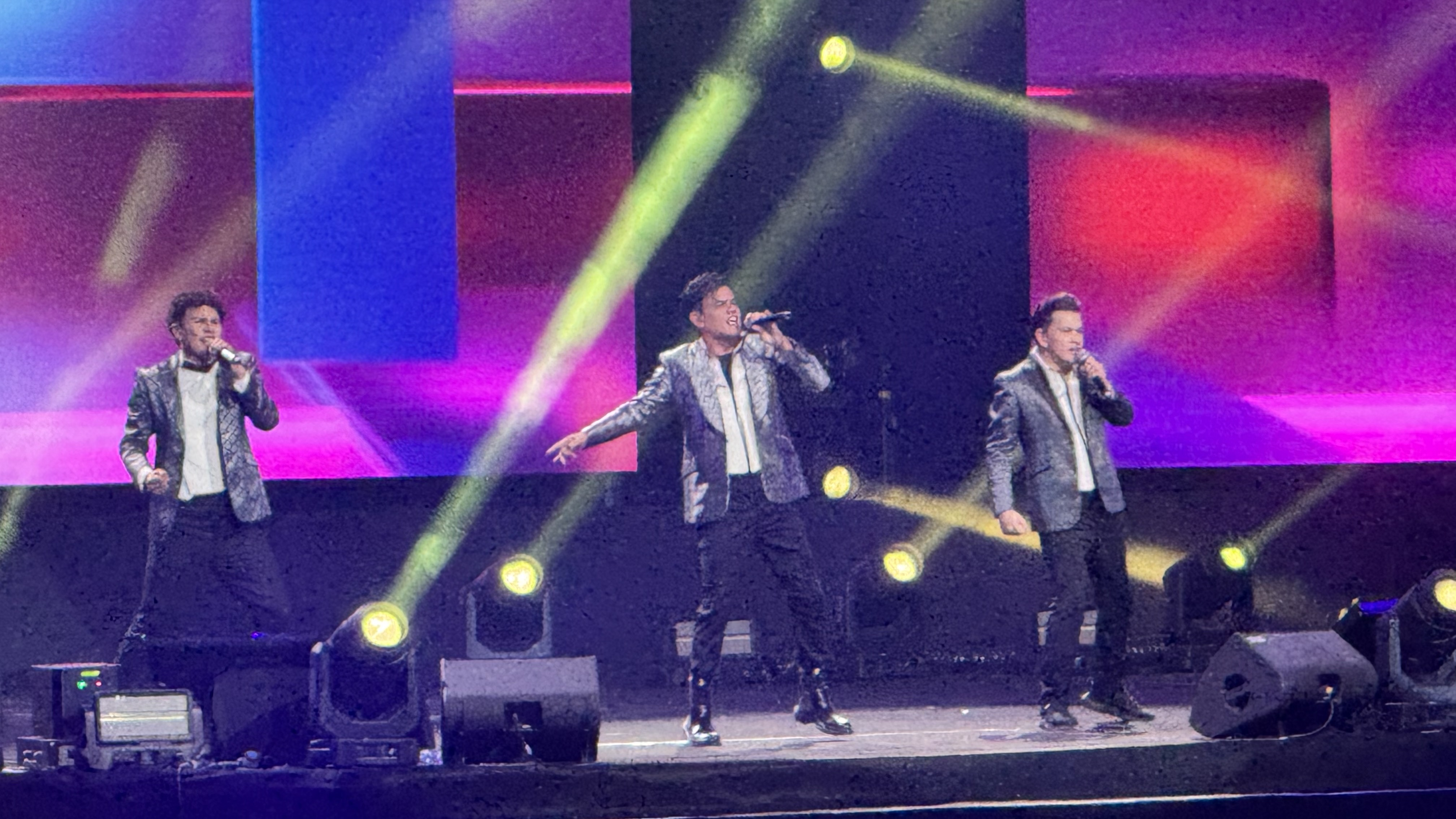
- KRU performing in 2025
- Studio albums: 14
- EPs: 1
- Compilation albums: 10
- Tribute albums: 2
- Singles: 70
- Promotional singles: 7
- Music videos: 30
- Soundtrack albums: 3

Throughout their career, Malaysian boy band KRU released 14 studio albums, 10 compilation albums, three soundtrack albums, two tribute albums, an extended play, 70 singles and seven promotional singles. They also recorded the soundtrack to three feature films, acted in two and released 30 music videos.

KRU was established in 1992, consisting of brothers Norman, Yusry and Edry Abdul Halim. After signing with EMI Music Malaysia, KRU released their debut album Canggih in 1992 and sold over 70,000 copies. However, Radio Televisyen Malaysia (RTM) filed a complaint about the album's content, which was said to be promoting yellow culture and banned 9 songs from its radio airplay. The KRU brothers then released their second album, reKRUed (1993), which sold well. Their next album, Awas!, which was released as an extended play (EP), become a critical and commercial success. In 1996, KRU released their fifth album, Ooh! La! La!, which was well received and sold over 150,000 copies and being certified multi-platinum. Most of their songs in the album were used as a soundtrack for the 1996 Malaysian romantic drama film, Cinta Metropolitan. After having recorded English tracks in their previous albums, KRU released their debut and only English-languaged album, The Way We Jam (1998), which also sold well. The album, which they collaborated with Diane Warren, David Foster and Babyface, won the 6th Anugerah Industri Muzik for the Best Engineered Album while its lead single of the same name won the Best Music Video. Their subsequent album, Formula Luarbiasa (1999), also become critical and commercial success.

In 2000, KRU created Tyco, which was received recognition from the Malaysia Book of Records as the Malaysia's First Virtual Artiste, with members consisted of a 3D animated versions of the brothers. Their only studio album of the same name and KRU's eighth studio album overall, was released in January 2001, with singles like "Bidadari" and "With U" become hits. The KRU brothers celebrates 10th anniversary of their music career and released their ninth album, KRUjaan (2002), which also well received. This was followed by their subsequent album, Empayar KRUjaan V2.0, in which they included three new songs including a cover version of Malaysian rock band Revolver's "Perpisahan" and Sudirman Arshad's "Terasing", which they re-recorded as "Perpisahan Terasing". Yusry, one of the KRU brothers, released his debut and only self-titled solo album in 2003, making him the only KRU brothers to have a solo album. Between 2005 and 2006, the brothers released their eleventh album, KRUnisme with all songs composed and written by Edry, including lead single "Terhangat di Pasaran" featuring Sabahan singer, Adam Mat Saman and a cover version of Anita Sarawak's "Seksis", which they re-recorded as "Seksa"; and twelfth album, 10 di Skala Richter, which included three singles. Both albums also was well received.

KRU released their thirteenth and last album with EMI Music Malaysia, KRUnomena in 2013 and become their first studio album in seven years since 10 di Skala Richter, marking the longest gap between studio albums in KRU's career. In 2018, KRU decided to breakup after 25 years being active in music industry and released their last single, "Tahan Lama" featuring Joe Flizzow. However, they reformed in 2024 for yet another new album, Kaset, which become their first studio album in 12 years since KRUnomena and their first album after signed with Sony Music Malaysia. The first compilation of KRU's works, KRUmania, was released in 1997; this was followed by several more during the 2000s and 2010s. They also released a tribute album for the Selangor national football team titled Viva Selangor in collaboration with the Selangor State Government and for Malaysian rock singer, Ella titled Urban Strike.

== Albums ==
=== Studio albums ===
List of studio albums, with sales figures and certifications
Title	Album details	Sales	Certifications	Ref(s)
Canggih	Released: 5 October 1992; Label: EMI Music Malaysia; Formats: CD, cassette, digital download	70,000	Platinum	
reKRUed	Released: October 1993; Label: EMI Music Malaysia; Formats: CD, cassette, digital download	60,000	Platinum	
Ooh! La! La!	Released: 19 March 1996; Label: EMI Music Malaysia; Formats: CD, cassette, digital download	150,000	Multi-Platinum	
The Way We Jam	Released: 26 November 1998; Label: EMI Music Malaysia; Formats: CD, cassette, digital download	–	–	
Formula Luarbiasa	Released: 16 December 1999; Label: EMI Music Malaysia; Formats: CD, cassette, digital download	30,000	Platinum	
KRUjaan	Released: 16 May 2002; Label: EMI Music Malaysia; Formats: CD, cassette, digital download	–	–	
Empayar KRUjaan V2.0	Released: 26 October 2002; Label: EMI Music Malaysia; Formats: CD, cassette, digital download	–	–	
KRUnisme	Released: 1 January 2005; Label: EMI Music Malaysia; Formats: CD, cassette, digital download	–	–	
10 di Skala Richter	Released: July 2006; Label: EMI Music Malaysia; Formats: CD, cassette, digital download	–	–	
KRUnomena	Released: 31 January 2013; Label: KRU Music; Formats: CD, cassette, digital download	–	–	
Kaset	Released: 25 April 2025; Label: KRU Music, Sony Music Malaysia; Formats: CD, cassette, digital download	–	–	
" – " denotes no certification or sales information available.

=== Soundtrack albums ===
List of soundtrack albums
Title	Album details	Ref(s)
Awas! da' Soundtrack	Released: 15 June 1995; Label: EMI Music Malaysia; Formats: CD, cassette, digital download	
Cinta Metropolitan OST	Released: September 1996; Label: EMI Music Malaysia; Formats: CD, cassette, digital download	
Silat Legenda OST	Released: August 1998; Label: KRU Records, EMI Music Malaysia; Formats: CD, cassette, digital download	

=== Tributes ===
List of tribute albums
Title	Album details	Ref(s)
Viva Selangor	Released: 1997; Label: KRU Records, Government of Selangor; Formats: CD	
Urban Strike ...with Ella	Released: November 2006; Label: EMI Music Malaysia; Formats: CD, cassette, digital download	

=== Compilation albums ===
List of compilation albums
Title	Album details	Ref(s)
KRUmania	Released: 3 March 1997; Label: EMI Music Malaysia; Formats: CD, cassette, digital download	
Ideologi	Released: 13 March 2000; Label: EMI Music Malaysia; Formats: CD, cassette, digital download	
Ideologi 2	Released: 5 February 2001; Label: EMI Music Malaysia; Formats: CD, cassette, digital download	
Relax	Released: April 2004; Label: EMI Music Malaysia; Formats: CD, cassette, digital download	
Ultimatum	Released: 2010; Label: Universal Music Malaysia; Formats: CD, digital download	
KRU The Great: 20 Tahun - Suatu Mania	Released: 2011; Label: Universal Music Malaysia; Formats: CD, digital download	
Hitman	Released: January 2012; Label: Universal Music Malaysia; Formats: CD, digital download	
The Best of KRU	Released: June 2012; Label: Universal Music Malaysia; Formats: CD, digital download	
1	Released: 2015; Label: KRU Music, Universal Music Malaysia; Formats: CD, digital download	
Gergasi	Released: 21 May 2018; Label: KRU Music, Universal Music Malaysia; Formats: CD, digital download	

=== Other albums ===
List of other albums with description
Title	Album details	Description	Ref(s)
Tyco	Released: 14 December 2000; Label: EMI Music Malaysia; Formats: CD, cassette, digital download	KRU's first album as Tyco	
Yusry (Note: The album is sometimes titled Dekat Padamu by media outlets.)	Released: June 2003; Label: EMI Music Malaysia; Formats: CD, cassette, digital download	Yusry's first solo album	

== Extended plays ==
List of extended plays, with sales figures and certifications
Title	Album details	Sales	Certifications	Ref(s)
Awas!	Released: September 1994; Label: EMI Music Malaysia; Formats: CD, cassette, digital download	60,000	Double-Platinum	

== Singles ==
=== As lead artist ===
List of singles as lead artist, showing year released and originating album
Title	Year	Album	Ref(s)
"Cherrina"	1992	Canggih	
"Hanya Kau"	1992	Canggih	
"Sekali Lagi (Gadisku)"	1992	Canggih	
"Perception of Love"	1993	Canggih	
"20/20"	1993	Canggih	
"Mengerti"	1993	reKRUed	
"Gadis Jelita"	1993	reKRUed	
"Inikah Ertinya Cinta?"	1994	reKRUed	
"Janji Tinggal Janji"	1994	reKRUed	
"Katanya..."	1994	reKRUed	
"Awas!"	1994	Awas!	
"Untukmu"	1994	Awas!	
"Di Dalam Dilema"	1994	Awas!	
"E'nuff Eez E'nuff"	1995	Awas!	
"Negatif"	1995	Awas! da Soundtrack	
"2"	1995	Awas! da Soundtrack	
"I'll Be Waiting"	1995	Awas! da Soundtrack	
"Malam Kita"	1995	Awas! da Soundtrack	
"Emilia"	1995	Awas! da Soundtrack	
"Salah Siapa"	1996	Awas! da Soundtrack	
"Ooh! La! La!"	1996	Ooh! La! La!	
"Freaky G"	1996	Ooh! La! La!	
"Apa Saja"	1996	Ooh! La! La!	
"Diari Metropolitan" (feat. Elite)	1996	Ooh! La! La!	
"Balada Hati"	1996	Ooh! La! La!	
"Semuanya OK"	1997	Ooh! La! La!	
"Fanatik"	1997	KRUmania	
"Di Pintu Syurga" (feat. Elite)	1997	KRUmania	
"Getaran Jiwa" (feat. P. Ramlee)	1997	KRUmania	
"Fobia"	1998	Silat Legenda OST	
"Setia Bersama" (feat. Sheila Majid)	1998	Silat Legenda OST	
"The Way We Jam"	1998	The Way We Jam	
"For You"	1999	The Way We Jam	
"More Than Forever"	1999	The Way We Jam	
"Luar Biasa"	1999	Formula Luarbiasa	
"Formula"	1999	Formula Luarbiasa	
"Jangan Lafazkan"	1999	Formula Luarbiasa	
"Hilang Kawalan"	2000	Formula Luarbiasa	
"Penjunjung Namaku"	2000	Formula Luarbiasa	
"Bidadari"	2000	Tyco	
"With U"	2001	Tyco	
"Saat Ku Pejamkan Mata"	2001	Tyco	
"Supermokhtar"	2001	Tyco	
"Impak Maksima"	2002	KRUjaan	
"Aku Benci"	2002	KRUjaan	
"Mahaguru"	2002	KRUjaan	
"Sayang"	2002	KRUjaan	
"Bintang Popular"	2002	KRUjaan	
"Perpisahan Terasing"	2003	Empayar KRUjaan V2.0	
"Babe"	2004	Relax	
"Terhangat di Pasaran" (feat. Adam Mat Saman)	2005	KRUnisme	
"Empat Syarat"	2005	KRUnisme	
"Sampai"	2005	KRUnisme	
"Berat"	2005	KRUnisme	
"Gerenti Beres"	2006	10 di Skala Richter	
"Buat Hal Lagi" (feat. The Hits Squad)	2006	10 di Skala Richter	
"C'mon Lah"	2006	10 di Skala Richter	
"Kena Marah (Pun Tak Kisah)"	2007	10 di Skala Richter	
"La-Di-Da La-Di-Da"	2007	10 di Skala Richter	
"Planet Hitam"	2008	Cicakman 2: Planet Hitam OST	
"Ganas"	2011	Hitman	
"Tiga Kata"	2011	KRUnomena	
"Wanita"	2012	KRUnomena	
"Semalam Tanpamu" (feat. Stacy Anam)	2013	KRUnomena	
"Setiap"	2013	KRUnomena	
"Erti Aidilfitri"	2013	Non-album single	
"Hingga Ke Jannah"	2016	Non-album single	
"Tahan Lama" (feat. Joe Flizzow)	2018	Gergasi	
"Voodoo"	2024	Kaset	
"One More Time"	2025	Kaset	

=== As featured artist ===
List of singles as featured artist, showing year released and originating album
Title	Year	Album	Ref(s)
"Seperti Yang Ku Jangka" (Indigo feat. KRU)	2000	Episod 3	
"Sujud" (Mawi feat. KRU)	2009	Allah Habeebi	

=== Promotional singles ===
List of promotional singles, showing year released and originating album
Title	Year	Album	Ref(s)
"Everest"	1997	Konsert Kemuncak Dunia	
"Never Let the Spirit Die"	1998	Non-album single	
"Silat Legenda"	1998	Silat Legenda OST	
"Fiesta"	1999	Non-album single	
"Suluhkan Sinar" (with various artists)	2005	Non-album single	
"Gemuruh Suara" (with various artists)	2011	Non-album single	
"Kuasa Juara"	2015	Team Malaysia	

== Music videos ==
List of music videos, with director (when available) and year
Title	Year	Director	Ref(s)
"Cherrina"	1992	–	
"Hanya Kau"	1992	–	
"Mengerti"	1993	–	
"Janji Tinggal Janji"	1993	–	
"Awas!"	1994	–	
"Di Dalam Dilema"	1994	–	
"Malam Kita"	1995	–	
"Ooh! La! La!"	1996	Barney Chua	
"Apa Saja"	1996	–	
"Fanatik"	1997	Saw Teong Hin	
"Getaran Jiwa"	1997	Saw Teong Hin	
"Never Let the Spirit Die"	1998	Norman Abdul Halim	
"Fobia"	1998	–	
"The Way We Jam"	1998	Edry Abdul Halim	
"For You"	1999	–	
"More Than Forever"	1999	–	
"Jangan Lafazkan"	1999	–	
"Bidadari"	2001	–	
"With U"	2001	–	
"Impak Maksima"	2002	Virginia Kennedy	
"Perpisahan Terasing"	2003	–	
"Terhangat di Pasaran"	2005	–	
"Gerenti Beres"	2006	–	
"C'mon Lah"	2006	–	
"Ganas"	2011	–	
"Wanita"	2013	Waan Hafiz	
"Semalam Tanpamu"	2013	Yusry Abdul Halim	
"Hingga Ke Jannah"	2016	Waan Hafiz	
"Voodoo"	2024	Suhaimi Yayanto	
"One More Time"	2024	Suhaimi Yayanto	
" – " denotes no director information available.

== See also ==
- List of songs recorded by KRU
