= List of songs recorded by KRU =

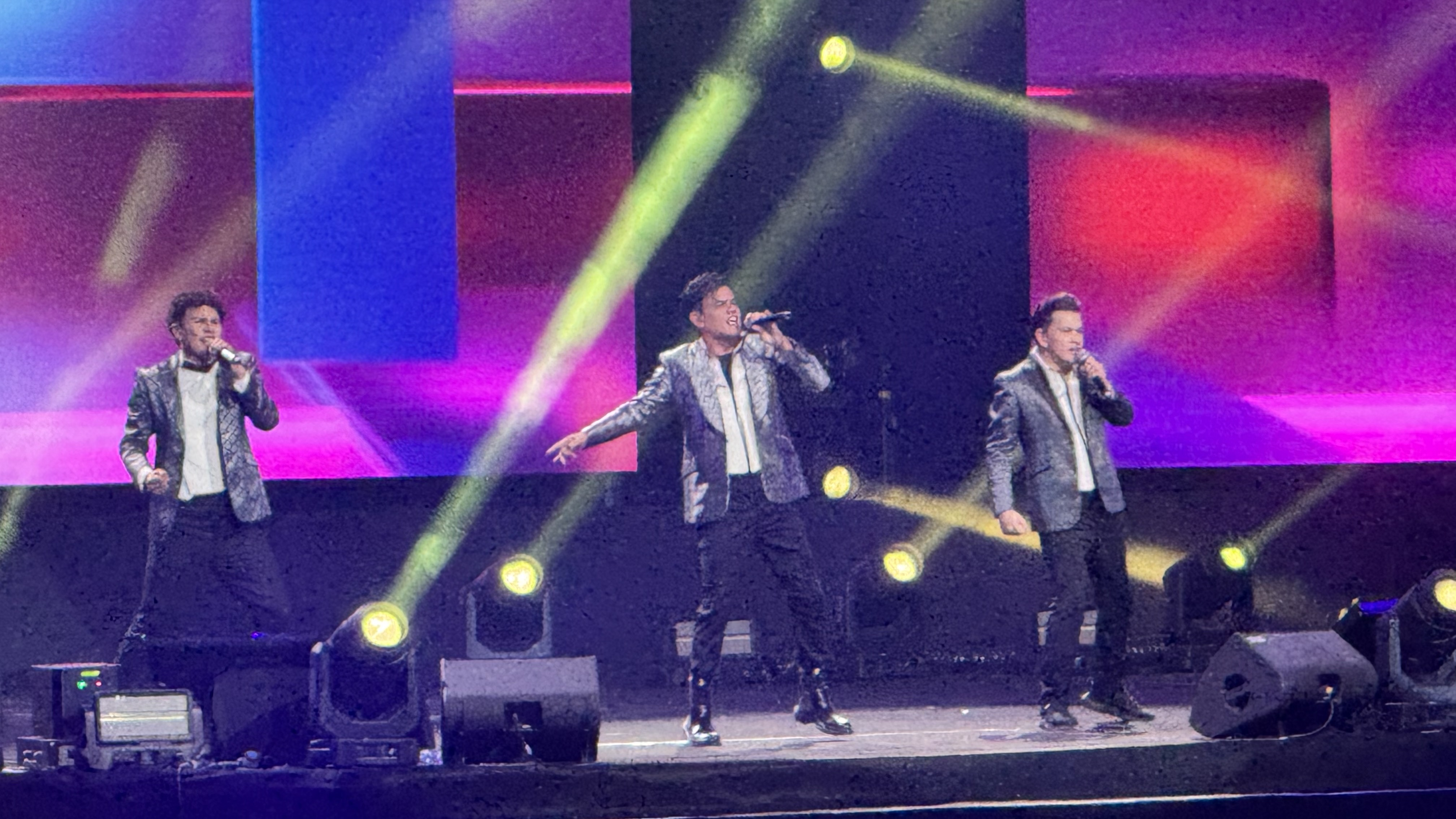
KRU performing live in 2025.

Malaysian boy band, KRU have recorded material for 14 studio albums as well as non-album singles. The majority of the group's original material is written and composed by the brothers themselves, most notably, Edry Abdul Halim, who is mainly involved in writing for their material, having contributed to lyrics and compositions for their major releases since their debut. After signing with EMI Music Malaysia, KRU began to recorded material for their debut studio album, Canggih, which was ultimately released in October 1992. The album, which spawned five singles including "Cherrina" and "Hanya Kau", encompassed pop, hip-hop, techno and R&B genres. But, Radio Televisyen Malaysia (RTM) complained that the album's contents promoting yellow culture. As a result, 9 out of 10 songs in the album were banned from airing. Their second album, reKRUed was released in October 1993, preceded by singles "Mengerti" and "Janji Tinggal Janji". The album received considerable attention from music critics for its rap and a cappella influences.

In 1994, KRU released their third album in an extended play (EP) format, Awas!. The album contains 6 songs including a new version of "Janji Tinggal Janji", which was included in reKRUed. Its title track was inspired by signboards and revolves on the stories of homewreckers. The group continued with similar musical styles for their subsequent albums. KRU's debut English album, The Way We Jam was released in November 1998. The album saws the brothers performs songs composed by international composers like Diane Warren (for "More Than Forever") and Babyface (for "Sweet November"). In addition, KRU also recorded songs for several occasions, most notably "Never Let the Spirit Die" for the 16th Commonwealth Games and "Fiesta" for the 1999 edition of Le Tour de Langkawi. They also contributed soundtracks written by themselves for two feature films, Awas! (1995) and Cinta Metropolitan (1996), which both they acted in. In the 1998 animated film, Silat Legenda, KRU recorded three songs for its soundtrack album: "Silat Legenda", "Fobia" and a duet with Sheila Majid, "Setia Bersama". In 2005, the brothers along with several other Malaysian artists performed "Suluhkan Sinar", which dedicated to the victims of the 2004 Indian Ocean earthquake and tsunami.

KRU also covered several works by other artists, most notably "Untukmu", the debut single performed by the now-defunct Malaysian girl group, Feminin from their 1993 debut album of the same name, which the brothers first wrote the song in 1988 and performed in an a cappella rendition for their Awas! album. Other notable songs covered by KRU including P. Ramlee's "Getaran Jiwa", Take 6's "You Can Never Ask Too Much (of Love)" and "Perpisahan Terasing" where they combined Revolvers' "Perpisahan" and Sudirman Arshad's "Terasing", which all of them were given new arrangements. The following is a list of songs recorded by KRU in alphabetical order. Songs performed but not recorded and interludes are not listed.

== Songs ==
Key
‡	Indicates single release
#	Indicates promotional single release
•	Indicates songs covered by KRU
±	Indicates songs KRU performed as Tyco

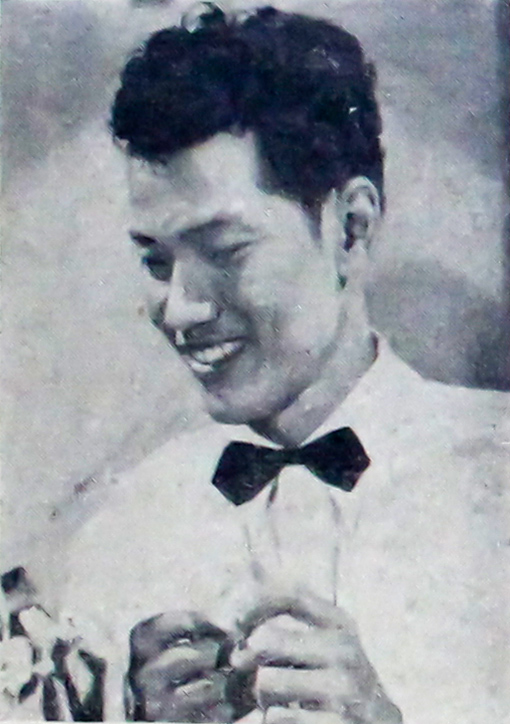
P. Ramlee appeared posthumously in KRU's 1997 rendition of "Getaran Jiwa".

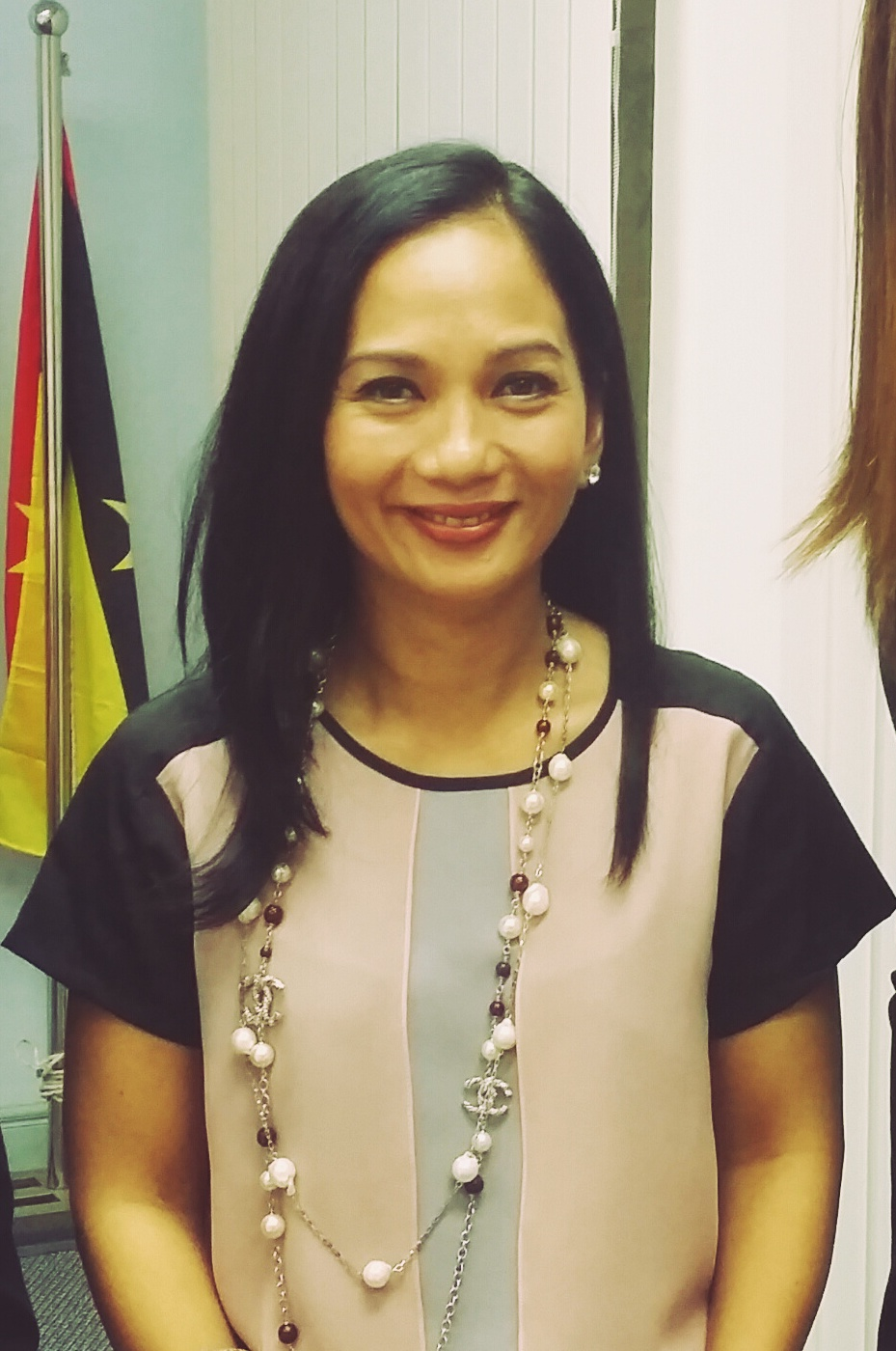
Sheila Majid appears as featured artist on "Setia Bersama", one of the three songs KRU recorded for the Silat Legenda soundtrack album.

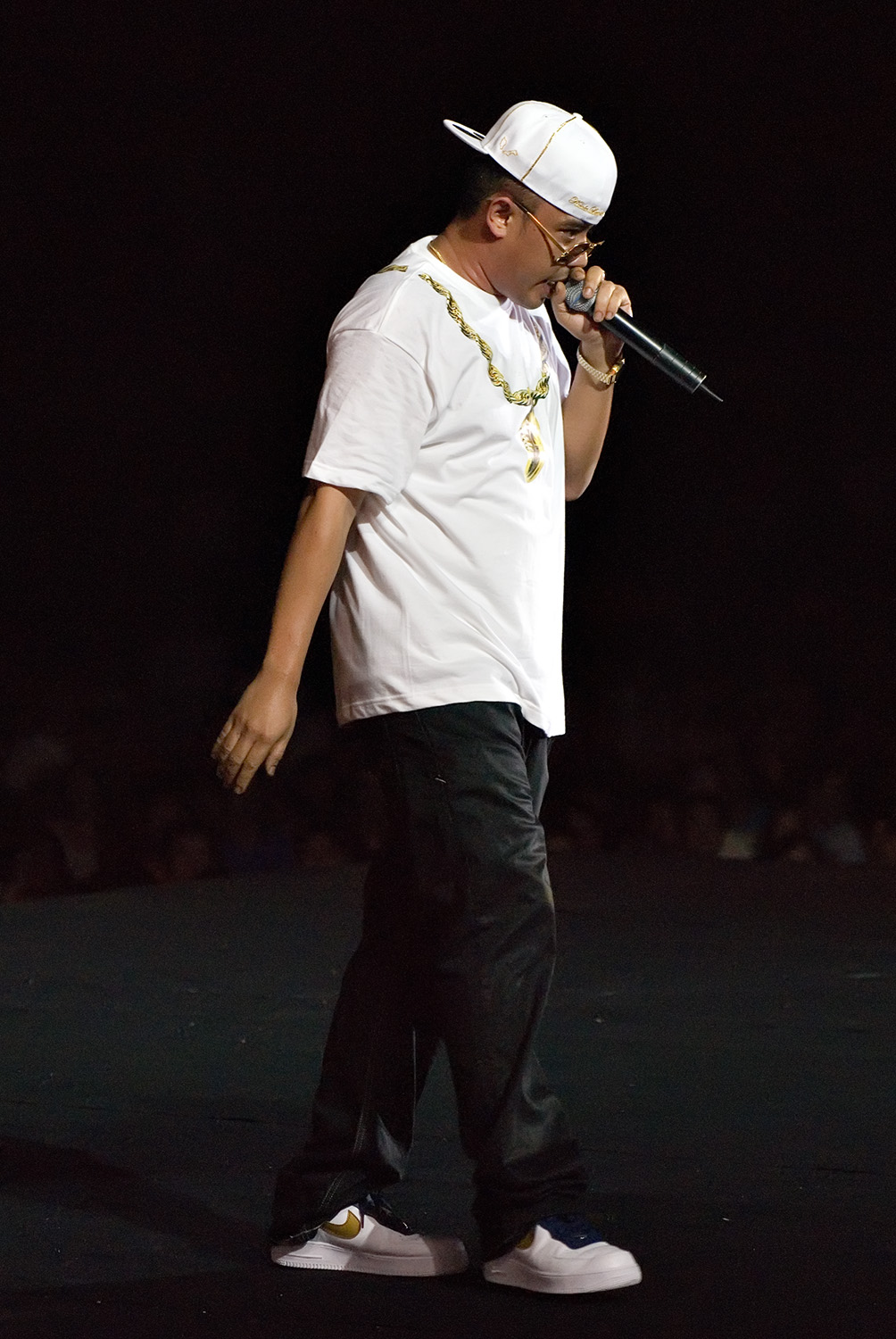
Joe Flizzow appears as featured artist on "Tahan Lama", KRU's final official recording before their split.

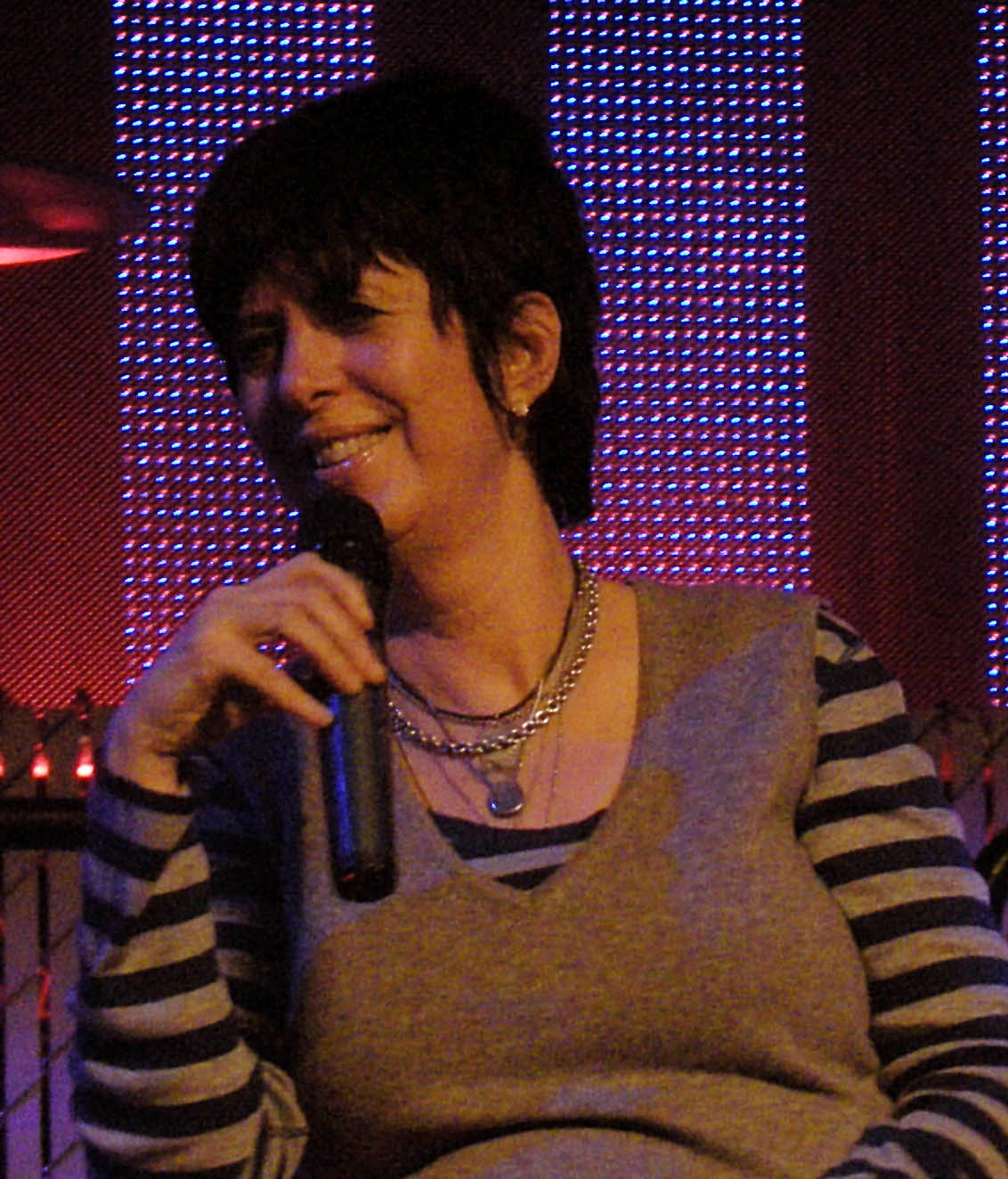
Diane Warren wrote "More Than Forever" for KRU's debut English album The Way We Jam.

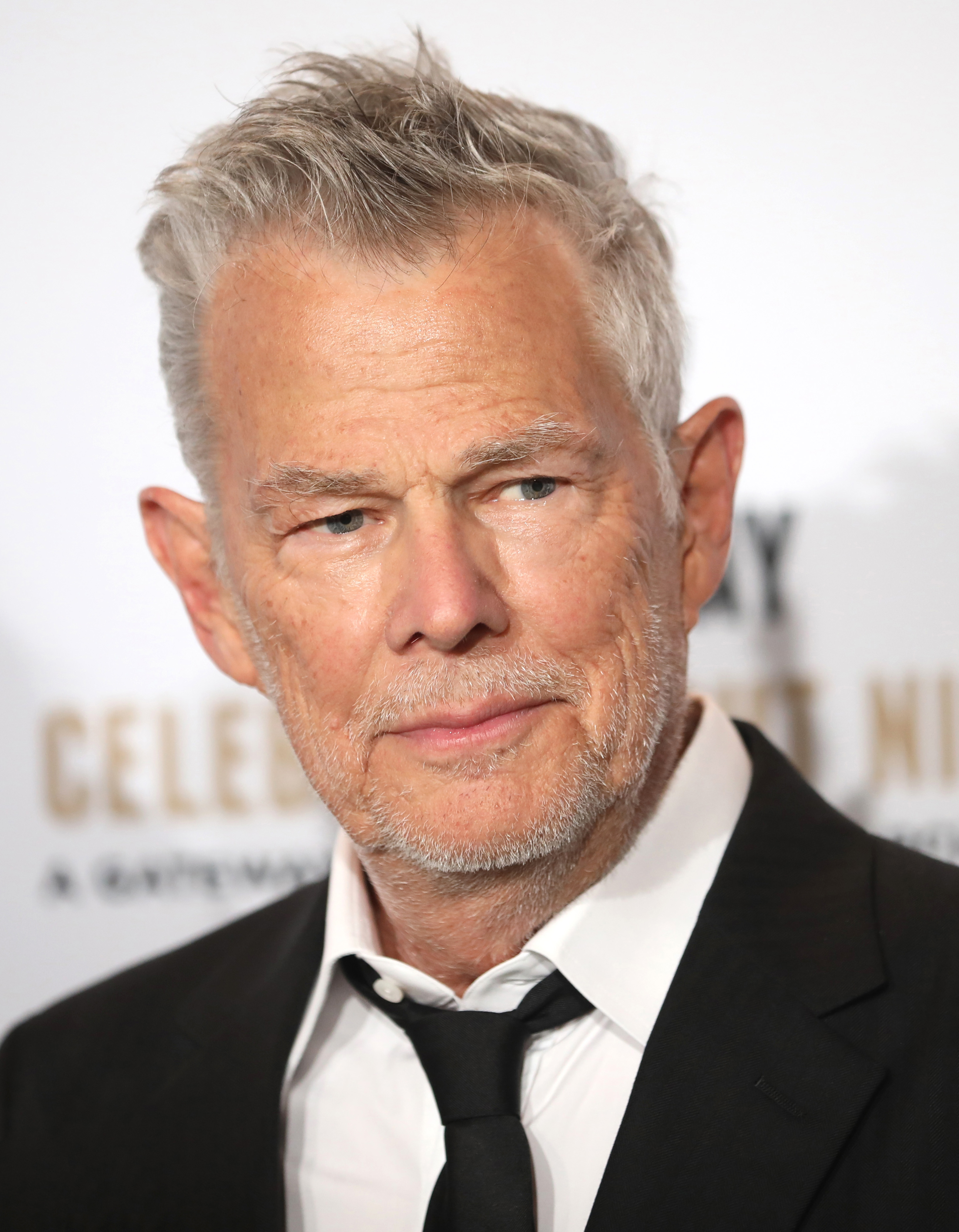
David Foster wrote "Never Ask Too Much (of Love)" for The Way We Jam.

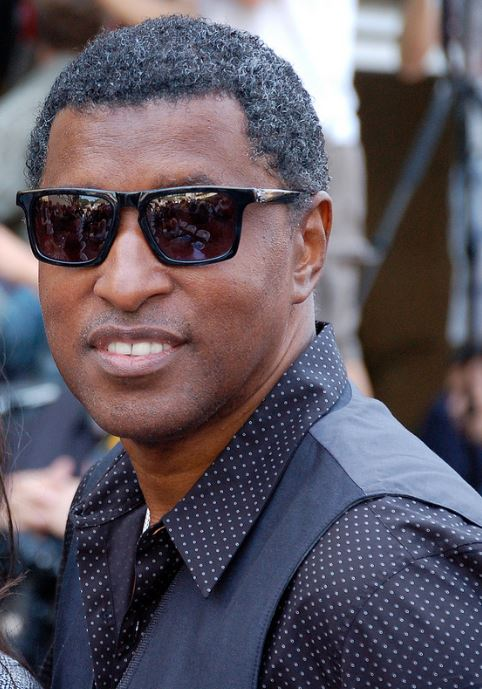
Kenneth "Babyface" Edmonds wrote "Sweet November", which was included as the last track on The Way We Jam.

Name of song, writer(s), language(s), album and year of release.
Song	Writer(s)	Language(s)	Album	Year	Ref(s).
"2" ‡	KRU	Malay	Awas! da' Soundtrack	1995	
"20/20" ‡	KRU	Malay	Canggih	1992	
"Agung"	KRU	Malay	Kaset	2025	
"Ain't Got No Soul"	KRU	English	Canggih	1992	
"Aku Benci" ‡	KRU	Malay	KRUjaan	2002	
"Ampuniku"	KRU	Malay	Empayar KRUjaan V2.0	2002	
"Aneh"	KRU	Malay	Awas! da' Soundtrack	1995	
"Apa Saja" ‡	KRU	Malay	Ooh! La! La!	1996	
"Asimilasi 106"	KRU	Malay	reKRUed	1993	
"Awas!" ‡	KRU	Malay	Awas!	1994	
"Babe" ‡	KRU	Malay	Relax	2004	
"Balada Hati"	KRU	Malay	Ooh! La! La!	1996	
"Berat" ‡	Edry Abdul Halim	Malay	KRUnisme	2005	
"Bidadari" ±	KRU	Malay	Tyco	2001	
"Bintang Popular" ‡	KRU	Malay	KRUjaan	2002	
"Bom!" ±	KRU	Malay	Tyco	2001	
"Boom!"	KRU	English	Ooh! La! La!	1996	
"Buat Hal Lagi" (feat. The Hit Squad) ‡	Edry Abdul Halim	Malay	10 di Skala Richter	2006	
"Cherrina" ‡	KRU	Malay	Canggih	1992	
"Ciptaan Sempurna"	KRU	Malay	Kaset	2025	
"C'mon Lah" ‡	Edry Abdul Halim	English	10 di Skala Richter	2006	
"Da Party"	KRU	English	reKRUed	1993	
"Deja Vu"	KRU	Malay	Formula Luarbiasa	1999	
"Diari Metropolitan" (feat. Elite) ‡	KRU	Malay	Ooh! La! La!	1996	
"Di Dalam Dilema" ‡	KRU	Malay	Awas!	1994	
"Di Depan Mata"	KRU	Malay	reKRUed	1993	
"Di Hatimu"	KRU	Malay	Relax	2004	
"Di Pintu Syurga" (feat. Elite) ‡	KRU	Malay	KRUmania	1997	
"Do My Thang (Upside Down)"	KRU	English	The Way We Jam	1998	
"Drama"	Edry Abdul Halim	Malay	10 di Skala Richter	2006	
"Emilia"	KRU	Malay	Awas! da' Soundtrack	1995	
"Empat Syarat" ‡	Edry Abdul Halim	Malay	KRUnisme	2005	
"E'nuff Eez E'nuff" ‡	KRU	English	Awas!	1994	
"Erti Aidilfitri" ‡	KRU	Malay	Non-album single	2013	
"Everest" #	KRU	Malay	Konsert Kemuncak Dunia	1997	
"Every Single Minute"	KRU	English	The Way We Jam	1998	
"Fanatik" (feat. DanceKRU, Indigo & Elite) ‡	KRU	Malay	KRUmania	1997	
"Fiesta" (feat. various artists) #	KRU	Malay	Non-album single	1999	
"Fobia" ‡	KRU	Malay	Silat Legenda OST	1998	
"Formula" ‡	KRU	Malay	Formula Luarbiasa	1999	
"For You" ‡	Dwight Sills, London Jones	English	The Way We Jam	1998	
"Freaky G" ‡	KRU	English	Ooh! La! La!	1996	
"Gadis Jelita (O.T. Enchanted Lady)"	KRU	Malay	reKRUed	1993	
"Ganas" (Note: "Ganas" was released as the only single and new recording for Hitman (2012), a compilation album contains songs composed by Edry and performed by Malaysian renowned singers. The single was later included in KRU's thirteenth studio album, KRUnomena (2013).) ‡	KRU	Malay	Hitman	2011	
"Gemuruh Suara" (feat. various artists) #	KRU	Malay, English	Non-album single	2011	
"Generasiku"	Ritchie Blackmore, Roger Glover, Jon Lord, Ian Paice, KRU	Malay	Canggih	1992	
"Gerenti Beres" ‡	Edry Abdul Halim	Malay	10 di Skala Richter	2006	
"Get in 2 the Hype"	KRU	English	Canggih	1992	
"Getaran Jiwa" (Note: Original song performed by P. Ramlee from his 1960 film, Antara Dua Darjat.) (feat. P. Ramlee) •	P. Ramlee, S. Sudarmaji	Malay	KRUmania	1997	
"Girlfriend's Girlfriend"	KRU	English	Ooh! La! La!	1996	
"Go! KRU (T.R.R.G.)"	KRU	English	reKRUed	1993	
"GOAT"	KRU	English	Kaset	2025	
"Hambadansa"	KRU	Malay	Kaset	2025	
"Hanya Kau" ‡	KRU	Malay	Canggih	1992	
"Hidup-Hidup Ditipu" (Note: Original song performed by Malaysian heavy metal band, Dr. Kronik as "Hidup-Hidup Dibakar" from their 2000 studio album, Buragas.) •	KRU	Malay	Empayar KRUjaan V2.0	2002	
"High Maintenance"	KRU	English	Kaset	2025	
"Hilang Kawalan"	KRU	Malay	Formula Luarbiasa	1999	
"Hingga Ke Jannah" ‡	KRU	Malay	Non-album single	2016	
"Hot Gal"	Edry Abdul Halim	English	10 di Skala Richter	2006	
"I Am"	KRU	English	KRUjaan	2002	
"Ikhtiar"	KRU	Malay	KRUjaan	2002	
"I'll Be Waiting" ‡	KRU	English	Awas! da' Soundtrack	1995	
"I'll Make You Famous"	KRU	English	Formula Luarbiasa	1999	
"Impak Maksima" ‡	KRU	Malay	KRUjaan	2002	
"Inikah Ertinya Cinta?" ‡	KRU	Malay	reKRUed	1993	
"I.R.A."	KRU	English	reKRUed	1993	
"Jangan Lafazkan" ‡	KRU	Malay	Formula Luarbiasa	1999	
"Janji Tinggal Janji" ‡	KRU	Malay	reKRUed	1993	
"Jutawan" ±	KRU	Malay	Tyco	2001	
"Kali Ke-2"	Norman Abdul Halim	Malay	KRUnomena	2013	
"Katanya" ‡	KRU	Malay	reKRUed	1993	
"Kehilangan"	KRU	Malay	Awas! da' Soundtrack	1995	
"(Kena Marah Pun) Tak Kisah" ‡	Edry Abdul Halim	Malay	10 di Skala Richter	2006	
"Kesejatian Cnta"	Edry Abdul Halim	Malay	KRUnomena	2013	
"KRU is Wild"	KRU	English	reKRUed	1993	
"Kuasa Juara" #	KRU	Malay	Non-album single	2015	
"La-Di-Da La-Di-Da"	Edry Abdul Halim	Malay	10 di Skala Richter	2006	
"Lagu dan Lirik"	Edry Abdul Halim	Malay	KRUnomena	2013	
"Lagu Untuk Mamat"	KRU	Malay	10 di Skala Richter	2006	
"Leave That Girl Alone"	Sean Hall, Thabiso Nkhereanye, Christopher Stewart	English	The Way We Jam	1998	
"Luar Biasa" ‡	KRU	Malay	Formula Luarbiasa	1999	
"Mahaguru" ‡	KRU	Malay	KRUjaan	2002	
"Malam Kita" ‡	KRU	Malay	Awas! da' Soundtrack	1995	
"Masih Bersama"	Edry Abdul Halim	Malay	KRUnisme	2005	
"Mati Muda" ±	KRU	Malay	Tyco	2001	
"Mengerti" ‡	KRU	Malay	reKRUed	1993	
"More Than Forever" ‡	Diane Warren	English	The Way We Jam	1998	
"My Evil Twin"	Edry Abdul Halim	English	KRUnisme	2005	
"Negatif" ‡	KRU	Malay	Awas! da' Soundtrack	1995	
"Never Ask Too Much (of Love)" (Note: Original song performed by the American gospel music group, Take 6 from their 1994 album, Join the Band.) •	Cedric Dent, David Foster, Linda Thompson	English	The Way We Jam	1998	
"Never Let the Spirit Die" #	KRU	English	Non-album single	1998	
"Never Trust a Man Again" ±	KRU	English	Tyco	2001	
"One More Time" ‡	KRU	Malay	Kaset	2025	
"Ooh! La! La!" ‡	KRU	Malay	Ooh! La! La!	1996	
"Out of My Mind"	KRU	English	The Way We Jam	1998	
"Peminat #1"	Edry Abdul Halim	Malay	KRUnisme	2005	
"Penganggur Profesional"	KRU	Malay	KRUjaan	2002	
"Penjunjung Namaku"	KRU	Malay	Formula Luarbiasa	1999	
"People Come People Go" ±	KRU	English	Tyco	2001	
"Perception of Love" ‡	KRU	English	Canggih	1992	
"Perpisahan Terasing" (Note: Original song performed by Malaysian slow rock band, Revolvers as "Perpisahan" from their 1980 studio album of the same name and by Malaysian singer, Sudirman Arshad as "Terasing" from his 1984 studio album, Orang Baru.) •	Freddie Fernandez, Manan Ngah, Anuar Razak, Habsah Hassan	Malay	Empayar KRUjaan V2.0	2002	
"Persetankannya"	KRU	Malay	Ooh! La! La!	1996	
"Planet Hitam" ±	KRU	Malay	Cicakman 2: Planet Hitam OST	2008	
"Puteri Kayangan"	KRU	Malay	Formula Luarbiasa	1999	
"Remaja Selamanya"	KRU	Malay	Kaset	2025	
"Rock It!"	Edry Abdul Halim	English	KRUnisme	2005	
"Saat Ku Pejamkan Mata" ±	KRU	Malay	Tyco	2001	
"Sack da Boss"	KRU	English	Awas! da' Soundtrack	1995	
"Salah Siapa"	KRU	Malay	Awas! da' Soundtrack	1995	
"Sampai" ‡	Edry Abdul Halim	Malay	KRUnisme	2005	
"Sampai Sini Saja"	KRU	Malay	Kaset	2025	
"Sandiwara" ±	KRU	Malay	Tyco	2001	
"Sayang" ‡	KRU	Malay	KRUjaan	2002	
"Sediakala"	Edry Abdul Halim	Malay	KRUnomena	2013	
"Sehari Dalam Hidup"	Edry Abdul Halim	Malay	10 di Skala Richter	2006	
"Sekali Lagi (Gadisku)" ‡	KRU	Malay	Canggih	1992	
"Seksa" (Note: Original song performed by Anita Sarawak as "Seksis" from her 2004 studio album of the same name.) •	Edry Abdul Halim	Malay	KRUnisme	2005	
"Selamat Hari Lahir"	KRU	Malay	Kaset	2025	
"Semalam Tanpamu" (feat. Stacy Anam) ‡	Edry Abdul Halim	Malay	KRUnomena	2013	
"Sempoi"	KRU	Malay	Canggih	1992	
"Sempurna"	Edry Abdul Halim	Malay	KRUnisme	2005	
"Semuanya OK" ‡	KRU	Malay	Ooh! La! La!	1996	
"Separuh Mati"	Edry Abdul Halim	Malay	KRUnomena	2013	
"Setia Bersama" (feat. Sheila Majid) ‡	KRU	Malay	Silat Legenda OST	1998	
"Setiap" ‡	Edry Abdul Halim	Malay	KRUnomena	2013	
"Silat Legenda" #	KRU	Malay	Silat Legenda OST	1998	
"Supermokhtar" ±	KRU	Malay	Tyco	2001	
"Suluhkan Sinar" (feat. various artists) #	KRU	Malay	Non-album single	2005	
"Sweet November"	Kenneth "Babyface" Edmonds	English	The Way We Jam	1998	
"Tahan Lama" (feat. Joe Flizzow)	KRU	Malay	Non-album single	2018	
"Teka-Teki"	KRU	Malay	Formula Luarbiasa	1999	
"Terhangat di Pasaran" (feat. Adam Mat Saman) ‡	Edry Abdul Halim	Malay	KRUnisme	2005	
"Terima Kasih"	KRU	Malay	reKRUed	1993	
"The Belly Dance"	KRU	English	KRUjaan	2002	
"The D"	KRU	English	The Way We Jam	1998	
"The Way We Jam" ‡	KRU	English	The Way We Jam	1998	
"Tiga Kata" ‡	Edry Abdul Halim	Malay	KRUnomena	2013	
"Tribe"	KRU	English	The Way We Jam	1998	
"Ucapkanlah" (feat. Erra Fazira) ‡	KRU	Malay	KRUjaan	2002	
"U Got Style"	KRU	English	Empayar KRUjaan V2.0	2002	
"Ulangkan Sekali Lagi"	KRU	Malay	Ooh! La! La!	1996	
"U Make My Day" (feat. Seha Freedom)	KRU	English	Canggih	1992	
"Untukmu" (Note: Original song performed by the Malaysian girl group, Feminin from their 1993 album of the same name.) •	KRU	Malay	Awas!	1994	
"Vendetta"	KRU	English	Awas! da' Soundtrack	1995	
"Voodoo" ‡	KRU	Malay	Kaset	2025	
"Wanita" ‡	Edry Abdul Halim	Malay	KRUnomena	2013	
"Wanita Jelita"	KRU	English	The Way We Jam	1998	
"What If She Knew"	KRU	English	Formula Luarbiasa	1999	
"Why Must I Feel Like That"	David Spradley, Dicky Antoine, Erick Sermon, Garry Shider, George Clinton, Larry Troutman, Leon Sylvers, Markell Riley, Roger Troutman, Teddy Riley	English	The Way We Jam	1998	
"With You" ±	KRU	English	Tyco	2001	
"Won't Look Back"	KRU	English	The Way We Jam	1998	
"Ya Habibati"	Edry Abdul Halim	Malay, Arabic	10 di Skala Richter	2006	

== See also ==
- KRU discography
