= Relax (KRU album) =

Compilation album by KRU
- Released: April 2004
- Recorded: 1992–2004
- Genres: Pop; Hip-hop; R&B
- Length: 67:41
- Label: EMI Music Malaysia
- Producer: KRU

KRU chronology
Empayar KRUjaan V2.0 (2002)	Relax (2004)	KRUnisme (2005)

Singles from Relax
- 1. "Babe" Released: March 2004

Relax is the second compilation album by Malaysian boy band, KRU. It was released in April 2004 by EMI Music Malaysia. The compilation includes several of their popular songs, as well as new material.

== Background ==
The album contains nearly all of the KRU's singles since the start of their career in 1992. "Babe" and "Di Hatimu" was a new material recorded for the album. Singles are not included in KRU albums were "Never Let the Spirit Die", which was a theme song for the 1998 Commonwealth Games, and "Seperti Yang Ku Jangka" with Malaysian vocal harmony group, Indigo from their third album, Episod 3, in which KRU as a featured artist. The KRU brothers described Relax as a transition of their musical direction. The album was released in April 2004 and preceded by its lead single, "Babe".

== Track listing ==
All tracks are written by Norman, Yusry and Edry Abdul Halim except where noted.

No.	Title	Writer(s)	Original album	Length
1.	"Babe"		N/A	4:39
2.	"Di Hatimu"		N/A	4:18
3.	"Perpisahan Terasing"	Freddie Fernandez; Manan Ngah; Anuar Razak; Habsah Hassan	Empayar KRUjaan V2.0	3:48
4.	"Di Pintu Syurga" (feat. Elite)		KRUmania	4:03
5.	"Jangan Lafazkan"		Formula Luarbiasa	4:43
6.	"Apa Saja"		Ooh! La! La!	4:20
7.	"Sayang"		KRUjaan	3:51
8.	"Untukmu"		Awas!	3:45
9.	"More Than Forever"	Diane Warren	The Way We Jam	4:55
10.	"Seperti Yang Ku Jangka" (feat. Indigo)			5:21
11.	"2"		Awas! da' Soundtrack	4:08
12.	"Saat Ku Pejamkan Mata"		Tyco	3:50
13.	"Balada Hati"		Ooh! La! La!	3:53
14.	"For You"	Dwight Sills; London Jones	The Way We Jam	3:51
15.	"Penjunjung Namaku"		Formula Luarbiasa	4:41
16.	"Getaran Jiwa" (feat. P. Ramlee)	P. Ramlee; S. Sudarmaji	KRUmania	3:52
17.	"Never Let the Spirit Die"			4:55
18.	"Janji Tinggal Janji"		reKRUed	4:55
Total length:				67:41
