= GenKRU the Finale: One More Time =

- Concert by KRU
- Promotional poster
- Location: Bukit Jalil, Kuala Lumpur, Malaysia
- Venue: Bukit Jalil National Hockey Stadium
- Date: 22 November 2025
- Guests: Juliana Banos; Elite; Hasmiza "Vida" Othman; Adam Mat Saman; Rabbani; Dina Nadzir; Kasih Iris Leona
- Attendance: 15,000

KRU concert chronology
- GenKRU (2025); GenKRU the Finale: One More Time (2025)

GenKRU the Finale: One More Time was a concert tour by Malaysian boy band, KRU. The concert, organised by Icon Entertainment, was held at the Bukit Jalil National Hockey Stadium in Bukit Jalil, Kuala Lumpur on 22 November 2025 and serves as the finale concert for their successful GenKRU concert series. The set list featured songs taken from KRU's discography. Like the first one, it also received positive feedback and reviews from concert reviewers and critics who praised KRU's vocals and overall showmanship.

== Background and development ==
Following the massive success of their GenKRU concert, KRU announced in a press conference that they would headlined a finale concert of the GenKRU concert series, entitled GenKRU the Finale: One More Time. Norman, the eldest of the KRU brothers, revealed that the concert come up with a different scale as it would be held in an open venue, which marks the first time in their music career, they headlined a concert from indoor to outdoor venue.

== Concert synopsis ==
The concert began at 8:45 pm with the KRU brothers performing the first song "Mengerti", followed by a medley of "Fobia" and "Salah Siapa". They later performed songs on their set list including "Awas!", "Fanatik" and "Terhangat di Pasaran". Several of KRU's protégés were also perform together with them on stage, including girl group Elite, Sabahan hip-hop singer Adam Mat Saman, nasyid group Rabbani, and singer-actress Juliana Banos. Edry came as a duet partner with Juliana and performing "Sehidup Semati". During their performances, the KRU brothers hide away their restless following their father, Abdul Halim Kamal, who was hospitalized due to liver infection.

== Critical reception ==
The concert was met with positive responses from critics and concert reviewers, who praised KRU's showmanship and vocal abilities. Writing for Sinar Harian, Nurezzatul Aqmar Mustaza described the KRU brothers' presence in the music industry is "still relevant, still potent and still capable of dominating large-scale stages with international-class production quality". Nurhafizah Tan from Bernama described the concert as a "perfect closing" for KRU and wrote, "It became a perfect finale for KRU's 30 years of their career, thus leaving a sweet memories for fans who grew up with their musical evolution".

== Commercial performance ==
Ticket sales for the concert was opened on 3 October and have been sold out in less than an hour.

The concert was held on 22 November at the Bukit Jalil National Hockey Stadium and become a commercial success when it was attended by 10,000 audiences.

== Set list ==
The set list is adapted from the concert's liner notes. The list evolved over the course of the concert, and sometimes included other numbers.

1. "Go! KRU (T.R.R.G.)"
2. "Sayang"
3. "Apa Saja"
4. "Di Dalam Dilema"
5. "Jangan Lafazkan"
6. "Tiga Kata"
7. "Ulangkan Sekali Lagi"
8. "Awas!"
9. "Janji Tinggal Janji"
10. "Sehidup Semati"
11. "Remaja Selamanya"
12. "(Kena Marah Pun) Tak Kisah"
13. "One More Time"
14. "Freaky G"
15. "Gerenti Beres"
16. "The Way We Jam"
17. "Diari Metropolitan"
18. "Dekat Padamu"
19. "Voodoo"
20. "Sampai"
21. "Mengerti"
22. "Terhangat di Pasaran"
23. "Negatif"
24. "Ooh! La! La!"
25. "Intifada"
26. "Emilia"
27. "Fobia"
28. "Salah Siapa"
29. "Fanatik"
30. "I'll Be Waiting"

== Shows ==
Date	City	Country	Venue	Attendance
22 November 2025	Kuala Lumpur	Malaysia	Bukit Jalil National Hockey Stadium	15,000

== Personnel ==
- KRU – performer
- Juliana Banos – guest performer
- Elite – guest performer
- Hasmiza "Vida" Othman – guest performer
- Adam Mat Saman – guest performer
- Rabbani – guest performer
- Dina Nadzir – guest performer
- Kasih Iris Leona – guest performer
- Iman Tang – concert promoter
- Icon Entertainment – concert organiser
- Astro Radio – official radio sponsor
- thenews.com.my – official media partner
- Astro Gempak – official digital media
- Kesion – official indoor media
- Warisan Ad Outdoor – official outdoor media
- Ticket2U – official ticketing
- DTC - official transportation
- Opah - official food & beverage
