= Kaset =

Kaset may refer to:

- Kaset Sombun district (Thai: เกษตรสมบูรณ์), a district in Chaiyaphum Province, Thailand
- Kaset Wisai district (Thai: เกษตรวิสัย), a district in Roi Et Province, Thailand
- Kaset Green Hawk, aerial display team of the Bureau of Royal Rainmaking and Agricultural Aviation (KASET) of Thailand
- Kaset Rojananil, commander of the Royal Thai Air Force
- Kaset (album), an album by KRU
