= KRUmania =

Compilation album by KRU
- Released: 3 March 1997
- Recorded: 1992–1997
- Genre: Pop; Hip-hop; R&B
- Length: 71:37
- Label: EMI Music Malaysia
- Producer: KRU

KRU chronology
Ooh! La! La! (1996)	KRUmania (1997)	The Way We Jam (1998)

Singles from KRUmania
- 1. "Fanatik" Released: 28 February 1997; 2. "Getaran Jiwa" Released: 1 March 1997

KRUmania is the debut compilation album by Malaysian boy band, KRU. It was released on 3 March 1997 by EMI Music Malaysia. The compilation includes several of their popular songs, as well as new material.

== Background ==
To mark their fifth year in the Malaysian music industry, KRU began selected some of their popular hits for what would become KRUmania. They selected "Cherrina" from Canggih (1992), two songs from reKRUed (1993), eight songs from both Awas! (1994) and Awas! da' Soundtrack (1995) and three songs from Ooh! La! La! (1996). KRU also included a medley of their tracks from their first three albums. They felt that the compilation revolves on their life experience throughout their music career. The album also included three new songs, including "Fanatik", its lead single.

KRU also recorded new version of P. Ramlee's "Getaran Jiwa", a theme song for his 1960 film, Antara Dua Darjat. It was performed as a "digital duet" where the KRU brothers sang along with archived Ramlee's recorded vocals. P. Ramlee had died in 1973. The rendition of "Getaran Jiwa" have earned KRU a recognition from The Malaysia Book of Records as the first Malaysian artist to have a digital duet with a deceased musician. However, KRU faced criticism over their collaboration with P. Ramlee for that song, while Malaysian public broadcaster, Radio Televisyen Malaysia (RTM) banned the song, citing religious concerns.

== Track listing ==
All tracks are written by Norman, Yusry and Edry Abdul Halim except where noted.

No.	Title	Writer(s)	Original album	Length
1.	"Fanatik" (feat. DanceKRU, Elite & Indigo)		N/A	3:52
2.	"Awas!"		Awas!	4:27
3.	"Apa Saja"		Ooh! La! La!	4:18
4.	"Maniamedley" (Hanya Kau, Inikah Ertinya Cinta & Katanya)		N/A	4:04
5.	"Negatif"		Awas!	3:53
6.	"Mengerti"		reKRUed	5:08
7.	"Untukmu"		Awas!	3:41
8.	"Freaky G"		Ooh! La! La!	2:45
9.	"Di Pintu Syurga" (feat. Elite)		N/A	4:00
10.	"Ooh! La! La!"		Ooh! La! La!	3:30
11.	"Janji Tinggal Janji"		reKRUed	4:55
12.	"I'll Be Waiting"		Awas! da' Soundtrack	4:06
13.	"Di Dalam Dilema"		Awas!	4:20
14.	"2"		Awas! da' Soundtrack	4:04
15.	"Malam Kita"		Awas! da' Soundtrack	3:43
16.	"Cherrina"		Canggih	3:55
17.	"E’nuff Eez E’nuff"		Awas!	3:21
18.	"Getaran Jiwa" (feat. P. Ramlee)	P. Ramlee; S. Sudarmaji	N/A	3:48
Total length:				71:37

Notes

- Original running time for "Janji Tinggal Janji" was 6 minutes and 18 seconds.
- Original running time for "I'll Be Waiting" was 4 minutes and 35 seconds.
- Original running time for "Malam Kita" was 3 minutes and 43 seconds.

== Release ==
KRUmania was released on 3 March 1997 to popular success and sold over 80,000 copies in 5 days upon its release. As of 2000, the compilation was sold over 150,000 copies. "Fanatik" and "Getaran Jiwa" was released as singles and later made into music videos. The compilation was released in Indonesia on 4 April.

== Release history ==
Region	Release date	Format	Label
Malaysia, Singapore	3 March 1997	CD, Digital download	EMI Music Malaysia
Indonesia	4 April 1997	CD, Digital download	EMI Music Indonesia
