= Tyco (album) =

Studio album by KRU
- Released: 14 December 2000
- Recorded: 2000
- Studio: KRU Studios
- Genre: Electronic; techno
- Length: 36:45
- Label: EMI Music Malaysia
- Producer: KRU

KRU chronology
Formula Luarbiasa (1999)	Tyco (2000)	KRUjaan (2002)

Singles from Tyco
- 1. "Bidadari" Released: November 2000; 2. "With U" Released: March 2001; 3. "Saat Ku Pejamkan Mata" Released: September 2001

Tyco is the eighth studio album by Malaysian boy band, KRU and their first and only release under the name Tyco, which was their virtual artist project launched in 2000. The album was released on 14 December 2000 by EMI Music Malaysia.

== Background and release ==
After releasing studio albums as KRU, the KRU brothers began working on new music and came up with Tyco, Malaysia's first 3D virtual group in 2000. According to KRU, Tyco was an experimental project where they plays the key role as virtual artists behind animated characters, a concept which was new to the Malaysian music industry at the time.

For the album and Tyco themselves, KRU incorporated a futuristic concepts with the combination of acoustic and aggressive instrumental. Like their previous albums which they recorded as KRU, Tyco also contains both Malay and English songs. The album was produced by KRU, with Yusry and Edry handling the arrangements and instruments.

Tyco was released on 14 December 2000 to popular success. Three singles were released from the album: "Bidadari", "With U" and "Saat Ku Pejamkan Mata". Music videos were produced for "Bidadari" and "With U", utilising computer-generated imagery (CGI).

== Track listing ==
All tracks are written by Norman, Yusry and Edry Abdul Halim.

No.	Title	Length
1.	"Tyco"	0:28
2.	"With U"	3:45
3.	"People Come People Go"	3:48
4.	"Bidadari"	3:58
5.	"Saat Ku Pejamkan Mata"	3:46
6.	"Action Hero"	0:07
7.	"Sandiwara"	3:17
8.	"Supermokhtar"	3:41
9.	"Cyber"	0:08
10.	"Jutawan"	3:28
11.	"King Kazu"	0:21
12.	"Bom!"	3:26
13.	"Mati Muda"	3:34
14.	"Never Trust a Man Again"	2:51
Total length:		36:45

== Personnel ==
Credits adapted from Tyco booklet liner notes.

- KRU – vocals, backing vocals, mixer, composer, lyrics, arranger, producer, instruments, engineer
- Mohd Arzmy – executive producer
- Kelly – bass
- As – instruments
- Cody – instruments
- Iqmal Ali – A&R
- Tarmizi "Miji" Mokhtar – A&R
- Rina – A&R
- Ajoi – engineer
- Ijan – engineer
- Suzanne Kong – graphics
- Erland Kok – promotion

== Release history ==
Region	Release date	Format	Label
Malaysia	14 December 2000	CD, Digital download	EMI Music Malaysia
