= Kaset (album) =

Studio album by KRU
- Released: 25 April 2025
- Recorded: October 2024 – March 2025
- Studios: 5ci5 Studio; White Room; The Verve
- Genres: Pop; Hip-hop; R&B
- Length: 35:45
- Labels: KRU Music; Sony Music Malaysia
- Producer: Edry Abdul Halim

KRU chronology
Gergasi (2018)	Kaset (2025)

Singles from Kaset
- 1. "Voodoo" Released: 22 November 2024; 2. "One More Time" Released: 17 January 2025; 3. "Remaja Selamanya" Released: 24 April 2025

Kaset (Cassette) is the fourteenth studio album by Malaysian boy band, KRU, released on 25 April 2025 by KRU Music and Sony Music Malaysia. It is their first studio album in 12 years since KRUnomena (2013), following their reunion in October 2024 and their first album with Sony Music Malaysia. It is also their first album to included English tracks since 10 di Skala Richter (2006).

The overall sound of the album marks a return to the pop, rap and R&B style the group became famous for in the 1990s. Norman described it as "a collaborative effort, created as a family". The album yielded two lead singles, "Voodoo", released on 22 November 2024 and "One More Time", on 17 January 2025.

== Background and recording ==
Following their last concert, Gergasi KRU25 at Istana Budaya, Kuala Lumpur in May 2018, the KRU brothers Norman, Yusry and Edry decided to breakup and went hiatus to pursue their careers and personal lives individually. During this period, Norman focus on the group's business, while Yusry focus on his directorial career and Edry moved to Manchester, England.

On 10 October 2024, however, KRU announced that they would reunite for the first time and signed a contract with Sony Music Malaysia, awhile at the same time, they announced to release Kaset, their first official record in 12 years, scheduled for 2025 release and their upcoming concert. Prior to their reunion, the KRU brothers met the managements of Sony Music in April to discussed about the plan and convinced that the project "will be a big success". Norman said: "The three of us felt it is the right time for us to sit down and make some solid and good music together". The idea for Kaset came when Edry return to Malaysia from United Kingdom in 2024 and revisits some of unused KRU's demos. They initially decided to release a single with an AI-generated, however, the brothers changed their mind and release a full album instead. The album's recording process took six months to completed, which KRU described the process was different than before. The album title, Kaset, was chosen a tribute to the cassette era. Yusry said about the album's title: "We were born in the cassette era, and Kaset represents not just our journey, but also a tribute to the medium that first carried our music to the fans".

The concept for Kaset, according to KRU, will retain sounds from their glory days in the 1990s, but follows the present day popular music. The KRU brothers also revealed that their mother, Zarina Abdul Wahab Fenner is very happy to see them reunited together to record Kaset. Edry said that the recording process was done at their younger sister Halina's house, while disclosed that the album was intended to bringing back their wonderful nostalgia for their early days during the 1990s.

== Release and promotion ==
An exclusive fan launch for Kaset took place at the Dadi Cinema in Pavilion Kuala Lumpur on 23 April 2025, featuring a pre-listening session and personal interactions with the KRU brothers. A limited-edition physical formats of the album on CD and cassette, was released as a special tribute for a longtime KRU fans, with a total of 300 cassette copies and 3,000 CD copies for the album have been printed. The album was released on 25 April 2025. A limited edition vinyl of Kaset was released on 3 May.

== Singles ==
The first single of the album "Voodoo" was released on 22 November 2024. KRU revealed that the song is about an emotional journey of a man who intrigued with a women's mysterious charming. They also revealed that the song "holds a special place" in their hearts while maintaining their trademark pop, hip-hop and R&B sounds. A music video was produced to promote the single, which was directed by Suhaimi Yayanto. For the video, KRU utilised the artificial intelligence (AI) and become the first Malaysian artist to use AI in their music video. The single's music video depicts a prequel of fictional journey of the KRU brothers prior to the release of their debut album, Canggih in 1992.

The album's second single "One More Time" was released on 17 January 2025. According to KRU, the song revolves on a disappointment of a person who failed in love again and can only rejoice in sadness at seeing his/her ex-lover lived happily with someone else. A music video for the single were produced, also directed by Suhaimi. Like "Voodoo", the music video for "One More Time" also utilizes AI technology.

== Track listing ==
All tracks are written by Norman, Yusry and Edry Abdul Halim.

No.	Title	Length
1.	"Hambadansa"	4:07
2.	"One More Time"	3:25
3.	"Remaja Selamanya"	3:49
4.	"GOAT"	3:45
5.	"Selamat Hari Lahir"	3:02
6.	"Voodoo"	3:11
7.	"Sampai Sini Saja"	3:53
8.	"High Maintenance"	3:06
9.	"Ciptaan Sempurna"	3:36
10.	"Agung"	3:47
Total length:		35:45

== Personnel ==
Credits adapted from Kaset booklet liner notes.

- KRU – vocals, composer, lyrics
- Edry Abdul Halim – producer, arranger, mixer, mastering, MIDI, keys
- Nine – backing vocals
- Tina – backing vocals
- Bajai – arranger, MIDI, keys
- Donald Salman – arranger, MIDI, keys
- Denny – guitars
- Dave – guitars
- Jay Cugat – guitars
- Kecik – bass
- Faliq Auril – saxophone
- Farid Izwan – saxophone
- Firdaus Zainal – trumpet
- Felicia David – management
- Acmal Ibrahim – management
- 5ci5 Studio – recording studio
- White Room – recording studio
- The Verve – recording studio
- The Observatory, Manchester – mixing, mastering

Sony Music Malaysia team

- Kenny Ong – executive producer
- Ally Siw – senior director for marketing and domestic partnerships
- Veea Norman – digital marketing manager
- Fitrah Ilahi – marketing and promotion
- Chiang Sook Mian – marketing and promotion
- Umar – marketing and promotion
- Chan Mei Yee – creative marketing manager (new business)
- Aimeil Hiu – A&R manager
- Ferhad – A&R team
- Aiman Nuballah – senior manager for digital business and commercial
- Aieisha Helmy – digital sales and operations
- Mervin Moneira – digital sales and operations

== Release history ==
Region	Release date	Format	Label
Malaysia	25 April 2025	CD, cassette, Digital download	KRU Music, Sony Music Malaysia
