= KRUnomena =

Studio album by KRU
- Released: 31 January 2013
- Recorded: 2011–2013
- Studio: KRU Studios
- Genres: Pop; R&B
- Length: 41:21
- Label: KRU Music
- Producer: Edry Abdul Halim

KRU chronology
The Best of KRU (2012)	KRUnomena (2013)	1 (2015)

Singles from KRUnomena
- 1. "Ganas" Released: 2011; 2. "Tiga Kata" Released: 2011; 3. "Wanita" Released: 2012; 4. "Semalam Tanpamu" Released: 2013; 5. "Setiap" Released: 2013

KRUnomena is the thirteenth studio album by Malaysian boy band, KRU, released on 31 January 2013 by their own record label, KRU Music. It is their first studio album in 7 years since 10 di Skala Richter (2006), marking the longest gap between studio albums in KRU's career and it also is their only Malay-languaged album to not included any English songs.

== Production ==
After the release of 10 di Skala Richter in 2006, KRU decided to take a break from release any studio albums. During that period, they came up with more compilation albums. Five years later, they decided to return to studio and began recording new material for their forthcoming album.

The recording and production for KRUnomena began in 2011 and took two years to completed. The album's title is a portmanteau of KRU and 'fenomena' (lit. 'phenomenon'). According to KRU, the album was very special for them as it reflects maturity in their music and lyrics. Like KRUnisme and 10 di Skala Richter, Edry serves as the album's producer and composed nine out of 10 songs. "Tiga Kata", one of the songs in the album, had KRU included the phrase 'I Love You' in Chinese, Tamil, Korean and Japanese, while "Wanita" was specially dedicated to their mother, Zarina Abdul Wahab Fenner. "Kali Ke-2", the album's last track, is a remake of "2" from their 1995 soundtrack album, Awas! da Soundtrack.

KRUnomena would be KRU's first studio album produced by their own record label, KRU Music after having released 12 studio albums with EMI. United Studios, a company set up by KRU, handling the distribution for the album. It is also become their only album to included entirely songs in Malay and not included any English tracks. This was also KRU's last album before they disbanded in 2018 and before they reunited for the first time for Kaset (2025).

== Release and reception ==
KRUnomena was released on 31 January 2013 and become commercial success. Five singles were released from the album, including "Ganas", which released as a single in 2011, almost two years before the album, with an accompanying music video. Another single from the album, "Semalam Tanpamu" featuring Stacy, also received music videos.

== Track listing ==
All tracks are written by Edry Abdul Halim except where noted.

No.	Title	Writer(s)	Length
1.	"Setiap"		4:08
2.	"Semalam Tanpamu" (feat. Stacy)		3:52
3.	"Kesejatian Cinta"		4:00
4.	"Ganas" (Remix)		4:31
5.	"Separuh Mati"		4:27
6.	"Tiga Kata"		3:58
7.	"Sediakala"		4:10
8.	"Wanita"		4:10
9.	"Lagu Dan Lirik"		4:04
10.	"Kali Ke-2"	Norman Abdul Halim	4:27
Total length:			41:21

== Release history ==
Region	Release date	Format	Label
Malaysia	31 January 2013	CD, Digital download	KRU Music
