= Empayar KRUjaan V2.0 =

Studio album (reissue) by KRU
- Released: 26 October 2002
- Recorded: 2002
- Studio: KRU Studios
- Genres: Pop; Hip-hop; R&B; dance; electronic
- Length: 55:26
- Label: EMI Music Malaysia
- Producer: KRU

KRU chronology
| KRUjaan (2002) | Empayar KRUjaan V2.0 (2002) | Relax (2004) |

Singles from Empayar KRUjaan V2.0
- 1. "Perpisahan Terasing" Released: 2002; 2. "U Got Style" Released: 2002

Empayar KRUjaan V2.0 is the tenth studio album by Malaysian boy band KRU, released on 26 October 2002 by EMI Music Malaysia. It is a reissue version of their ninth studio album KRUjaan, that combines new material with the remixed versions of all the original tracks and bonus materials.

== Production ==
After the release of their ninth album, KRUjaan in May 2002, which they realized that it received lukewarm success, the KRU brothers decided to repackage the album with new composition.

The album introduced four new tracks: "Perpisahan Terasing", which combines two classic songs, "Perpisahan" by The Revolvers and "Terasing" by Sudirman Arshad, "Hidup Hidup Ditipu", which is a remake of Hidup Hidup Dibakar, originally performed by Malaysian rock band, Dr. Kronik, one of artists under KRU's record label, KRU Music Group, "Ampuniku" and "U Got Style".

In addition, the album features an improved version of "Amaran KRUjaan" and the inclusion of "Monte Carlo Reprise", originally by performed by Phyne Ballerz, which was initially intended for the KRUjaan album.

== Track listing ==
All tracks are written by Norman, Yusry and Edry Abdul Halim except where noted.

| No. | Title | Writer(s) | Length |
|---|---|---|---|
| 1. | "Amaran KRUjaan" | | 0:24 |
| 2. | "U Got Style" | | 3:56 |
| 3. | "Impak Maksima" | | 4:14 |
| 4. | "Perpisahan Terasing" | Freddie Fernandez; Manan Ngah; Anuar Razak; Habsah Hassan | 3:43 |
| 5. | "Mahaguru" | | 4:39 |
| 6. | "Ampuniku" | | 4:13 |
| 7. | "Bintang Popular" | | 3:50 |
| 8. | "Hidup-Hidup Ditipu" | | 4:04 |
| 9. | "Ucapkanlah" | | 4:39 |
| 10. | "The Belly Dance" | | 4:06 |
| 11. | "I Am" | | 3:03 |
| 12. | "Ikhtiar" | | 3:53 |
| 13. | "Monte Carlo Reprise" | | 0:31 |
| 14. | "Aku Benci" | | 4:00 |
| 15. | "Penganggur Profesional" | | 4:08 |
| 16. | "Pintasan" | | 0:32 |
| 17. | "Sayang" | | 4:20 |
| Total length: | | | 55:26 |

== Release and reception ==
The album was released on 26 October 2002, about five months after the release of KRUjaan, concurrently with the Konsert Empayar KRUjaan, which was held at the Dataran Merdeka, Kuala Lumpur. "Perpisahan Terasing" was released as the lead singles, with an accompanying music video. "U Got Style" also was released as singles and received much airplay from Hitz.fm and Traxx FM.

Writing for the New Straits Times, Zainal Alam Kadir felt that the album is "value-for-money".
