= Never Let the Spirit Die =

Single by KRU
- Released: 4 August 1998
- Recorded: June 1998
- Studio: KRU Studios, Kuala Lumpur
- Genre: R&B, ballad
- Length: 4:25
- Label: KRU Records
- Songwriter: KRU
- Producer: KRU

KRU singles chronology
"Getaran Jiwa" (1997)	"Never Let the Spirit Die" (1998)	"Fobia" (1998)

Audio sample
- file; help

Music video
- "Never Let the Spirit Die" on YouTube

"Never Let the Spirit Die" is a song by Malaysian boy band, KRU, released as one of the official anthem of the 1998 Commonwealth Games. It was written and produced by the KRU brothers themselves. To promote the single and its accompanying music video, an interactive CD-ROM was released in September in conjunction with the KRU and Pepsi collaboration.

== Background and recording ==
The idea for the song came in March 1998. They initially to included the song in their debut English album, The Way We Jam, but didn't make the final cut. According to the KRU brothers, it was specially written and produced for the 1998 Commonwealth Games in which they intended to show their support for the games. They felt that since there are many songs produced for the games, they never though that the song "could be a big thing" until Pepsi approached them in early August the same year.

Recording of "Never Let the Spirit Die" began in June 1998 and is originally recorded only in R&B ballad version at their own studio in Kuala Lumpur. KRU produced the song with Yusry serves as the programmer and Edry serves as the engineer. For the Fiesta Mix version of the song, they decided to extract the main vocals from the R&B track and done from "layer to layer" with the new arrangement. Yusry said that the song's reprogramming took three hours to get the best results.

== Composition ==
The track is four minutes and twentyfive seconds long for the original version, written and composed by the brothers themselves. KRU revealed that the song's lyrics is about how one should always be part of the one's achievements, so that he/she has given their best attempt in their effort to achieving success.

== Release and promotion ==
"Never Let the Spirit Die" was released on 4 August 1998 as one of the official anthem of the 16th Commonwealth Games, which was held from 11 to 21 September 1998. An interactive CD-ROM of the song was exclusively printed for 10,000 copies in a special CD that contains information, behind the scenes, music videos, ads and the song itself, and was released in September. The song didn't included on an album until 6 years later, when it selected for inclusion on KRU's 2004 compilation album, Relax.

The group perform the song at the Konsert Suria Merdeka at the KLCC Park on 29 August 1998 and at the closing ceremony of the 16th Commonwealth Games on 21 September.

== Music video ==
The song's accompanying music video was directed by Norman, one of the KRU brothers. They initially had a difficulties to choose which version to be used for the video either the R&B version as it brings a "sentimental spiritually uplifting emotion" or the Fiesta Mix version as it broughts a "jovial and exciting move" to the games. In the end, they decided to combine both R&B and Fiesta Mix versions into one to make the video "unique in terms of contrast and move". The KRU brothers also changed the storyline, which initially displayed the slower artistic movement and then the fire. The music video for "Never Let the Spirit Die" took place at the same set they filmed a Pepsi commercial. An additional set was used for the video.

The video starts with the KRU brothers sitting at a chair covered with white cloth and watching a few athletes participated in the 16th Commonwealth Games. Later, they standing at the front of the torches, accompanied by the photos of athletes at the games displayed behind them. A fire was lit at the torches in front of them, followed by coloured lamps lit behind the brothers. The video ends with a quote from KRU, which writes "Cause every heart will win, so let the games begin...".

== Track listing ==
No.	Title	Length
1.	"Never Let the Spirit Die" (Original version)	4:25
2.	"Never Let the Spirit Die" (Fiesta Mix)	4:17
Total length:		8:42

== Credits and personnel ==
Credits adapted from the single's liner notes and behind the scenes.

Song

- KRU – vocals, composer, producer
- Yusry Abdul Halim – programmer
- Edry Abdul Halim – engineer

Music video

- Norman Abdul Halim – director
- Abdul Halim Kamal – executive producer
- Zarina Abdul Wahab Fenner – executive producer
- Johan Lucas – assistant director, editor
- KRU Motion Pictures – camera unit, post production unit
- Mustapha Kamal – production manager
- Bakhtiar Bolak – cameramen
- Kamarul Arif Jamaluddin – director of photography
- Nasrom – 2nd camera
- Zakaria Tarzan – production crew
- Zakaria Mohd – production crew
- Bill Keith – stylist
- Karim Kilt – editor
- Noor Yusnita – artiste manager

== Release history ==
Country	Date	Format(s)	Label	Ref.
Malaysia	4 August 1998	CD single	KRU Records	
