= Voodoo (KRU song) =

Single by KRU

from the album Kaset
- Released: 22 November 2024
- Recorded: October 2024
- Genre: Pop
- Length: 3:11
- Label: KRU Music; Sony Music Malaysia
- Songwriter: KRU
- Producer: Edry Abdul Halim

KRU singles chronology
"Tahan Lama" (2018)	"Voodoo" (2024)	"One More Time" (2025)

Music video
- "Voodoo" on YouTube

"Voodoo" is a song by Malaysian boy band, KRU, which was released on 22 November 2024 as the lead single from their fourteenth studio album, Kaset. It is their first official single release in six years since they disbanded in 2018 and reunited in 2024. The song was written by the KRU brothers and produced by Edry Abdul Halim. To promote the song as a single, a music video was filmed using the artificial intelligence (AI) and directed by Suhaimi Yayanto.

== Background and release ==
On 10 October 2024, KRU reunited after six years of hiatus and signed with Sony Music Malaysia. Concurrently, they announced that they will be releasing their new album titled Kaset. On 22 November, KRU selected "Voodoo" as their first single from their upcoming album.

== Composition ==
The track is three minutes and eleventh seconds long, written and composed by the brothers themselves. The experimental love song, produced by Edry Abdul Halim, is about an emotional journey of a man who intrigued with a women's mysterious charming. KRU revealed that the song "holds a special place" in their hearts while maintaining their trademark pop, hip-hop and R&B sounds they used to famous for in the 1990s.

== Music video ==
The music video of "Voodoo" was directed by Suhaimi Yayanto and produced by Edry. KRU utilised the artificial intelligence (AI) for the video and become the first Malaysian artist to use AI in their music video. The video depicts a prequel of fictional journey of the KRU brothers prior to the release of their debut album, Canggih in 1992.

== Credits and personnel ==
Song

Credits adapted from Kaset booklet liner notes.

- KRU – vocals, composer, lyrics
- Edry Abdul Halim – producer, arranger, mixer, mastering
- The Observatory, Manchester – mastering engineer, mixing engineer

Music video

- Suhaimi Yayanto – director
- Edry Abdul Halim – producer
- Yusry Abdul Halim – visual effects director, graphic design
- Miera Muttalib – project manager
- Zalinda Natasha – assistant project manager
- Luqman Hakim – director of photography, editor
- Aliff Nasyraff – 2nd unit
- Alisya – 1st assistant camera
- Zulhaily – 2nd assistant camera
- Anis Farisya – behind the scenes
- Amirul – G&E
- Azmi – G&E
- Azman – G&E
- Syed – G&E

== Format and track listing ==
- Digital download
1. "Voodoo" – 3:11

== Release history ==
Country	Date	Format	Label
Malaysia	22 November 2024	Digital download; streaming	KRU Music; Sony Music Malaysia
