= Fanatik (song) =

Single by KRU

from the album KRUmania
- Released: 28 February 1997
- Studio: KRU Studios
- Genre: Pop
- Length: 3:54
- Label: EMI Music Malaysia
- Songwriter: KRU
- Producer: KRU

KRU singles chronology
"Semuanya OK!" (1996)	"Fanatik" (1997)	"Getaran Jiwa" (1997)

Music video
- "Fanatik" on YouTube

"Fanatik" ("Fanatic") is a song by Malaysian boy band KRU, which was released on 28 February 1997 as the lead single from their debut compilation album, KRUmania. It was written and produced by the KRU brothers themselves. A music video was filmed to promote the single, directed by Saw Teong Hin.

== Composition ==
The track is three minutes and fifteen fifth seconds long, written, composed and produced by the KRU brothers themselves. According to Norman, the song is to remind youths "not to be hypocrites, but to be more open-minded".

== Commercial performance ==
"Fanatik" debuted and peaked at number 4 in the Radio Muzik's Most Popular Malay Songs chart. It spent 10 weeks in the Top 10.

== Music video ==
The music video for "Fanatik" was produced by Renaissance Films and directed by Saw Teong Hin with Lina Tan serves as the producer. The video's production costed a total of RM80,000 to RM100,000 and became KRU's most expensive music videos to date. It is one of the two music videos from KRUmania directed by Teong Hin, the other being "Getaran Jiwa".

== Track listing ==
Track listing taken from the song's promo sampler.

No.	Title	Length
1.	"Fanatik"	3:55
2.	"Maniamedley"	4:05
3.	"Awas!"	4:27
4.	"Mengerti"	5:09
5.	"Negatif"	3:54
Total length:		23:40

== Personnel ==
KRU

- Norman Abdul Halim – rap, producer
- Yusry Abdul Halim – vocals, producer
- Edry Abdul Halim – vocals, producer

Additional musicians

- DanceKRU – backing vocals
- Indigo – backing vocals
- Elite – backing vocals

Music video

- Saw Teong Hin – director
- Lina Tan – producer
- William Woo – editing
- Phillip Timm – editing
- Chin Chen Fong – photography
- Renaissance Films – production

== Cover versions ==
Malaysian rock band, Dr. Kronik recorded the song in rock and nu-metal version in 2002 and included in Wa Caya KRU, a compilation album contains KRU's popular hits covered by artists under KRU Music Group. Like the original version performed by KRU, the song's rock version is much well-received by music enthusiasts and received heavy airplay on Malaysian radio stations.

== Awards and nominations ==
Award(s)	Year	Recipient(s)	Nominated work(s)	Category	Result	Ref(s)
Anugerah Industri Muzik	1998	KRU	"Fanatik"	Best Music Video	Won	
Anugerah Industri Muzik	1998	KRU	"Fanatik"	Best Music Arrangement in a Song	Nominated	
Malaysian Music Video Awards	1997	KRU	"Fanatik"	Best Music Video	Won	
Malaysian Music Video Awards	1997	KRU	"Fanatik"	Best Performance	Won	
MTV Video Music Awards	1997	KRU	"Fanatik"	International Viewer's Choice	Nominated	

== Release history ==
Country	Date	Format(s)	Label	Ref.
Malaysia	28 February 1997	CD single, promo sampler	KRU Records, EMI Music Malaysia	
