= Kaset Green Hawk =

Thai aerial display team

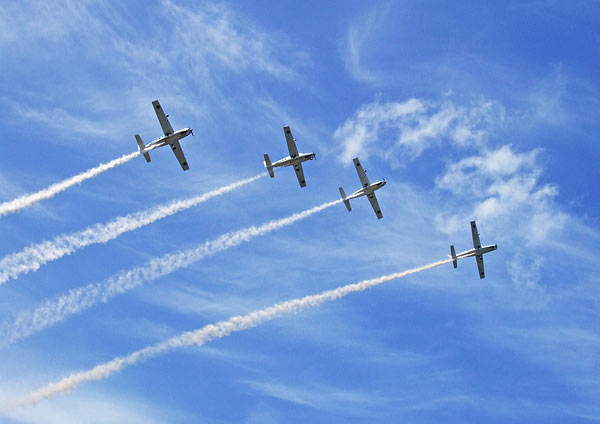
- Green Hawk in SAREX 2008.
- Active: 2007–present
- Country: Thailand
- Branch: Bureau of Royal Rainmaking and Agricultural Aviation
- Role: Display
- Size: 4 to 9 aircraft
- Colors: Green and white

Aircraft flown
- Transport: 4 to 9 Cessna 208

Kaset Green Hawk is an aerial display team of the Bureau of Royal Rainmaking and Agricultural Aviation (KASET) of Thailand formed from rainmaking aircraft and crews.
