= 10 di Skala Richter =

Studio album by KRU
- Released: July 2006
- Recorded: 2005–2006
- Studio: KRU Studios
- Genres: Pop; Hip-hop
- Length: 37:15
- Label: EMI Music Malaysia
- Producer: Edry Abdul Halim

KRU chronology
| KRUnisme (2005) | 10 di Skala Richter (2006) | Ultimatum (2010) |

Singles from 10 di Skala Richter
- 1. "Gerenti Beres" Released: April 2006; 2. "C'mon Lah" Released: 2006; 3. "Buat Hal Lagi" Released: 2006

10 di Skala Richter (10 on the Richter Scale) is the twelfth studio album by Malaysian boy band, KRU. It was released on July 2006 by EMI Music Malaysia.

== Production ==
After the release of KRUnisme (2005), KRU return to studio and began recording new material for what went on to become 10 di Skala Richter in late 2005. Like KRUnisme, Edry also become the album's producer and composed all 10 tracks in the album.

"Buat Hal Lagi", one of the songs recorded for the album, featuring The Hit Squad, a collective consists of artists under KRU Music Adam Mat Saman and BillyZulkarnain as well the then-Era radio presenter, Linda Onn, while "Ya Habibati" ("Oh, My Beloved") had the KRU brothers singing in both Malay and Arabic. 10 di Skala Richter would be the last album KRU released with EMI Music Malaysia as their 15-year contract with EMI ended in January 2007. The KRU brothers would not record another studio album until KRUnomena, seven years later, in 2013.

== Release and reception ==
10 di Skala Richter was released in July 2006 to popular success. Music videos were produced for "Gerenti Beres" and "C'mon Lah", two of the album's three lead singles.

Ellyna Ali, writing for Harian Metro described the album as "full with experimentation along with creative ideas".

== Track listing ==
All tracks are written by Edry Abdul Halim.

| No. | Title | Length |
|---|---|---|
| 1. | "Buat Hal Lagi" (featuring The Hit Squad) | 3:53 |
| 2. | "Gerenti Beres" | 3:53 |
| 3. | "Lagu Untuk Mamat" | 3:37 |
| 4. | "(Kena Marah Pun) Tak Kisah" | 4:10 |
| 5. | "La-Di-Da La-Di-Da" | 3:53 |
| 6. | "C'mon Lah" | 3:49 |
| 7. | "Sehari Dalam Hidup" | 2:34 |
| 8. | "Hot Gal" | 3:53 |
| 9. | "Drama" | 3:47 |
| 10. | "Ya Habibati" | 4:22 |
| Total length: | | 37:15 |

== Release history ==
| Region | Release date | Format | Label |
|---|---|---|---|
| Malaysia | July 2006 | CD, Digital download | EMI Music Malaysia |
