= One More Time (KRU song) =

Single by KRU

from the album Kaset
- Released: 17 January 2025
- Recorded: December 2024
- Genre: Pop
- Length: 3:25
- Label: KRU Music; Sony Music Malaysia
- Songwriter: KRU
- Producer: KRU

KRU singles chronology
"Voodoo" (2024)	"One More Time" (2025)

Music video
- "One More Time" on YouTube

"One More Time" is a song by Malaysian boy band, KRU, which was released on 17 January 2025 as the second single from their fourteenth studio album, Kaset. The song was written by the KRU brothers and produced by Edry Abdul Halim. A music video was filmed using artificial intelligence to promote the single, also directed by Suhaimi Yayanto.

== Background and release ==
"One More Time" was one of two singles released by KRU for their fourteenth album, Kaset. The single was released on 17 January 2025.

== Composition ==
The track is three minutes and twentyfifth seconds long, written and composed by the brothers themselves. The motivational track, produced by Edry Abdul Halim, is about a disappointment of a person who failed in love again and can only rejoice in sadness at seeing his/her ex-lover lived happily with someone else.

== Music video ==
The music video of "One More Time" was directed by Suhaimi Yayanto (who previously directed "Voodoo" music video) and produced by Edry. Like "Voodoo", KRU also utilised the artificial intelligence (AI) to create digital twins for the video, which showcasing KRU's transformation from different eras.

== Credits and personnel ==
Song

Credits adapted from Kaset booklet liner notes.

- KRU – vocals, composer, lyrics
- Edry Abdul Halim – producer, arranger, mixer, mastering, MIDI, keys
- Faliq Auri – saxophone
- Kecik – bass
- Donald Saimon – arranger
- Nine – vocal coach
- The Observatory, Manchester – mastering engineer, mixing engineer

Music video

- Suhaimi Yayanto – director
- Atmin Mazid – assistant director
- Luqman Hakim – director of photography
- Aliff Nasyraff – assistant director
- Yusry Abdul Halim – post visual FX
- Miera Muttalib – project manager
- Zalinda Natasha – assistant project manager
- Anis Farisya – behind the scenes
- Izzaidi Ismail – G&E
- Fakhrul Amin – G&E
- Azmie Sulaiman – G&E
- Aswad – art department
- Annie – art department
- Asyraf – art department
- Noliya – wardrobe
- Norhaniza – MUA
- Shaim – hairstylist

== Format and track listing ==
- Digital download
1. "One More Time" – 3:25

== Release history ==
Country	Date	Format	Label
Malaysia	17 January 2025	Digital download; streaming	KRU Music; Sony Music Malaysia
