= KRUjaan =

Studio album by KRU
- Released: 16 May 2002
- Recorded: 2001–2002
- Studio: KRU Studios
- Genres: Pop; Hip-hop; R&B; dance; electronic
- Length: 41:26
- Label: EMI Music Malaysia
- Producer: KRU

KRU chronology
Tyco (2000)	KRUjaan (2002)	Empayar KRUjaan V2.0 (2002)

Singles from KRUjaan
- 1. "Impak Maksima" Released: 10 April 2002; 2. "Aku Benci" Released: 2002; 3. "Mahaguru" Released: 2002; 4. "Ucapkanlah" Released: 2002; 5. "Sayang" Released: 2003; 6. "Bintang Popular" Released: 2003

KRUjaan is the ninth studio album by Malaysian boy band, KRU. It was released on 16 May 2002 by EMI Music Malaysia. Six singles were released from the album, with "Impak Maksima" released as the lead single.

== Production ==
After came up with Malaysia's first virtual band, Tyco and its self-titled debut album in 2000, KRU began working on new material for KRUjaan, which was scheduled for 2002 release as part of their 10th anniversary celebration. For the album, KRU transitioned to electronic and disco, and took the 'hiptronic' concept, while maintain their hip-hop and R&B sounds.

The KRU brothers approached Erra Fazira to be Yusry's duet partner for "Ucapkanlah" and according to them, they chose Erra for her gentle voice. Although Erra was surprised to be her soon-to-be husband's duet partner and was under contract with Sony Music Malaysia, she accepted the offer. The album was recorded at their own recording studio in Kuala Lumpur. Like their previous albums, KRU also recorded English tracks for the album. The arrangement and mixing was handled by KRU, with Yusry and Edry serves as a MIDI controller. The mastering process was done by Edry, who also serves as the album's engineer.

== Track listing ==
All tracks are written by Norman, Yusry and Edry Abdul Halim.

No.	Title	Length
1.	"Amaran KRUjaan"	0:24
2.	"Impak Maksima"	4:12
3.	"Aku Benci"	4:02
4.	"Mahaguru"	4:26
5.	"The Belly Dance"	4:06
6.	"Ikhtiar"	3:49
7.	"Sayang"	3:51
8.	"Bintang Popular"	3:51
9.	"I Am"	3:14
10.	"Penganggur Profesional"	4:09
11.	"Ucapan KRU"	0:33
12.	"Ucapkanlah" (feat. Erra Fazira)	4:43
Total length:		41:26

== Release and reception ==
KRUjaan was released on 16 May 2002 in conjunction with KRU's 10th anniversary of their music career. Six singles were released from the album, including the first single, "Impak Maksima", which was released earlier. The music video for "Impak Maksima" was filmed for three days in Bukit Bintang and Brickfields, while its filming budget was at RM80,000. To promote the album, KRU embarked on a two-hour mobile concert, which was held on 18 May.

Zainal Alam Kadir, writing for the New Straits Times said the album has "come up with simple sounds and ordinary melodies". Jad Mahidin from Sunday Mail also praised the album and give three out of five stars. Although the album was well received, however, "Impak Maksima" was poorly received, with Ellyna Ali from Berita Minggu wrote that KRU's vocals in "Impak Maksima" are "not really strong enough in the album". Wahti Mahidin, also from the New Straits Times wrote, "There was no melody to speak of and the chorus could have come from just about any KRU song from the past and, dare it be assumed, the future?".

A repackaged edition of the album, Empayar KRUjaan V2.0 was released on 26 October 2002, five months after KRUjaan was released. The album contains four new songs, including "U Got Style" and a cover version of Revolver's "Perpisahan" and Sudirman Arshad's "Terasing", which KRU re-recorded as "Perpisahan Terasing".

== Release history ==
Region	Release date	Format	Label
Malaysia	16 May 2002	CD, Digital download	EMI Music Malaysia
