= The Way We Jam =

Studio album by KRU
- Released: 26 November 1998
- Recorded: 1995 – 1998
- Studios: 21 A Studio; Synchrosound Studio; The Backroom
- Genres: Pop; Hip-hop; R&B
- Length: 59:46
- Label: EMI Music Malaysia
- Producer: KRU

KRU chronology
KRUmania (1997)	The Way We Jam (1998)	Formula Luarbiasa (1999)

Singles from The Way We Jam
- 1. "The Way We Jam" Released: 12 November 1998; 2. "For You" Released: March 1999; 3. "More Than Forever" Released: August 1999

The Way We Jam is the sixth studio album by Malaysian boy band, KRU. It was released on 26 November 1998 by EMI Music Malaysia. It is their first and only English-languaged album and also their first album to not included interludes. The album won the Best Engineered Album at the 1999 Anugerah Industri Muzik.

== Production ==
The idea for The Way We Jam came when the KRU brothers made their trip to Los Angeles, United States in 1995 and that's when they began to lobbying for songs from renowned composers there. While in Los Angeles, they get to know people in the music industry there, which consists of "engineers, production co-ordinators and people behind the scene". Prior to The Way We Jam, the group had recorded some English tracks in their previous albums.

By then, KRU get in touch with their contacts in Los Angeles and sending them their albums. Although the brothers did not have a chance to meet these composers personally, except for London Jones, some of their contacts have the songs ready for them. According to Norman, the recording process for the album took a longer period to completed: "We don't want the [upcoming] album to be released in a hurry and just kept in stores and become outdated". Out of the 20 songs submitted to them, 14 of them make the final cut. Singer-songwriter Babyface composed and wrote "Sweet November" for the album, which Norman said that working with Babyface is not easy, admitted that "he [Babyface] rarely into the crowds". Award-winning composer, Diane Warren contributed "More Than Forever", which he commented, "when Diane Warren gave us two of her songs, we asked her to gave other song as it is unlike what we want".

KRU also re-recorded "You Can Never Ask Too Much (of Love)" composed by David Foster and originally performed by American gospel music group, Take 6, which they shortened the song title as "Never Ask Too Much (of Love)". "Wanita Jelita" is the only song in the album to bearing the title in Bahasa Malaysia with lyrics written entirely in English. The brothers stated that their dream to working with renowned American composers and producers was fulfilled. For The Way We Jam, KRU incorporates entirely R&B, with a blend of dance and rap music. "Never Let the Spirit Die" was originally intended to be part of the album, but didn't make the final cut. KRU said the song was not included in The Way We Jam as it didn't meet standards unless it requires some revisions. Due to the deadline, the song was eventually dropped from the album. The album recorded at three different recording studios, 21 A Studio in Kuala Lumpur; Synchrosound Studio in Petaling Jaya and The Backroom in Los Angeles, while the mastering process was done by Don Bartley at the Studios 301 in Sydney, Australia.

== Track listing ==
All tracks are written by Norman, Yusry and Edry Abdul Halim except where noted.

No.	Title	Writer(s)	Length
1.	"The Way We Jam"		3:58
2.	"Every Single Minute"		3:38
3.	"More Than Forever"	Diane Warren	4:57
4.	"Leave That Girl Alone"	Sean Hall; Thabiso Nkhereanye; Christopher Stewart	3:58
5.	"For You"	Dwight Sills; London Jones	3:49
6.	"Why Must I Feel Like That"	David Spradley; Dicky Antoine; Erick Sermon; Garry Shider; George Clinton; Larry Troutman; Leon Sylvers; Markell Riley; Roger Troutman; Teddy Riley	4:42
7.	"Never Ask Too Much (of Love)"	Cedric Dent; David Foster; Linda Thompson	4:19
8.	"Do My Thang (Upside Down)"		3:31
9.	"Tribe"		3:47
10.	"Won't Look Back"		4:36
11.	"The D"		3:49
12.	"Out of My Mind"		5:02
13.	"Wanita Jelita"		4:25
14.	"Sweet November"	Babyface	4:48
Total length:			59:46

== Release and reception ==
The Way We Jam was released on 26 November 1998. Three music videos were produced for the album, for the title track, "For You" and "More Than Forever". KRU said the music video for "The Way We Jam" explicitly depicts their music and the multi-ethnic Malaysia. For the video, KRU uses 30 talents from Malaysia, Australia, New Zealand and Nigeria to represent their fans from different cultural backgrounds. The album's first single, "The Way We Jam" was well received in the Philippines and entered two music charts there, toppled "...Baby One More Time" by Britney Spears and "So Young" by The Corrs, while its second single, "For You", entered charts in few Asian countries.

The album was well received, earning KRU a Best Engineered Album for the album and a Best Music Video for the title track at the 6th Anugerah Industri Muzik on 10 April 1999. To promote the album, KRU held a promotional tour of The Way We Jam in three locations in Malaysia, including Penang. Sani Salleh from Harian Metro described the album as a "symbol of the brothers' musical evolution".

They also promote the album as part of their first Asian tour, Jammin' the Nation, where they perform 9 out of 14 songs in The Way We Jam.

== Charts ==
Chart (1998–1999)	Peak position
International Albums Chart	2

== Release history ==
Region	Release date	Format	Label
Malaysia	26 November 1998	CD, Digital download	EMI Music Malaysia
