= KRUnisme =

Studio album by KRU
- Released: 1 January 2005
- Recorded: 2003–2004
- Studio: KRU Studios
- Genres: Pop; Hip-hop
- Length: 44:01
- Label: EMI Music Malaysia
- Producer: Edry Abdul Halim

KRU chronology
Relax (2004)	KRUnisme (2005)	10 di Skala Richter (2006)

Singles from KRUnisme
- 1. "Terhangat di Pasaran" Released: 8 October 2004; 2. "Empat Syarat" Released: 2005; 3. "Sampai" Released: 2005; 4. "Berat" Released: 2006

KRUnisme is the eleventh studio album by Malaysian boy band, KRU. It was released on 1 January 2005 by EMI Music Malaysia.

== Production ==
Following the critical and commercial success of their previous albums, KRU announced that they will be releasing their new album on the New Year's Day 2005. The album was then announced as being titled KRUnisme, in which according to the brothers, is their life diary throughout their illustrious music career. Edry, one of the KRU brothers, become the album's producer and composed and wrote the lyrics for all 10 songs in the album.

== Track listing ==
All tracks are written by Edry Abdul Halim.

No.	Title	Length
1.	"Selamat Datang"	1:21
2.	"Terhangat Di Pasaran" (feat. Adam AF2)	3:56
3.	"Berat"	3:50
4.	"Sampai"	4:16
5.	"Seksa"	3:43
6.	"Sempurna"	4:56
7.	"Rock It!"	3:44
8.	"Empat Syarat"	3:53
9.	"Peminat #1"	3:25
10.	"My Evil Twin"	3:53
11.	"Masih Bersama"	3:27
12.	"Jumpa Lagi"	3:37
Total length:		44:01

== Release and reception ==
KRUnisme was released on 1 January 2005. "Terhangat di Pasaran" featuring Sabahan singer, Adam Mat Saman, was released as the album's lead single. A music video, which is inspired by reality television shows, was produced to promote the single.

== Release history ==
Region	Release date	Format	Label
Malaysia	1 January 2005	CD, Digital download	EMI Music Malaysia
