= Awas! =

Studio album / EP by KRU
- Released: September 1994
- Recorded: January – June 1994
- Studios: KRU Mini Studio; Channel 11 Studio
- Genres: Pop; Hip-hop; R&B
- Length: 32:37
- Label: EMI Music Malaysia
- Producer: KRU

KRU chronology
reKRUed (1993)	Awas! (1994)	Awas! da' Soundtrack (1995)

Singles from Awas!
- 1. "Awas!" Released: June 1994; 2. "Untukmu" Released: October 1994

Awas! (Danger!) is the third studio album by Malaysian boy band, KRU, released in September 1994 by EMI Music Malaysia. Released as an extended play (EP), the album was sold 60,000 copies and certified double-platinum.

== Recording and release ==
"Awas!" (1994)
"Awas!" was KRU's most successful single, with lyrics inspired by signboards and related to homewreckers.

Awas! was recorded primarily at the KRU's mini studio and Channel 11 Studio, with the KRU brothers served as producer and handling mixing and arrangements. For the album, KRU decided to make Awas! as an EP, which they described it as a continuation of their second album, reKRUed and their forthcoming acting debut in the 1995 film of the same name. KRU said it is a necessary to release the album as a "time gap filler".

"Awas!", "E'nuff Eez E'nuff" and "Di Dalam Dilema" included as a new songs, while the other three were the new version of "Janji Tinggal Janji" and a live version of "Mengerti" (original versions of both songs included in reKRUed) as well as "Untukmu", which was made famous by Malaysian girl group Feminin. For the latter, KRU sing in a cappella version. The mastering process was done by Bernie Grundman at his own studio, Bernie Grundman Mastering in Hollywood, California, United States.

The album was released on September 1994 to popular success. "Awas!" and "Untukmu" was released as its lead single. In a separate interview with Utusan Malaysia and Harian Metro in 2025, Norman revealed that "Awas!" was inspired by signboards and related to homewreckers: "[It's] about a female artist we were once admire due to her beauty. But what was disappointed us was when the female artist chose an older man as her boyfriend. We made that story into a song". Awas! was well received upon its release and sold over 60,000 copies and being certified double-platinum. It also earned KRU the Best Vocal Performance in an Album (Group) category at the second Anugerah Industri Muzik in 1995. It's follow up album, Awas! da' Soundtrack was released on 15 June 1995 as a soundtrack for the 1995 film, Awas!, which the KRU brothers played the lead roles.

== Track listing ==
All tracks are written by Norman, Yusry and Edry Abdul Halim.

No.	Title	Length
1.	"Awas!"	4:32
2.	"Di Dalam Dilema"	4:29
3.	"Untukmu"	3:45
4.	"E'nuff Eez E'nuff"	3:27
5.	"Mengerti" (Live at the Life Centre, KL)	5:06
6.	"Janji Tinggal Janji" (new version)	5:29
7.	"Janji Tinggal Janji" (Saxational)	5:26
Total length:		32:37

== Certifications ==
Region	Certification	Certified units/sales
Malaysia	2× Platinum	60,000

== Release history ==
Region	Release date	Format	Label
Malaysia	September 1994	CD, Digital download	EMI Music Malaysia

== Works cited ==
- KRU (1994). AWAS! [DANGER!] (in Malay). Kuala Lumpur: Kharisma Publications.
