= Formula Luarbiasa =

Studio album by KRU
- Released: 16 December 1999
- Recorded: 1999
- Studios: Synchrosound Studio; KRU Studios
- Genres: Pop; Hip-hop; R&B
- Length: 42:17
- Label: EMI Music Malaysia
- Producer: KRU

KRU chronology
The Way We Jam (1998)	Formula Luarbiasa (1999)	Ideologi KRU (2000)

Singles from Formula Luarbiasa
- 1. "Luar Biasa" Released: August 1999; 2. "Formula" Released: October 1999; 3. "Jangan Lafazkan" Released: 13 December 1999

Formula Luarbiasa (Extraordinary Formula) is the seventh studio album by Malaysian boy band, KRU. It was released on 16 December 1999 by EMI Music Malaysia.

== Production ==
Following the success of their previous albums, KRU began working on what was to become Formula Luarbiasa in early 1999. "Penjunjung Namaku", the final track in the album, was written and produced by KRU and specially dedicated for parents. The cover art photography for the album features a three baby boys, which represents the KRU brothers.

== Track listing ==
All tracks are written by Norman, Yusry and Edry Abdul Halim.

No.	Title	Length
1.	"Revolusi Evolusi"	0:34
2.	"Hilang Kawalan"	4:13
3.	"Jangan Lafazkan"	4:51
4.	"Luar Biasa"	3:48
5.	"I'll Make You Famous"	3:51
6.	"Pengumuman Penting"	0:19
7.	"Deja Vu"	3:26
8.	"Formula"	4:05
9.	"What If She Knew"	3:57
10.	"Puteri Kayangan"	3:17
11.	"Luar Biasa Demo"	1:08
12.	"Teka-Teki"	4:03
13.	"Penjunjung Namaku"	4:38
Total length:		42:17

== Release and reception ==
Formula Luarbiasa was released on 16 December 1999. Three singles were released from the album: "Luar Biasa", "Formula" and "Jangan Lafazkan". The first single, "Luar Biasa" was launched in August 1999 with the limited copies of its CD single, contains four versions of the song, have been sold out. It also was chosen as the theme song for Perodua, while its second single, "Formula" was launched via a video conference. To promote the album, KRU utilised an airplane to carrying the album's banner.

The album was well-received and sold more than 30,000 copies within the first two months. Writing for the New Straits Times, Zainal Alam Kadir wrote the album "has everything, from catchy lyrics to substantial melodies, infectious rhythms and solid attitudes" and "has a charm of the funky disco of the 70s and 80s mixed with contemporary pop". He added that the album "has maturity and interesting experiments that could win the band more adult support".

== Charts ==
Chart (1999–2000)	Peak position
Malaysian Albums Chart	1

== Release history ==
Region	Release date	Format	Label
Malaysia	16 December 1999	CD, Digital download	EMI Music Malaysia
