= ReKRUed =

reKRUed

Studio album by KRU
- Released: October 1993
- Recorded: 1992 – 1993
- Studio: Channel 11 Studio
- Genres: Pop; Hip-hop
- Length: 67:25
- Label: EMI Music Malaysia
- Producer: KRU

KRU chronology
Canggih (1992)	reKRUed (1993)	Awas! (1994)

Singles from reKRUed
- 1. "Mengerti" Released: 1993; 2. "Janji Tinggal Janji" Released: 1993

reKRUed is the second studio album by Malaysian boy band, KRU. It was released in October 1993 by EMI Music Malaysia.

== Production ==
After the success of their debut album, Canggih (1992), KRU began working on their second album. The album took eight months to completed. Like the first album, all songs in reKRUed were composed by the brothers themselves. KRU described the album is "more mature" than Canggih as they "wanted to have something that was different and good at the same time".

== Track listing ==
All tracks are written by Norman, Yusry and Edry Abdul Halim.

No.	Title	Length
1.	"Mengerti"	5:13
2.	"Inikah Ertinya Cinta"	3:52
3.	"Berita Terkini"	1:01
4.	"KRU is Wild"	3:46
5.	"Di Depan Mata"	4:39
6.	"Terima Kasih"	4:13
7.	"I.R.A."	4:05
8.	"MC's Groove"	0:42
9.	"Go! KRU (T.R.R.G.)"	3:56
10.	"Da Party"	3:33
11.	"Gadis Jelita (O.T. Enchanted Lady)"	3:56
12.	"Katanya..."	4:14
13.	"Asimilasi 106"	4:07
14.	"Janji Tinggal Janji"	6:30
15.	"Mengerti" (Radio Edit)	5:18
16.	"Terima Kasih" (Radio Edit)	4:14
17.	"Asimilasi 106" (Radio Edit)	4:04
Total length:		67:25

== Release and reception ==
reKRUed was released on October 1993. Upon its release, the album received considerable attention from music critics for its rap and acappella influences. As of 1994, the album sold over 60,000 copies.

To promote the album's release, KRU held an interview session with fans via a telephone on 4 December, as well as embarking their nationwide tour, ReKRUed Rap Tour from 18 December 1993 to 23 April 1994.

== Personnel ==
Credits adapted from reKRUed booklet liner notes.

- KRU – vocals, backing vocals, mixer, composer, arranger, producer
- Mohd Arzmy - executive producer
- Man Kidal - guitar
- Izan - backing vocals, engineer
- Thana - backing vocals, engineer
- DanceKRU - voice
- Sophie Fisher - voice
- Jodi Milliner - composer
- Seabochan - composer
- Susie Banfield - composer
- Pete Wingfield - composer, lyrics
- Ahmad C.B. - composer
- Amir - engineer
- Suzanne Kong - design concept, graphics
- David Lok - photography
- Brian Garner - mastering

== Release history ==
Region	Release date	Format	Label
Malaysia	October 1993	CD, Digital download	EMI Music Malaysia
