= Canggih =

Studio album by KRU
- Released: 5 October 1992
- Recorded: May – August 1992
- Studio: Channel 11 Studio
- Genre: Pop; Hip-hop
- Length: 41:00
- Label: EMI Music Malaysia
- Producer: KRU

KRU chronology
Canggih (1992)	reKRUed (1993)

Singles from Canggih
- 1. "Cherrina" Released: 1992; 2. "Hanya Kau" Released: 1992

Canggih (Sophisticated) is the debut studio album by Malaysian boy band, KRU. It was released on 5 October 1992 by EMI Music Malaysia.

== Production ==
In 1992, after established KRU and signed up with EMI Music Malaysia, the brothers – Norman, Yusry and Edry Abdul Halim – began working on their debut album. KRU agreed upon the condition that they would be given creative freedom to conceptualise the album.

Canggih was recorded at Channel 11 Studios in Kuala Lumpur, using a lots of special effects and programmed "towards techno music". According to Norman, one of the KRU brothers, Canggih is "actually a heavy sampling of the variety of rap music". He also describe the album's production "is more like an experimental project". The brothers contributed all 11 tracks except "Generasiku" which was penned by Ritchie Blackmore, Roger Glover, Jon Lord and Ian Paice. Although majority of the songs in the album is recorded in Malay, KRU also recorded four English songs: "U Make My Day", "Get in 2 the Hype", "Perception of Love" and "Ain't Got No Soul". According to KRU, the reason they recorded English tracks in Canggih are as they wanted to reach the non-Malay music market.

The song, "2020", was specially dedicated to then-fourth Prime Minister, Mahathir Mohamad and was inspired by Wawasan 2020, which was introduced by Mahathir a year before. Due to language concerns, KRU change the lyrics of "2020" from 'twenty twenty' to 'duapuluh duapuluh' upon request from Malaysian public broadcaster, Radio Televisyen Malaysia (RTM).

== Track listing ==
All tracks are written by Norman, Yusry and Edry Abdul Halim except where noted.

No.	Title	Writer(s)	Length
1.	"Canggih"		1:06
2.	"Hanya Kau"		4:12
3.	"20/20"		3:22
4.	"U Make My Day"		4:27
5.	"Generasiku"	Ritchie Blackmore; Roger Glover; Jon Lord; Ian Paice; KRU	3:37
6.	"Sempoi"		4:13
7.	"Get in 2 the Hype"		3:26
8.	"Cherrina"		4:00
9.	"Perception of Love"		4:04
10.	"Ain't Got No Soul"		4:37
11.	"Tradisi"		0:54
12.	"Sekali Lagi (Gadisku)"		3:38
Total length:			41:00

== Release and reception ==
Canggih was well-received upon its release on 5 October 1992, selling over 20,000 copies and being certified platinum. "Cherrina" and "Hanya Kau" was released as singles and made into music videos. As of 1994, Canggih has sold over 70,000 copies.

However, not long after its release, the Malaysian public broadcaster RTM filed a complain about the album's content, which was deemed to promoting yellow culture. As a result, 9 out of the 12 songs in the album were banned from airing.

Reviewing the album, a media critic of the New Straits Times lauded the album "with a difference and full of surprises" and "is worth checking up on".

== Personnel ==
Credits adapted from Canggih booklet liner notes.

- KRU – vocals, backing vocals, mixer, composer, arranger, producer
- Mohd Arzmy - executive producer
- Ritchie Blackmore - composer
- Roger Glover - composer
- Jon Lord - composer
- Ian Paice - composer
- Henry Teh - mixer
- Detroit Eng - recorder
- Ben - recorder
- Thana - recorder

== Certifications ==
Region	Certification	Certified units/sales
Malaysia	Platinum	20,000

== Release history ==
Region	Release date	Format	Label
Malaysia	5 October 1992	CD, Digital download	EMI Music Malaysia
