= KRU Music =

- Parent company: KRU Entertainment
- Founded: 1996
- Founder: Norman Abdul Halim; Yusry Abdul Halim; Edry Abdul Halim
- Status: Active
- Distributor(s): Warner Music (Malaysia)
- Genre: Pop, R&B, hip hop, explicit music, rock, EDM
- Country of origin: Malaysia
- Location: Kuala Lumpur, Singapore

KRU Music Sdn Bhd is a Malaysian record label formed in 1996 by the singers-songwriters-producers jointly known as "KRU". Initially formed as KRU Records as a joint venture company with EMI, KRU Music changed its name and went fully independent in 1999 and have worked with Taiwan-based label Rock Records (1999 to 2001), Warner Music (2002 to 2004), EMI (2004 to 2006), United Studios (2007 to 2013) and currently Sony Music as distributors for their physical album releases. One Stop Music has released KRU Music's catalogue on digital formats since 2006.

KRU Music is one of the biggest independent labels in South East Asia with offices in Kuala Lumpur and Singapore.

== Artists ==
- Jaclyn Victor
- #tag
- Hazury
- Qasri
- Yo Gabba Gabba!
- Fitri Hakim
- Choo Choo Soul
- ZiaBella
- Zendaya
- Yvette Gonzalez-Nacer
- Forteen
- The Fresh Beat Band
- Wings
- Capital Cities
- KRU
- Elite
- Marsha
- Slumber Party Girls
- Adam AF2
- Mojo
- ZizanKRU
- Iqwan Alif
