= EMI Music Malaysia =

Malaysian record label

- Parent company: EMI (1966–1979; 1996–2008); Thorn EMI (1979–1996); Universal Music Group (2014; revived 2023–present)
- Status: Active
- Genre: Various
- Country of origin: Malaysia
- Location: Kuala Lumpur
- Official website: www.emimusicpub.com/global-offices/malaysia/home.php

EMI Music Malaysia is a record label operating as a subsidiary of Universal Music Malaysia. Originally established in the 1970s as a regional branch of the multinational EMI Group, the label played a major role in the Malaysian music industry by supporting local artists and combating music piracy. Following the dissolution of the EMI Group, EMI Music was acquired by Universal Music Group.

In May 2023, the label experienced a revival as part of Universal Music Southeast Asia's "Nusantara Project," signaling a renewed focus on promoting Southeast Asian music talent.

== History ==
Originally established in the 1970s, it played a key role in combating music piracy before ceasing independent operations in 2008. Following a 2014 acquisition by Universal Music Group, EMI Malaysia's releases had been distributed under the Universal Music Malaysia label.

EMI Music Malaysia has become part of the Universal Music Group since 2014. EMI Music Malaysia releases are distributed by Universal Music Sdn. Bhd. The publishing unit EMI Music Publishing Malaysia Sdn. Bhd have become part of Sony/ATV.

On 19 June 2023, Universal Music Malaysia announced its revival of the label.

== Artist ==
List of all artists who have been within the company, including former artists and those who have died:

A

- Ahmad Jais
- Aman Shah
- Ahmad Nawab
- Aishah
- Anita Sarawak

B

- Black Dog Bone

C

- Carefree (Malaysian pop band)

D

- D. J. Dave
- Dwen

E

- Ella
- Ezra Kairo

F

- Fazidah Joned
- Fauziah Latiff

G

- Gaya Zakry

H

- Habibah Yaakub
- Halil Chik
- Hail Amir
- Herman Tino
- Hakim Ahmad

I

- Irfan Haris
- Ismail Haron

J

- Jennifer Yen
- Junainah M. Amin

K

- Kartina Dahari
- Kamariah Noor

L

- Latif Ibrahim

M

- Maria Menado

N

- Normadiah
- Nona Asiah
- Noorkumalasari
- Nuha Bahrin

P

- P. Ramlee

R

- Rozita Rohaizad
- Rosemaria
- Rafeah Buang
- Rose Iskandar

S

- Saloma
- Sarena Hashim
- Sanisah Huri
- Sharifah Aini
- Sudirman Arshad
- Sheila Abdul
- Sheila Majid

U

- Uji Rashid

Z

- Ziana Zain
- Zaleha Hamid

== See also ==
- List of EMI labels
