= Sharing (album) =

Sharing 分享

Compilation album by Danell 李桀漢
- Released: September 2008 (Malaysia)
- Label: Sony BMG Malaysia

Danell 李桀漢 chronology
Pasti (2008)	Sharing 分享 (2008)	Danell Live Concert (2009)

Sharing 分享 (Pinyin: Fēn Xiǎng) is the video compilation album (fourth album overall) by winner of Malaysian Idol 2, Danell Lee Chieh Hun, released on 27 September 2008. This is also the first album released under the artiste's new name, which was formerly Daniel Lee Chee Hun (李吉汉 Lǐ Jíhàn).

In reality, it features more of a compilation of songs from his past 3 albums, Daniel Lee Chee Hun, Unavoidable and Pasti, with the inclusion of 2 new songs. What makes this album special is that the entire compilation comes in the form of a karaoke DVD containing MVs of all 15 songs plus a bonus audio CD that contains the 2 newer songs. The 15 MVs are also accompanied with their respective karaoke versions.

== Karaoke DVD MV listing ==
No	Name	English translation	Original album	Note
1	我的志愿 (Wǒ De Zhì Yuàn)	My Aspiration	New song	Mandarin translation from Adakah Aku Yang Bermimpi
2	飞 (Fēi)	Fly	Daniel 李吉汉	Mandarin translation from Danell's Malaysian Idol 2 winning piece, Mimpi
3	有机 (Yǒu Jī)	Organic Love	Daniel 李吉汉	
4	现在很想见你 (Xiàn Zài Hěn Xiǎng Jiàn Nǐ)	I Love To See You Now	Daniel 李吉汉	
5	幸运儿 (Xìng Yùn Ér)	The Lucky One	Daniel 李吉汉	
6	因为有爱 (Yīn Wèi Yǒu Ài)	Because of Love	Unavoidable 躲不過	Remake of Danny One's song of the same title
7	原谅我 (Yuán Liàng Wǒ)	Forgive Me	Unavoidable 躲不過	
8	Love Is Under The Sky		Unavoidable 躲不過	
9	你的生日快乐吗？ (Nǐ De Shēng Rì Kuài Lè Ma?)	Are You Happy On Your Birthday	Unavoidable 躲不過	
10	Mimpi	Dream	Mimpi, Daniel 李吉汉	Danell's Malaysian Idol 2 winning piece
11	Tiada Maaf	Unforgivable	Pasti	
12	Adakah Aku Yang Bermimpi	Am I The One Dreaming	Pasti	
13	Dikau Ku Ingati	You I Shall Remember	Pasti	Bahasa Malaysia translation from 幸运儿 (The Lucky One)
14	On Every Line		New song	Sung in primarily Mandarin and Cantonese, with several English lines.: Cantonese lines: Jason Chan (HK singer); Mandarin lines: Danell Lee; Rap: Danny One
15	万年烽火 (Wàn Nián Fēng Huǒ)	Devastation	Unavoidable 躲不過	Live footage version: taken from Kuala Lumpur Sungei Wang Plaza 51st Merdeka (National Day) Countdown Concert
16	精彩幕后花絮 (Jīng Cǎi Mù Hòu Huā Xù)	Behind The Scene...		A video footage of Danell sharing the process of shooting of the MV for 我的志愿 (My Aspiration) and Adakah Aku Yang Bermimpi

== Bonus audio CD track listing ==
1. 我的志愿 (My Aspiration)
2. On Every Line

== Name change ==
During the album's first meet-the-fans session on 27 September 2008 at Berjaya Times Square, Danell announced the change of both his Chinese and English names, which he done secretly in August. This was done due to popular Chinese belief that a change in the name may bring better luck and Danell himself actually experienced better luck after 'trying out' his new name for a month and thus officially adopting it.

Danell himself admitted that he has refused to become the 'sweet boy' after 3 years in the entertainment scene and would like to try on more mature-toned songs. This was clearly shown in his MV for 我的志愿 (My Aspiration)
