= Ikon Malaysia =

Singing competition in Malaysia

IKON Malaysia is a reality singing competition which searches for a champion among existing or established artistes rather than among new, unknown starlets as in other such singing competitions. The programme was co-launched with IKON Indonesia and IKON Philippines in late 2006 as an initiative to search for an artiste who can represent the country in the regional, ASEAN level. The verdict is determined by 70% of jury marks and 30% SMS.

Ikon Malaysia began its run on Astro Ria in May 2007, and is hosted by Sarimah Ibrahim.

The final stage was held on 28 July 2007. Jaclyn Victor and OAG was chosen to represent Malaysia in Ikon ASEAN which was held on 12 August 2007.

== Contenders ==
=== Solo ===
- Adam
- Daniel Lee
- Dayang Nurfaizah
- Dina
- Ezlynn
- Farah
- Jaclyn Victor
- Mawi
- Reshmonu
- Shanon Shah

=== Group/Band ===
- Search
- Def Gab C
- Disagree
- Flop Poppy
- Gerhana Skacinta
- Jinbara
- May
- Mirwana
- OAG
