= Wajah =

Wajah may refer to:

- Wajah, Helmand, Afghanistan
- Wajahh: A Reason to Kill, a 2004 Indian film
- "Wajah", a 2005 song by Jaclyn Victor
