= Siti Sarah =

Malaysian singer and actress (1984–2021)

- Born: Siti Sarah binti Raissuddin; 15 September 1984; Ipoh, Perak, Malaysia
- Died: 9 August 2021 (aged 36); Kuala Lumpur, Malaysia
- Resting place: Sungai Pusu Islamic Cemetery, Gombak, Selangor
- Occupations: Singer, actress
- Years active: 2001–2021
- Spouse: Shuib Sepahtu (m. 2011–2021)
- Children: 4
- Musical career
- Genres: Pop; pop rock; R&B
- Instrument: Vocals
- Labels: NAR Records; Indigital Music

Siti Sarah Raissuddin (15 September 1984 – 9 August 2021) was a Malaysian singer and actress. She started her career in the music industry when she became the final contestant of 2001 edition of Bintang RTM. She also won Best New Artist, Best Pop Album and Best Album at the 2003 Anugerah Industri Muzik (AIM 2003). In addition, she also won the Best Female New Artist award at the 2003 Anugerah Planet Muzik (APM 2003). She was also the only new artist to be nominated in the Best Female Artist category which was won by Siti Nurhaliza that year.

== Early life ==
Siti Sarah was born on 15 September 1984 in Ipoh, Perak. She was the second child of 3 siblings and the only daughter in her family to Raisuddin Hamzah and Noor Aini Mohamed. Sarah had one older brother, Ahmad Firdous and a younger brother, Ahmad Yazeed.

== Career ==
Her father, Raisuddin had also started his career as a singer when he participated in the same competition in the early 1980s. Siti Sarah's talent in the music industry was first discovered at the Bintang URTV 2001 competition at the East Zone level where she was the champion after singing the Indonesian song, "Ku Akui". The championship also took her to the finals of the competition which took place in September 2001.

After joining Bintang RTM and Bintang URTV 2001, she signed a recording contract with NAR Records in early 2002. Her self-titled debut album, was released in the same year with the song "Kesetiaan" released as the first single. Her second album, Mimpi Pun Sama was released in December 2003, which sold 12,000 copies. "Jangan Kau Mimpi" and "Saat Hilang Cintamu" were released as singles. She was one of the few Malaysian artists who contributed her voice for a special song entitled "Suluhkan Sinar". Produced by KRU and released in January 2005, the song is specially dedicated to the victims of the 2004 Indian Ocean earthquake and tsunami and was officiated by the then Deputy Prime Minister, Najib Razak. Other artists involved in the project were Akademi Fantasia participants, Erra Fazira, Dayang Nurfaizah, Alleycats, Jaclyn Victor, AC Mizal, Spider, Ning Baizura and Anita Sarawak. Also in 2005, her third and final studio album, Tiada Dikau Tiada Makna was released. "Bersamamu" and "Tinggal Serpihan" were released as lead singles. Her first compilation album, Suatu Perjalanan was released in 2008 featuring her hit songs from her 3 previous albums.

Siti Sarah participated in the reality competition for the second season of One in a Million which saw recording artists including her compete with new faces to raise RM1,000,000 as music career funding. She finished in third place. Her weekly performances were quite energetic and proud. In 2009, Siti Sarah participated in an international competition, the World Championship of Performing Arts (WCOPA), gaining 3 gold medals to Malaysia. In addition to the artist at the time, Bob AF also gained 5 gold medals for the country. She was also involved in acting, starring in the film Man Sewel Datang KL (2011) alongside her husband, Shuib Sepahtu. In the film, she played the role of Salbiah.

In 2016, Sarah became one of the contestants for the 3rd season of Gegar Vaganza, a reality competition for experienced singers. She became the second runner-up in the first week through her hit song, "Jangan Kau Mimpi" with an energetic vocal and dance performance. She also remained Top 2 for the next 2 weeks through the song "Teratai Layu di Tasik Madu" (originally performed by Fauziah Latiff) and Joget Sayang-menyayang (Anita Sarawak). At the end of the third season, Sarah was named the runner-up. In 2018, she released a new single, "Semakin" written by her husband, Shuib. She also dueted with her husband for the song, "Semakin Benci Semakin Cinta" by Ajai, which was released in June 2021. It would turn out to be her last official recording.

== Personal life ==
Siti Sarah was engaged to New Zealand motorcyclist Muhammad Harith Fuad Robinson in January 2007 but their engagement ended in early 2008. They had previously been rumored to have had an affair around November 2006.

Siti Sarah then married comedian Shahmira Muhamad or popularly Shuib Sepahtu on 26 February 2011. The couple had four children, Uwais Alqarni, Dzahira Talita Zahra, Ariq Matin and Ayash Affan. She started wearing the headscarf in May 2018.

Her mother, Noor Aini Mohamed, died on 26 June 2013.

== Controversy ==
In September 2020, Siti Sarah faced criticism from netizens for insulting the hair of the Orang Asli in a video. The action was done through a TikTok video recording from the account of famous salon owner Ridzo Kumura which was posted by a Twitter user. She, however, made a public apology.

In February 2021, Sarah and her husband, Shuib were fined RM1,000 each after being found to have violated the standard operating procedures (SOPs) of the imposed Movement Control Order (MCO) during the COVID-19 pandemic in Malaysia at food premises in Kuala Lipis, Pahang.

== Death ==
Siti Sarah died from COVID-19 at the Hospital Canselor Tuanku Muhriz (HCTM) UKM on 9 August 2021, at the age of 36. She was survived by her husband Shuib Sepahtu and four children including her newborn fourth child three days before her death. Her remains were buried and laid to rest at the Kampung Sungai Pusu Islamic Cemetery, Gombak.

== Discography ==
=== Studio albums ===
- Sarah (2002)
- Mimpi Pun Sama (2003)
- Tiada Dikau Tiada Makna (2005)

=== Compilation albums ===
- Suatu Perjalanan (2008)

=== Singles ===
Year	Title	Peak positions				Album
Year	Title	Era	Muzik.fm	Baik Banget	Muzik-muzik	Album
2002	"Kesetiaan"	1	—	—	1	Sarah
2002	"Ku Teruskan"	—	—	—	6	Sarah
2002	"Ke Hujung Dunia"	—	—	—	—	Sarah
2003	"Pesan Mamaku"	—	—	—	4	Sarah
2003	"Sandarkan Pada Kenangan" duet with Jamal Abdillah	1	—	—	—	Raja Pop
2003	"Saat Hilang Cintamu"	—	—	—	1	Mimpi Pun Sama
2004	"Jangan Kau Mimpi"	—	—	—	1	Mimpi Pun Sama
2004	"Kenangi Daku"	—	—	—	—	Mimpi Pun Sama
2004	"Mimpi Pun Sama"	—	—	—	—	Mimpi Pun Sama
2004	"Tinggalkan Diriku"	—	—	—	2	Mimpi Pun Sama
2004	"Loka Logiknya" with Ajai & Deja Moss	—	—	—	—	Terbaik Ajai
2005	"Suluhkan Sinar" with Misha Omar, Anita Sarawak, Erra Fazira, Dayang Nurfaizah, Ezlynn, Jaclyn Victor, Ning Baizura, Vince Chong, Zahid Baharuddin, Hazami, Fazley Yaacob, Rabbani, Alleycats, Spider, Ruffedge, KRU and Raihan with support Waheeda, DJ Dave, Yana Samsuddin, AC Mizal, Azharina Azhar, Malissa Januddin, Ifa Raziah, Juliza Adzlizan, Salimah Mahmood, Sasi The Don, kumpulan Nitrus, Sofaz, Def Gab C, Phynne Ballerz, Pretty Ugly, Slam, Newboyz, By'U, D;Va, and members of Akademi Fantasia	—	—	—	—	CD Amal Tsunami
2005	"Malis Cinta"	—	—	—	—	Tiada Dikau Tiada Makna
2005	"Bersamamu"	—	—	—	1	Tiada Dikau Tiada Makna
2006	"Menari Denganku" duet with Zahid Baharuddin	—	—	—	1	Tiada Dikau Tiada Makna
2006	"Cinta Usia Kita"	—	—	—	—	Tiada Dikau Tiada Makna
2007	"Pasti Berbeza"	—	—	—	—	Suatu Perjalanan
2012	"Cinta Itu Nyawa" duet with Shuib	—	—	—	20	Bukan album single
2019	"Semakin"	—	—	—	—	Semakin
2020	"Manis"	—	—	—	—	Manis
2020	"Terakhir Buat Teman" duet with Hazama	—	—	—	—	Terakhir Buat Teman
2021	"Semakin Benci Semakin Cinta" duet with Shuib	—	—	—	—	Semakin Benci Semakin Cinta

== Filmography ==
=== Film ===
Year	Title	Role
2013	Man Sewel Datang KL	Salbiah

=== Television film ===
Year	Title	Role	TV channel
2004	Cinta Apa Di Pagi Raya?	Mawar Desa	TV1
2009	Geng Raya Zizan	Melah	Astro Ria

=== Television ===
Year	Title	Role	TV channel	Notes
2001	Bintang RTM	Participant	TV2	
2012	Karoot Komedia X	Guest	Astro Warna	Episode: "Batu Belah Batu Bertangkup"
2013	Romantika	Herself	Astro Ria	
2016	Gegar Vaganza (Season 3)	Participant	Astro Ria	
2018	Mentor Otai	Mentor	TV3	
2018	MeleTOP	Guest	Astro Ria	
2018	Salam Baitullah	Guest	TV1	
2019	Tanya Cik Man (Season 2)	Guest	Astro Oasis	Episode: "Suami Mengaku Bujang"
2019	Sepahtu Reunion Live	Cameo	Astro Warna	Episode: "Esok Belum Tentu Ada"
2019	Rasa Anak Emak Anak Bapak	Herself with his father Raisuddin Hamzah	Astro Prima	
2019	Al-Hidayah	Guest	TV3	
2019	Seri Murni Dapur Duet	Guest	TV3	
2019	Jom Berbuka	Guest	TV3	
2019	I Can See Your Voice Malaysia (season 2)	Guest	TV3	
2019	Di Balik Idola	Guest	Astro Ria	
2020	Trek Selebriti	Guest	Astro Ria	
2020	Wanita Hari Ini	Guest	TV3	
2021	Hujung Ke Hujung	Guest	TV Okey	
2021	Anugerah Malam Ini	Guest	Awesome TV	
2021	Malaysia Hari Ini	Guest	TV3	
2021	Senduk Kuali Kak Lina Pom Pom	Guest	TV2	
2021	MeleTOP	Guest	Astro Ria	
