= Sensation (Aishah and The Fan Club album) =

Studio album by Aishah and The Fan Club
- Released: August 1988
- Recorded: February 1988
- Studios: Harlequin (Auckland); Mascot (Auckland)
- Genre: Dance pop
- Length: 37:34
- Label: CBS
- Producer: Doug Rogers

Aishah and The Fan Club chronology
Sensation (1988)	Respect the Beat (1989)

Singles from Sensation
- 1. "Sensation" Released: April 1988; 2. "Call Me" Released: 1988; 3. "Paradise" Released: 1988; 4. "W.G.A.F." Released: 1988

Sensation is the debut album by New Zealand band Aishah and The Fan Club, commonly known as simply The Fan Club. It was released in August 1988 through CBS Records and produced multiple commercially successful singles in New Zealand and Malaysia.

== Development and singles ==
Sensation was recorded at Auckland's Harlequin and Mascot studios in February 1988, engineered by Rhys Moody and Doug Rogers and produced by the latter. It features guest vocals from Margaret Urlich, who had recently left the band Peking Man to begin a solo career, and her When the Cat's Away bandmate Debbie Harwood.

The title track of Sensation was released as its lead single in April 1988 and peaked at No. 11 in New Zealand, becoming the 45th best-selling single in the country in 1988. "Call Me" (a Spagna cover) and "Paradise" followed later that year, reaching No. 9 and No. 20 respectively. All three singles also charted in lead singer Aishah's home country of Malaysia. The track "W.G.A.F." was released as a fourth single but did not chart in New Zealand, being more experimental and minimalistic in comparison to the album's overall tone of synth-driven dance pop.

== Track listing ==
All tracks are written by Malcolm Smith and Paul Moss except "Call Me" written by Ivana Spagna, Larry Pignagnoli, and Giorgio Spagna.

No.	Title	Length
1.	"Sensation"	3:55
2.	"Paradise"	3:22
3.	"Call Me"	4:39
4.	"No-One's Taking the Place of You"	4:39
5.	"You Gave It All Away"	2:27
6.	"W.G.A.F."	5:39
7.	"Don't Do It"	4:15
8.	"Right Now"	3:56
9.	"Be With You"	4:42
Total length:		37:34

== Personnel ==
Credits adapted from album sleeve.

The Fan Club

- Aishah – lead vocals
- Dave Larsen – drums
- Paul Moss – guitar, programming
- Glenn Peters – bass
- Malcolm Smith – synthesizer, programming

Additional personnel

- Brigitte Barco – dialogue
- Walter Bianco – saxophone
- Debbie Harwood – backing vocals
- Rhys Moody – mixing, recording
- Doug Rogers – mixing, production, recording
- Margaret Urlich – backing vocals

== Charts ==
Chart (1988)	Peak position
New Zealand Albums (RMNZ)	15
