= Pasti (EP) =

EP by Daniel Lee Chee Hun
- Released: 17 June 2008 (Malaysia)
- Genre: Pop
- Label: Sony BMG Malaysia

Daniel Lee Chee Hun chronology
Unavoidable 躲不過 (2007)	Pasti (2008)	Sharing 分享 (2008)

Pasti is the first EP or mini-album (second actual EP overall and third album overall) by winner of Malaysian Idol 2, Daniel Lee Chee Hun, released on 17 June 2008. Unlike his previous two trilingual albums, this album shall be Danell Lee's first Bahasa Malaysia/Malay mini-album (second actual EP overall) since he won the reality show, as a gesture of gratitude to his non-Chinese fans. It was the last album was released when he was used his original name before changed to Danell until 2011.

== Track listing ==
1. "Tiada Maaf"
2. "Adakah Aku Yang Bermimpi"
3. "Dikau Ku Ingati"
4. "Mimpi"
5. "Adakah Aku Yang Bermimpi" (karaoke version)

== Production ==
Production of this album is the result of a combination of works by local Malaysian song composers and producers, such as Azlan Abu Hassan.
