= Aishah and the Fan Club =

New Zealand pop group

- Origin: New Zealand
- Years active: 1988–1993
- Past members: Aishah; Paul Moss; Dave Larsen; Glenn Peters; Malcolm Smith; Hazri Yutim

Aishah and the Fan Club, better known as the Fan Club, or just Fan Club, were a New Zealand-based pop and dance band in the late 1980s and early 1990s. The group released their first album Sensation in 1988, which spawned three top-20 singles in the New Zealand and Malaysian charts: "Sensation", "Paradise" and "Call Me" – the latter being a remake of a Spagna song of the same name.

Their second album, titled Respect the Beat, also produced three hit singles: "I Feel Love", "I Never Gave Up on You", and "Don't Let Me Fall Alone". The album received a positive review in Billboard and the remix for "Don't Let Me Fall Alone" received heavy airplay on US Top 40 stations throughout the summer of 1990.

The group was formed while Aishah was in New Zealand studying in the late 1980s. She was spotted by the other members of the group, and asked to join the band. Besides Aishah who sang lead vocals, the other members included Paul Moss on guitar and programming, Dave Larsen on drums, Glenn Peters on bass, Malcolm Smith on keyboards, and Hazri Yutim on second keyboard/synthesiser. Malcolm and Paul were also the main songwriters for the group.

The band won the International Artist of the Year at the 1991 New Zealand Music Awards.

Aishah remains popular in Malaysia and has released music in the Malay language, while also entering Malaysian politics. Paul Moss also lives in Malaysia where he became one of the judges of the reality TV singing competitions Malaysian Idol and One in a Million.

== Discography ==
=== Albums ===
Year	Title	Details	Peak chart positions
Year	Title	Details	NZ
1988	Sensation	Format: LP, cassette, CD; Label: CBS Records New Zealand; Catalogue: 460707 1	15
1989	Respect the Beat	Format: LP, cassette, CD; Label: CBS Records New Zealand; Catalogue: 465871 2	28

=== Singles ===
Year	Title	Peak chart positions	Album
Year	Title	NZ	Album
1988	"Sensation"	11	Sensation
1988	"Call Me"	9	Sensation
1988	"Paradise"	20	Sensation
1989	"I Feel Love"	8	Respect the Beat
1990	"Never Gave Up on You"	25	Respect the Beat
1990	"Don't Let Me Fall Alone"	28	Respect the Beat
