= OAG (band) =

Malaysian pop rock band

- Origin: Kuala Lumpur, Malaysia
- Genres: Alternative rock, Indie rock
- Years active: 1992–2009, 2012-present
- Labels: Positive Tone 1992-1996; Sony Music; EMI; Monkey Bones; Radhio Indiestry
- Members: Muhammad Radhi Razali (vocal, 1992-2009, 2012- present & bass 2023-present); Dean Yusof (Guitar, 2023-present); Ringoe Dahar (drum, 2023-present)
- Past members: Ivan (guitar, 1992-1995); Lum (bass, 1992-1995); Qi Razali / Chi (drum, 1992-1999, 2002, 2016 - 2023); Adin (guitar, 1995-1999); Edmund (bass, 1995-1999); Alim (guitar, 2000-2004); Miki (bass, 2000); Farid (drum, 2000); Andy Flop Poppy (guitar, 2001); Miji Flop Poppy (bass, 2001); Bakri Flop Poppy (drum, 2001); Naza(guitar, 2002-2004); Edwin (bass, 2002-2003); Mono (bass, 2003-2004); Attan (drum, 2003-2004); Fizul(drum, 2004-2009); Sarah (bass, 2004); Zul (guitar, 2004-2009); Nizam (guitar, 2005-2009, 2012-2017); Eric (bass, 2005-2009); Afiq (guitar, 2012-2014/2015); Azzam (drum, 2012-2015); Izmer (keyboard, 2012-2017, 2019); Ammal Bellamy(guitar, 2016-2023); Nazrin Zabidi(bass, 2012-2023)

OAG, also written as O@G, also known as Old Automatic Garbage, Orang Asia Genius, or Only Allah Great is a Malaysian pop and alternative rock band, formed in 1992. The current line-up of the band is Muhammad Radhi Razali (vocals & bass), Dean Yusof (guitar) and Ringoe Dahar (drums).

== History ==
=== 1994–1999: Debut, 67 EP and Melody Mocker ===
The original line-up of the band was Radhi, Qi (drums), Mohd Azrie Hadi a.k.a. Ayie (guitar), Ivan (lead guitar) and Lam (bass guitar). Ivan and Lam returned to their studies in 1996, to be replaced by Edmund Boey (bass guitar) and Adin (lead guitar). They were signed to the Positive Tone label by producer Paul Moss. Positive Tone released OAG's 11-track album Old Automatic Garbage in December 1994, which went triple platinum. They won the Best New Artist category in the Anugerah Industri Muzik in 1996 and their first video, 60's TV, directed by Brad Hogarth, was also nominated for the Best Video category.

In 1997, the band wrote and performed the official theme to the 1997 FIFA World Youth Championship, which was released in eight European countries. They also contributed to the alternative compilation album Boys & Girls 1+1=3, which went platinum. In 1997, OAG released a six-track EP entitled 67, followed by Melody Mocker in 1999.

=== 2000–2004: Opera Radhi-o Friendly and Satelit Ink ===
Around 2000, OAG began making music in the Malay language. Their debut Malay album, Opera Radhi-o Friendly which also includes an English song and a Sarawakian Malay song, was released in 2002. The first single from the album, Slumber, reached #1 on Era FM's Carta Era. A year later, they released their second Malay album, Satelit Ink. Naza and Alim and Mon left OAG after Satelit Ink to form The Times.

=== 2005–2011: OrAnG, temporary hiatus ===
OAG returned with a new line-up in 2005, of Radhi, the founder of OAG, together with Hafizul Azim, Muhamad Nizam, Azeezul Fitri and Eric Wong. They recorded an album, OrAnG, which was released in 2006. In July 2007, OAG won the group category in the Ikon Malaysia competition. Together with Jaclyn Victor, the winner of the solo category, the band went on to represent Malaysia in the regional IKON ASEAN in August 2007, where they did not win.

A year later OAG released a patriotic-themed single, Merdayka, which they had debuted live on Ikon Malaysia a year earlier. While Radhi released a solo single Infiniti under the stage name Radhi-O, the rest of the band established a new band, OrAnG, named after their 2006 album, though without releasing any new material. During this time, Radhi received nationwide attention related to his unstable marriage and struggles with drug addiction.

=== 2012–2013 ===
In 2012, Radhi recruited new musicians for OAG, selected from among the students of Akademi Seni Budaya dan Warisan Kebangsaan (English: National Academy of Cultural and Heritage Arts). The new line-up consists of Azzam (drums), Muhamad Nizam (guitar - since 2005), Nazrin Zabidi (bass guitar/backing vocals), and Izmer Khasbullah (keyboard/backing vocals). Radhi defines OAG's new music as aslinatif, a combination of muzik asli or traditional music and alternative. Shortly after their reunion, they released the soundtrack and theme song to the TV series, Friday I'm in Love, followed by singles Si Pengasih Muda and Di Bawah Tanah Ayer.

=== 2014–present ===
In 2014, OAG returned with several new members, including original drummer Qi Razali, Nizam Norani (guitar) and Nazrin (bass guitar). Radhi hired a new guitarist in 2017, Ammal. OAG then released the English-language single Snowball in 2017, and Infiniti in late 2018.

On 25 December 2022, the band performed a 30th anniversary concert. The next month, on 13 January 2023, Qi Razali announced his departure from the band, leaving Radhi as the band's last remaining founding member. On 26 January, Ammal announced his departure.

== Discography ==
Old Automatic Garbage (album)

- Released: 1994
- Format: CD, Cassette
- Label: Positive Tone
- Producer: Paul Moss
- Tracks: "60's TV", "Horrible Adorable", "Yuppie", "Old Tuxedo", "Not", "Spastic Youth", "Underage", "Material", "Happy B'day", "Safety Pin", "Oldies Television"
- Singles: "60's TV"

Boys & Girls 1+1=3

- Released: 1996
- Format: CD
- Label: Positive Tone & Dreamwalk Studio
- Producer: Paul Moss
- Singles: "Disposable Garbage"

Experimental Playground 1967

- Released: 1997
- Format: CD
- Label: Sony Music
- Producer: Paul Moss
- Tracks: "Toxic", "Crush", "What's The Name of the Game", "Teeve (Indipendance re-Remixed)", "The Game's Not Over", "Raw Cut"
- Singles: "Name of The Game"

Coca Cola FIFA Youth World Cup

- Released: 1997
- Format: CD
- Singles: "Name of The Game"

Melody Mocker

- Released: 19 July 1999
- Format: CD
- Label: Positive Tone, EMI
- Producer: Paul Moss
- Tracks: "Knocked Silly", "Creepy Crawlies", "Teardrop", "The Crush", "Goddess", "Wheel of Pop", "8th Situation", "Fantasism", "Cut", "Wired"
- Singles: "Knocked Silly"

Opera Radhi-o Friendly

- Released: 2002
- Format: CD
- Label: Positive Tone, EMI
- Producer: Paul Moss, Greg Henderson
- Tracks: "Slumber", "Stanza", "Mutiara", "Natural", "Figura Malaya", "Biru", "For Whatever", "Senyawa", "Tadapapaya", "Hey! Hey!", Slumber (Tidurlah Radhi)
- Singles: "Slumber", "Biru"

Satelit Ink.

- Released: 2003
- Format: CD, Cassette
- Label: EMI
- Producer: Paul Moss, OAG
- Tracks: "Nowwhy2", "Konspirasi Bising Internasional", "Vanusia", "Beautifool", "Danish", "Stereokomunomu", "Anjelik", "Akustatik", "TV 60-an", "Nowwhy2 (Radhi-Free)", "Venusia (Radhi-Free)"
- Singles: "Nowwhy2", "Konspirasi Bising Internasional", "Beautifool", "Akustatik"

Soundtrack Gol & Gincu (filem)

- Released: 2005
- Format: CD
- Label: EMI
- Singles: "Generasiku"

OrAnG

- Released: 2006
- Format: CD, Cassette
- Label: EMI
- Producer: OAG
- Tracks: "BismiLAHIRrahmannirahim", "Sabtuday", "Ikhlust", "Dayang", "Giler", "Insya-ALLAH", "PerMYsuri", "Generasiku", "Dayang Marikh Asthmara", "IkhLAST"
- Singles: "Dayang", "Generasiku", "Permysuri", "Sabtuday"

Keunggulan Permysuri

- Released: 2006
- Format: CD
- Label: EMI
- Singles: "Senyuman Ragamu (featuring Gerhana Ska Cinta)"

Merdayka

- Released: 2008
- Format: CD

Friday I'm in Love

- Released: 2012
- Format: Soundtrack Friday Im In Love

Di Bawah Tanah Ayer

- Released: 2015
- Format: CD
- Label: Monkey Bones
- Writer: Radhio

SnowBall

- Released: 2017
- Format: CD
- Writer: Radhi OAG
- Producer: OAG

Infiniti

- Released: 2018
- Format: CD
- Writer: Radhi OAG
- Producer: OAG

SoulLaWatt

- Released: 2024
- Format: Digital
- Label: Radhio Indiestry
- Writer: Religious
- Producer: OAG
