= Respect the Beat =

Studio album by Aishah and The Fan Club
- Released: 1989
- Studio: Air Force Recording (Auckland)
- Labels: CBS; Epic
- Producer: Mark S. Berry

Aishah and The Fan Club chronology
Sensation (1988)	Respect the Beat (1989)

Singles from Respect the Beat
- 1. "I Feel Love" Released: 1989; 2. "Never Gave Up On You" Released: 1990; 3. "Don't Let Me Fall Alone" Released: 1990

Respect the Beat is the second (and final) studio album by New Zealand band Aishah and The Fan Club, released in 1989 by CBS Records as well as Epic Records in some territories. The album, produced by Mark S. Berry, reached No. 28 in New Zealand, where it was nominated for Album of the Year at the 1989 New Zealand Music Awards. Its success resulted in The Fan Club earning the International Recognition award at the 1990 Awards. However, Respect the Beat was the band's final album as lead singer Aishah decided to return to her native Malaysia, where the band was most successful, to pursue a solo career recording in the Malay language.

== Background and development ==
The Fan Club's first album, 1988's Sensation, had not only reached No. 15 in New Zealand but also attracted some international notice, including from Epic, who were later involved in international releases of Respect the Beat. This resulted in Respect the Beat having more global collaborators, including Americans such as producer Berry and songwriters Eric Beall and Alexandra Forbes, than its predecessor, which was mostly a New Zealand-made effort.

Recording of the album took place at Airforce Recording Studios in Auckland while mixing was done at Platinum Recording Studios in Sydney.

== Release and legacy ==
The album's first release was in 1989 with some international releases in 1990. Three singles were released to promote Respect the Beat; the first, 1989's "I Feel Love," reached the top 10 of the New Zealand singles chart, peaking at No. 8. It was also nominated for Single Of The Year at the 1989 New Zealand Music Awards and Best Music Video at the 1990 event, winning the latter but losing the former to Margaret Urlich's "Escaping." The following two singles, 1990's "Never Gave Up On You" and "Don't Let Me Fall Alone," respectively peaked at No. 25 and No. 28 in New Zealand.

As well as New Zealand, the singles had some brief success internationally, including in the United States, where "Don't Let Me Fall Alone" was played on some of the largest and most influential Top 40 radio stations. However, the band found most success promoting the album in Aishah's home country. While they had difficulty attracting crowds for live performances in New Zealand in spite of their charting singles, they could easily fill venues in Malaysia.

Even though its global success may have been short-lived, Respect the Beat cemented Aishah's legacy as one of the first Malaysian musicians to gain attention internationally.

== Track listing ==
No.	Title	Writer(s)	Length
1.	"I Feel Love"	Malcolm Smith; Paul Moss; Mark Berry
2.	"Don't Let Me Fall Alone"	Eric Beall; Alexandra Forbes
3.	"Never Gave Up On You"	Smith; Moss
4.	"Back On Track"	Smith; Moss; Berry
5.	"I Need You"	Smith; Moss; Berry
6.	"That's The Way That Love Is"	Smith; Moss; Berry
7.	"Don't Mess With Me"	Smith; Moss
8.	"There For You"	Smith; Moss
9.	"Colour Me Blue"	Smith; Moss
10.	"I Don't Need A Lover"	Smith; Moss

Source: CD liner.

== Personnel ==
- Aishah – vocals (all tracks), backing vocals (all tracks), vocal arrangements
- Mark S. Berry – production (all tracks), engineering, musical arrangements, vocal arrangements, mixing
- Paul Moss – programming (all tracks), guitar (tracks 1–2, 5, 9), backing vocals (track 6), musical arrangements, vocal arrangements
- Malcolm Smith – programming (all tracks), backing vocals (track 6), musical arrangements, vocal arrangements
- Glenn Peters – bass (all tracks), backing vocals (track 6)
- Dave Larsen – drums (all tracks), backing vocals (track 6)
- Suzanne Lynch – backing vocals (tracks 1–2, 4, 6–8, 10)
- Bunny Walters – backing vocals (tracks 1–2, 4, 6–8, 10)
- Walter Blanco – saxophone (tracks 1–2, 3, 8)
- Sam Panetta – keyboards (tracks 1–2, 4, 8) siren (track 10)
- Nick Morgan – engineering (all tracks), recording
- Mark Forrester – engineering (tracks 1, 3)
- Tony Salter – tape operation (all tracks)
- Paul Kosky – engineering (tracks 2, 4, 5–10)
- La Koi – rap vocals (tracks 3–4)
- John Cooper – backing vocals (track 6)
- Glenn McNair – backing vocals (track 6)
- Liam Ryan – piano (track 8)
- Polly Walker – graphic design, photography
- Debbie Watson – graphic design, styling
- Rachel Churchward – graphic design

Source: CD liner.

== Charts ==
=== Weekly charts ===
Chart (1988)	Peak position
New Zealand Albums (RMNZ)	28
