= Unavoidable =

Unavoidable 躲不過

Studio album by Daniel 李吉漢
- Released: June 2007 (Malaysia)
- Recorded: May/June, 2007
- Genre: Pop
- Length: 42:55
- Label: Sony BMG Malaysia

Daniel 李吉漢 chronology
Daniel Celebration Edition 慶功收藏版 (2006)	Unavoidable 躲不過 (2007)	Pasti (2008)

Unavoidable 躲不過 (Pinyin: Duǒ Bú Guò / Simplified Chinese: 躲不过) is the second album by winner of Malaysian Idol 2, Daniel Lee Chee Hun, released on 13 June 2007, approximately 18 months since his self-titled debut album.

== Production ==
Production of this album is the result of a combination of works by local Malaysian song composers and producers, such as Li Nai Gang (李乃刚), Zhang Jue Long (张觉隆), Danny One Li Ming (温力铭), Peng Xue Bin (彭学斌), Guan Qi Yuan (管启源) and Azlan Abu Hassan. Out of these six individuals, Danny himself is a local singer and appears alongside Danell in the MV for the song "Because of Love 因爲有愛", a remake of the former's own song of the same title, except that Daniel sang while Danny rapped.

Zhang Jue Long was responsible for writing one of Daniel's well-known hits, "I Love To See You Now 現在，很想見你", in his previous album. Guan Qi Yuan is one of the judges in the Malaysian version of Project Superstar (绝对Superstar), a Mandarin singing talent search competition, known as the most critical of all 5 judges.

Daniel was said to have been under pressure during the production of this album, partly he had spent most of his time gap between this album and the previous one in other works, such as guest appearances in concerts and also the idol television drama, Sky 星空, produced and shown on Malaysian channel, 8TV 八度空間. This has caused him to worry quite a bit as to whether his singing skills had improved since then. Daniel himself confessed that he repeated recording of the songs numerous times before he himself was really satisfied, despite receiving the green light from those in charge of the recording.

The cover of the album displays Daniel in a 'yuppie' suit, a reflection of maturity of Daniel in his singing career, thus removing him from his sunny image displayed in his previous album, an indication that he is no longer a newbie in the entertainment industry.

== Facts ==
Like his previous album, Unavoidable 躲不過 is a trilingual album consisting of 8 Mandarin songs, 1 English song and 1 Malay song. The order of the songs according to language is also the same; the English and Malay songs are the 9th and last songs respectively. As before, Daniel re-sings an existing English song and recorded one of the Malay songs he sang during his days in Malaysian Idol 2.

No. 1 hit song "Because of Love 因爲有愛" is a remake of Danny Wen Li Ming's song of the same title. Rap lyrics were added. Daniel sang the song while Danny rapped.

"Unavoidable 躲不過" is a Mandarin cover song of "Only Human", the theme song for Japanese true story-television drama 1 Litre of Tears 1リットルの涙 sung by Korean artist, K.

"Everytime" is an existing English song sung by British boy band, a1, in 1999.

"Angin Malam" is an existing Malay song sung by Indonesian singer, Broery Marantika. It is also one of the three songs sung by Daniel during the Grand Finale of Malaysian Idol 2 in 2005. Other two songs are "Heaven Knows" (by Rick Price and "Mimpi", both recorded in his first album.

== Music videos ==
Daniel produced MVs for the first two songs in this album, i.e. "Because of Love 因爲有愛" and "Love is Under The Sky". However, the MVs do not exactly come together with purchase of the album. Early grabbers are given a free VCD containing the MV for the song "Because of Love 因爲有愛" only. The MV for "Love is Under The Sky", on the other hand, is found in the celebration edition of this album.

== See also ==
- Danell Lee Chieh Hun
- Malaysian Idol
