= Boys & Girls 1+1=3 =

Compilation album by Various Artists
- Released: January 1, 1996
- Recorded: Dreamwalk studio
- Genres: Pop/rock; Alternative; Indie
- Length: 34:02
- Label: Positive Tone
- Producer: Paul Moss

Singles from Boys & Girls 1+1=3
- 1. "Bedroom Window" Released: 1996

Boys & Girls 1+1=3 is a Malaysian pop/rock compilation album produced by New Zealander Paul Moss and released on January 1, 1996.

== Contents ==
The songs on the album were written and/or performed in English, as part of the English-medium music scene Malaysia experienced in the 1990s, where local music was able to reach and grab the interest of international fans. The album featured a well established fand, OAG, but was primarily a debut album for several up and coming teen aged artists, like Nita, as well as some relatively unknown bands, like Nicestupidplayground, a teenage group from Sarawak, Borneo who until this album had not recorded professionally. The first and only single from the album was by Nicestupidplayground, called "Bedroom Window", and it is considered to have brought the band out of obscurity. Boys & Girls 1+1=3 also marked the recording debut for punk rock all-girl trio IntoXicated, goth rock duo Brodwyn (later renamed Juliet the Orange), and for Nita, who sang the song "He's a Mod", which is a cover of a song by The Senators called "She's a Mod" that was popularized in the 1960s by the band Ray Columbus & the Invaders. Also, Nita covered the song "True Love", which was originally written by The Marching Girls; both bands were from New Zealand, as was the album producer Paul Moss.

=== Success ===
Boys & Girls 1+1=3 has been called a "landmark" album for alternative Malaysian music. The song "Bedroom Window" caught the attention of movie producer Wayne Wang, who included the song in his 1997 movie starring Jeremy Irons, Chinese Box, as well as several other songs by Nicestupidplayground. Although the music for the movie received a Golden Osella award for Best Original Music at the Venice Film Festival in 1997, the soundtrack did not include "Bedroom Window". It was also used in the movie Rogue Trader starring Ewan McGregor, and a subsequent video featuring Malaysian model Asha Gill was nominated in the Anugerah Video Muzik, and won awards.

Boys & Girls 1+1=3 went on to receive positive reviews, and in 1997 it was certified double platinum (making over 40,000 sales) in Malaysia. The album also received several distinguished awards, such as the Anugerah Industri Muziks award for Best Local English album of the year, on March 22, 1997. It debuted on the Billboard charts in Malaysia on September 9, 1998, at number 5, peaked at number 1 on the 15th, and remained in the top ten for five weeks.

== Track listing ==
No.	Title	Writer(s)	Band	Length
1.	"Disposable Garbage"	OAG	OAG	2:28
2.	"He's a Mod"	Beale, Terry	Nita	2:41
3.	"Bedroom Window"	Rossem, Charles	Nice Stupid Playground	5:19
4.	"Radhi Taps His Guitar"	Radhi	OAG	1:34
5.	"Diet"	Rina	IntoXicated	1:46
6.	"Doraemon"	Nora	IntoXicated	0:59
7.	"True Love"	Cooke, Perry, & Munro	Nita	3:49
8.	"Kitty Kat"	Nora & Rina	IntoXicated	2:49
9.	"She Wants"	Rossem, Charles	Nice Stupid Playground	3:27
10.	"And I Don't Admire"	Rossem, Charles	Nice Stupid Playground	3:59
11.	"Ode From A Psychopath"	Lean, Pin Lau	Juliet The Orange (Brodwyn)	3:49
12.	"Bedroom Reprise"	Rossem, Charles	Nice Stupid Playground	1:22
Total length:				34:02

Information on artists and song writers.
Information on track listing and time.

== Charts ==
=== Album ===
Chart (1998)	Peak position
Billboard Malaysia	1

== Sources ==
- Billboard magazine. (Nielsen Business Media, Inc)110 (37). September 12, 1998. ISSN 0006-2510.
- Billboard magazine. (Nielsen Business Media, Inc)110 (39). September 26, 1998. ISSN 0006-2510.
- Billboard magazine. (Nielsen Business Media, Inc)110 (42). October 17, 1998. ISSN 0006-2510.
- Nuvich, Alexandra (April 5, 1997). "AIM sets sights on future". Billboard magazine. 109 (14). Nielsen Business Media, Inc: 92. ISSN 0006-2510.
- Nuvich, Alexandra (October 3, 1998). "A Positive Tone for Indie". Billboard magazine. 110 (40). Nielsen Business Media, Inc: 104. ISSN 0006-2510.
