= Xingkong =

Xingkong (Chinese: 星空; pinyin: Xīngkōng) may refer to:

- Xing Kong, Mandarin-language television channel based in Hong Kong
- Xingkong (camouflage), military camouflage pattern adopted by China's People's Liberation Army
- Sky (Malaysian TV series), 2007 series
- Starry Starry Night (film), 2011 Taiwanese film
