= Inilah Jac =

Album by Jaclyn Victor

Studio album by Jaclyn Victor
- Released: January 12, 2005
- Genre: Pop
- Label: Sony BMG Malaysia
- Producer: Aubrey Suwito, Audi Mok, Kieran Kuek, Azlan Abu Hassan, Aidit Alfian

Jaclyn Victor chronology
Gemilang (2005)	Inilah Jac (2005)	Jaclyn Victor III (2009)

Singles from Inilah Jac
- 1. "Cepat Cepat (feat. Mode)"; 2. "Ceritera Cinta (duet with Rio Febrian)"; 3. "Cinta Tiada Akhirnya"

Inilah Jac is the second album released in 2006 by Jaclyn Victor since winning Malaysian Idol. The album were re-released in August 2007, with new tracks and music videos.

== Track listing ==
No.	Title	Writer(s)	Producer(s)	Length
1.	"Inilah Masanya"	Audi Mok, Nurfatima	Audi Mok	3.37
2.	"Cinta Tiada Akhirnya"	Azlan Abu Hassan, Sulu Sarawak	Azlan Abu Hassan	4.26
3.	"Cepat-Cepat(featuring Mode)"	Mode	Kieran Kuek	3.42
4.	"Ceritera Cinta(duet with Rio Febrian)"	Ross Ariffin, Habsah Hassan	Aubrey Suwito	4.54
5.	"Layu Sebelum Berkembang"	A. Riyanto	Aubrey Suwito	3.46
6.	"Kasih Sayang"			4.12
7.	"Selagi Bertahan"	Azlan Abu Hassan, Amran Omar	Azlan Abu Hassan	3.48
8.	"Jealous(Featuring Reefa)"	Kieran	Kieran Kuek	3.46
9.	"Star (Old School Mix) (featuring Ebony Klan)"	Kieran	Kieran Kuek	3.37
10.	"Superwoman"	Kenny Edmonds, Antonio Reld, D.Simmons	Aubrey Suwito	5.13

=== Limited Edition (Re-Release, 2007) ===
No.	Title	Writer(s)	{{{extra_column}}}	Length
1.	"Satu Harapan"
2.	"Ipoh Mali (Point Blanc Featuring Jaclyn Victor)"
3.	"Cepat-Cepat(featuring Mode)"	Mode	Kieran Kuek	3.42
4.	"Ceritera Cinta(duet with Rio Febrian)"	Ross Ariffin, Habsah Hassan	Aubrey Suwito	4.54
5.	"Layu Sebelum Berkembang"	A. Riyanto	Aubrey Suwito	3.46
6.	"Kasih Sayang"			4.12
7.	"Selagi Bertahan"	Azlan Abu Hassan, Amran Omar	Azlan Abu Hassan	3.48
8.	"Jealous(Featuring Reefa)"	Kieran	Kieran Kuek	3.46
9.	"Star (Old School Mix) (featuring Ebony Klan)"	Kieran	Kieran Kuek	3.37
10.	"Superwoman"	Kenny Edmonds, Antonio Reld, D.Simmons	Aubrey Suwito	5.13
11.	"I Hope"
12.	"Gemilang"	Aubrey Suwito, Asmin Mudin
13.	"Satu Harapan (Minus One)"

The re-release version also features a VCD that includes music videos as follows:

1. "Satu Harapan" (Music Video; Version 1)
2. "Satu Harapan" (Music Video; Version 2)
3. "Ipoh Mali" (Music Video)
4. "Cepat-Cepat" (Music Video)
5. "Ceritera Cinta" (Music Video)
6. "Wajah" (Music Video)
7. "Gemilang" (Music Video)

== Awards ==
- Anugerah Industri Muzik 2007
  - Best Female Vocal Performance in an Album (Inilah Jac)
- Anugerah Juara Lagu Ke-22 (2008)
  - Best Vocals for "Ceritera Cinta" (with Lah)
  - Finalist in Ballad Category for "Ceritera Cinta"
- Redbox Karaoke Chart 2008 Awards
  - No 6 Ceritera Cinta
