= Dayang Nurfaizah =

Malaysian singer

- دايڠ نورفائزة
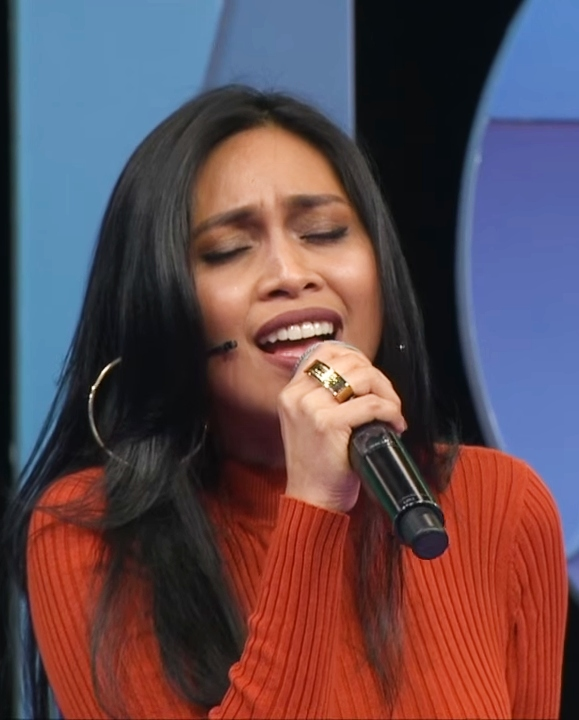
- Nurfaizah performing on MeleTOP in 2016.
- Born: Dayang Nurfaizah binti Awang Dowty; 20 July 1981 (age 45); Kuching, Sarawak, Malaysia
- Occupations: Singer; actress; record producer
- Years active: 1996–present
- Musical career
- Genres: Pop; R&B
- Instrument: Vocals
- Labels: DN & AD Entertainment; Broadway Entertainment; Delima Records

Dayang Nurfaizah binti Awang Dowty (born 20 July 1981) is a Malaysian singer and actress. Her debut self-titled album was released in May 1999 and it was recorded in the pop and R&B genres. The album's lead single, Hakikat Cinta introduced her to the local music industry.

During her fifth year in the Malaysian music industry, Nurfaizah set up her own recording company, DN & AD Entertainment Sdn Bhd. Under the label, on 31 October 2004 she released her fourth studio album, Dayang Sayang Kamu, which was received with rave reviews from the Malaysian public as well as neighboring countries.

In 2006, she participated in One in a Million, a singing competition hosted by Malaysian local television station 8TV. She ended up as one of the four finalists in the competition but was voted out by the Malaysian public on 15 September 2006, as the competition was determined by a 50% text message voting system.

== One in a Million ==
Throughout the competition, Dayang sang:

1. One Last Cry – Brian McKnight (Top 20)
2. Aku Cinta Padamu – Sheila Majid (Top 12)
3. Survivor – Destiny's Child (Top 10)
4. Crazy in Love – Beyoncé Knowles (Top 9)
5. Selamanya – Innuendo (Top 8)
6. Because You Loved Me – Celine Dion (Top 7)
7. Fever – Peggy Lee (Top 6)
8. Be Without You – Mary J. Blige (Top 6)
9. Gemilang – Jaclyn Victor (Top 5)
10. Dangerously in Love – Beyoncé Knowles (Top 5)
11. Buttons – Pussycat Dolls (Top 4)
12. My Boo – Usher feat. Alicia Keys (duet with VE) (Top 4)

== Discography ==
=== Albums ===
- Dayang Nurfaizah (7 May 1999)
- Seandainya Masih Ada Cinta (8 November 2000)
- Di Sini Bermula, re-released of her Debut album (3 February 2002)
- Hembusan Asmara (28 November 2002)
- Dayang Sayang Kamu (2004)
- Dayang Sayang Kamu (Repackaged) (2005)
- Kasih (28 November 2005)
- Buat Kamu, repackaged of Hembusan Asmara (2006)
- Dayang 20 07 (21 July 2007)
- Sayang & Cahaya (1 May 2011)
- Dayang Nurfaizah (7 April 2017)
- Belagu (12 February 2021)
- Belagu II (27 January 2023)
- Janji (22 November 2024)

=== Live albums ===
- Dayang Live (2009) (Live at Planet Hollywood in July 2008)
- Anuar & Dayang (2013) (Live at Petronas Philharmonic Hall)

=== Compilation albums ===
- Jelita Hebat (September 1999)
- Duet Gempak (2002)
- Ini Baru Gempaq (2002)
- Suara Hati pop R&B (2002)
- Nafas Baru (2003)
- The Best of Dayang Nurfaizah (24 September 2003)
- Best of The Best Anuar & Dayang (2004)
- Pujaan Pop Duet (2005)
- Tiada Lama, Tiada Baharu (2010)

=== Single ===
- Hakikat Cinta (1999)
- Seandainya Masih Ada Cinta (2000)
- Need A Break (2004)
- Luka (including in the Novel namely 'Luka') (12 March 2009)
- Ku Temu Cahaya (2010)
- Dayang & Marcell (2010)
- Perlukan Cinta (Featuring Tompi) (2011)
- Bisikan Rinduku (OST Drama "Dahlia")
- Di Pintu Syurga (OST Drama "Ariana Rose")
- Langit Cinta (OST Filem Langit Cinta)
- Tak Pernah Menyerah (2015 - OST Dawai Asmara)
- Lelaki Teragung (2016 - OST 7 Hari Mencintaiku)
- Separuh Mati Ku Bercinta (2017 - OST Pinggan Tak Retak Nasi Tak Dingin)
- Haram (2018 - Hael Husaini ft Dayang Nurfaizah)
- Sebentar (2019)

=== VCD/MTV Karaoke ===
- Hits MTV Karaoke Koleksi Dengan Vocal Original (2002)
- Dayang MTV Karaoke (2006)
- Dayang Ingin Ku Miliki MTV Karaoke (2008)

=== Greatest Hit Songs ===
- Hakikat Cinta
- Kembalilah Sayang
- Rindu
- Pusaka Rimba (Duet with Ziana Zain)
- Seandainya Masih Ada Cinta
- Sekali Lagi
- Sedingin Mana Cintamu
- Di Sini Bermula
- Hujan Lagi Hati Ini
- Rindu Bayangan (Duet with Dino, Dayang's Brother)
- Pintaku Yang Terakhir
- Hembusan Asmara
- Mana Mungkin
- Dayang Sayang Kamu
- Melerai Prasangka
- Erti Hidup
- Kasih Maafkan
- Kasih
- Saat Yang Bahagia
- Ingin Ku Miliki
- Hilang
- Luka
- Sayang (Duet With Marcell)
- Ku Temu Cahaya
- Perlukan Cinta (Featuring Tompi)
- Bisikan Rinduku (OST Drama "Dahlia")
- Di Pintu Syurga (OST Drama "Ariana Rose")
- Tak Pernah Menyerah
- Langit Cinta (OST Film "Langit Cinta")
- Lelaki Teragung (New Single/ Winner AJL31)
- Haram (ft. Hael Husaini - New Single/Winner AJL 33)

=== Other Songs ===
- Selamat Hari Raya (2002)
- Kepulangan Yang Dinanti (2002)
- Taurus (Penawar Rindu) by Imran Ajmain (Featuring Altimet & Dayang Nurfaizah) (2007)
- Losing Me (12 March 2009)
- Lately (Global One Music) (4 May 2009)
- Tanpamu (Feat. Daly Ahli Fiqir) (Global One Music) (4 May 2009)
- Pulang (2009)
- Lil' Secret By Liang (Featuring Dayang Nurfaizah) (2009)
- Syukur Selalu (feat. Black Hanifah - 2015)

== Awards, accolades and achievements ==
=== Anugerah Industri Muzik ===
Anugerah Industri Muzik Malaysia (AIM)
| Year | Category | Nominated Work | Album | Result |
|---|---|---|---|---|
| 1999 (AIM 7) | Best New Artist | | Dayang Nurfaizah | Nominated |
| 1999 (AIM 7) | Best Song | Pusaka Rimba (duet Ziana Zain) (Azlan Abu Hassan / Azalea) | Jelita Hebat | Nominated |
| 2000 (AIM 8) | Best Vocal Performance in an Album (Female) | | Seandainya Masih Ada Cinta | Nominated |
| 2000 (AIM 8) | Best Pop Album | | Seandainya Masih Ada Cinta | Nominated |
| 2000 (AIM 8) | Best Song | Seandainya Masih Ada Cinta (Ajai / Syed EnV) | Seandainya Masih Ada Cinta | Won |
| 2002 (AIM 10) | Best Vocal Performance in an Album (Female) | | Hembusan Asmara | Nominated |
| 2002 (AIM 10) | Best Pop Album | | Hembusan Asmara | Nominated |
| 2005 (AIM 13) | Best Engineered Album | | Kasih | Won |
| 2005 (AIM 13) | Best Pop Album | | Kasih | Nominated |
| 2007 (AIM 15) | Best Album Cover | Designer: Nizam Rahmat | 20 07 | Nominated |
| 2007 (AIM 15) | Best Pop Album | | 20 07 | Nominated |
| 2007 (AIM 15) | Best Vocal Performance in an Album (Female) | | 20 07 | Nominated |
| 2007 (AIM 15) | Best Musical Arrangements in a Song | Inginku Miliki; Arranger: Audi Mok | 20 07 | Nominated |
| 2009/2010 (AIM 17) | Best Vocal Performance in a Song (Female) | Hilang (Live Version) | Live! | Nominated |
| 2009/2010 (AIM 17) | Best Engineered Album | | Live! | Nominated |
| 2009/2010 (AIM 17) | Best Pop Album | | Live! | Won |
| 2009/2010 (AIM 17) | Best Album | | Live! | Nominated |
| 2010/2011 (AIM 18) | Best Duo/Group Vocal Performance in a Song | Sayang (with Marcell Siahan) | Sayang & Cahaya | Nominated |
| 2010/2011 (AIM 18) | Best Album | | Sayang & Cahaya | Nominated |
| 2012/2013 (AIM 20) | Best Musical Arrangements in a Song | Bila Resah; Arranger: Jenny Chin | Anuar & Dayang Live at Petronas Philharmonic Hall | Won |
| 2012/2013 (AIM 20) | Best Duo/Collaboration Vocal Performance in a Song | Sedetik Lebih (dengan Anuar Zain) | Anuar & Dayang Live at Petronas Philharmonic Hall | Won |
| 2012/2013 (AIM 20) | Best Vocal Performance in a Song (Female) | Seandainya Masih Ada Cinta (live) | Anuar & Dayang Live at Petronas Philharmonic Hall | Won |
| 2012/2013 (AIM 20) | Best Album | | Anuar & Dayang Live at Petronas Philharmonic Hall | Nominated |
| 2014/2016 (AIM 22) | Best Vocal Performance in a Song (Female) | Lelaki Teragung | | Nominated |

=== Anugerah Juara Lagu ===
Anugerah Juara Lagu (AJL)
| Year | Song | Album | Composer(s) | Lyricist(s) | Category | Result |
|---|---|---|---|---|---|---|
| 2001 (AJL 16) | Seandainya Masih Ada Cinta | Seandainya Masih Ada Cinta | Ajai | Syed ENV | Ballad | Won Winner of Category |
| 2001 (AJL 16) | Bahagia | Seandainya Masih Ada Cinta | Ajai | Syed ENV | Pop Rock | Nominated |
| 2004 (AJL 19) | Erti Hidup | Dayang Sayang Kamu | Afdlin Shauki & Aji | Afdlin Shauki | Ethnic | Won Winner of Category |
| 2014 (AJL 29) | Di Pintu Syurga | Dayang Nurfaizah | Tam Spider | Iman Imran | Open | Won 2nd Runner-Up |
| 2014 (AJL 29) | Di Pintu Syurga | Dayang Nurfaizah | | | Best Vocal | Won |
| 2015 (AJL 30) | Tak Pernah Menyerah | Dayang Nurfaizah | Akid | Pojie Samad | Open | Nominated |
| 2015 (AJL 30) | Tak Pernah Menyerah | Dayang Nurfaizah | | | Best Vocal | Won |
| 2016 (AJL31) | Lelaki Teragung | Dayang Nurfaizah | Natashah | Iman Imran | Open | Won Champion |
| 2016 (AJL31) | Lelaki Teragung | Dayang Nurfaizah | | | Best Vocal | Won |
| 2017 (AJL 31) | Separuh Mati Ku Bercinta | Dayang Nurfaizah | Ajai | Ajai | Open | Nominated |
| 2019 (AJL 33) | Haram | Hael Husaini & Dayang Nurfaizah | Hael Husaini & Ezra Kong | Hael Husaini & Ezra Kong | Open | Won Champion |

=== 1996 ===
- Golden Teen Search 1996 Finalist (Radio Televisyen Malaysia)
- Bintang Remaja 1996 Finalist (Kuching, Sarawak)
- Bintang Remaja Asli 1996 Champion (Kuching, Sarawak)

=== 1997 ===
- Bintang Remaja 1997 Champion (Kuching, Sarawak)
- Golden Teen Search 1997 Champion (Radio Televisyen Malaysia)

=== 2001 ===
- Winner of Bintang Penghibur HMI, 2001
- Best Fashion Bintang penghibur HMI 2001
- Most Popular Song (Seandainya Masih Ada Cinta) APM 2001
- Top 5 Finalist for Most Popular Female Singer ABP 2001
- Top 5 Finalist for Choice of Pop Song (Seandainya Masih Ada Cinta) ERA Award 2001

=== 2002 ===
- Winner of Konsert Hitz Pilihan Pendengar RMKL 2002
- 1st Runner-up for Best Performance Konsert Hitz Pilihan Pendengar RMKL 2002

=== 2005 ===
- Top 5 Finalist for Choice of Female Vocal ERA Award 2005
- Top 5 Finalist for Choice of Pop Song (Dayang Sayang Kamu) ERA Award 2005
- Winner of Choice of Ethnic Song (Erti Hidup) ERA Award 2005
- Finalist at HITZ1 2005 (Dayang Sayang Kamu)
- Top 5 Finalist for Most Popular Female Singer ABP 2005

=== 2006 ===
- Top 5 Finalist for Choice of Pop Song (Kasih) ERA Award 2006
- Top 5 Finalist for Choice of Music Video (Kasih Maafkan) ERA Award 2006
- Top 5 Finalist for Choice of Female Vocal ERA Award 2006
- Top 5 Finalist for Best Album (Dayang Sayang Kamu) APM 2006
- Top 5 Finalist for Best Female Vocal APM 2006

=== 2008 ===
- Top 5 Finalist for Best Female Artist – APM 2008

=== 2017 ===
- Artis Wanita Terbaik Anugerah Planet Muzik 2017
- Lagu Terbaik (Malaysia) - Lelaki Teragung Anugerah Planet Muzik 2017
