= Daniel Lee Chee Hun (album) =

2005 album by Daniel Lee Chee Hun

Daniel 李吉漢

Studio album by Daniel 李吉漢
- Released: November 2005 (Malaysia)
- Recorded: September/October 2005
- Genre: Pop
- Length: 46:54
- Label: Sony BMG Malaysia

Daniel 李吉漢 chronology
Mimpi (2005)	Daniel 李吉漢 (2005)	Daniel Celebration Edition 慶功收藏版 (2006)

Daniel 李吉漢 is the self-titled debut album released by the winner of Malaysian Idol 2, Daniel Lee Chee Hun. Released in November 2005, the album achieved platinum status after sales exceeded 25,000 units within six months. It included 10 songs, including seven songs in Mandarin, one in English, and his hit "Mimpi" sung in both Malay and Mandarin.

== Celebration Edition ==
Daniel Celebration Edition 慶功收藏版 / 庆功收藏版

Studio album by Daniel 李吉漢
- Released: 2006 (Malaysia)
- Genre: Pop
- Label: Sony BMG Malaysia

Daniel 李吉漢 chronology
Daniel 李吉漢 (2005)	Daniel Celebration Edition 慶功收藏版 / 庆功收藏版 (2006)	Unavoidable 躲不過 (2007)

Daniel Celebration Edition 慶功收藏版 (Pinyin: Qìng Gōng Shōu Cáng Bǎn) was introduced to the market in 2006 to mark the achievement of sales of the self-titled debut album of Daniel Lee Chee Hun (winner of Malaysian Idol 2), at more than 25,000 copies, which is accorded as platinum status.

This celebration edition contains two discs. The first one consists of all 10 songs from Danell's first album. The second disc contains MVs of four of Danell's songs and a "Behind The Scenes" video clip showing the work of Danell's shooting of his MVs plus a personal message delivered by Daniel himself.

== Track listing ==
1. 飛 (Fēi / Fly)
2. 選擇 (Xuǎn Zé / The Choice)
3. 有機 (Yǒu Jī / Organic Love)
4. I Don't Know
5. 現在，很想見你 (Xiàn Zài, Hěn Xiǎng Jiàn Nǐ / I Love To See You Now)
6. 無法自拔 (Wú Fǎ Zì Bá / Irresistible)
7. 幸運兒 (Xìng Yùn Ér / The Lucky One)
8. 第二次童年 (Dì Èr Cì Tóng Nián / Second Childhood)
9. Heaven Knows
10. Mimpi (Dream)

== Video CD MV listing ==
1. 飛 (Fēi / Fly)
2. 有機 (Yǒu Jī / Organic Love)
3. 現在，很想見你 (Xiàn Zài, Hěn Xiǎng Jiàn Nǐ / I Love To See You Now)
4. 幸運兒 (Xìng Yùn Ér / The Lucky One)

BONUS: Behind The Scenes 幕後花絮 (Mù Hòu Huā Xù)

== Background ==
Daniel's debut album is the first of its kind for a Malaysian Chinese singer, consisting of songs in 3 languages widely spoken in Malaysia. The first 8 songs are in Mandarin, while the 9th and last songs are in English and Malay respectively. It is believed to be the very first Mandarin album to include romanized Pinyin lyrics for those whose native tongue is not Mandarin.

Fly 飛 is the Mandarin version of the last and only Malay song in the album, Mimpi. The latter song was sung by Daniel himself during the Grand Finale of Malaysian Idol 2.

Heaven Knows is an existing English song sung by Rick Price. It is also one of the three songs sung by Daniel during the Grand Finale of Malaysian Idol 2, aside Mimpi and Angin Malam (Angin Malam is recorded in Danell's 2nd album Unavoidable 躲不過.

Within six months of release of the album, it sold at more than 25,000 copies, thereby reaching platinum status, resulting in the production of a celebration edition, Daniel Celebration Edition 慶功收藏版, containing MVs of 4 of his songs and a mini photo album of himself in various dressing styles.

In the MV for I Love To See You Now 現在，很想見你, Daniel plays as a waiter in a modern-day kopitiam (local Chinese coffeeshop), who falls asleep, dreams of a beautiful girl and wakes up only to find the dream girl standing before him. The dream girl is played by local Malaysian artiste Stella Chung (钟晓玉 Zhōng Xiǎo Yù), who is also the younger sister of a local Malaysian singer. Stella herself starred in Malaysia's Media Prima-Singapore's MediaCorp jointly produced television drama, The Beginning 原点 (Yuán Diǎn), as Shí Tínglì (石婷立). The drama was broadcast via Malaysian private channel ntv7 in October 2006 and Singaporean leading Mandarin channel, Channel 8, in May 2007.

Daniel never performed an MV for "The Choice 選擇", the sole rock song from his debut album. However, he did an on-stage performance for the song by singing and dancing simultaneously for the first time at the Summer 8 Live Concert 2006 (夏日8度演唱会 2006) at Danga Bay, Johor, a mass concert gathering Chinese singers from Malaysia, Singapore, Hong Kong and Taiwan, organized by Malaysian private channel, 8TV.
