= Jaclyn Victor III =

Studio album by Jaclyn Victor
- Released: August 20, 2009
- Genres: Pop, hip-hop, R&B
- Label: Sony Music Malaysia
- Producers: Aubrey Suwito, Sharon Paul, Nai Kong, Anjang Jinbara, Gjie 6ixth Sense, Syed Nitrus

Jaclyn Victor chronology
Inilah Jac (2006)	Jaclyn Victor III (2009)	3 Suara (2011)

Singles from Jaclyn Victor III
- 1. "Bertamu Di Kalbu"; 2. "Ku Tak Bisa"

Jaclyn Victor III is a studio album by Jaclyn Victor. The album was released in 2009 by Sony Music Entertainment Malaysia.

== Track listing ==
No.	Title	Lyrics	Music	Length
1.	"Koleksi Gemilang" (olahan Nai Kong)			10:01
2.	"Jatuh Cinta"	Panji	Panji	4:17
3.	"Bertamu di Kalbu"	Anjang	Anjang	4:32
4.	"Senandung Beradu"	Tinta S.	Aubrey Suwito	4:30
5.	""Ku Tak Bisa"	Boy Razak	Boy Razak	4:51
6.	"Ku Ingin Mu"	Sulu Sarawak	Sharon Paul	4:08
7.	"Biarlah"	Nurfatima	Syed Nitrus	4:08
8.	"Tentangmu"	Gjie	Gjie	3:12

"Koleksi Gemilang" is a medley of 24 Malaysian songs, and is a tribute from Jac to the music industry. Some of the 24 songs are Warisan Wanita Terakhir, Kau Ilham Ku, Kamelia, Sekadar Di Pinggiran, Terasing, Gadis Melayu, Di Sana Menanti Di Sini Menunggu, Menaruh Harapan, Aku Cinta Padamu and more.
