= Sarah (album) =

Studio album by Siti Sarah
- Released: 23 August 2002
- Recorded: 2001 – 2002
- Studios: NAR Studio; Groove Works Studio
- Genres: Pop, R&B
- Length: 41:26
- Label: NAR Records
- Producers: Ajai; Azmeer; Along Exists; Edrie Hashim; Aidit Alfian; Neves Pretty Ugly; Helen Yap; Aalva Jitab; Belle Fatah

Siti Sarah chronology
Sarah (2002)	Mimpi Pun Sama (2003)

Singles from Sarah
- 1. "Kesetiaan" Released: 2002; 2. "Ku Teruskan" Released: 2002; 3. "Ke Hujung Dunia" Released: 2003; 4. "Pesan Mamaku" Released: 2003

Sarah is a debut studio album by Malaysian singer, Siti Sarah, released on 23 August 2002 by NAR Records. The album is the debut of her after participated in both Bintang RTM and Bintang URTV. The album composed almost entirely of pop and ballad genre with its notable singles like "Kesetiaan", "Ku Teruskan" dan "Ke Hujung Dunia".

== Production ==
Following her participant at Bintang RTM and Bintang URTV, Siti Sarah was approached by NAR Records in late 2001. They offered her a chance to record her first studio album and eventually working with renowned composers and producers like Ajai, Azmeer and Aidit Alfian. Siti Sarah performed the vocals on all tracks and provided backing vocals on only one track.

On the album, she was joined by musicians including Edrie Hashim who plays electric guitars, Kelly, Nassier Abu Kassim and Surya Booty on bass, Ujang Exists and Gary Gideon on drums and Coni Soliano who plays trumpet for the song "Pesan Mamaku". The album was recorded primarily on NAR Studios and Groove Works Studios, produced by Azmeer, Along Exists, Edrie Hashim and Aidit Alfian among others. The mastering process was done by Faisal Ghazali at the Synchrosound Mastering in Petaling Jaya, Selangor.

== Release and reception ==
The album was released on 23 August 2002 to popular success, with "Kesetiaan" released as its lead single. "Ku Teruskan", "Ke Hujung Dunia" and "Pesan Mamaku" were released as further singles. Music videos were produced for the album, for the songs "Kesetiaan", "Ku Teruskan" and "Ke Hujung Dunia". The album was well-received, sold 10,000 copies and received critical praise upon its release. It also earned Siti Sarah three awards including the Best Album category at the 10th Anugerah Industri Muzik in 2003.

== Track listing ==
No.	Title	Writer(s)	Length
1.	"Ku Teruskan"	Ajai; Musrad	4:37
2.	"Hai Kawan"	G-Nola; Musrad	4:27
3.	"Kesetiaan"	Ajai; Musrad	4:16
4.	"Rembulan di Taj Mahal"	Edrie Hashim; Loloq	4:03
5.	"Kata Cinta"	Azmeer; Loloq	4:24
6.	"Ke Hujung Dunia"	Aidit Alfian; Ad Samad	4:59
7.	"Cemburu"	Neves (Pretty Ugly)	4:20
8.	"Damaikan Asmaraku"	Patrick Kamis; Hazida	3:55
9.	"Hasrat Cinta"	Aalva Jitab; Taha	4:34
10.	"Pesan Mamaku"	Helen Yap; Loloq	3:51
Total length:			41:26

== Certifications ==
Country	Certification	Sales/Shipments
Malaysia	Sold out	10,000
