= Mimpi Pun Sama =

Studio album by Siti Sarah
- Released: 3 December 2003
- Recorded: 2003
- Studio: NAR Studio; Groove Works Studio; Neo Digital Studio
- Genre: Pop, R&B
- Length: 43:59
- Label: NAR Records
- Producer: Along Exists; Azlan Abu Hassan; Edrie Hashim; Sharon Paul; Neves Pretty Ugly; Ajai; Helen Yap; Aidit Alfian

Siti Sarah chronology
Sarah (2002)	Mimpi Pun Sama (2003)	Tiada Dikau Tiada Makna (2005)

Singles from Mimpi Pun Sama
- 1. "Jangan Kau Mimpi" Released: 2003; 2. "Saat Hilang Cintamu" Released: 2004; 3. "Lagi Lagu Cinta" Released: 2004

Mimpi Pun Sama is the second studio album by Malaysian singer, Siti Sarah, released on 3 December 2003 by NAR Records. The album, which had a retro influences, was well received.

== Production ==
After the success of her self-titled debut album, Siti Sarah began collecting and recorded the material for the album in early 2003. After a period of introspection and contemplation, she decided to stick with retro music influences. Ajai, who previously worked on Sarah's debut album, composed two songs – "Saat Hilang Cintamu" and "Selami Perasaanku". Although she was concerned that the album has the same tune as her debut, Sarah convinced that Mimpi Pun Sama tested her vocal abilities. The album was produced by Along Exists, Azlan Abu Hassan, Edrie Hashim and Sharon Paul as well as Neves Pretty Ugly and Aidit Alfian.

== Release and reception ==
The album was released on 3 December 2003. To promote the album, "Jangan Kau Mimpi", "Saat Hilang Cintamu", "Lagi Lagu Cinta" and "Tinggalkan Diriku" were released as singles. The album was well-received and sold 12,000 copies. She also went on to promote the album throughout West Malaysia as well as Sabah and Sarawak.

A reviewer from Harian Metro found the album "still maintains the same concept" as Sarah's debut album, and "the song selection is more solid with neat musical arrangements and, most importantly, it's pleasant to listen to". Faridul Anwar Farinordin from the New Straits Times considered it a soulful work from her.

== Track listing ==
No.	Title	Writer(s)	Length
1.	"Ke Sisi Ku"	G-Nola, Tessh RS	4:31
2.	"Dikaulah Ratu"	Azlan Abu Hassan	4:42
3.	"Saat Hilang Cintamu"	Ajai, Musrad	4:05
4.	"Jangan Kau Mimpi"	Neves Pretty Ugly	3:47
5.	"Kenangi Daku"	Sharon Paul, Lew Mable	4:30
6.	"Selami Perasaanku"	Ajai, Slen	4:44
7.	"Lagi Lagu Cinta"	Edrie Hashim	4:25
8.	"Izin Darinya"	Azmeer, Musrad	4:20
9.	"Mimpi Pun Sama"	Helen Yap, Loloq	2:37
10.	"Tinggalkan Diriku"	Aidit Alfian	4:58
Total length:			43:59

== Certifications ==
Country	Certification	Sales/Shipments
Malaysia	Sold out	12,000
