= Dayang Sayang Kamu =

Studio album by Dayang Nurfaizah
- Released: 31 October 2004
- Genre: R&B
- Label: DN & AD Ent Sdn Bhd

Dayang Sayang Kamu is the fourth studio album by Malaysian recording artist Dayang Nurfaizah. It was released on 31 October 2004 by her company, DN & AD Entertainment Sdn Bhd. The album was fully self-financed by Dayang herself due to the legal problems that she had faced with her previous record label, Broadway Entertainment.

Dayang Sayang Kamu was nominated for Best Album in Anugerah Planet Muzik 2006.

== Track listing ==
1. "Dayang Sayang Kamu" featuring Cat Farish (Cat Farish / Cat Farish)
2. "Aku Rindu Aku Jemu" (Lah / Lah)
3. "Ku Inginmu Kembali" (Damian Shortysoul & James M. Baum / James M. Baum & Farasha Osman)
4. "Andai Ku Tahu" (Acis / Tris)
5. "Lagu Cinta" (Denny Saba / Denny Saba)
6. "Seketika" (James M. Baum & Damian Shortysoul / James M. Baum & Farasha Osman)
7. "Kau Pergi Jua" (Akhbar Nawab / Lydia)
8. "Cinta Tiada Lain" (Acis / Tris)
9. "Coretan Cinta" (Hazami / Hazami)
10. "Ku Setia" (Johan Farid Khairuddin & Azlan Abu Hassan / Mohariz Yaakup)
11. "Biar Akhirnya Di Sini" featuring Henry Lamirri (Afdlin Shauki/ Afdlin Shauki)
12. "Erti Hidup" (Afdlin Shauki & Aji / Afdlin Shauki)
