= Tiada Dikau Tiada Makna =

Studio album by Siti Sarah
- Released: June 2005
- Recorded: 2004 – 2005
- Studio: NAR Studio
- Genres: Pop, R&B
- Length: 48:14
- Label: NAR Records
- Producers: Musrad; Fauzi Marzuki; Roslan Aziz; Adnan Abu Hassan

Siti Sarah chronology
Mimpi Pun Sama (2004)	Tiada Dikau Tiada Makna (2005)	Suatu Perjalanan (2008)

Singles from Tiada Dikau Tiada Makna
- 1. "Bersamamu" Released: 2005; 2. "Menari Denganku" Released: 2005; 3. "Tinggal Serpihan" Released: 2006

Tiada Dikau Tiada Makna is the third and final studio album by Malaysian singer, Siti Sarah, released in June 2005 by NAR Records.

== Production ==
The album was recorded primarily at NAR Studios in Taman Tun Dr. Ismail, Kuala Lumpur. The album was preceded by a duet with Jamal Abdillah, "Sandarkan Pada Kenangan", which was released as a single in 2003 (almost 2 years before the album's release). Unlike her first two albums, which had 10 songs, Tiada Dikau Tiada Makna had 12 songs. "Menari Denganku", the last song recorded for the album, features a duet with the first runner-up of second season of Akademi Fantasia, Zahid Baharuddin.

On the album, Siti Sarah were joined by musicians like Kelly on bass, Ujang Exists on drums and Amir Sulaiman on tambourine. Backing vocals were provided by Hazami, Neves Pretty Ugly and Azlan Abu Hassan. Tiada Dikau Tiada Makna would be the last studio album Siti Sarah recorded and released prior to her death from COVID-19, 16 years later.

== Release and reception ==
The album was released in June 2005 and was well-received. To promote the album, "Bersamamu", "Menari Denganku" and "Tinggal Serpihan" were released as singles.

== Track listing ==
No.	Title	Writer(s)	Composer	Length
1.	"Tiada Dikau Tiada Makna"	Hazami	Hazami	4:11
2.	"Menari Denganku" (feat. Zahid Baharuddin)	Neves Pretty Ugly	Neves Pretty Ugly	4:04
3.	"Cuma Permainanmu"	Hazami	Hazami	4:06
4.	"Tinggal Serpihan"	Musrad	G. Nola	4:29
5.	"Kembara Kita"	Darwish	Jason Voo	5:00
6.	"Kasihku Tunggu"	Musrad	Ajai	4:20
7.	"Perihal Cinta Sejati"	Musrad	G. Nola	4:11
8.	"Pesona Bicara"	Faris	Adnan Abu Hassan	4:09
9.	"Cinta Usia Kita"	Raja Alawiah Idris	Ajai	4:40
10.	"Malis Cinta"	Ucu	Azlan Abu Hassan	4:12
11.	"Sandarkan Pada Kenangan" (feat. Jamal Abdillah)	M. Nasir	M. Nasir	4:48
12.	"Bersamamu"	Affendy	Affendy	4:08
Total length:				48:14
