= Nikki Palikat =

Malaysian musician (born 1985)

- Born: Nicolette Louisa Palikat; 1 November 1985 (age 40); Berrien Springs, Michigan, U.S.
- Occupations: Singer; actor
- Spouse: Audi Mok (m. 2009; div. 2021)
- Children: 1
- Musical career
- Origin: Tambunan, Sabah, Malaysia
- Genres: Pop; R&B; soul
- Years active: 2004–present
- Labels: Artistes United Records
- Website: nikkimusic.com.my

Nicolette Louisa Palikat (born 1 November 1985) is a Malaysian American singer from Tambunan, Sabah. She reached top 12 in the first season of Malaysian Idol. Nikki is known for her vocal belting and her ability to sing in the whistle register.

== Career ==
While a university student, she successfully auditioned for Malaysian Idol in Kuching, Sarawak, impressing the judges with her rendition of Mariah Carey's Emotions. She eventually progressed through to the 'Final 12' of the competition. After six weeks, Nikki was voted out on 12 September 2004 to some controversy, as she had been seen as a favourite to win by Malaysian Idol judge, Paul Moss.

The following lists Nikki's Malaysian Idol performances:

- Audition – Emotions – (Mariah Carey)
- Workshop – One Moment in Time – (Whitney Houston)
- Wildcard – The Voice Within – (Christina Aguilera)
- Top 12 – Crazy in Love – (Beyoncé)
- Top 10 – I Want You Back – (The Jackson 5)
- Top 8 – Against All Odds – (Phil Collins)
- Top 7 – I'm with You – (Avril Lavigne)
- Top 6 – Emotion – (Destiny's Child)

Originally planning to continue with her studies after her exit from the competition, Nikki secured a recording contract with Artistes United Records and released her debut album, Maharani, in Malaysia on 28 November 2005. The title means 'Empress' in Malay. This album showcases Nikki's abilities in the whistle register, with one critic mentioning it as "whistling a la Mariah Carey." The ballad 'Pinta' marked Nikki's official debut in the music industry.

Nikki's second single, Caramu in which she collaborated with fellow artiste, Zahid, won an award for the best vocal duo category at the Anugerah Era 2006, a Malaysian music awards ceremony.

Following Caramu, Nikki teamed up with fellow Malaysian and Sabahan singer, Yanie, and both featured in Ning Baizura's August single release, Drama.

On 28 December 2008, Nikki released her second album, Hawa featuring the singles "Relakan" and "Selamat Tinggal".

== Personal life ==
Palikat married Malaysian music composer and producer Audi Mok in June 2009. They have one son. In 2022, she revealed that she and Mok had split back in March 2021.

Palikat is Catholic.

== Discography ==
Albums

- Maharani (2005)
- Hawa (2008)

Singles

- Caramu
- Imaginasi
- Drama
- Relakan
- Selamat Tinggal
- Cantik
- Belas-Mu
- Hawa
- Sudah (OST Derhaka Sebuah Cinta)
- Usah Najiskan Cinta Ini (OST Jangan Lupa Janji)
- Dugaan Takdir Cinta (with Afif Tirmizie) (OST Takdir Itu Milik Aku)

== Filmography ==
=== Television series ===
Year	Title	Role	TV channel
2017	Dendam Aurora	Laura	Astro Prima
2018	Selamat Malam Tan Sri	Puspa	TV2
