= Gemilang =

Studio album by Jaclyn Victor
- Released: January 12, 2005
- Genre: Pop
- Label: Sony BMG Malaysia
- Producers: Aubrey Suwito, Ajai, Azlan Abu Hassan, Edrie Hashim, Jenny Chin, Mohariz Yaakup, Ramli MS & Aidit Alfian

Jaclyn Victor chronology
Dream (2002)	Gemilang (2005)	Inilah Jac (2006)

Singles from Gemilang
- 1. "Gemilang"; 2. "Di Bawah Pohon Asmara"

Gemilang is an album released in 2005 by Jaclyn Victor, the first Malaysian Idol. This album has eleven tracks, including Tunggu Sekejap, When I Fall in Love and Gemilang, the three songs performed by Jaclyn Victor which eventually led to her winning the inaugural competition.

== History ==
"Gemilang", the first track, was composed by Aubrey Suwito, an award-winning composer. After hitting the stores across Malaysia, Gemilang sold thousands of CDs, achieving gold status within days. This CD topped the charts of ERA fm, hitz.fm, and other local charts, surpassing those of many other famous local artists. The album has sold 20,000 copies to date.

== Track listing ==
No.	Title	Writer(s)	Producer(s)	Length
1.	"Gemilang"	Aubrey Suwito, Asmin Mudin	Ramli MS	3.14
2.	"Cuma Setia"	Azlan Abu Hassan, Mohariz Yaakup	Azlan Abu Hassan	3.35
3.	"Padamu Permataku"	Azlan Abu Hassan, Mohariz Yaakup	Azlan Abu Hassan	4.04
4.	"Di Bawah Pohon Asmara"	Aidit Alfian	Aidit Alfian	4.38
5.	"Tiada Lagi Indah"	Ajai, Abie	Ajai	4.14
6.	"Love"	Johan Nawawi, Shah Shamsiri	Mohariz Yaakup	3.27
7.	"Bring Out The Best In Me"	Johan Aberg, Winston Sela, Paul Rein	Aalva Jitab, Edrie Hashim	3.56
8.	"Impian"	Hazami, CK Ismail	Edrie Hashim	4.14
9.	"When I Fall in Love"	Victor Young, Edward Heyman	Jenny Chin	4.09
10.	"Tunggu Sekejap"	P. Ramlee	Ramli MS	4.05
11.	"Gemilang (live; bonus track)"	Aubrey Suwito, Asmin Mudin	Aubrey Suwito, Sunil Kumar, Michael Simon, Ahmad Izham Omar	3.56

== Additional information ==
- Executive Producer: Gumilang Ramadhan
- Recording Studios: Kenny Music Studio, Grooveworks Studio, Nearfield Studio of Red Room Studio, Babyboss Studio
- Album Cover Design: Nizam (Ad.verse)

== Awards ==
- Anugerah Industri Muzik 2005
  - Best Music Arrangement (Song: Gemilang)
  - Best New Artist
  - Best Pop Album
  - Best Album
- Carta Hits 1 (2005)
  - Best Song for Gemilang
  - Best Showmanship
- Anugerah Juara Lagu 2005
  - Overall winner, for Gemilang
  - Winner of the Ballad Category, Gemilang
