= Wajah, Helmand =

Village in Afghanistan

Wajah وجه
- Village
- Location in Afghanistan
- Coordinates: 30°32′59″N 63°28′47″E
- Country: Afghanistan
- Province: Helmand Province
- Time zone: + 4.30

Wajah or Waja (Arabic: وجه) is a village in Helmand Province, in southwestern Afghanistan.

== See also ==
- Helmand Province
