= Aishah (singer) =

Malaysian singer and politician

Yang Berbahagia Dato' Wan Aishah Wan Ariffin DBNS
- عائشة عارفين
- Born: Wan Aishah binti Wan Ariffin; 3 January 1965 (age 61); Jempol, Negeri Sembilan, Malaysia
- Education: University of Auckland
- Occupations: Singer-songwriter; actress; politician
- Years active: 1983–present
- Musical career
- Genres: Pop; Pop rock; Dance-pop; R&B; Malaysian popular; nasheed
- Instrument: Vocals
- Labels: CBS (1984–1996); BMG (1990–2004); Sony BMG (2004–2008); Sony Music Entertainment Malaysia (1990–present)
- Formerly of: Aishah and the Fan Club

Wan Aishah binti Wan Ariffin (Jawi: وان عائشة بنت وان عارفين; born 3 January 1965), known mononymously as Aishah, is a singer, actress, and politician from Negeri Sembilan, Malaysia.

== Music career ==
Aishah first achieved stardom in New Zealand, when Sensation, her first album with her band Aishah and The Fan Club, raised her name as Malaysia's first successful female singer on the international stage. She joined the pop rock band while she was studying in New Zealand in the 1980s.

"Don't Let Me Fall Alone", a single from their second album Respect the Beat, received considerable airplay on some of the USA's largest and most influential Top 40 stations and a positive review in Billboard.

After leaving Fan Club, Aishah returned to Malaysia as a solo artist, and was appointed as one of the country's pop legends with a row of hit songs and best-selling albums. By 2016, Aishah had released 11 solo albums.

In 2010, Aishah made a comeback with stage shows and an album. Her songs and style of music changed from R&B to nasheed spiritual songs.

She re-entered the Malaysian music industry when she contested and became champion in the reality show singing competition organised by Astro, Gegar Vaganza Season 4 in 2017 which was open to artists from the 1980s to 2000s.

== Political career ==
In 2011, she became involved in politics by joining Pan-Malaysian Islamic Party (PAS) and contested for the parliamentary seat in Jempol, Negeri Sembilan in the 2013 Malaysian general election, which she lost to Barisan Nasional (BN) candidate, former Menteri Besar Mohd Isa Abdul Samad with a majority of 8629 votes. Later she joined the PAS splinter but progressive new party, National Trust Party (AMANAH) after its inception in 2015, a component of Pakatan Harapan (PH) coalition.

== Election results ==
Parliament of Malaysia
Year	Constituency	Candidate	Votes	Pct	Opponent(s)	Votes	Pct	Ballots cast	Majority	Turnout
2013	P127 Jempol	Wan Aishah Wan Ariffin (PAS)	22,495	41.95%	Mohd Isa Abdul Samad (UMNO)	31,124	58.05%	54,858	8,629	54,858%

== Honours ==
- Negeri Sembilan
  - Knight of the Order of Loyal Service to Negeri Sembilan (DBNS) – Dato' (2022)

== See also ==
- Music of Malaysia
- Malaysian pop
