= Daniel Lee Chee Hun =

- Born: Daniel Lee Chee Hun (李吉汉); 1 July 1982 (age 43); Changlun, Kedah, Malaysia
- Occupation: Singer
- Years active: 2005–present

Chinese name
- Traditional Chinese: 李桀漢
- Simplified Chinese: 李桀汉
Transcriptions
Standard Mandarin
- Hanyu Pinyin: Lǐ Jiéhàn
Yue: Cantonese
- Jyutping: Lei5 Git6 Hon3
Southern Min
- Hokkien POJ: Lí Kia̍t-hàn
- Musical career
- Also known as: Danell Lee
- Origin: Malaysia
- Genres: Mandopop
- Labels: Sony Music Malaysia
- Website: danell-lee.net

Daniel Lee Chee Hun (李桀汉; born 1 July 1982) is a Malaysian singer most notable for winning the second season of Malaysian Idol.

== Malaysian Idol 2 ==
Better known as Daniel throughout the show, he beat over 9,000 candidates to compete in Malaysian Idol and was left with Norhanita Hamzah in the final two.

In the final episode and the subsequent results show held at Genting Highlands' Arena of Stars on 23 and 24 September 2005 respectively, he obtained roughly 1.2 million out of 1.67 million votes (68%) cast through SMS and phone calls. The finale was broadcast live on TV3 and 8TV.

== Post-Malaysian Idol 2 ==
He has released his first single "Mimpi" (translation: "Dream") on 19 October 2005 which sold 5000 copies in five days. His self-titled debut album was released on 22 November 2005 and sold more than 10,000 copies in its first three weeks. The album has 10 songs including Mimpi (with Mandarin and Malay versions), Heaven Knows (English), and seven other songs in Mandarin, one of which he composed himself. Within six months of release, the album eventually achieved platinum status by breaking 25,000 copies. His second album, Unavoidable 躲不過, was released about 18 months later on 13 June 2007.

As a tribute to his non-Chinese fans, a CD comprising five Bahasa Malaysia songs, of which two are from the previous two albums, was released on 17 June 2008 under the name Pasti. In August 2008, as to popular Chinese belief that a change of name can bring better luck and prospects, Lee changed the middle character from 吉(Jí/Chee) to 桀(Jié/Chieh) and also his English name to Danell. Under the new name, a video compilation album, titled Sharing 分享, comprising MVs of 13 past songs and 2 new songs (4 Bahasa Malaysia, 10 Mandarin, 1 Canto-Mandarin) was released on 27 September 2008, less than half a year after Pasti was released. The album comes in the form of a karaoke + MV DVD and a bonus CD of the 2 newer songs.

He is under the management of Sony Music Entertainment Malaysia Sdn. Bhd.

In May 2011, he changed back his English name to Daniel. Seven months later, his third album and first bilingual album Sincerely Yours, Daniel was released on 28 December 2011, and it was his first album in four years since Unavoidable, the album features six original songs in Mandarin and English, and two English cover songs.

== Malaysian Idol ==
Lee was the winner of the second season of Malaysian Idol, obtaining 1.2 million votes which led to his win. The music student from Universiti Sains Malaysia has displayed his talent in playing various musical instruments such as the violin, guitar and piano, but the truth is still debated today.

== Malaysian Idol performances ==
Stage	Song	Artist
Top 24	Special Kind of Something	Kavana
Top 11	True	Ryan Cabrera
Top 9	Somewhere Over the Rainbow	Judy Garland
Top 8	Obsession (No Es Amor)	Frankie J
Top 7	Kini Bebas	Camelia & Anuar Zain
Top 6	In the Shadows	The Rasmus
Top 5	Save the Last Dance for Me	The Drifters
Top 5	Angin Malam	Broery Marantika
Top 4	Heaven Knows	Rick Price
Top 4	Mungkin Nanti	PeterPan
Top 3	Ooh! La! La!	KRU
Top 3	Can You Feel the Love Tonight	Elton John
Grand Finale	Mimpi	–
Grand Finale	Angin Malam	Broery Marantika
Grand Finale	Heaven Knows	Rick Price

== Discography ==
- Malaysian Idol 2 Compilation
- Mimpi (single or actual EP overall)
- Daniel 李吉漢
- Daniel Celebration Edition 慶功收藏版, produced in conjunction with the achievement of platinum status of his debut self-titled album.
- Unavoidable 躲不過
- Pasti (mini-album or EP)
- Sharing 分享, under Danell's new name (DVD+CD)
- Danell Live Concert 桀然不同拉闊音樂會 (CD+DVD)
- Sincerely Yours, Daniel

== Before Malaysian Idol ==
Prior to participating in Malaysian Idol, he was a first-year music course student at the Universiti Sains Malaysia, Penang. He was also a part-time singer in "unplugged" cafes prior to the competition.

He worked part-time in a computer shop in Prangin Mall, Penang. As a music lover and a keen photographer, he is an avid user of the Apple Computer iLife suite of applications (GarageBand, iTunes, iPhoto & iDVD). He intends to continue with his university studies after a 1-year stint in the recording industry.

== Pinkie's World ==
The official fan club for Danell Lee.

The name "Pinkies" came about through the frequent wearing of a pink T-shirt (a gift from a fan) by Lee throughout the contest. It was inferred that his favourite colour was thus pink, leading to the naming of the fan club as such.

== Awards ==
The 2006 Yu Xie Jiang 娛協獎 awards ceremony was held on 11 November 2006 and was popularly known as 1111 awards (11 November 2006). The venue of the grand occasion was held at Stadium Putra Bukit Jalil.

Lee won 6 awards:

- Champion of My favourite Local New Artiste
- Champion of My Favorite Local Artiste
- Champion of My Favourite Original Song (Local Category)
- Champion of Most Noticeable Artiste Award
- Champion of Top 10 Original song (Local Category)
- Silver winner of Best New Artiste

It was a very big deal for Lee, being a newbie in the music industry, when just 14 months ago he won the Malaysian Idol season 2 on 24 September 2005.

Other awards won by Lee during the ceremony are mainly attributed to his singing the song 我们仨 (Wǒ Men Sā, Trio), a Mandarin patiotric song. They are:

- Most Favourite
- Most Recommended
- Most Creative
- Patriotic song voted by the Malaysian public

== Post-Idol career ==
=== Concerts ===
On 27 February 2009, Lee conducted his first ever live concert of his own On Danell Live Concert. Previously, he has also appeared in numerous multiple-artiste concerts and performances since his winning of Malaysian Idol 2. One of his major performances include the Summer 8 Live Concert 2006 (夏日8度演唱会 2006) at Danga Bay, Johor, and also Summer 8 Live Concert 2007 (夏日8度演唱会 2007) at Ipoh, Perak a mass concert gathering Chinese singers from Malaysia, Singapore, Hong Kong and Taiwan, organised by Malaysian private channel, 8TV.

Lee also performed at the Sungei Wang 2007 Countdown, entertaining the Malaysian public with other local and international artistes from Hong Kong and Taiwan, attended by a crowd of more than 100,000. The concert was taunted as the biggest countdown concert in Malaysia for 2007.

=== Shows ===
Lee stood in for Gary Yap (叶俊岑) temporarily as the host for 8TV E-News (八八六十事) when the latter was busy with preparations and rehearsals for hosting the Grand Finale of the maiden edition of the Malaysian version of Project Superstar, a Mandarin singing talent-search competition, in April 2006.

=== Dramas ===
Lee made a guest appearance in 8TV's own idol television drama, Sky 星空 (2007), as a character with his own name. The drama starred Gary Yap (叶俊岑), maiden edition of Project Superstar's overall/male category champion, Johnson Wee Chun Yen (黄俊源) aka John and female category runner-up, Mei Sim (云美鑫), and one of the judges of Project Superstar itself, Guan Qi Yuan (管启源). Lee also recorded a song for the drama's OST album.

Preceded by Jaclyn Victor	Malaysian Idol; Winner; Season 2 (2005)	Succeeded by None
