= Nicestupidplayground =

Malaysian indie rock band

- Also known as: NSP, Nice Stupid Playground
- Origin: Sarawak, Borneo, Malaysia
- Genre: Indie rock
- Years active: 1992 - 2023
- Label: Positive Tone
- Members: Charles Rossem; John Boniface; Abdul Aziz Sahal; Charles Arthur; Dannie Jopie; Adrian Alphonsus
- Past members: Bendy Ismardy; Winelfie Alwi; Ricky Anthony; Abdul Hadi

Nicestupidplayground is a Malaysian indie rock band from Borneo that formed in 1992. The band has released many songs for popular compilations under several labels, namely Positive Tone, but have also managed to self-release a full-length albums in 2006, as well as one under Positive Tone in 2000. They achieved their highest success from the song "Bedroom Window", from the compilation Boys & Girls 1+1=3 which has received numerous awards, as well as inclusion in the soundtrack to the movie Chinese Box.

== History ==
Frontman and lead singer Charles Rossem started Nicestupidplayground in 1992; and modeled the sound after a distant early 1980s British rock sound, citing his initial influences as the Cure, the Smiths and The Stone Roses. After several contributions to compilations, they managed to sign under Positive Tone in 1996 and their hit song Bedroom Window landed on the album Boys & Girls 1+1=3 which featured their song as the first and main single; the compilation won several awards. Bedroom Window was chosen in Hong Kong by Hollywood movie producer Wayne Wang to be used in the movie Chinese Box starring Jeremy Irons. Their first full-length album called 'My Life Is My Parents' Biggest Television' was relelesed under Positive Tone in 2000. 'Stereogirl' was the first single from that particular album. After being let go from Positive Tone Records in 2003, Nicestupidplayground continued to tour minimally, offered meetings with fans upon the album release of A Beautiful Life.

== Awards ==
- Best Music Video (on show Video Muzik): Bedroom Window (5 other nominations in 1997 for Video Music Awards)
- Double Platinum: Boys & Girls 1+1=3
- Best English Album (Anugerah Industri Muzik; 1997): Boys & Girls 1+1=3

== Members ==
- Charles Rossem - vocals
- John Boniface - bass
- Abdul Aziz Sahal - guitar
- Danny Jopie - drums
- Charles Arthur - Keyboards
- Adrian Alphonsus - guitar

== Discography ==
=== Studio albums ===
- My life is my parents' biggest Television (2000)
1. Stereo Girl (4:02)
2. Girlfriday (3:00)
3. What If Its Rain (4:40)
4. Ballistic (3:35)
5. Adult Life (1:50)
6. Two (4:15)
7. Nineteen (4:20)
8. Discouraged (3:55)
9. Favourite (3:41)
10. Thank You (3:00)
- A Beautiful Life (2006)
1. Beautiful Life
2. Miracle
3. Happy
4. Chasing Butterfly
5. Telecommusication
6. If All Else Fails
7. Stronger than Before
8. Closer
9. My Teenage View
10. Because We Are

=== EP ===
- My life is my parents' biggest TV (1994)
- Girlfriday (1995)

=== Compilations ===
- Of course we didn't (1993) contributions:
1. Something like that
2. Makes Everything
3. Cut runs deep
- Thirtyzeroeight (1995) contributions:
1. I wanna be a millionaire
2. She Wants
3. Bedroom Window
4. ...and I don't admire the things you do
- 'Boys & Girls 1+1=3' (1997) contributions:
1. She Wants
2. Bedroom Window
3. ...and I don't admire the things you do
