= Jaclyn Victor =

Malaysian singer (born 1978)

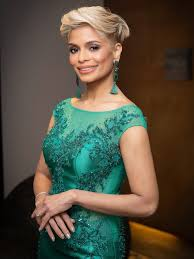
- Victor in January 2026
- Born: Jaclyn Joshua Thanaraj Victor; 4 December 1978 (age 47); Kuala Lumpur, Malaysia
- Other name: Jaclyn Victor Samuel
- Occupations: Singer, television personality, businesswoman, actress
- Years active: 2004–present
- Spouse: Calvin T. Samuel (m. 2025) Shawn Rivera (m. 2007; div. 2019)
- Children: 2
- Musical career
- Genres: Pop, Pop rock, R&B
- Instrument: Vocals
- Labels: Sony Music Malaysia; KRU Music; Rag Doll Records

Jaclyn Joshua Thanaraj Victor (born 4 December 1978) is a Malaysian singer, actress and businesswoman who won the inaugural Malaysian Idol, Ikon Malaysia, Gegar Vaganza Season 9, Gegar Vaganza All Stars & Singer 2026 Malaysia. As the winner of Malaysian Idol, she won a recording contract with Sony BMG Music Entertainment. She represented Malaysia in the first Asian Idol and Ikon Asean. She has been dubbed "Asia's Divette" for her vocal prowess and a legend in Malaysia.

Jaclyn Victor is known for her Malay-language hits such as Gemilang, Di Pohon Asmara, Wajah, Cepat - Cepat, Ceritara Cinta, Satu Harapan, Cinta Tiada Akhirnya, Bertamu Di Kalbu, Beribu Sesalan, Sebelah Jiwaku, Ikut Rentakku, Nisan Cinta, Perempuan and Sesal Tak Bermakna.

Her debut album "Gemilang" under the label Sony BMG won "Best Pop Album" and "Album of the Year" awards in Anugerah Industri Muzik 2005, while the title track won main prize at Anugerah Juara Lagu in 2005.

In 2012, Jaclyn Victor signed a recording deal with KRU Music and released an album titled "Ikut Rentakku". After winning several more awards, she then released her first major english language project, an EP titled "Unleashed" in 2014.

Jaclyn performed at the 2017 SEA Games after giving birth to her second child & it's her second time performing at the SEA Games after the 2011 ceremony. She also performed as a finalist for the 6th time at the Anugerah Juara Lagu 2019.

Jaclyn Victor joined the season 9 of Gegar Vaganza and she was declared as the champion in November 2022. Jaclyn released a new single in 2023 titled "Kembalilah" under her own label, Rag Doll Records. In December 2023, she won in Gegar Vaganza All Stars, winning back to back at two seasons of Gegar Vaganza.

Jaclyn released her long awaited 7th studio album titled "Glorius" in January 2025, her first album under her own label & her first LP since 2013. The album release is also a celebration of her being in the music industry for 20 years. In June 2026, Jaclyn Victor joined the chinese singing competition Singer 2026 Malaysia & declared as a champion.

As of 2025, Jaclyn Victor has won 10 Anugerah Industry Muzik (Malaysia's equivalent of the Grammy awards), 5 awards in various categories at Anugerah Juara Lagu, 2 Anugerah Bintang Popular, 2 Anugerah Planet Muzik & an Anugerah Skrin thus making her one of the most acclaimed and successful artists in Malaysia.

== Biography and music career ==
=== Early life ===
Jaclyn was born in Kepong, Kuala Lumpur, on 4 December 1978. She is the only daughter of Maggie, a single mother of 4 children . Jaclyn's father died when she was nine years old, prompting her mother to take on three jobs simultaneously to support her and her three younger brothers. At the age of eighteen, Jaclyn started singing in clubs and hotel lounges.

With the support of friends and family, Jaclyn and her friend Ravi, recorded an album, titled "Dream". This album was produced and written by Ravi Sivalingam and co written by Jaclyn. There were attempts to promote this album including an appearance on the 8TV television show Latte @ 8.

=== Malaysian Idol ===
In 2004, her mother encouraged her to audition for Malaysian Idol, which she did along with ten thousand others. The judges Roslan Aziz, Fauziah Latiff and Paul Moss, put her through to the next round. Having secured a final thirty-third spot, Jaclyn performed "Superwoman" live, becoming the seventh person to reach the top twelve.

In the first spectacular show, the theme for the week was "Song from your Pop Idol". Jaclyn choose a song by the Indonesian diva Ruth Sahanaya, "Keliru". Coached by Aubrey Suwito, Juwita Suwito along with Elaine Pedley, her performance took her through to the next round. The second theme was "Song from your Classic Idol". Jaclyn's choice was "When I Fall in Love" and Michael Xavier Voon joined in as performance coach. Her performance gained resounding praise. After another double elimination sending off Fahmy and Rydee, Jaclyn was back the following week performing a "Song from the 80s", Chaka Khan's "I Feel For You". She went on to the "Rock Show" with a performance of "Sweet Child O' Mine".

The last six contestants included Nikki, Dina, Vick, Andrew and Saipul. Jaclyn performed an effortless "Lady Marmalade", but received a less favourable comment from Roslan, who said that "she is a super singer but not an idol", and he felt bored week by week of her performances thus far. On the results show, she found herself in the bottom two for the first time (with Nikki, who performed "Emotion"), but she survived the elimination. After reaching the last three, her chances were improved by her performance of Alicia Keys' "If I Ain't Got You".

Jaclyn had become one of the final two contestants on Malaysian Idol, and on 9 October 2004, she took the title with 76% of audience votes over Dina. In tears, Jaclyn performed the ballad "Gemilang" (Glory), the song written for the winner of Malaysian Idol, which subsequently appeared on her first album Gemilang. The song's music video incorporated short scenes of Jaclyn in Malaysian Idol.

=== Post-Idol career ===
Jaclyn's album achieved gold status within weeks of going on sale. Her previously released album Dream sold out within days, despite the sudden increase in price. She won the "Best Newcomer Award" on Hitz. FM and "Best New Artist" in Anugerah Bintang Popular.

Jaclyn has since appeared in numerous television and talk shows such as Pillow Talk and Muzik-Muzik. She has also performed "Gemilang" at a tsunami concert held to aid victims of the 2004 Indian Ocean earthquake. She has performed in duets with Hazami, Taufik Batisah, Akademi Fantasia's winner Zahid, Delon Thamrin and Misha Omar. She has performed and recorded with international singers such as Peabo Bryson, Ramin Karimloo, Simon Bailey and Az Yet.

Jaclyn received her first international award when she won gold at the Asia New Singer Competition at the Shanghai Music Festival in China on 28 October 2005, emerging as the champion with her winning song "Gemilang". On 21 January 2006, she received RTM Hits 1 Best Song and Best Performance awards for "Gemilang". On 5 February the same year, the song earned her and its composer Aubrey Suwito and lyricist Azmin Mudin the "Juara Lagu" (Champion of Songs) and "Best Ballad Song" awards in TV3's 20th edition of the Anugerah Juara Lagu. She was expected to win the TV3's "Anugerah Vokal Terbaik" (Best Vocal Award) but was beaten by Hazami who performed "Kata". Jaclyn took the Best Female Artiste award at the Anugerah Planet Muzik (Music Planet Awards) in Singapore on 24 March.

On 29 April 2006, Victor won four of seven nominations from the Malaysian music scene's biggest night, the 13th Anugerah Industri Muzik. They were Best New Artist, Best Musical Arrangement in a Song, Best Pop Album and Best Album.

After a series of delays, Jaclyn's second album, Inilah Jac, was released on 25 August 2006, while she was on a trip to Australia for both leisure and business purposes, including visiting Mount Buller and performing in two concerts in Melbourne's Australia for Christ Fellowship Church (with the singer-songwriter Juwita Suwito), and in Adelaide's Paradise Community Church (of which the inaugural Australian Idol winner, the Malaysian-born Guy Sebastian is a member, though Sebastian himself did not appear). While in Australia, Jaclyn also did an interview for the Christian radio station HCJB.

In November 2006, she made her first proper music video (previously her videos were clips from studio recording sessions or footage from Malaysian Idol) when she filmed "Ceritera Cinta" with the male crooner Rio Febrian in his homeland in Indonesia.

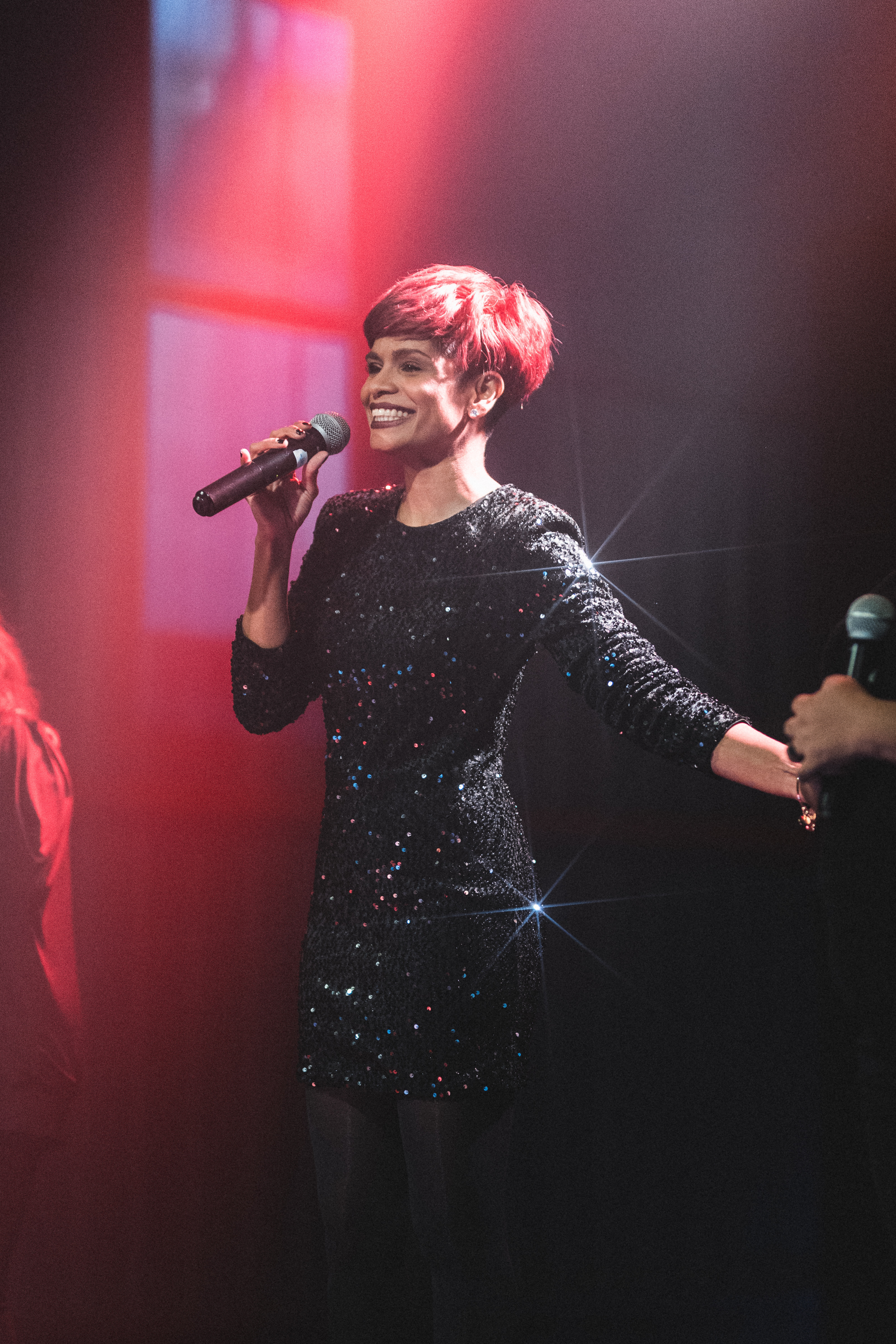
Victor performing Dec 2018

2007 was a very busy year for Jaclyn. She competed in the Ikon Malaysia 2007 (solo category) competition, getting to the final round with Dayang Nurfaizah and Mawi. In the final, she sang a medley of songs: "Impian" (hope) from her first album, "Cepat-cepat" from her second album and "Gemilang", to win the title.

Later that year, she competed in Ikon Asean and was defeated by the Philippines' Vina Morales. She also participated in the first Asian Idol which was won by Hady Mirza of Singapore Idol.

At the 14th Anugerah Industri Muzik (AIM) Malaysia, on 28 April 2007, Jaclyn was nominated for four awards – Best Vocal Performance in an Album – Female; Best Music Arrangement in a song – Inilah Masanya; Best Pop Album – Inilah Jac; Ceritera Cinta – Song of the year. She won the "Best Female Vocal Performance in an Album" award. She also received two APM nominations, all of which are attributed to Inilah Jac.

Jaclyn's music was used on the Special Edition of Disney studio's High School Musical 2 soundtrack. She sang the duet "You Are The Music in Me" in both English and Bahasa Malaysia with Vince Chong, the season 1 winner of another singing reality-TV program, Akademi Fantasia. A music video and nationwide mall tour followed for fans of the High School Musical franchise. The video of their version of the song is now on the Special Edition DVD of High School Musical 2 (2008).

As part of the year-long "50 Years of Malaysian Independence" celebrations, Jaclyn was part of the "Live and Loud KL" concert series which featured international and local artists. This 10-day music extravaganza included a wide range of genres and more than fifty performers, with more than 45 hours of live music. The festival was held from 23 November until 2 December, with each day giving festival-goers a different genre, a different theme, a different repertoire, a different venue and different stars, including Whitney Houston, Elliott Yamin, Shaggy, Project Pop, James Taylor Quartet, Joe Flizzow and Hannah Tan.

Before Christmas 2007, Jaclyn flew to Moscow for a charity Christmas concert named Christmas Bash 2007, co-organized by the Sechenov Malaysian Student Association and Malaysian Fellowship Moscow after an invitation by the organising committee. The concert was attended by almost a thousand people, the majority of them being Malaysian Medical Students studying in Moscow. She also performed during the 8TV's fourth birthday party in January 2008.

On 27 January 2008, the finals of the annual Anugerah Juara Lagu were held in Kuala Lumpur. After a difficult competition, Jaclyn won the Best Vocal Award with Lah from VE for their rendition of Jaclyn's duet "Ceritera Cinta" (originally with the Indonesian singer, Rio Febrian). The song is on Victor's second Sony BMG album, Inilah Jac.

Two of her songs have been used as opening themes for Malaysian television series, "Cepat-Cepat" for sitcom Fara and "Satu Harapan" for the TV drama Manjalara.

In 2009, Jaclyn Victor released her third official album entitled "Jaclyn Victor III".

=== 2010–2019 ===
In 2011, she released a collaborative album with Ning Baizura and Shila Amzah entitled "3 Suara", they won "Best Vocal in a Song" at the 18th Anugerah Industri Muzik and "Most Popular Group" in "Anugerah Bintang Popular 2011".

In 2012, Jaclyn Victor won three Anugerah Industri Muzik awards for the song "Counting days" with Aubrey Suwito. She also joined another singing competition hosted by Astro called Mania in 2012 battling several other Malaysian singers and as emerged as a top 3 finalist.

A song titled "Harapan Bangsa" sung by Jaclyn in 2007 for the churches in Sabah and Sarawak caused controversy in certain sections of the Muslim community, which is predominantly Malay-speaking people in Peninsular Malaysia, when a YouTube clip of the song using Christian images was uploaded five years later by a fan. Perkasa, the infamous non-governmental Malay organisation which was formed in the aftermath of the Malaysian general elections in 2008, has called for a blanket boycott of Jaclyn by Muslims nationwide over the song.

Jaclyn wanted a change in her musical direction and in 2012, she signed a recording agreement with "KRU Music", a progressive independent label. Through this label, Jaclyn Victor released 3 successful singles namely "Sebelah Jiwaku", "Jagalah Diri" and "Ikut Rentakku", produced and written by Malaysia's prolific singer-songwriter-producer Edry Abdul Halim. In early of 2014, once again Jaclyn Victor won for The Best Vocal in Anugerah Juara Lagu 28 through her song, Ikut Rentakku beating other performers including Azlan and The Typewriter and Hafiz Suip. She recorded a rock track "Shine" with Beat The System and won VIMA Song of the Year.

In July 2014, Victor continued her contract with KRU Music and released her English EP entitled "Unleashed" in September 2014. Jaclyn promoted the album in Los Angeles in a one-week tour, performing live shows and attending TV and radio interviews. She performed in Istana Budaya for a James Bond musical tribute entitled The Licence To Thrill: A Bond Concert in September 2014. The concert features West End stars David Shannon and Simon Bailey and local singers, Salamiah Hassan and Nikki Palikat.

In 2015, Jaclyn Victor released the Malay version of her song "Sweeter than a dream" entitled "Seindah Mimpi" as a single. In early 2016, she performed as a guest artist in Stadium Negara alongside Siti Nurhaliza for her concert, Dato' Siti Nurhaliza & Friends Concert, as a celebration of the latter 20th anniversary in music industry.

In early 2017, Jaclyn performed at the Anugerah Juara Lagu as an Opening Act. In summer 2017, she released a collaborative song with Siti Nordiana titled "Nisan Cinta" and another collaborative song with Hafiz Quip titled "Aku Negaraku" as a Merdeka song. Victor performed at the 2017 SEA Games after two days of giving birth to her second child.

In early 2018, Jaclyn Victor received an Anugerah Ikon Muzik (Music Icon award). In August 2018, she appeared as a guest judge and also performed at the Big Stage 2018 organized by Astro. Jaclyn performed the iconic Bohemian Rhapsody song with finalist Pasya at the Grand Finale of Mentor 7 in December 2018.

In early 2019, Jaclyn Victor competed as a finalist for the 6th time at Anugerah Juara Lagu through the song Nisan Cinta with Siti Nordiana. She also did an opening performance at the 30th Festival Filem Malaysia. In April 2019, Jaclyn released a collaborative song titled "Keep Flying" with Sasi The don, Caprice and Alvin Chong for Malaysian Airlines.

=== 2020–present ===
In early 2021, Jaclyn released a collaboration song with Faizal Tahir, Tuju K-Clique and Siti Nordiana titled " #BaikSemula " for Covid-19 pandemic and made a special performance at Anugerah Juara Lagu. In August 2022, Jaclyn Victor released a new official single since 2015 titled "Perempuan". She also joined the season 9 of Gegar Vaganza and won the competition in November 2022.

Jaclyn released another single in 2023 titled "Kembalilah" & it's her first under her own label, Rag Doll Records. Jaclyn Victor won "The Most Celebrated Singer" award at The Knights Award 2023. She also joined Gegar Vaganza All Star (GV Season 10) which is a reality music show that had 10 seasons and for the 10th, the participants are the winners or top 3 from the previous 9 seasons. It has a duration of total 12 weeks, Jaclyn joined the show as the winner of Gegar Vaganza Season 9.

As of 11 December 2023, Jaclyn Victor was announced as the winner for Gegar Vaganza All Stars. This is Jaclyn's back to back wins at two seasons of Gegar Vaganza. In 2024, she continues releasing new singles under her own label which is "Kejutkan Aku" and "Sesal Tak Bermakna". Jaclyn did her first official solo concert in October 2024 at Kuala Lumpur celebrating 20 years of her career in the music industry since winning the Malaysian Idol. She also released an official english language song titled "B.D.T.", it is her first english single since "Remedy" which was released 10 years ago in 2014. At the end of 2024, Jaclyn Victor won the Lifestyle Asia 100 "Icon of the year" award.

In January 2025, Jaclyn Victor released her long awaited 7th studio album titled "Glorius" which is her first album under her own label "Rag Doll Records" & her first LP since 2013. The album release also is a celebration of her 20 years in the music industry. In May 2025, Jaclyn released the music video for "Racun" as the final single from the same album. In June 2026, she released a new single titled "Setulusnya" with Siti Nordiana, this marks their second collaboration together. Jaclyn Victor joined the first Malaysian version of the chinese singing competition Singer titled Singer 2026 Malaysia & won the show in July 2026, this win extends her winning streak for 3 singing competitions this decade.

== Acting career ==
She starred in the film Talentime, directed by Yasmin Ahmad, in 2009. She received the award for Best Promising Actress at the 22nd Malaysian Film Festival. She was reportedly invited to star in a film by Mamat Khalid but declined. She made a cameo appearance in a local horror film, Susuk. Jaclyn also appeared in a local Tamil film, Appalam which is directed by Afdlin Shauki. She has also appeared in musical theatre, Cuci The Musical Season 2 in 2010.

== Personal life ==
On 25 May 2025, Jaclyn Married Calvin T Samuel, a British Methodist Minister and Executive Coach. The couple celebrated their wedding at Grand Hyatt KL surrounded by friends and family from across the globe.

She was previously married to American singer, Shawn Rivera, which ended in divorce in 2019.

Jaclyn Victor has a son, born 24 August 2015, and a daughter was born 24 August 2017.

== Filmography ==
Films
Year	Film	Role	Notes
2008	Susuk	Herself	Cameo appearance as herself
2009	Talentime	Bhavani	Received the award for Best Promising Actress at the 22nd Malaysian Film Festival
2010	Appalam	Nalaini	Tamil remake of Malay film Papadom
2010	Cuci The Musical		A musical theatre (Season 2)
2026	Dear Amma		An Astro telefilm

== Discography ==
=== Studio albums ===
Year	Album	Label	Notes
2002	Dream	Independent	The album featured 10 english songs (all written and composed by Ravi Sivalingam) that had two hits 'In a dream' and 'Not Gonna Fall' both reached the No.1 Spot on Malaysian Hitz
2004	Gemilang	Sony BMG	More than 20,000 units sold (Double Platinum). The album won "Best Pop Album" and "Album of the Year" awards in Anugerah Industri Muzik 2005. The song "Gemilang" won the Anugerah Juara Lagu 2005.
2006	Inilah Jac	Sony BMG	She won "Best Female Vocal Performance in an Album" award at the Anugerah Industri Muzik 2006.
2007	Inilah Jac – Edisi Terhad	Sony BMG	Re-released with new tracks and music videos.
2009	Jaclyn Victor III	Sony Music	She was nominated for Best Vocal in Song (Female) at the 17th Anugerah Industri Muzik, 2010.
2011	3 Suara	Sony Music	Collaboration with Ning Baizura and Shila Amzah.
2013	Ikut Rentakku	KRU Music	Winner of Best Vocal Performance at Anugerah Juara Lagu 2014 for the title track.
2025	Glorious	Rag Doll Records	Her 7th studio album & her first album under her own label.

=== EPs ===
- Bersama Kamu (2013, KRU Music)
- Unleashed (2014, KRU Music) [English EP]

=== Compilations ===
- Malaysian Idol Karaoke (with Danell Lee) (2005, Karaoke CD/VCD, Sony BMG)
- Jubilee (compilation Christian album) (2007, AION Music)
- Keunggulan Jaclyn Victor (compilation of her well-known hits) (2011, 2CD/1VCD, Sony Music)
- Hits Terbaik - Misha Omar and Jaclyn Victor (2014, Sony Music)

=== Singles ===
[Year 2000 - 2009] :

- "In a Dream'" (2002, released independently)
- "Not Gonna Fall" (2002, released independently)
- "Gemilang" (2004)
- "Di Bawah Pohon Asmara" (2005)
- "Wajah" (2005, theme song for Bersamamu TV3)
- "Cinta" (a collaboration with Misha Omar) (2006)
- "Cepat Cepat" (2006)
- "Ceritera Cinta" (2006, duet with Rio Febrian)
- "Ipoh Mali" (a collaboration with Point Blanc) (2007)
- "Satu Harapan" (2007)
- "Cinta Tiada Akhirnya" (2007)
- "Kau Muzik di hatiku" (2007, duet with Vince Chong) (OST of High School Musical 2 – Asian edition)
- "You're the Music in Me" (2007, duet with Vince Chong) (OST of High School Musical 2 – Asian edition)
- "Dambaran Cinta" (2008, theme song for Apa Kata Hati)
- "Bertamu Di Kalbu" (2009)
- "Cinta Ada" (a collaboration with Dato' Sheila Majid and Karen Kong) (2009)
- "Inilah Malaysia" (2009, featuring Arch Little Danielle) (for the Lagu 1Malaysia Kita Song Competition)

[Year 2010 - 2019] :

- "Ku Tak Bisa" (2010)
- "Di Mana Di Mana" (a collaboration with Ning Baizura and Shila) (2011)
- "Beribu Sesalan" (a collaboration with Ning Baizura and Shila) (2011)
- "Semua Isi Hatimu" (a collaboration with Ning Baizura and Shila) (2011)
- "Counting days" (a collaboration with Aubrey Suwito) (2012)
- "Jagalah Diri" (first song under the KRU Studios label) (2012)
- "Sebelah Jiwaku" (2012)
- "Ikut Rentakku" (2013)
- "Faith" (a collaboration with Faizal Tahir) (2014)
- "Remedy" (2014)
- "Seindah Mimpi" (2015)
- "Nisan Cinta" (a collaboration with Siti Nordiana) (2017)
- "Aku Negaraku" (a collaboration with Hafiz Suip) (2017)
- "Keep Flying" (2019, a collaboration with Sasi The Don, Caprice and Alvin Chong) (for Malaysian Airlines)
- "Aktif Negaraku" (2019, for Milo)

[Year 2020 - Present] :

- "Inilah Malaysia" (2020)
- " #BaikSemula " (2021, a collaboration with Faizal Tahir, Tuju K-Clique and Siti Nordiana) (for Covid-19)
- "Perempuan" (2022)
- "Sama Sama Kita" (2023, a collaboration with Siti Nurhaliza and Alvin Chong)
- "Kembalilah" (2023)
- "Kejutkan Aku" (2024)
- "Bersama Satu Suara (2024, a collaboration with Alif Satar and Priscilla Abby)
- "Sesal Tak Bermakna" (2024)
- "B.D.T." (2024)
- "Racun" (2025)
- "Setulusnya" (2026, a collaboration with Siti Nordiana)

=== Music videos ===
Year	Title	Notes
2004	"Gemilang"	Malaysian Idol crowning song
2005	"Wajah"	Theme song for TV3 charity show, Bersamamu
2006	"Cinta"	A cover sang with Misha Omar
2006	"Without You"	As a feature artist with Same Same
2006	"Cepat Cepat"	First single of the album Inilah Jac
2006	"Ceritera Cinta"	Duet with Indonesian singer, Rio Febrian
2007	"Ipoh Mali"	As a feature artist alongside Point Blanc, a Malaysian rapper
2007	"Satu Harapan"	Opening theme song for TV drama, "Manjalara"
2007	"You're the Music in Me"	Duet with Vince Chong for High School Musical Asia Edition
2009	"Bertamu di Kalbu"	First single of Jaclyn Victor III
2011	"Beribu Sesalan"	Collaboration with Ning Baizura and Shila Amzah
2012	"Jagalah Diri"	Original Soundtrack for the film, 29 Februari. First song released under KRU Music
2014	"Ikut Rentakku"	Single from her EP with the same name
2014	"Faith"	Collaboration with Faizal Tahir
2014	"Remedy"	Single from her first English EP "Unleashed"
2015	"Sweeter Than A Dream"	
2015	"Seindah Mimpi"	Malay version of "Sweeter Than A Dream"
2017	"Aku Negaraku"	Collaboration with Hafiz Suip (Merdeka song)
2017	"Nisan Cinta"	Collaboration with Siti Nordiana
2019	"Keep Flying"	Collaboration with Sasi The Don, Caprice and Alvin Chong
2019	"With A Promise"	Wedding video with Shawn Rivera
2019	"Aktif Negaraku"	For Milo
2021	" #BaikSemula "	Collaboration with Faizal Tahir, Tuju K-Clique and Siti Nordiana
2022	"Perempuan"	First official single since 2015
2023	"Kembalilah"	First single under her own label, Rag Doll Records
2024	"Bersama Satu Suara"	Collaboration with Alif Satar and Priscilla Abby
2024	"Sesal Tak Bermakna"	
2025	"Glorious"	English version of "Gemilang" celebrating her 20 years in the music industry
2025	"Racun"	Final single from her latest album "Glorious"
2026	"Setulusnya"	Collaboration with Siti Nordiana

== Awards ==
Anugerah Industri Muzik:

- 13th Anugerah Industri Muzik (AIM) Malaysia – 2006
  - Best New Artist
  - Best Arrangement in a Song
  - Best Pop Album
  - Album of the Year
- 14th Anugerah Industri Muzik (AIM) Malaysia – 2007
  - Best Female Vocal Performance in an Album
- Anugerah Industri Muzik 18 – 2011
  - Best Vocal in a Song - Beribu Sesalan (with Ning Baizura and Shila Amzah)
- Anugerah Industri Muzik 19 – 2012
  - Best Vocal – Female. Song : "Counting Days"
  - Best Music Arrangement. Song : "Counting Days" (with Aubrey Suwito)
  - Best English Song. Song : "Counting Days" (with Aubrey Suwito)

Anugerah Juara Lagu:

- TV3 Anugerah Juara Lagu – 2006
  - Best Ballad Award – "Gemilang"
  - Song of the Year Award – "Gemilang"
- Anugerah Juara Lagu - 2008
  - Best Vocal Performance "Ceritera Cinta" (Duet with Lah, from VE)
- Anugerah Juara Lagu 26
  - 1st Runner-up – Beribu Sesalan (with Ning Baizura and Shila Amzah)
- Anugerah Juara Lagu 28
  - Best Vocal – Ikut Rentakku

Anugerah Bintang Popular:

- Anugerah Bintang Popular - 2005
  - Most Popular New Female Artist
- Anugerah Bintang Popular - 2011
  - Most Popular Group (with Ning Baizura and Shila Amzah)

Anugerah Planet Muzik:

- Anugerah Planet Muzik (Singapore) – 2006
  - Best Female Artist
- Anugerah Planet Muzik - 2011
  - Best Vocal Performance in a Group (Collaboration with Ning Baizura and Shila Amzah)

Other Accolades:

- Malaysian Idol - 2004
  - Title winner
- Hitz.FM Award - 2005
  - Best Newcomer
- Malaysia's Global Chinese Recommended Golden Arts Award (Music Category) – 2005
- XIII Shanghai Asian Music Festival Golden Prize – 2005
- RTM Hits 1 – 2006
  - Best Song Award – "Gemilang"
  - Best Performance Award
- URS Magazine Award
  - Non-Malay glamour artist
- Ikon Malaysia
  - Winner of Ikon Malaysia – Solo
- Anugerah Era - 2007
  - Chosen Local English Artiste
- Anugerah Skrin - 2009
  - Special Jury Award – Anugerah Yasmin Ahmad (Talentime)
- Shout! Awards - 2009
  - Power Vocal Award
- Festival Filem Malaysia ke-22
  - Most Promising Actress (Talentime)
- Anugerah Ikon Muzik (Music Icon Award) - 2018
- Woman Of Excellence Award - 2021/2022
  - Excellence Achievement Award In Entertainment Industry (Singer)
- Gegar Vaganza Season 9 - 2022
  - Winner/Champion
- The Knights Award - 2023
  - The Most Celebrated Singer
- Gegar Vaganza All Stars - 2023
  - Winner/Champion
- Lifestyle Asia 100 - 2024
  - Icon Of The Year
- Singer Malaysia - 2026
  - Winner/Champion

== Concerts ==
- Zoom in with Jaclyn Victor (2005)
- Konsert Fenomena Jaclyn Victor and Misha Omar (2005)
- Sunday Nite Live at Planet Hollywood (2006)
- Zoom in with Jaclyn Victor (2006)
- Konsert Fenomena Jaclyn Victor and Dayang Nurfaizah (2006)
- Down Memory Lane with Jaclyn Victor (2007)
- Malam Gemilang Ekslusif bersama Jaclyn Victor @ Planet Hollywood (2007)
- Hard Rock Cafe's Pinktober Live (Special Showcase) [2010]
- WEST END STARS in Concert (with Ramin Karimloo, Simon Bailey and Stephen Rahman Hughes)
- Konsert 3 Permata 2012 @ Esplanade Singapore (with Adibah Noor and Misha Omar)
- Swiss Dream Circus 2018 (with Ayda Jebat)
- PHM 2018 (Unity concert)
- Jaclyn Victor (First Solo Concert) 2024
- Jaclyn Victor: Live Intimate Showcase (2025)

Preceded by None	Malaysian Idol; Winner; Season 1 (2004)	Succeeded by Danell Lee
