= Sky (Malaysian TV series) =

- 星空
- Starring: Hoon Mei Sim, Johnson Wee, Gary Yap, Candy Lim, Daniel Lee
- Country of origin: Malaysia
- Original language: Mandarin
- No. of episodes: 13

Production
- Running time: approx. 25 mins（per episode）

Original release
- Network: 8TV
- Release: 6 May – 29 July 2007

Sky (Chinese: 星空; pinyin: xīng kōng) was a Malaysian-made Mandarin drama series, produced by and aired on 8TV, which combined newly discovered celebrities, particularly from the station's reality programmes Malaysian Idol, Project Superstar Malaysia and I Wanna Be A Model, namely Hoon Mei Sim, Johnson Wee, Gary Yap, Candy Lim and Daniel Lee Chee Hun.

Sky began its run on 8TV on 6 May 2007 and ended its run after 13 weeks. The DVD release of the drama was released on 27 September 2008. Currently, there is no word of any plans to distribute the drama internationally.

Just after filming of a scene of the series in Ulu Langat had completed, two members of 8TV's crew were killed in a collision with a lorry. Leong Kak Sek, 26, was killed on the spot while Loke Ting Hong, 20 died on the way to Hospital Kajang. They were the only crew in the van that was being used to transport the production equipment and wardrobe when the accident occurred.

== Synopsis ==
Lin Xin Mei, the daughter of a rural inn owner, just loved singing. Her big break into the entertainment industry arrived when a well-known music producer, Adrian paid a visit to Xin Mei's hometown, in search of musical inspiration. By chance, Adrian discovered Xin Mei's nearly perfect voice and decided to train her as a singer, being the vocalist of his latest composed song. Xin Mei's pursuit toward her dreams led her to Kuala Lumpur, having to sacrifice life in her home town and her playmate and best friend, Huang Wei Ming.

Rich girl Yuki also had naturally-gifted talent whose achievements in numerous singing competitions since she was a child inspired her to be a superstar. Her father owns a recording company and Yuki is one of the singers with the company. However, Yuki's talent did not impress music producer Joey, who thought Yuki was just a singing machine.

Xin Mei could not adapt to the urban lifestyle during her early arrival in KL. Furthermore, Yuki's envision and many other incidents has led her to much sufferings. Xin Mei gets encouragement and mental support from Adrian, Wei Ming and Ivan, helping her to adapt to her new lifestyle.

== Ratings ==
According to reports, the first 7 episodes of Sky recorded an average of over 500,000 viewers per episode, leading into a probability that a sequel would be made.

== Sky OST ==
Released in mid-June, it consists of one MV, six songs and 3 scores.

=== Track list ===
1. 快乐的一天 A Happy Day (Music video) – Cast of Sky
2. 快乐的一天 A Happy Day – Cast of Sky
3. 太用力 Too Much Effort – Meisim
4. 无所谓 Never Mind – Meisim
5. 未来 The Future – Johnson Wee and Meisim
6. 不许哭 No Need to Cry – Meisim
7. 一天一点 A Little Bit Every Day – Candy Lim
8. 快乐的一天 A Happy Day (music only)
9. 未来 The Future (music only)
10. 不许哭 No Need to Cry (music only)

== See also ==
- Realiti (TV series)
- 8TV (Malaysia)
- Gol & Gincu The Series
