= Dina Nadzir =

Malaysian singer

- Born: Faradina binti Mohd. Nadzir; February 7, 1985 (age 41); Johor Bahru, Johor, Malaysia
- Other name: Dina
- Occupations: Singer, radio announcer, actress, television presenter, businesswoman
- Years active: 2004–present
- Musical career
- Labels: Universal Music; Nature Records

Faradina binti Mohd. Nadzir (born 7 February 1985), also known as Dina Nadzir or Dina, is a Malaysian singer, radio announcer, actress, television presenter, and businesswoman. She was the runner up for the first season of Malaysian Idol. After discovering her singing voice at the age of 16, she appeared on the series approximately three years later in 2004. She is the two-time winner of the "Annual World Championships of Performing Arts" competition in Los Angeles.

== Filmography ==
=== Film ===
Year	Title	Credited as	Role	Notes
2009	Jangan Pandang Belakang Congkak	Actor	Ziana	
2012	Sofazr The Movie – Jiwa Kacau	Actor		Cameo
2013	Hello	Actor		Cameo

=== Television ===
Year	Title	Role	TV channel	Notes
2007	Ikon Malaysia	Herself	Astro Ria	
2008	Rempit vs Impak Maksima	Asmida	TV3	
2009	3 Janda		Astro Prima	
2009	Anak Aku Artis	Mimi	Astro Ria	Telemovie
2009	Baju Raya Mona	Mona	Astro Ria	Telemovie
2012	Anugerah Industri Muzik ke-19	Herself	Astro Mustika HD	
2014	Anugerah Industri Muzik ke-21	Herself	Astro Ria	Voiceover
2017	MeleTOP	Herself	Astro Ria	
2019	Borak Kopitiam	Herself	TV3	
2021	Helo Doktor	Herself	TV3	
2021	Maharaja Lawak Mega 2021	Herself	Astro Warna	Host
2021	Suara Viral 2.0	Herself	Astro Prima	Invited jury
2022	Gegar Vaganza (season 9)	Herself	Astro Ria	

=== Theatre ===
Year	Title	Role
2008	Impak Maksima The Musical	Asmida
2009	Impak Maksima The Musical	Asmida
2011	Dreamgirls: The Broadway Musical Sensation	Effie White (with Elvira Arul)
2012	Cuci the Musical Last Kopek	Farah
2013	Supermokh Sebuah Muzikal	Nurin
2015	Impak Maksima The Musical Diari Wanita: Episod Kak Ani dan Nyonya	Kak Ani
2017	That's Entertainment! A Night at the Movies	
2018	A Night with the Stars	Herself
2018	That's Entertainment! A Night of Radio Hits	
2018	Company	

== Discography ==
=== Studio album ===
- Cinta Datang Lagi (2005)

=== Singles ===
- "Cinta Datang Lagi" (2005)
- "Malu Tapi Mahu" (2007)
- "Inspirasi Hidupku" (2009)
- "Laju Lampau (OST Rempit vs Impak Maksima)" (2009)
- "Indahnya (OST Pisau Cukur)" (2009)
- "Walt Disney's Hercules (Malay Version)" (2010)
- "Walt Disney's Mulan (Malay Version)" (2010)
- "Sejauh Ini" (2011)
- "Selamat Tinggal" – Zizan Razak & Dina (2011)
- "Kasih (OST Bini-Biniku Gangster)" (2011)
- "Senjakala (OST Senjakala)" (2011)
- "Wanita Besi" (2011)
- "Getting Away With Murder" – Pop Shuvit (feat. Dina Nadzir) (2011)
- "Aci Aci Buka Pintu" – Pop Shuvit (feat. Dina Nadzir) (2011)
- "Aku Ingin (OST Aku Terima Nikahnya)" (2012)
- "Dendam Pencinta" (2012)
- "Eratkan Jalinan (for Astro Raya Campaign)" (2012)
- "Planet Gempak (for Karnival Planet Gempak)" (2013)
- "Demi Kasih" (2013)
- "Hargai Cinta (OST Aku Pilih Kamu)" – Dina Nadzir (feat. Zwen Addeen) (2013)
- "Kaca dan Permata" – Akim & Dina Nadzir (2014)
- "Tarbiah Cinta (OST Tarbiah Cinta)" (2014)
- "Kosong Kosong (for Astro's Raya Campaign)" (2014)
- "Malaysia Kau Ku Cinta" (2014) – Adibah Noor (feat. Dina Nadzir)
- "Percaya" – Hazama, Dina Nadzir & Astro Radio All Stars (2014)
- "Mengapa Dia" (2014)
- "We Don't Talk Anymore (Malay Version)" – Charlie Puth (feat. Dina Nadzir) (2016)
- "Antara Sahabat Dan Cinta (OST Semusim Rindu)" (2017)

=== Jingles ===
- "TV3 Sing Off Tune" (2009)
- "Ribena Strawberry Advertisement" (2010)
- "Malaysia Year of Festivals 2015 (for Tourism Malaysia)" (2015)

== Awards and achievements ==
Year	Awards	Category	Recipient	Results	Note
2004	Malaysian Idol	First runner-up	Faradina Mohd. Nadzir	Won	
2005	World Championships of Performing Arts	R&B/Jazz/Funk/Blues	Dina Nadzir	Won	Gold medal
2005	World Championships of Performing Arts	Original Works	Dina Nadzir	Won	Silver medal
2006	Anugerah Industri Muzik ke-13	TOP 5 Best Vocal Performance in an Album	Dina Nadzir	Nominated	
2006	Anugerah Industri Muzik ke-13	TOP 5 Best New Artist	Dina Nadzir	Nominated	
2007	CLEO Young Achievers Award		Dina Nadzir	Won	
2007	Anugerah Belia Ikon by Ministry of Youth & Sports		Dina Nadzir	Won	
2008	Anugerah Hits 1 Season 5 by RTM	Best Performance	Dina Nadzir	Won	
2009	Anugerah Industri Muzik ke-16	TOP 5 Best Vocal Performance in a Song	Dina Nadzir	Won	
2013	Unsigned Only Music	R&B/Hip Hop	Dina Nadzir	Won	Honorable mention
2014	Anugerah Bintang Popular Berita Harian ke-27	TOP 5 Most Popular Radio Announcer	Dina Nadzir	Nominated	
2015	Anugerah Meletop Era	TOP 5 Best Radio Program	Dina Nadzir	Won	

=== Others ===
- Face of Estée Lauder's Earth Month Campaign (2012)
