= Paul Moss =

Malaysian businessman

Paul Raymond Moss is the general manager of Media Prima network's media portal and a judge in 8TV's One in a Million singing contest.

Moss was the AS A&R director of record company Positive Tone from its inception in 1994 until last year. Moss oversaw the transformation in Malaysian music that created whole new markets for English-language artistes and new genres of music.

== Background ==
Before settling in Malaysia, Moss, sometimes fondly addressed as Uncle Paul, was the song writer, guitarist and musical director for international pop band Aishah and The Fan Club.

The band originated in New Zealand and had five members: Paul Moss himself on guitars, Malcolm Smith on keyboards, Glenn Peters on Bass, Dave Larsen on drums and Aishah as their lead vocalist.

Aishah and The Fan Club were a big hit in 1990 when they released the album Sensation which had three Top 20 singles in New Zealand and Malaysian charts: "Sensation", "Paradise" and "Call Me".

Their next album, titled "Respect The Beat", also produced three Top 40 singles: "I Feel Love", "Never Gave Up On You" and "Don't Let Me Fall Alone". The album received a positive review in Billboard and the remix for "Don't Let Me Fall Alone" received heavy airplay on US Top 40 stations throughout the summer of 1990.

After the band split in 1993, Aishah continued with a solo career, and the rest of the members went back to New Zealand. Moss, however, returned and decided to settle down in Malaysia in 1995. He and Ahmad Izham Omar (who is today the CEO of 8TV, a Malaysian TV channel) formed their own music company called Positive Tone under the EMI label.

Paul Moss is responsible for artist signing, artistic direction, recording, production and content development at Positive Tone. Paul Moss is also a multi-award-winning music producer, songwriter and arranger. He has produced several gold and platinum releases and Anugerah Industri Muzik (AIM) winners from OAG, Innuendo and Juliet the Orange. He has also worked with other recording artists such as Too Phat, Ella and Nicestupidplayground.

== Malaysian Idol ==
Along with Roslan Aziz and Fauziah Latiff, Paul Moss was one of the judges in Malaysian Idol, a singing competition that is part of the Idol series that first started as Pop Idol. Moss expressed his opinions on Malaysian Idol harshly, often causing himself to be compared to Simon Cowell. He was a judge in the first Asian Idol held in Indonesia, representing Malaysian Idol.

== One in a Million ==
Paul Moss was a judge on the reality television series One in a Million alongside Syafinaz Selamat. Moss's job was similar to his previous role in Malaysian Idol.

== Media portals ==
Moss was appointed as Media Prima Network Media Portals Super General Manager.
