= Malaysian Idol =

Reality television series

- Genre: Reality
- Created by: Simon Fuller
- Based on: American Idol
- Presented by: Soo Kui Jien (1–2); Sharifah Aleeya (1); Cheryl Samad (2)
- Judges: Roslan Aziz (1–2); Fauziah Latiff (1–2); Paul Moss (1–2)
- Country of origin: Malaysia
- Original languages: Malay; English
- No. of seasons: 2
- No. of episodes: 18

Production
- Running time: 3 hours
- Production company: Fremantle Media

Original release
- Network: 8tv (Live broadcast); TV3 (Repeat broadcast)
- Release: 14 August 2004 – 24 September 2005

Malaysian Idol is the Malaysian version of the Idol franchise that started in UK, similar to shows such as UK's Pop Idol and American Idol in the franchise. This show is a contest to determine the best young singer in Malaysia, with the winner receiving a major record deal, although some runners-up have achieved enough fame to ink record deals of their own. Like any other Idol show, the winner is decided by public votes. The Malaysian Idol series has gained a following in Malaysia from people of all ages partly due to their interest in American Idol which had been introduced a few years prior. Malaysian Idol has been broadcast to Malaysian viewers via terrestrial television, 8TV and TV3.

The last few finalists of Malaysian Idol have become celebrities because they have their own following of fans who supported them throughout their appearance on Malaysian Idol.

Outside Malaysia, the show has become known worldwide for the audition of a Michael Jackson impersonator, which became a viral hit on the Internet because of his attempt to sing Billie Jean, gaining over 12 million views on YouTube.

== Overview ==
In Malaysian Idol, auditions were held for the top finalists. The first season was hosted by Soo Kui Jien and Sharifah Aleya. However, for the second season, Jien's new co-host was Cheryl Samad. Malaysian Idol was also unique in presenting in a bilingual English/Malaysian format, Jien representing a large portion of the English dialogue and the Malaysian part primarily Aleya/Samad which would have been of aid to Paul Moss' appearance on the show.

In a nutshell, the Malaysian Idol competition follows the Idol Series' main concept. All rounds of competition are broadcast on television. Contestants who aspire to be singers sign up and audition for the preliminary round in front of three judges (refer Judges below). Successful candidates enter the next round. In the next phase, Idol contestants perform individually and in a group. This round of elimination is also known as the "Theatre Elimination" Round (equivalent to American Idol's Hollywood Round) and their fate is again decided by the judges. The last phase involves weekly performances in front of an audience. The person with the fewest votes (as sent in by the audience throughout Malaysia through SMS and telephone calls) for each week, is eliminated. After each performance the judges will give their feedback; however, they do not determine whether the contestant should stay or go. This goes on until the Malaysian Idol has been selected.

== Judges ==
As seen in the format for American Idol where there were two American and one British judges, two of the judges in Malaysian Idol were native Malaysians, and the other a New Zealander. Similarly, two out of three of Malaysian Idol judges were male.

The judges included:

- Roslan Aziz — Malaysian musician, album producer, songwriter. singer
- Fauziah Latiff — Malaysian singer, actress
- Paul Moss — New Zealand singer, songwriter, producer, recording company Positive Tone's Artiste & Repertoire (A&R) director

== Malaysian Idol coaches ==
- Aubrey Suwito - Music Director
- Juwita Suwito - Vocal Coach
- Michael Xavier Voon & Petra Elaine Pedley- Performance Coaches

== Season 1 (2004) ==
Jaclyn Victor won the title as the first Malaysian Idol in 2004 while the runner-up was Faradina Mohd. Nadzir (Dina).

The Malaysian Idol winner's single is "Gemilang", written by Malaysian Idol music director Aubrey Suwito.

=== Finalists ===
(ages stated at time of contest)

Contestant	Age	Hometown	Voted Off	Liveshow Theme
Jaclyn Victor (Jac)	25	Kuala Lumpur	Winner	Grand Finale
Faradina Mohd. Nadzir (Dina)	19	Johor Bahru	9 October 2004	Grand Finale
Mavick Teo Hui Mau (Vick)	19	Ipoh	2 October 2004	Malaysian/International Hits
Andrew Tan Khin Huat (Andrew)	20	Kuala Lumpur	25 September 2004	Film Hits
Mohd Saipul B. Bakeri (Saiful)	18	Sarawak	18 September 2004	P. Ramlee Songs
Nicolette Palikat (Nikki)	18	Tambunan	11 September 2004	R&B
Ahmad Zamil Idris (Zamil)	26	Kampung Datuk Keramat	4 September 2004	Rock
Victor Lee Choon Keat (Victor)	22	Penang	28 August 2004	80s Hits
Rydiana Abdul Rahim (Rydee)	21	Kota Kinabalu	21 August 2004	Classic Hits
Mohammad Fahmy bin Zakaria (Fahmy)	19	Kuala Lumpur	21 August 2004	Classic Hits
Sufiah Mohamed Noor (Sufiah)	26	Kuala Lumpur	14 August 2004	My Idol
Fazdli Zainal (Fazly)	26	Kuala Lumpur	14 August 2004	My Idol

=== Elimination ===
Round:		Spectacular Show								
Week:		14/8	21/8	28/8	4/9	11/9	18/9	25/9	2/10	9/10
Place	Contestants	Result								
1	Jaclyn Victor					Btm2		Btm2		Winner
2	Faradina Mohd. Nadzir			Btm3						Runner Up
3	Mavick Teo Hui Mau								Elim	Eliminated (Week 8)
4	Andrew Tan				Btm3		Btm2	Elim	Eliminated (Week 7)	
5	Saipul Bakeri				Btm2	Btm3	Elim	Eliminated (Week 6)		
6	Nicolette Palikat		Btm3			Elim	Eliminated (Week 5)			
7	Ahmad Zamil Idris			Btm2	Elim	Eliminated (Week 4)				
8	Victor Lee Choon Keat			Elim	Eliminated (Week 3)					
9-10	Rydiana Rahim	Btm3	Elim	Eliminated (Week 2)						
9-10	Fahmy Zakaria		Elim	Eliminated (Week 2)						
11-12	Sufiah Mohamed Noor	Elim	Eliminated (Week 1)							
11-12	Fazdli Zainal	Elim	Eliminated (Week 1)							

== Season 2 (2005) ==
After the first selection round (auditions were open to the public throughout Malaysia), and the three Theater Elimination or "workshop" sessions were over, there were 11 finalists left. Every week of Malaysian Idol has resulted in with the contestant with the fewest votes going out of the contest.

=== Finalists ===
(ages stated at time of contest)

Contestant	Age	Hometown	Voted Off	Liveshow Theme
Daniel Lee Chee Hun (Daniel)	22	Changlun	Winner	Grand Finale
Norhanita Hamzah (Nita)	25	Kuala Lumpur	24 September 2005	Grand Finale
Farah Asyikin Zulkifli (Farah)	26	Taman Tun Dr Ismail	17 September 2005	Film Hits
Faizull Herman Mohd Yahya (Faizul)	24	Malacca	10 September 2005	Unplugged
Ashvin Nair (Ash)	25	Subang	3 September 2005	Classic Hits
Adam Alli @ Abu Kawi (Adam)	23	Sarawak	27 August 2005	Rock
Tengku Hamisah Zaharah (Xerra)	25	Kuala Lumpur	20 August 2005	Local Songwriters
Ejay Wong Shau Fui (Ejay)	25	Sabah	13 August 2005	R&B/Pop Hits
Azam Yakab @ Yakob (Azam)	21	Sabah	6 August 2005	Colours
Atilia Sarani (Atilia)	28	Kuala Lumpur	30 July 2005	Local/Foreign Hits
Tricia Priscilla D'Cruz (Tricia)	21	Cheras	30 July 2005	Local/Foreign Hits

These finalists released a compilation album entitled Malaysian Idol 2.

=== Elimination ===
Legend
Top 11	Winner

Safe	Top	Safe First	Safe Last	Eliminated

Round:		Spectacular Shows								Finale
Week:		30/7	6/8	13/8	20/8	27/8	3/9	10/9	17/9	24/9
Place	Contestants	Result								
1	Daniel Lee Chee Hun		1st	1st	1st		1st	1st		Winner
2	Norhanita Hamzah									Runner Up
3	Farah Asyikin Zulkifli								Elim	Eliminated (Week 8)
4	Faizull Herman Mohamad Yahya		Btm 3		Btm 3	Btm 2	Btm 2	Elim	Eliminated (Week 7)	
5	Ash Nair		Btm 2	Btm 3	Btm 2		Elim	Eliminated (Week 6)		
6	Adam Alli					Elim	Eliminated (Week 5)			
7	Tengku Hamisah Zaharah Tengku Zaimi			Btm 2	Elim	Eliminated (Week 4)				
8	Wong Shau Fui	Btm 3		Elim	Eliminated (Week 3)					
9	Azam Yakob		Elim	Eliminated (Week 2)						
10-11	Atilia Sarani	Elim	Eliminated (Week 1)							
10-11	Tricia Priscilla D'Cruz	Elim	Eliminated (Week 1)							

The winner of 2005 season of Malaysian Idol was Daniel Lee Chee Hun (Daniel) who defeated Norhanita Hamzah (Nita) (Note: Daniel has always been in the top position throughout the weeks leading to the finals, as mentioned occasionally in the show). According to the press conference, Daniel garnered a massive 1.2 million out of 1.67 million votes (or about 68%) by the audience to win the finals (the voting time window was approximately 24 hours after the final show). The final show was on September 23, 2005, and the results show was on September 24, 2005, and held in Genting Highlands's Arena of Stars. On the live broadcast aired on TV3 and 8TV, the three judges spoke highly of both the finalists.

The second season's theme (winner's) song is "Mimpi", written by Pot, a member of the Malaysian band Innuendo. It was also through this song that enabled Daniel to shine in the finals.

=== Cancellation ===
On 12 March 2006, 8TV's CEO announced that Malaysian Idol would not return for a third season. However, the show was succeeded by One in a Million (2006–2009), another reality singing competition that used a similar format.
