= List of awards and nominations received by Shila Amzah =

Shila Amzah awards and nominations
Awards and nominations
| Award | Wins | Nominations |
| Anugerah Bintang Popular | 2 | 8 |
| Anugerah Industri Muzik | 4 | 8 |
| Anugerah Juara Lagu | 3 | 5 |
| Anugerah Planet Muzik | 3 | 11 |
| Asian Wave | 1 | 1 |
| Shout! Awards | 1 | 2 |
| Nickelodeon Kids' Choice Awards | 0 | 1 |
| Bella Awards | 0 | 1 |
| The BrandLaureate Awards | 1 | 1 |

Totals (Note: Certain award groups do not simply award one winner. They acknowledge several different recipients, have runners-up, and have third place. Since this is a specific recognition and is different from losing an award, runner-up mentions are considered wins in this award tally. For simplification and to avoid errors, each award in this list has been presumed to have had a prior nomination.)
- Wins: 13
- Nominations: 35

Among the awards and nominations received by the Malaysian singer-songwriter Shila Amzah are: first runner-up of Bintang Kecil RTM in 2000, first runner-up of One in a Million (season 2), winner of Asia New Singer Competition in 2008, second runner-up of I Am a Singer (season 2) in 2014, and first runner-up of Anugerah Juara Lagu in 2011 and 2015. Shila is the first and only Malay artist to be invited to the Global Chinese Music Awards (GCMA).

== Malaysia ==
=== Anugerah Bintang Popular Berita Harian ===
Anugerah Bintang Popular (Malay: Popular Star Award), commonly known by the acronym ABPBH, originally named as Anugerah Pelakon/Penyanyi Popular, is an award presented annually by Berita Harian of Malaysia to recognize excellence of professionals in the entertainment industry, including the film industry, as well as record industry. The award ceremony features performances by prominent artists. It is the most prestigious people's choice award for Malaysian artists in the entertainment industry. The award was established in 1987 and it is totally based from the votes submitted by the readers of Berita Harian.

=== Anugerah Industri Muzik ===
Anugerah Industri Muzik (Malay: Music Industry Award), commonly known by the acronym AIM, is the Record Industry of Malaysia award ceremony.

It is Malaysia's equivalent of the Grammy Awards.

=== Anugerah Juara Lagu ===
Anugerah Juara Lagu (AJL, Malay for "Champion of Songs Awards") is a popular annual music competition in Malaysia, organized by TV3 since 1986. It features the best musical and lyrical compositions of each year it is held. Nominees are derived from a list of mostly-Malay songs which have garnered the most public votes in Muzik Muzik throughout the year, and then progress into the semi-finals, from which twelve songs – four songs from each of three categories (Pop/Rock, Balada, and Irama Malaysia – later known as Etnik Kreatif) will be nominated by a panel of judges to enter the Juara Lagu.

AJL honours the composers and lyricists of the songs rather than the performing artistes.

=== Shout! Awards ===
The Shout! Awards is an entertainment award show created to celebrate the Malaysian entertainment scene which is said has rapidly developed. The award recognizes people of music, television, film and radio industry as well as the entertainment industry as a whole.

There are 16 award categories including the biggest title – The Ultimate Shout! Award. The nominees are voted by the public online except for the Ultimate Shout! Award where it is decided by the judges.

=== Bella Awards ===
Malaysia’s 1st women awards show – Bella Awards 2013 – to celebrate, recognize, and honor successful women for their great achievement and inspirational contribution to the society.

The idea of the awards show derived from ntv7's award-winning women talk show – Bella – a show which inspires women every day with its powerful and informative topics.

Supported and endorsed by the Ministry of Women, Family and Community Development, the inaugural Bella Awards was debuted on 2 March 2013, in-conjunction with International Women's Day. The awards show will air LIVE at prime time 9 pm – 10.30 pm, while the Red Carpet will be shown at 8.30 pm, only on ntv7.

=== The BrandLaureate Awards ===
The BrandLaureate Awards is The Grammy Awards for Branding. This awards was founded by The Asia Pacific Brands Foundation (APBF), which is a non-profit organization dedicated to the promotion and improvement of branding standards in Malaysia and the Asia Pacific.

The BrandLaureate Awards is the ONLY Brand Award endorsed by His Royal Highness Duli Yang Maha Mulia Yang di-Pertuan Agong, Tuanku Mizan Zainal Abidin.

== Singapore and Indonesia ==
=== Anugerah Planet Muzik ===
Anugerah Planet Muzik is the award for artists who are engaged in the music world. This award includes singers from the allied countries, that is Malaysia, Singapore, and Indonesia.

The event was first held in 2001, and has been regularly held to date. Awards are given in various categories. There are awards aimed at covering all the countries that participate. And there are also awards intended for particular countries.

== China ==
=== Asian Wave ===
Asian Wave (simplified Chinese: 声动亚洲; traditional Chinese: 聲動亞洲; lit. 'Voices Moving Asia') is a Chinese reality singing talent show featuring contestants from many different Asian countries. The show premiered on 11 July 2012 on Dragon Television.

=== I Am A Singer 2 ===
I Am a Singer (Chinese: 我是歌手; pinyin: Wǒ Shì Gēshǒu) is a Chinese version of the reality show I Am a Singer and it is broadcast on Hunan Television.

== United States ==
=== Nickelodeon Kids' Choice Awards ===
The Nickelodeon Kids' Choice Awards, also known as the KCAs or Kids Choice Awards, is an annual awards show that airs on the Nickelodeon cable channel, which airs live and is usually held and telecast live (though with a three-hour time delay for those watching in the Pacific Time Zone or on the Nick 2 feed on digital cable that simulcasts the Pacific time zone feed) on a Saturday night in late March or early April, that honors the year's biggest television, movie, and music acts, as voted by Nickelodeon viewers.

But for Favourite Asian Act which Shila was nominated, only known as international distribution from Asia region.

== World ==
=== Global Chinese Music Awards ===
The Global Chinese Music Awards (GCMA) is a multi-national awards founded by seven Mandarin radio stations from Malaysia, Hong Kong, China, Singapore and Taiwan. In 2017, Shila Amzah became the only Malay singer for the award.

| Year | Award | Category | Recipient | Outcome |
|---|---|---|---|---|
| 2017 | 17th Global Chinese Music Awards | Outstanding Regional Artiste (Malaysia) | Shila Amzah | Won |

=== Forbes 30 Under 30 ===
Shila Amzah was listed in Forbes 30 Under 30 2018 along with a world most popular band BTS, Kris Wu, Pusarla V. Sindhu and many more artists and athletes in the Entertainment and Sports category.

== Accolades ==
| Year | Competition/Association | Category/Award | Nominated work | Result | Host country | |
|---|---|---|---|---|---|---|
| 2000 | Bintang Kecil RTM | 2nd place | "Ibu" | Won; First Runner-up | Malaysia | |
| 2000 | Anugerah Bintang Popular BH | Kid Artist of the Year | NurShahila | Won | Malaysia | |
| 2007 | One in a Million (season 2) | 2nd place | "Stuck"; "Oops!... I Did It Again"; "Memori Tercipta" | Won; First Runner-up | Malaysia | |
| 2008 | Asia New Singer Competition | Champion | Shila Amzah | Gold Award | Malaysia | |
| 2008 | Asia New Singer Competition | Best Song | "Memori Tercipta" | Won | Malaysia | |
| 2008 | Penang-Shanghai World Star Quest | Champion | Shila Amzah | Won | Malaysia China | |
| 2009 | 16th Malaysian Music Awards | Female Vocal Performance of the Year | "Memori Tercipta" | Nominated | Malaysia | |
| 2011 | Anugerah Planet Muzik | Duo/Group of the Year | 3 Suara | Won | Malaysia Singapore Indonesia | |
| 2011 | Anugerah Planet Muzik | Album of the Year | 3 Suara | Nominated | Malaysia Singapore Indonesia | |
| 2011 | 18th Malaysian Music Awards | Best Duo/Group Vocal Performance | 3 Suara | Won | Malaysia | |
| 2011 | 18th Malaysian Music Awards | Pop Song of the Year | "Beribu Sesalan" | Nominated | Malaysia | |
| 2011 | 18th Malaysian Music Awards | Album of the Year | 3 Suara | Nominated | Malaysia | |
| 2011 | Anugerah Bintang Popular BH | Duo/Group Artists of the Year | 3 Suara | Won | Malaysia | |
| 2011 | Anugerah Bintang Popular BH | Female Singer of the Year | Shila Amzah | Nominated | Malaysia | |
| 2011 | Anugerah Bintang Popular BH | Most Popular Female Artist Online | Shila Amzah | Nominated | Malaysia | |
| 2011 | 26th Anugerah Juara Lagu | 2nd place | "Beribu Sesalan" | Won; First Runner-up | Malaysia | |
| 2012 | 19th Malaysian Music Awards | Best Female Vocal Performance | "Patah Seribu" | Nominated | Malaysia | |
| 2012 | 19th Malaysian Music Awards | Song of the Year | "Patah Seribu" | Won | Malaysia | |
| 2012 | 19th Malaysian Music Awards | Pop Song of the Year | "Patah Seribu" | Won | Malaysia | |
| 2012 | Shout! Awards | Most Powerful Vocal Award | Shila Amzah | Won | Malaysia | |
| 2012 | Shout! Awards | Music Video of the Year | "Dejavu" | Nominated | Malaysia | |
| 2012 | Anugerah Planet Muzik | Best Female Artist | Shila Amzah | Won | Malaysia Singapore Indonesia | |
| 2012 | Anugerah Planet Muzik | Regional Artist of the Year | Shila Amzah | Nominated | Malaysia Singapore Indonesia | |
| 2012 | Anugerah Planet Muzik | Regional Song of the Year | "Beribu Sesalan" | Nominated | Malaysia Singapore Indonesia | |
| 2012 | Anugerah Planet Muzik | Social Media Icon | Shila Amzah | Nominated | Malaysia Singapore Indonesia | |
| 2012 | Stail EH! Awards | Friendliest Artist With Fans | Shila Amzah | Won | Malaysia | |
| 2012 | Asian Wave | Champion | "Gemilang"; "Grenade"; "征服 Conquer" | Won | China | |
| 2013 | Anugerah Bintang Popular BH | Female Singer of the Year | Won | Malaysia | | |
| 2013 | Anugerah Bintang Popular BH | Most Fashionable Artist | Nominated | Malaysia | | |
| 2013 | Anugerah Bintang Popular BH | Influential Artist in Social Media | Nominated | Malaysia | | |
| 2013 | Anugerah Bintang Popular BH | Asian Artist of the Year | Nominated | Malaysia | | |
| 2013 | Anugerah Bintang Popular BH | Best on Screen Chemistry | Shila Amzah & Sharnaaz Ahmad | Malaysia | Nominated | |
| 2013 | 27th Anugerah Juara Lagu | Finalist | "Patah Seribu" | Nominated | Malaysia | |
| 2013 | Nickelodeon Kids' Choice Awards | Favorite Asian Act | Shila Amzah | Nominated | (United States); US | |
| 2013 | Bella Awards | Bella On-Stage Award | Shila Amzah | Nominated | Malaysia | |
| 2013 | The BrandLaureate Awards | Country Branding Award | Shila Amzah | Won | Malaysia | |
| 2013 | Anugerah Planet Muzik | Female Artist of the Year | Shila Amzah | Nominated | Malaysia Singapore Indonesia | |
| 2013 | Anugerah Planet Muzik | Malaysian Song of the Year | "Masih Aku Cinta" | Won | Malaysia Singapore Indonesia | |
| 2013 | Anugerah Planet Muzik | Regional Song of the Year | "Patah Seribu" | Nominated | Malaysia Singapore Indonesia | |
| 2013 | Anugerah Planet Muzik | Regional Artist of the Year | Shila Amzah | Nominated | Malaysia Singapore Indonesia | |
| 2013 | Anugerah Planet Muzik | Social Media Icon | Shila Amzah | Nominated | Malaysia Singapore Indonesia | |
| 2013 | 20th Malaysian Music Awards | Kembara Award (International Breakthrough Award) | Shila Amzah | Special Award | Malaysia | |
| 2014 | I Am A Singer (season 2) | Third place | "When You Believe"; "MAMA" | Won; Second Runner-up | China | |
| 2014 | Anugerah MeleTop Era 2014 | Most Sensational in Fashion | Shila Amzah | Nominated | Malaysia | |
| 2014 | Era FM Malaysia | Best Artist of June 2014 | Shila Amzah | Won | Malaysia | |
| 2014 | Anugerah Planet Muzik | Female Artist of the Year | Shila Amzah | "Cinta Hati" | Nominated | Malaysia Singapore Indonesia |
| 2014 | Anugerah Planet Muzik | Artist of the Year | Shila Amzah | Shila Amzah | Nominated | Malaysia Singapore Indonesia |
| 2014 | Anugerah Planet Muzik | Social Media Icon | Shila Amzah | Shila Amzah | Nominated | Malaysia Singapore Indonesia |
| 2014 | Puteri UMNO Malaysia | Puteri UMNO Young Icon Award | Won | Shila Amzah | Malaysia | |
| 2014 | Ambassador of China to Malaysia | China-Malaysia Friendship Award | 茜拉 Shila Amzah | Won | China | |
| 2014 | 29th Anugerah Juara Lagu | 2nd place | "Masih Aku Cinta" | Won; First Runner-up | Malaysia | |
| 2014 | 21st Malaysian Music Awards | Female Vocal of the Year | "Cinta Hati" | Nominated | Malaysia | |
| 2014 | 21st Malaysian Music Awards | Album of the Year | Shila Amzah | Nominated | Malaysia | |
| 2014 | 21st Malaysian Music Awards | Engineered Album of the Year | Shila Amzah | Nominated | Malaysia | |
| 2014 | 21st Malaysian Music Awards | Pop Song of the Year | "Tulus" | Nominated | Malaysia | |
| 2014 | Anugerah Melodi Galaksi 2014 | Most Dynamic Artist | Shila Amzah | —N/a | Malaysia | |
| 2014 | Anugerah Melodi Galaksi 2014 | Choice Female Artist | Shila Amzah | —N/a | Malaysia | |
| 2014 | UCSI Scholar's Club (U-SchoS') | Malaysia's Top 10 Most Inspiring Young Leaders and Personalities Award | Shila Amzah | Won | Malaysia | |
| 2015 | Anugerah MeleTop Era 2015 | Most Sensational Singer | Shila Amzah | Nominated | Malaysia | |
| 2015 | Chinese Golden Melody Awards 2015 | Foreign Female Singer of the Year | 茜拉 Shila Amzah | Won | China | |
| 2015 | Anugerah Melodi Raya 2015 | Most Sensational Artist | Shila Amzah | Nominated | Malaysia | |
| 2015 | Hong Kong Guoyuli Awards 2015 | Female Singer of the Year | 茜拉 Shila Amzah | Won | Hong Kong | |
| 2015 | Hong Kong Guoyuli Awards 2015 | Excellence in Song Performance | 茜拉 Shila Amzah | Gold Award | Hong Kong | |
| 2015 | Anugerah Planet Muzik 2015 | Artist of the Year | Shila Amzah | Nominated | Malaysia Singapore Indonesia | |
| 2015 | Anugerah Planet Muzik 2015 | Social Media Icon | Shila Amzah | Nominated | Malaysia Singapore Indonesia | |
| 2015 | 第15届全球华语歌曲颁奖典礼; 15th Global Chinese Music Awards | Malaysia Most Outstanding Artist | 茜拉 Shila Amzah | Nominated | Singapore | |
| 2015 | 第15届全球华语歌曲颁奖典礼; 15th Global Chinese Music Awards | Best Female Singer on Stage Performer | 茜拉 Shila Amzah | Won | Singapore | |
| 2015 | 广州音乐先锋榜2015颁奖典礼; Guangzhou Music Awards 2015 | Female Artist of the Year (Hong Kong & Taiwan) | 茜拉 Shila Amzah | Won | China | |
| 2015 | 广州音乐先锋榜2015颁奖典礼; Guangzhou Music Awards 2015 | Most Popular Female Artist (Hong Kong & Taiwan) | 茜拉 Shila Amzah | Won | China | |
| 2015 | 新城勁爆頒獎禮2015; Metro Radio Music Awards 2015 | Metro Radio National Idol | 茜拉 Shila Amzah | Won | Hong Kong | |
| 2015 | 新城勁爆頒獎禮2015; Metro Radio Music Awards 2015 | Metro Radio Mandarin Song of the Year | "再見 Goodbye" | Won | Hong Kong | |
| 2016 | Ministry of International Trade and Industry; Malaysia External Trade Development Corporation | Outstanding Export Achievement Award | Shila Amzah | Special Award | Malaysia | |
| 2018 | Forbes 30 Under 30 (Asia) | Entertainment and Celebrity | Shila Amzah | Won | Malaysia United States China | |
| 2018 | Asia Music Festival | Most Popular International Female Singer | Shila Amzah | Won | Malaysia United States China | Hong Kong |
| 2022 | 36th Anugerah Juara Lagu | Champion | "Pelukan Angkasa" | Won | Malaysia | Hong Kong |
| 2022 The Masked Singer Malaysia | The Masked Singer Malaysia | "Rambutan/Shila Amzah" | Won | Malaysia | | |
