= One in a Million season 3 =

One in a Million
- Season 3
- Hosted by: Awal Ashari; Marion Caunter
- Judges: Syafinaz Selamat; Paul Moss
- No. of contestants: 12
- Winner: Tomok
- Runner-up: Esther
- Finals venue: Stadium Malawati, Shah Alam, Selangor
- No. of episodes: 18

Release
- Original network: 8TV
- Original release: 23 January – 1 May 2009

Season chronology
- ← Previous; Season 2

The third season of the Malaysian TV series One in a Million aired from 23 January to 1 May 2009, was won by Shah Indrawan Ismail, the first male and first established artist.

== Auditions ==
The preliminary auditions for season three of One in a Million were held in the following locations:

City	Venue	Date	Notes
Kota Kinabalu, Sabah	Imperial International Hotel	15 November 2008	437 people auditioned.
Kuching, Sarawak	Merdeka Palace Hotel & Suites	15 November 2008	
Johor Bahru, Johor	The Puteri Pacific	22 November 2008	
Georgetown, Penang	Sunway Hotel	22 November 2008	About 200 people auditioned.
Kuala Lumpur	Berjaya Times Square	29 November 2008	More than 1200 people auditioned.

This time, auditions were open to hopefuls aged 16 to 32, compared to the previous season's 18-30 limit. Besides these, pre-audition road shows were held in these cities (two weeks before their respective auditions), featuring promotions for One in a Million and performances by OIAM alumni from both past seasons.

All preliminary auditions were preceded by different judges. Those who qualified from the auditions underwent another audition stage in Berjaya Times Square on 30 November and 1 December, where they met Paul Moss and Syafinaz. The telecast on 8TV began with footage from this stage, unlike in previous seasons which began with the individual preliminary auditions.

Not unlike in previous seasons, artistes who still or used to hold recording contracts were still welcome, but this time around, they skipped the preliminary auditions to participate on the main audition on 1 December, in the Gardens Hotel, Mid Valley. Among those who qualified included Norafizah Mohd Yasin, winner of TV3's Mentor; Tomok, lead vocalist of New Boyz; Amylea Azizan, Akademi Fantasia alumnus.

== Top 12 Finalist ==
According to the order of elimination.

Contestant	Age	Hometown	Ranking
Shah Indrawan bin Ismail (Tomok)	25	Cheras, Kuala Lumpur	Winner
Elizabeth Applunius Chin (Esther)	21	Kota Kinabalu, Sabah	Runner-up
Nasharul Aweera bin Norhissham (Aweera)	18	Kangar, Perlis	Third place
Zulqarnain bin Jaafar (Nine)	27	Alor Setar, Kedah	4th
Amylea binti Azizan (Amylea)	22	Ampang, Selangor	5th
Simon Christopher Michael (Simon)	26	Sungai Petani, Kedah	6th
Muhd Ridzuan bin Shariffudin (Rizu)	19	Klang, Selangor	7th
Fify Emielia Shazlin binti Ahmad Murshidi (Fify)	19	Klang, Selangor	8th
Anith Aqilah binti Sulaiman Lim (Anith)	17	Batu Caves, Selangor	9th
Norafizah binti Mohd Yasin (Pija)	20	Ampang, Selangor	10th
Rehana binti Mohd Yunus (Han)	21	Labuan	11th
Nur Hidayu binti Mohd Tekhary (Ayu)	20	Batu Caves, Selangor	12th

== Central Eliminations ==
Only eighty have qualified into the Central Eliminations round held in Peninsula Residence, Damansara from 11 till 19 December (aired on 6 and 13 February). A major twist in this season is the Blind Test, in which contestants performed behind a paper screen, only to have their shadows seen by the judges which focused on their voices, brought forward as the first challenge. According to Moss, he and Syafinaz would have found it more effective to sort out the more desirable voices. 20 have been eliminated from this stage.

Secondly, came the group singing in which the remaining sixty formed into groups of six or seven, each of which are all of the same gender. The female groups chose between One Step at a Time (Jordin Sparks) and Cinta di Akhir Garisan (Ziana Zain); while the males had Juwita (Citra Terindah) (M. Nasir) or My Girl (The Temptations). Another 20 were sent packing after this test.

The remaining forty were divided into the Top 20 and Bottom 20 based on the judges' evaluation, after which each of the Top 20 picked an MP3 player from a table, studies the song in it, and chose a duet partner from the Bottom 20. Paul Moss remarked had he been in the Top 20, he would pick a weaker contestant to gain an edge into the next stage. Having said that, the twenty best finalists were selected not based on being the better in their respective pairs.

The Central Eliminations concluded with a one-on-one final evaluation in which each contestant went on stage either alone or in a pair, sang on their own in front of the judges, each contestant was shown their fate immediately after their performance ends. As is of the previous seasons, only 12 make it into the competition rounds.

== Performances ==
The competitive performances are held every Friday, going on-air at 9.30 pm, beginning 20 February 2009, in Sri Pentas 2, Plaza Alam Sentral, Shah Alam. The surprise of the season is, each week from Top 12 till Top 7, an immunity will be granted to the week's best performer as per judges' evaluation, which exempts him/her from the voting sessions, thus guaranteeing him/her a spot in each coming week's performances. As usual, voting lines open only after the show, with which viewers send in SMSes to vote in or out each contestant. The finalist with the lowest votes leaves at the beginning of each coming week's show.

=== Week 1: Top 12 (20 February 2009) ===
The Top 12 opened their first night with the song Itu Kamu (originally sung by Estranged).

Contestant	Song (original artist)
Anith	"That's What You Get" (Paramore)
Amylea	"Aku Skandal" (Hujan)
Simon	"Home" (Daughtry)
Ayu	"Matahariku" (Agnes Monica)
Fify	"If I Were A Boy" (Beyoncé Knowles)
Aweera	"Aku Dah Bosan" (Amy Search)
Pija	"Lagu Untukmu" (MUH)
Nine	"Cinta Ini Membunuhku" (d'Masiv)
Han	"Menjaga Hati" (Yovie & Nuno)
Tomok	"Coba" (Faizal Tahir)
Esther	"Better In Time" (Leona Lewis)
Rizu	"Juwita Citra Terindah" (M. Nasir)

- Immunity: Esther

The judges announced the immunity system as their surprise after all 12 performed individually, with Esther being first given the honour to be exempt from the decisive public voting.

=== Week 2: Top 11 - Memori Tercipta (27 February 2009) ===
The theme of the night was "Memori Tercipta" ("A Memory is Born"), songs which remind them of someone).

- Guest judge: Salamiah Hassan
- Eliminated: Ayu - "Makhluk Tuhan Paling Sexy" (Mulan Jameela)

Contestant	Song (original artist)
Esther	"Mengenangmu" (Kerispatih)
Han	"Getaran Jiwa" (P. Ramlee)
Simon	"Knockin' On Heaven's Door" (Guns N' Roses)
Nine	"Berita Dari Rantau" (Alleycats)
Amylea	"Akan Tiba" (Alif Satar)
Rizu	"My Way" (Frank Sinatra)
Anith	"Rindu" (Hetty Koes Endang)
Tomok	"Rahsia Pohon Cemara" (Exists)
Aweera	"She's Gone" (Steelheart)
Pija	"Since U Been Gone" (Avril Lavigne)
Fify	"Tak Tercapai Akalmu" (Elyana)

- Immunity: Amylea

=== Week 3: Top 10 (6 March 2009) ===
- Guest judge: Jaclyn Victor
- Eliminated: Han - "I Don't Want to Miss a Thing" (Aerosmith).

Contestant	Song (original artist)
Amylea	"Bohemian Rhapsody" (Queen)
Nine	"Hapus Aku" (Nidji)
Fify	"Hot N Cold" (Katy Perry)
Simon	"Juwita" (Saleem)
Anith	"Pilihlah Aku" (Krisdayanti)
Rizu	"Sandaran Hati" (Letto)
Pija	"So What?" (P!nk)
Aweera	"Gemilang" (Jaclyn Victor)
Esther	"I Try" (Macy Gray)
Tomok	"Crazy In Love" (Beyoncé Knowles)

- Immunity: Aweera

=== Week 4: Top 9 - Songwriters' Week (13 March 2009) ===
Finalists selected from ten contemporary Malaysian songs and sought guidance from the songs' respective composer.

(Composers' names given if not the same person as the original singer.)

- Guest judge: Fauzi Marzuki
- Eliminated: Pija - "Satu Harapan" (Jaclyn Victor, Audi Mok)

Contestant	Song (original artist)	Songwriter
Aweera	"Janjiku" (Sofaz)	Taja
Amylea	"Yang Pernah" (Estranged)	Estranged
Fify	"Kalis Rindu" (Elyana)	Aidit Alfian
Rizu	"Cinta" (Flop Poppy)	Andy
Tomok	"La La La Kerjalah" (Meet Uncle Hussain)	Taja
Anith	"Mungkin" (Anuar Zain)	Pacai
Nine	"Aku Dan Kamu" (Flop Poppy)	Andy
Esther	"Dialah Dihati" (Dato' Siti Nurhaliza)	Aidit Alfian
Simon	"Generasiku" (OAG)	Audi Mok

- Immunity: Tomok

=== Week 5: Top 8 - Opposites Attract (20 March 2009) ===
Each contestant performed a song originally recorded by singers of the different gender from theirs.

- Guest judge: Jay Jay
- Eliminated: Anith - "Kerna Kamu" (Faizal Tahir)
- Group performance: "Seksis" (Anita Sarawak)

Contestant	Song (original artist)
Tomok	"Gantung" (Melly Goeslaw)
Amylea	"I'm Yours" (Jason Mraz)
Aweera	"Tiada Lagi" (Mayangsari)
Rizu	"Mercy" (Duffy)
Simon	"When You're Gone" (Avril Lavigne)
Fify	"Pria Terhebat" (Sheila on 7)
Nine	"Karma" (Cokelat)
Esther	"Won't Go Home Without You" (Maroon 5)

- Immunity: Esther

=== Week 6: Top 7 (27 March 2009) ===
- Guest judge: Francissca Peter
- Eliminated: Fify - "Don't Speak" (No Doubt)

Contestant	Song (original artist)
Esther	"I Dont't Love You" (My Chemical Romance)
Rizu	"Naluri Lelaki" (Samsons)
Simon	"Eternity" (Robbie Williams)
Aweera	"Enter Sandman" (Metallica)
Amylea	"Satu Dalam Sejuta" (Amylea); Composed & Lyric: Amylea Azizan
Nine	"Nakal" (Gigi)
Tomok	"Ingin Bersamamu" (Syafinaz)

- Immunity: Tomok

Amylea introduced an original composition of hers for the first time in this performing week; however it did not suffice for the judges who eventually granted Tomok his second immunity for improvising one of Syafinaz's songs.

=== Week 7: Top 6 (3 April 2009) ===
The judges announced that no new immunity would be granted for the rest of the competition, thus resting the fate of all six finalists completely in the hands of the voting audience.

- Eliminated: Rizu - "She Will Be Loved" (Maroon 5)

Contestant	Song (original singer)
Tomok	"Umbrella" (Rihanna feat Jay Z)
Amylea	"Somewhere Only We Know" (Keane)
Esther	"Sweet About Me" (Gabriella Cilmi)
Nine	"Cinta Gila" (Grey Sky Morning)
Aweera	"Di Penjara Janji" (Awie)
Simon	"Livin On A Prayer" (Bon Jovi)

The Top 6 show lasted for just over an hour due to the decimated number of contestants and the time saved as the result of the immunity system being revoked.

=== Week 8: Top 5 - Tribute to Sheila Majid (10 April 2009) ===
Contestants took on Sheila Majid's hit songs.

- Guest judge: Sheila Majid
- Eliminated: Simon - "Ku Mohon"

Contestant	Song
Amylea	"Dia"
Aweera	"Antara Anyor Dan Jakarta"
Nine	"Pengemis Muda"
Esther	"Lagenda"
Tomok	"Aku Cinta Padamu"

- Group performance: "Jatuh Hati"

=== Week 9: Top 4 - In Concert (17 April 2009) ===
Each contestant was to pull off a concert-like, themed performance for approximately four minutes. Three of them did medleys.

- Guest performance: Shila and Dafi - RENTAK OPTIMIS aka Camnilah
- Eliminated: Amylea - "I'm Yours" (Jason Mraz)

Contestant	Song (original artist)
Nine	"Keroncong Untuk Ana" (M. Nasir)
Tomok	"Jika Kau Bercinta Lagi" + "Sekuntum Mawar Merah Sebuah Puisi" (Alleycats)
Esther	"One Night Only" (Jennifer Hudson) + "Semua Jadi Satu" (3 Diva) + "Keeps Gettin' Better" (Christina Aguilera)
Aweera	"Tak Ada Logika" (Agnes Monica) + "Emansipasi" (Republic Of Brickfields)

=== Week 10: Top 3 - Judges and fans' favourites (24 April 2009) ===
The finalists were to repeat two songs which they performed through the weeks of the competition from Top 12 till Top 5.

- Eliminated: Nine - "Karma" (Cokelat)

Contestant	Judges' Choice	Fans' Choice
Tomok	"Crazy In Love" (Beyoncé Knowles)	"Coba" (Faizal Tahir)
Esther	"Better In Time" (Leona Lewis)	"Won't Go Home Without You" (Maroon 5)
Aweera	"Gemilang" (Jaclyn Victor)	"Aku Dah Bosan" (Amy Search)

=== Week 11: Top 3 - Grand Final (1 May 2009) ===
The final stage of the competition was held in Stadium Malawati, Shah Alam, on 1 May 2009. Tomok narrowly escaped elimination after being announced to have the fewest votes at the moment, as a result of a week-long opinion poll set up by 8TV in which fans chose all three to compete rather than only two of them. Votes from last week's performances were carried forward to the one-hour showdown throughout which viewers could vote for the last time. Each contestant was assigned two SMS lines and one landline in anticipation of a major influx of votes.

1st Round Performances

Contestant	Song (original artist)
Aweera	"Sampai Syurga" (Faizal Tahir) + "My Baby You" (Marc Anthony) + "Hukum Karma" (Wings)
Esther	"Menggapai Mimpi" (Esther); Composed: Sharon Paul; Lyric: Lew Mable
Tomok	"Hanya Kau Yang Mampu" (Aizat Amdan)

2nd Round Performances

Contestant	Song (original artist)
Aweera	"Ku Disini" (Aweera); Composed: Lin Li Zhen; Lyric: Pacha Osman
Esther	"Don't Stop The Music" (Rihanna)
Tomok	"Rindu Terhenti" (Tomok); Composed: Aubrey Suwito; Lyric: Tinta S

- Third place: Aweera
- Runner-up: Esther
- Champion: Tomok

At 10.30 pm, Tomok was announced the winner of OIAM3.

== Elimination chart ==
Order	Weekly Concerts											
Order	Contestant	Week 1 (20/Feb)	Week 2 (27/Feb)	Week 3 (06/Mar)	Week 4 (13/Mar)	Week 5 (20/Mar)	Week 6 (27/Mar)	Week 7 (03/Apr)	Week 8 (10/Apr)	Week 9 (17/Apr)	Semifinal (24/Apr)	Finale (01/May)
1	Tomok	—N/a	Safe	Safe	Immunity	Safe	Immunity	Safe	Safe	Safe	Safe	Champion
2	Esther	Immunity	Safe	Safe	Safe	Immunity	Safe	Safe	Safe	Safe	Safe	2nd place
3	Aweera	—N/a	Safe	Immunity	Safe	Safe	Safe	Safe	Safe	Safe	Safe	3rd place
4	Nine	—N/a	Safe	Safe	Safe	Safe	Safe	Safe	Safe	Safe	Eliminated	
5	Amylea	—N/a	Immunity	Safe	Safe	Safe	Safe	Safe	Safe	Eliminated		
6	Simon	—N/a	Safe	Safe	Safe	Safe	Safe	Safe	Eliminated			
7	Rizu	—N/a	Safe	Safe	Safe	Safe	Safe	Eliminated				
8	Fify	—N/a	Safe	Safe	Safe	Safe	Eliminated					
9	Anith	—N/a	Safe	Safe	Safe	Eliminated						
10	Pija	—N/a	Safe	Safe	Eliminated							
11	Han	—N/a	Safe	Eliminated								
12	Ayu	—N/a	Eliminated									

Clues

- Male contestants
- Female contestants
- Champion / Winner
- Second place / Runner-up
- Third place
- Safe
- Immunity
- Eliminated

Trivia

- At the seventh week concert, the immunity system was withdrawn and stopped.
