= Shila Amzah Love Live in Malaysia Concert =

2014 single day concert by Shila Amzah

Shila Amzah Love Live in Malaysia
- Concert by Shila Amzah
- Location: Kuala Lumpur, Malaysia
- Venue: Mega Star Arena
- Associated album: Sha-Hila, Bebaskan, Shila Amzah
- Date: September 13, 2014
- Supporting act: James Yang
- Attendance: 2000

Shila Amzah concert chronology
- Shila Amzah Love Live in Shanghai; Shila Amzah Love Live in Malaysia; Shila Amzah Colorful Live in Hong Kong

Shila Amzah Love Live in Malaysia (or: 茜拉爱住在马来西亚的演唱会) was a single day concert by Malaysian singer-songwriter, Shila Amzah. The concert was jointly organized by Shila Amzah Entertainment Bhd., Mega Ultimate Sdn Bhd., AirAsia, Alexandre Christieas, My FM, Era FM, Paradigm Mall and Premiere Hotel. It received positive feedback and reviews from concert reviewers and critics who praised Shila's vocals and overall showmanship.

Shila Amzah previously had launched her very first concert on August 16, 2014 at Shanghai, China and has received many positive remarks from the audiences. In fact, the concert at Shanghai was actually sold out. There were approximately 2,000 people who have attended the concert and the audiences are from multiple races. Some of Shila’s Beijing fans have also flew all the way from China to attend her concert at her own country, Malaysia.

== Performances ==
=== Fashion and stage ===
Shila Amzah Love Live in Malaysia marked Shila Amzah's first ever solo concert to be organized in Malaysia. Her makeup for the night was provided by Fiza Zainuddin while her dresses were designed by Raffiey Nasir.

=== Synopsis ===
As the kick start of the show, Shila began her first performance with “Yang Teristimewa” and “Bebaskan/Ada Sahaja”. She has composed and written these songs at a very young age as one of the songs was actually created by her at the age of 13 years old. Throughout the show, Shila has spoken in multiple languages including Malay, Chinese and English so that all of her audiences could understand her. She also said that, regardless of the races who have attended the concert, everyone is actually one big family.

Shila then proceeded with a signature song, "Zheng Fu", much to her fans' delight.

She has altered some of the song lyrics and even mixed-and-matched different versions or languages of songs during her performance on stage. The most prominent one is during her performance of “Ji De. Shila has sung cover for “Ji De” in Malay version before. During her concert this time, she has mixed the Mandarin version as well as Malay version together.

During Shila Amzah Love Live in Shanghai, she has invited Evan Guo as her guest artist. In Shila Amzah Love Live in Malaysia Concert, she has invited a James Yang, who is famous for his song, “Long Time No See". They have performed that song together on stage. After their duet, James have also performed another song titled “忘了我是谁”. During this song, he has come down from the stage to interact with the audiences.

During the concert, Shila has also surprised the audience by performing K-pop song by EXO titled Overdose. She said that language is not a barrier for music.

During her participation in I Am a Singer (season 2), her performance of "Xiang Ni De Ye" has amazed all of the audiences including the original singer himself. Besides this song, she also sang "Zui Chang De Dian Ying" which she has also performed during I Am a Singer (season 2).

During the concert, she has featured a medley consisting of Wang Lee Hom’s songs. Besides, she has also done a medley performance of Beyoncé’s Songs! She danced along with the dancers during the medley. Medias describe it as "Her performance during this medley was very energetic and lively!".

During her concert, she has interacted a lot with the fans and some of her speech were really hilarious. For example, she told the fans regarding how much she likes Wang LeeHom and she jokingly said that she was very sad when she knew that he was married. She asked the audiences whether she has really gained some weights because a few netizen commented on her social media that she’s fat. Well, the audiences replied, “No!”. Hearing the response, she jokingly replied that she could eat without much worries then.

Afterwards, Shila gave a speech regarding patriotism as well as love during her performance of “Warisan”. She said that while she was dedicating the song for her beloved country, the real dedication of the song was for her father. She has invited her father to go on stage to sing with her.

After Shila’s performance of her which is "Memori Tercipta", the audiences did not leave the hall and they screamed for an encore. Without disappointing the fans, Shila came back on stage with her song "Patah Seribu" which was blended with her Mandarin version, "Xia Yi Bu". All of the fans have gathered closer to the stage during the performance of this song. Shila has taken a selfie on stage with all of her fans as the background.

== Set list ==
1. Band
  1. Yang Teristimewa
  2. Bebaskan/Ada Saja
  3. 征服
  4. 记得
  5. Masih Aku Cinta
  6. 好久不见 (Duet with James Yang)
  7. Maaf
  8. Sedar
  9. Overdose
  10. Cinta Hati
  11. 想你的夜
  12. 最长的电影
  13. Wang Lee Hom Medley
  14. 天神记
  15. Tulus
  16. A Moment Like This
  17. Warisan
  18. Beyonce Medley
  19. Memori Tercipta
2. Encore
  1. Patah Seribu
  2. 下一步
