= Shila Amzah =

Malaysian singer-songwriter

Shila Amzah نورشهيلا بنت أمير عامزه AMN
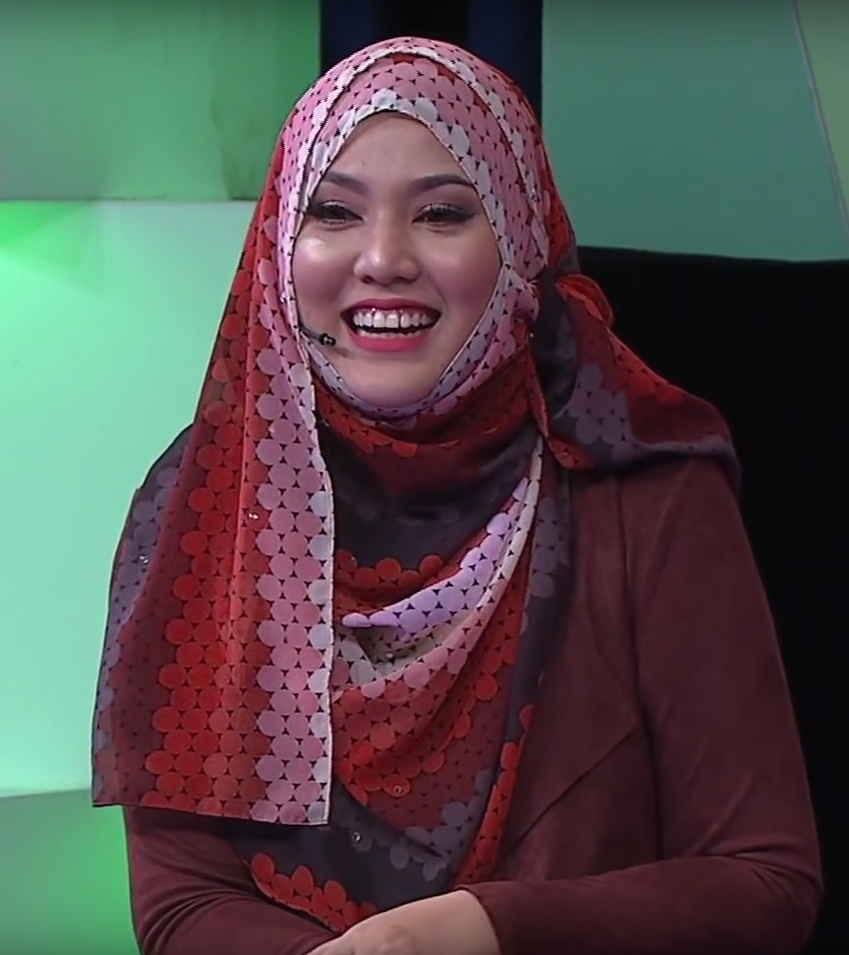
- Shila in 2016
- Born: Nurshahila binti Amir Amzah; 13 August 1990 (age 35); Kuala Lumpur, Malaysia
- Occupations: Singer-songwriter; actress; businesswoman; record producer
- Years active: 2000–present
- Agent: Greyscale
- Spouses: Haris Idraki Elias (m. 2018; div. 2022) Muhammad Ubaidillah Mohd Zulkefli (m. 2023)
- Children: Seth Uwais Haris Idraki
- Parents: Amir Amzah Salleh (father); Fauziah Sarman (mother)
- Musical career
- Genres: Pop; mandopop
- Instruments: Vocals; guitar; piano
- Labels: EMI; Monkey Bone; Shanghai; Shila Amzah

Nurshahila binti Amir Amzah (born 13 August 1990) better known as Shila Amzah is a Malaysian singer-songwriter. Born and raised in Kuala Lumpur, she began going to recording studios at the age of four with her father and recorded a pop studio album five years later. With the help of a famous Malaysian record producer, in 2005 Shila released her second pop studio album, Sha-Hila. Her single "Patah Seribu" (2011) received Pop Song of the Year and Song of the Year at the 19th Malaysian Music Awards.

She continued her singing career by breaking out to Shanghai, China and eventually won the Asian Wave. As a result, Shila received the Kembara Award (International Music Breakthrough Award) from Malaysian Music Awards making Shila the youngest Kembara Award honoree. Afterwards, Shila continued her singing career in mandopop industry by breaking out to Hong Kong in 2015 by releasing some new singles, doing an international press conference and establishing her second record label and global management company, Shilala (HK) Limited. Her success on international stages has gained her honorific titles such as Asia's Sweetheart, Princess of Music, and National Treasure of Malaysia.

Shila was the first runner-up of Bintang Kecil RTM in 2000, first runner-up of One in a Million (season 2), winner of Asia New Singer Competition in 2008, second runner-up of I Am a Singer (season 2) in 2014, and first runner-up of Anugerah Juara Lagu in 2011 and 2015. Before the Asian Wave, she performed a duet with Miley Cyrus called "The Best of Both Worlds" to promote Hannah Montana in Malaysia. In 2013, Shila was the first and only Malay artist to be invited to the Global Chinese Music Awards (GCMA).

She is the first and only Malay artist to have success in Chinese-speaking countries and Chinese record charts with her Sina Weibo account having more than 2.3 million followers. She was listed in the Forbes' 30 Under 30 Asia (2018), recognizing young leaders, entrepreneurs and game changers from across Asia under Entertainment and Sports category.

Shila used the stage name "NurShahila" name when she was a child. In 2004, she changed her name to Sha-Hila as her record company, EMI, wanted her name to be shorter. When she joined the One in a Million singing contest she needed to make her name even shorter. The organiser of One in a Million (Season 2) truncated her name to just Shila. After coming in as the first runner-up of One in A Million (season 2), she was called "Shila OIAM". She didn't like the name, so she added "Amzah" to her stage name, as her father's name is Amir Amzah. In Chinese-speaking countries, Shila's name is 茜拉 (Xīlā).

== Early life ==
Nurshahila binti Amir Amzah was born on 13 August 1990, in Setapak, Kuala Lumpur, Malaysia. Her father, Malay: Amir Amzah Salleh, who used the stage name ND Lala, was a recording artist in the 1980s and her mother, Fauziah Sarman, was an actress. She comes from a musically inclined family: her younger sister, Nur Syuhada, whose stage name is Syada Amzah, is also a performer. She attended Sekolah Menengah Kebangsaan Setapak Indah, Kuala Lumpur.

== Career ==
=== 2000–2007: Early commercial success ===
Before Shila made her debut appearance as a child, her father struggled to get her a chance to showcase her singing. At that time, there were no recording companies that wanted to sign children as recording artists as they did not want to take the risk. So her father used his own money to produce her first album. In 2000, Shila's debut album, Terima Kasih Guru that was launched in the presence of Tun Dr Siti Hasmah, wife of Malaysia's fourth Prime Minister, Tun Dr Mahathir. She later signed a contract with EMI. With EMI, she released the album Sha-Hila with the hit song "Yang Teristimewa".

=== 2007–2009: Career development ===
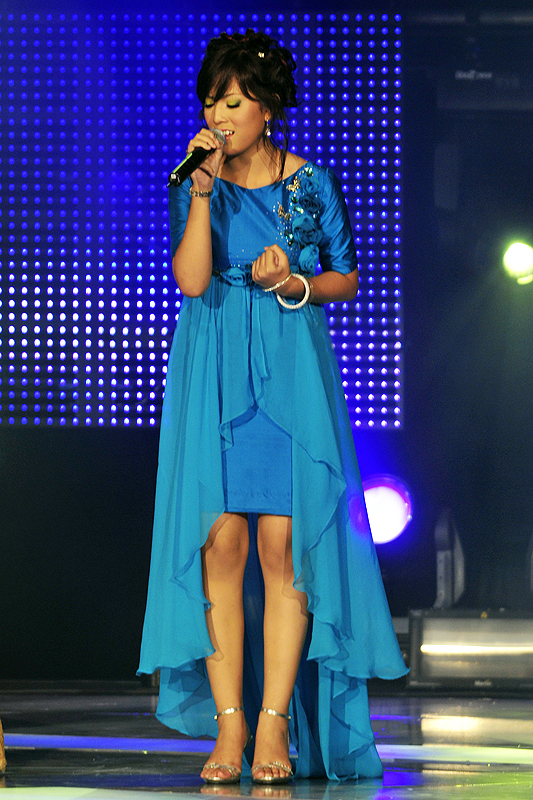
Amzah in 2009

After her contract with EMI ended in 2007, she joined One in a Million (Season 2) and emerged as first runner-up of the competition. The nickname "Shila" was given by the organisers of One in a Million as her SMS voting code and name during the singing competition. On the night of the Grand Finale of One in a Million (season 2), Shila was assigned to sing a new song called "Memori Tercipta" (Memories Created). She lost to Norayu Damit, but both of them were given recording contracts from Monkey Bone Records.

Throughout the competition, Shila sang:

- Top 12: "Tak Ada Logika"
- Week 1: "Too Little Too Late"
- Week 2: "Stuck"
- Week 3: "Oops!... I Did It Again"
- Week 4: "Di Bawah Pohon Asmara "
- Week 5: "I'll Be There"
- Week 6: "Car Wash"
- Week 7: "Khayal" with Alif Satar
- Week 8: "Contigo en la Distancia"
- Week 9: "Bukan Milikmu and Love Like This"
- Grand Finale: "Contigo en la Distancia", "Memori Tercipta" and "Oops!... I Did It Again with Stuck" Medley

She produced the album Bebaskan (Set It Free) during her stint with Monkey Bone Records. The album was launched in 2009. With 12 songs, featuring the works of Malaysian composers such as Aubrey Suwito, Audi Mok, Kieran Kuek and Mode, as well as Australian composer Jamie Huber.

=== 2010–2012: Career expansion ===
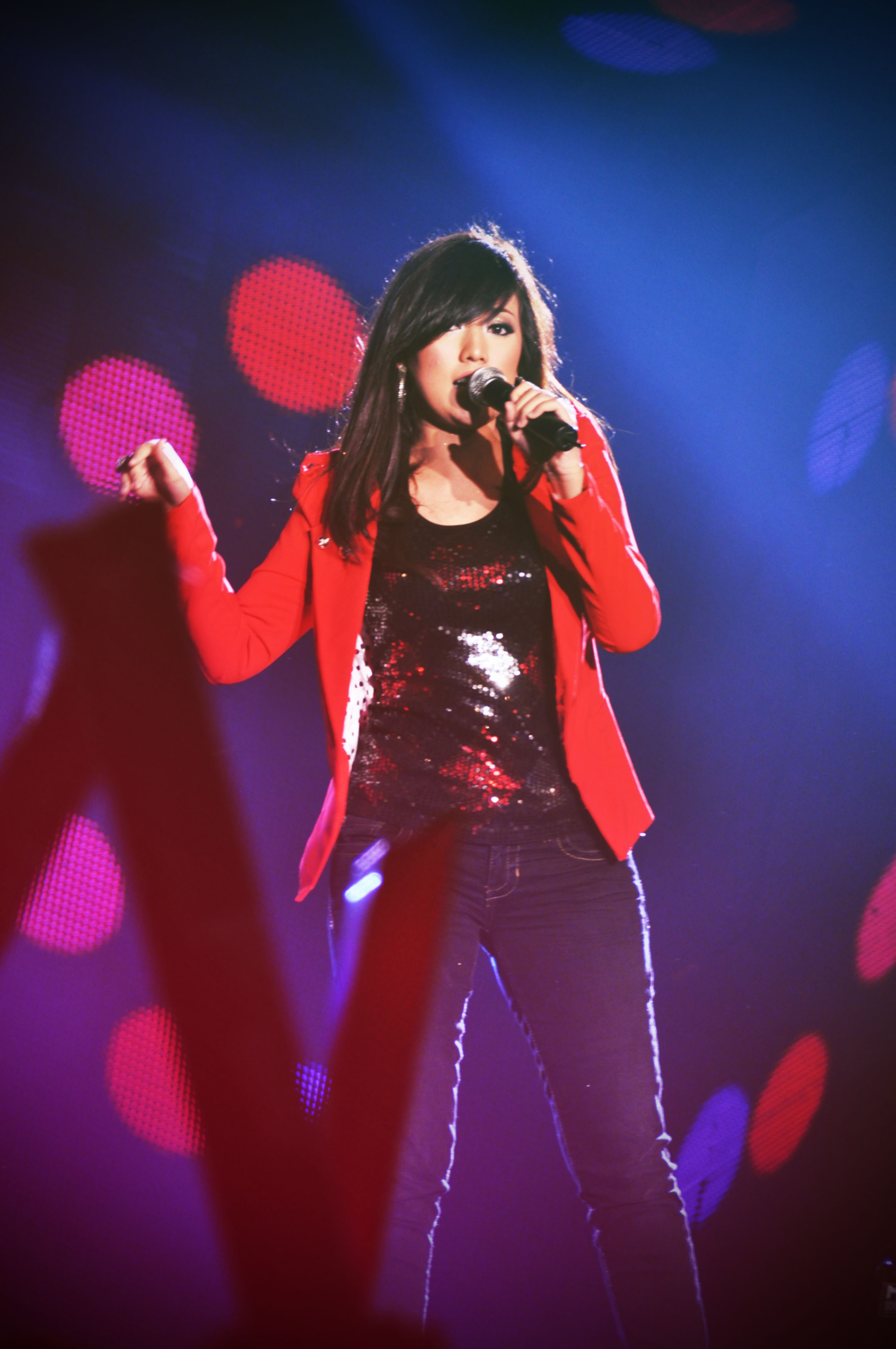
Amzah in 2011

3 Suara (English: 3 Voices) is a collaborative album by Malaysian singers Jaclyn Victor, Ning Baizura and Shila Amzah. The album was released on 6 January 2011, through Euphoric Pte. Limited. One of Shila's songs was "Patah Seribu". The song appeared on many television shows and received a lot of radio airtime. The song was nominated at the Malaysian Music Awards for Best Female Vocal Performance and Most Popular Regional Song and won Pop Song of the Year and Song of the Year. The song was released as a single on iTunes on 20 July 2012 by Urustabil and was later added as a bonus track to her fifth studio album, Shila Amzah, released by Shila Amzah Entertainment Berhad.

=== 2012–2014: Early international stardom ===
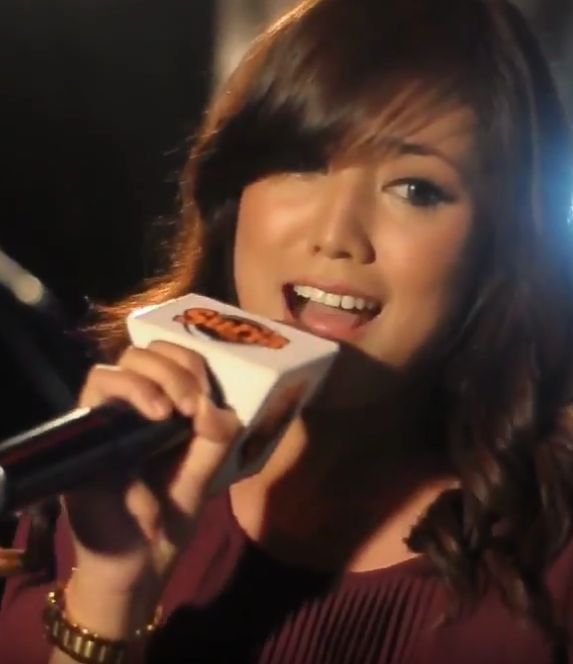
Amzah in 2012

In September 2012, she was invited to join the inaugural competition of Asian Wave, a Chinese reality singing talent show held in Shanghai, China, after her father, ND Lala submitted her videos singing. On 20 September 2012, Shila became the champion. It was at this point that she started to focus on her career in China. Shila had the most online votes among all the contestants. She sang three songs: "Gemilang" by Jaclyn Victor, "Grenade" by Bruno Mars, and "Zheng Fu" by Na Ying. She also sang "Forever Love" by Wang Leehom and "Set Fire to the Rain" by Adele in one of the preliminary rounds. The panel of 10 judges-comprising the region's top stars like Malaysia's Eric Moo, Hong Kong's Hacken Lee, China's Sun Nan, Taiwan's Phil Chang and Jerry Huang-gave her a standing ovation, while Chinese composer Gao Xiaosong praised her by saying, "You gave me goose bumps. You broke my heart." She was signed to a 6-year recording contract with Shanghai Media Group and received 5 Million MYR.

Episode	Song	Language	Original Singer	Result	Defeat
Preliminary (Rounds 1)	Set Fire to the Rain	English	Adele	Advance to Preliminary Round 2	(Singapore) Rachel Chua save by judges selection
Preliminary (Rounds 2)	Forever Love	Mandarin	Wang Leehom	Advance to Final Round 1	(Japan) Emi Tawata save by judges selection
Final (Rounds 1)	Gemilang	Malay	Jaclyn Victor	Advance to Final Round 2	(Thailand) Ten Nararak Eliminated
Final (Rounds 2)	Grenade	English	Bruno Mars	Advance to Final Round 3	(China) Guo Yifan Eliminated
Final (Rounds 3)	征服 (Zhengfu, "Conquer")	Mandarin	Na Ying	Champion	(China) Chang Shilei Lost
Final (Rounds 3)	征服 (Zhengfu, "Conquer")	Mandarin	Na Ying	Champion	(China) Henry Huo Lost

- Shila managed to advance all rounds by winning the battle.
- Winning the battle: Majority green light pushed by judges (similar to coaches of The Voice in selecting their team).
- Other contestant either advanced through winning the battle, judges' selection or by a cappella battle as a second chance.
- Furthermore, there is some contestant that also advanced by extra battle as judges couldn't reach consensus on making their selection.

In 2013 she was nominated for the Nickelodeon Kids Choice Awards for Favourite Asian Act with PSY (South Korea), Han Geng (China), and Sarah Geronimo from the Philippines. Harian Metro reported on 12 March 2013, that Shila has set up her own record company by the name of Shila Amzah Entertainment Berhad.

In July 2013, Shanghai Media Group released "A Moment Like This", Shila's debut Chinese single in China. This single was the theme song for the inaugural competition of Chinese Idol. She was invited to perform this song live during the grand finale of the show.

At the end of 2013, Shila released her fifth studio album, Shila Amzah released under Shila Amzah Entertainment and distributed by Warner Music Malaysia. All songs and lyrics of the album was fully composed by Shila with the guidance of Helen Yap. The album consisted of seven songs including two bonus tracks. The album preview was held at Red Box Plus, Pavilion, Kuala Lumpur, Malaysia on 5 July 2013. A further showcase of the album was held at Penthouse, The Icon, Kuala Lumpur, Malaysia on 10 October 2013. The album were produced by Shila, Helen Yap, and Aubrey Suwito, and the sound engineers were Aubrey Suwito, Zairi Ariffin, Yusalman Azua, Hadie Pranoto, Amir Sulaiman and Greg Henderson. The album received nominations from the 21st Malaysian Music Awards which is Album of the Year and Engineered Album of the Year. The self-titled album, Shila Amzah was released on digital and streaming platforms on 10 December 2013. In December 2013, Shila released a video of "Masih Aku Cinta". This music video was based on her love story when she broke up with Sharnaaz Ahmad, a Malaysian actor after a controversy involving Sharnaaz Ahmad with Shila's father.

The Star reported on 27 September 2012, that she was chosen to be the opening act for a series of concerts in Beijing by Malaysian singer-composer Eric Moo, starting 17 November. Shila said that she knew him because "he was one of the judges during the competition and his invitation is a huge honor for me". She gave her agreement when he courted her to be part of his opening act. The Eric Moo–Shila Amzah Love Hurricane Concert was eventually held on 24 July 2014.

In February 2014, Shila's manager got her an invitation to I Am a Singer (Season 2). In the 7th round, aired 21 February 2014, she performed the song "Xiang Ni De Ye", a song originally sung by Chinese pop star Guan Zhe. After the performance her Weibo followers increased rapidly from 1 thousand to over 2 million. In the Breakthrough round, aired 21 March 2014, she reached first place by singing a cover of "Rolling in the Deep". Shila's popularity rose in China after I Am a Singer aired beside her performance at the Asian Wave.

Throughout the show, she showed versatility in her range of music styles, from languages (Chinese and English), performance methods (dancing while singing) and musical styles (high note, pop, R&B, rap). On 4 April 2014, she came third overall, losing to Han Lei from China and Tang Tsz Kei from Hong Kong.

Through I Am a Singer (Season 2), she was able to adapt to a new language quickly. Being a non-Chinese speaker or singer, she only needed two days to learn a new Chinese song. I Am a Singer (season 2) helped her in gaining a larger base of China, Taiwan, and Hong Kong fans. Currently, she attends Mandarin classes in Beijing and is working on improving her Mandarin.

Episode		Airdate	Song	Original Singer	Result
7 (4th Qualifying Round)		21 February 2014	"想你的夜" (Mandarin)	Guan Zhe	2
8 (4th Knockout Round)		28 February 2014	"最长的电影" (Mandarin)	Jay Chou	4
9 (5th Qualifying Round)		7 March 2014	"Listen" (English)	Beyoncé	3
10 (5th Knockout Round)		14 March 2014	"Forever Love" (Mandarin)	Wang Leehom	3
11 (Breakout)		21 March 2014	"Rolling in the Deep" (English)	Adele	1
12 (Semifinal)		28 March 2014	"洋葱" (Mandarin)	Aska	6
13	(1st Final Round)	4 April 2014	"When You Believe" (English)	Whitney Houston, Mariah Carey	—
13	(2nd Final Round)	4 April 2014	"MAMA" (Mandarin)	EXO-M	3

- Shila made her debut in 7th Round as she replaced eliminated singer earlier based on the program basic rule.
- Basic rule: There must be seven talented singers as contestants on each episode.

=== 2015–2017: Hong Kong music scene breakthrough ===
On 22 April 2015, Shila held a Shila Amzah: The Symbol of Love, International Press Conference at Mira Hotel, Hong Kong. During the press conference, Shila stated that she would be collaborating with GME Music and Vie Media to expand her career in Hong Kong. She performed her two newest Chinese-language songs called "See You or Never" and "Shali De Mimi". She announced the release an extended play followed by a full album. She mentioned that she plans to learn Cantonese.

On 28 May 2015, Shila released her debut Chinese single in Hong Kong, "See You or Never" (Chinese: 再見不再見) through Shilala (HK) Limited. Liao Yu wrote the song and composed by Shila herself. This single was performed live during her international press conference. The song reached 1 million streams in just two days on Weibo Music. Shila said that this song is unique as the song hasn't an ending (the song ended with "Zaijian Bu Zaijian", questioning herself again).

On 1 October 2015, Shila performed her second Chinese single in Hong Kong, "Goodbye" (Chinese: 再見) during her Shila Amzah Meet & Greet Hong Kong acoustically with a guitar. On 6 October 2015, Shila released the single through Shilala (HK) Limited on Weibo Music and iTunes. The song was produced by Jun Kung and Kelvin Avon. The writers was inspired to write "Goodbye" after hearing Shila's previous single, which was "See You or Never". The song contains Malaysian pop and Mandopop elements and its lyrics have Shila desiring an out-of-reach love interest. Shila said that this song has an English version of it that will be launched in her upcoming album. The single is a continuation from her previous Chinese hit, "Zaijian Bu Zaijian" (再見不再見), meaning "See You or Never".

On 26 December 2015, Shila was named Metro Radio National Idol and received Metro Radio Mandarin Song of the Year for from the Metro Radio Music Awards for "Goodbye".

On 12 February 2016, Shila visited Perth for her "Shila Amzah Colorful World 2016 Live in Perth". Aus World Travel and Chinatown Cinema promoted this concert. She performed her newest Chinese song, "Xiang Ai" from her debut Chinese-language album, My Journey. On 26 February 2016, Shila was awarded "Outstanding Export Achievement Award" by the Malaysia External Trade Development Corporation (MATRADE) during the MATRADE Awards for her achievement promoting Malaysia at the international stages.

In early 2016, Deputy Prime Minister of Malaysia, Datuk Seri Ahmad Zahid Hamidi announced during the 19th Tourism Malaysia Awards that Shila was appointed as Malaysia's tourism ambassador. The Malaysian Government believes Shila could attract millions of visitors from mainland China to vacation in Malaysia. The fact that she speaks fluent Chinese will make it easier for her to deal with her music management and her Chinese fans.

On 10 March 2016, Music Asia reported that Shila has her sights set on Taiwan music market. Shila said she had produced a song with Khalil Fong to release in Taiwan. On 13 March 2016, Malaysian Chinese newspaper Sinchew Daily reported that the album was 80% done, with a planned release in April 2016. On 1 April 2016, Shila released her debut Chinese microfilm titled "Girlfriends Love" (閨蜜情緣), in which she plays the lead. On 14 April 2016, Shila released the theme song of the new series of The Powerpuff Girls (2016), "Who's Got the Power?" in Malay and Chinese exclusively on YouTube.

On 21 April 2016, Shila announced her debut Chinese album, My Journey (Chinese: 心旅) on Instagram, Twitter and Facebook simultaneously. The album was released physically and digitally on 30 April 2016 through Shilala (HK) Limited and was launched in Beijing, China. The album's supporting world tour, "Shila Amzah My Journey World Tour" was first held on 26 August 2017 in Arena of Stars, Genting Highland in Malaysia. The concert is the fifth full-fledged solo concert by Shila after the "Shila Amzah Colorful World Live in Perth" in Australia and the second full-fledged concert by her in Malaysia after the Shila Amzah Love Live in Malaysia Concert held on 13 September 2014.

=== 2017–2021: Further international stardom ===
At a press conference on 27 December 2017, in Los Angeles, US, it was announced that Shila would release a new single written by a two-time Emmy award-winning composer, Nathan Wang titled "Rising Above" in the US in conjunction of the Rose Parade in Pasadena, California. The song was recorded in English and Mandarin in Burbank, California.

On 16 April 2018, Shila released "If We Are Getting Old" (Chinese: 如果我们老了) as the lead single of her upcoming seventh overall and second debut Chinese-language studio album through Star Culture Media. It was released ahead of her solemnization ceremony with her current husband, Haris Idraki Elias. She performed the lead single live during the Global Chinese Music Chart and also during her reception wedding held in Putrajaya, Malaysia. On 10 May 2018, Shila released the second single "Love Planet" (Chinese: 涂爱星球) of her upcoming album through Star Culture Media. On 12 June 2018, Shila released the third single "My Dear" (Chinese: 我的他) of her seventh studio album through Star Culture Media. Shila herself composed it.

In 2019, Shila collaborated with Malaysian famous singer-songwriter Amylea Azizan for Malay Drama Cari Aku Di Syurga's Original Soundtrack which is Tiada Dirimu (Without You). The song receive nomination in Semi-Final Muzik-Muzik 34 (2019). In the same year, Shila Amzah once again collaborated with Amylea and Farouk Roman and became duet partner with Indonesian famous singer Judika for Malay Drama, Adellea Sofea Original Soundtrack which is Tentang Rahsia (About Secret). Tentang Rahsia also receive nominations in Semi-Final Muzik Muzik 35 (2020)

In 2020, Shila Amzah with 17 Various Artist was featured on #jangankeluar (#dontgoout) by Yonnyboii a talented young Malaysian singer-songwriter. The single means we must stay at home during the pandemic and don't go out. In August 2020, Vivo Malaysia released single KITA (Us) sang by Shila Amzah for Merdeka Campaign (August is the month of Malaysia become independent on 31 August 1957. The song came in two languages, Malay and Mandarin. In May 2021, Shila Amzah collaborated with Siti Nordiana, Mark Adam, and other Malaysian singer for Eid single titled Salam Dari Jauh (Greetings From Far) since Muslims in Malaysia had to celebrate Eid (Hari Raya) at home and cannot cross the border to gathering with the family. The song came at number 34 for trending videos on YouTube on the same week it was released.

=== 2022- Present: Comeback ===
On March 6, 2022, Shila Amzah and SOG won the highest award, Best Song, for Pelukan Angkasa at the prestigious and honourable Anugerah Juara Lagu 36 which was held at Dewan Merdeka, World Trade Centre Kuala Lumpur. She made history at the Anugerah Juara Lagu as the only artist who have joined Anugerah Juara Lagu in four categories which is Runner Up in solo (Masih Aku Cinta), Duet as a finalist with Alif Satar (Selamanya Cinta), Runner-Up as a trio with Jaclyn Victor and Ning Baizura (Beribu Sesalan) and Winner as a group with SOG (Pelukan Angkasa).

She appear in various singing competition program as a duet partner first with Suki Low (3rd Winner) of Gegar Vaganza 2022. They both singing an Indonesia hit song which is Jera by Agnes Monica. In March 27, she accompanied a new singer Danial Chuer as his duet partner in Final Big Stage 2022 which gets Danial to get the highest marks given by the judges among other contestants. Danial ended in Runner-Up positions. They both slaying Still Love You the “6 octaves song” by a Korean singer Lee Hong Ki and Yoo Hwi Seung in the Final of Big Stage which held in Putrajaya International Convention Centre.

On April 1, in less than a month she made another winning history in The Masked Singer Malaysia Season 2 as she became the champion and conquering the golden trophy at the finale of The Masked Singer Malaysia Season 2. She was hide behind the mascot called ‘Rambutan’ which is a popular fruits among Malaysian and South East Asia. She shows a variety of vocal techniques along the show which gets her the first place in the final. In the final show, the 7th judges get it right by mentioning Shila Amzah name who's hiding behind the Rambutan mascot. She will be back in The Masked Singer Malaysia Raya Edition in May.

== Awards and nominations ==
In 2013, at the 20th Malaysian Music Awards, Shila received the Anugerah Kembara (International Breakthrough Award). The special award is given to Malaysian artists who have performed internationally and introduced Malaysians song to the world. Shila Amzah was given this award after she rose to fame as the champion of Asian Wave (2012), a Chinese reality singing competition held in Shanghai.

In 2014, at the UMNO General Assembly (Perhimpunan Agung UMNO) in 2014, she received the 'Puteri UMNO Female Icon Award'.

== Honour ==
- Malaysia
  - Member of the Order of the Defender of the Realm (AMN) (2017)

== Business ventures ==
Shila set up her own company, Greyscale (SA) Sdn. Bhd., Shilala (HK) Limited and Shila Amzah Greyscale Pty Ltd., with activities generally in the entertainment scene. She is also the founder and president of her own clothing line company, Shila Amzah Boutique.

On 5 June 2016, Shila launched her clothing line and her exclusive boutique called SA by Shila Amzah Boutique located at Bangi Sentral, Selangor, Malaysia.

== Discography ==
Malaysian discography

- Terima Kasih Guru (2000)
- Sha-Hila (2005)
- Bebaskan (2009)
- 3 Suara (2011)
- Shila Amzah (2013)
- Aladdin (Malaysia Original Motion Picture Soundtrack) (2019)

International discography

- My Journey (心旅, 2016)

== Concerts ==
=== Major ===
- 2014: Shila Amzah Love Live in Shanghai, Shanghai, China
- 2014: Shila Amzah Love Live in Malaysia, Kuala Lumpur, Malaysia
- 2015: Shila Amzah Colorful Live, Hong Kong
- 2016: Shila Amzah Colorful World, Perth, Australia
- 2017: Shila Amzah My Journey Concert in Malaysia, Pahang, Malaysia
- 2018: Shila Amzah Pull the Distance, Beijing, China
- 2018: Shila Amzah Loving You, Genting Highlands, Malaysia
- 2023: Shila Amzah Journey to the Future Live Tour, Genting Highlands, Malaysia
- 2023: Shila Amzah Journey to the Future Live Tour, Singapore
- 2026: Resonance: Shila Amzah in Harmony, Kuala Lumpur, Malaysia

=== Showcase ===
- 2013: Shila Amzah Showcase, Penthouse, The Icon, Kuala Lumpur, Malaysia
- 2015: Shila Amzah Exclusive Showcase, Resorts World Sentosa, Singapore

=== As guest ===
- 2014: JJ Lin Timeline World Concert, China
- 2015: KEF x Khalil Fong Concert, Hong Kong
- 2019: Hacken Lee 20th Anniversary Concert, Genting Highlands, Malaysia

=== Collaboration ===
Malaysia

- 2012: A Journey Through Time Concert, Malaysia
- 2012: Shila Amzah Concert: Gala Amal Pamoga-Gaza, Malaysia
- 2013: Setia Super Concert, Setia Tropika Johor Bahru, Malaysia
- 2015: Iskandar Waterfront Carnival Concert, Danga Bay, Johor, Malaysia
- 2015: Gateway Klang Concert, Malaysia
- 2015: Miri City 10th Anniversary Concert, Miri, Sarawak, Malaysia
- 2015: AIA Generasi Malaysia Concert, Putra Indoor Stadium Bukit Jalil, Malaysia
- 2020: Shila Amzah x MJ Wang Jackson Tour 2020, Sydney, Australia

China

- 2014: Ci Xi Concert, China
- 2014: Guiling Wanda GuangXi All-Star Concert, China
- 2014: Eric Moo-Shila Amzah Love Hurricane Concert, China
- 2014: Asian Superstar Concert, China
- 2014: SuQian JiangSu Concert, China
- 2014: TangShang Hebei Concert, China
- 2014: Galaxy Macau Star Filled Golden Concert, Macau, China
- 2014: Nanjing MTV Real Live Concert, Nanjing, China
- 2015: Nanjing All-Star Concert, Nanjing, China
- 2015: New Silk Road of Sail Stars Passion Concert, Xining, China

Other

- 2011: Asia Star Session Concert, Kazakhstan
- 2012: Ekspresi Karya Gemilang Concert, Indonesia
- 2014: Midem Festival (Malaysian Supernova Night), Cannes, France
- 2014: Skechers Sundown Music Festival Concert, Singapore
- 2020: Shila Amzah From Home, Virtual
- 2020: Kempinski Concertini, Virtual

=== Single promos ===
Year	Single	Campaign / Promotion
2009	Hanya Kita	Clean & Clear's Malaysia Promo
2009	Tunjukkan Cintamu	Cornetto's Love Promo (with RAN)
2009	Best of Both Worlds	Disney Channel's Promo (with Miley Cyrus)
2009	Rentak Optimis	Camnilah Muzik!'s Coca-Cola Promo (with Dafi)
2009	Through My Window	TMnet Everyone Connects (also participated by Bunkface, Tomok, Akim Ahmad, Dafi dan Stacy)
2012	Ke Akhir Garisan	Sorakan Emas 1Malaysia Olimpik London
2018	Rising Above	Pasadena Rose Parade, Los Angeles, USA
2019	Dunia Baru (with Hael Husaini)	Aladdin
2020	Kita	Vivo Malaysia short film OST “Kita”

== Filmography ==
Year	Network	Channel	Type	Title	Role	Notes	Country
2012	Astro	Astro Ria	Telemovie	Patah Seribu	Bella (as a lover to Azu played by Sharnaaz Ahmad)	Female lead role	Malaysia
2014	Hunan Broadcasting System	Golden Eagle Cartoon	Kids Show	Roco Kingdom: Magic School (Season 1)	Shila Nana (茜拉娜娜)	Guest star; 8 episodes	China
2022	Astro	Astro Warna		The Masked Singer Malaysia (season 2)	Participant	Champion	Malaysia
2022	Astro	Astro Ria	Musical reality	Gegar Vaganza (Season 9)	Participant	2nd Runner-up	Malaysia
2022	Astro	Astro Warna		Sepahtu Reunion Live	Cameo	Episode: "Sayang Bukan Sekadar Wayang"	Malaysia
2022	Astro	Astro Ria	Musical reality	All Together Now Malaysia (Season 2)	Jury		Malaysia

== Videography ==
=== Music videos ===
Year	Title	Notes
2005	Kita Berdansa (Loco Loco)	
2005	Yang Teristimewa	
2008	Memori Tercipta	With Ayu Damit
2008	Hanya Kita & Bebaskan	
2009	Ada Saja	
2009	Tunjukkan Cintamu	With RAN Group
2009	Rentak Optimis	With Dafi AF
2009	Through My Window	
2009	Best of Both Worlds	With Miley Cyrus; Disney Channel's Hannah Montana Promo
2011	Beribu Sesalan	With Ning Baizura & Jaclyn Victor from 3 Suara
2011	Patah Seribu (Part I)	
2011	Patah Seribu (Part II)	
2012	Ke Akhir Garisan	Promotional single
2012	Deja Vu	Original soundtrack from Aku, Kau & Dia
2012	Aku Kau dan Dia	
2013	Masih Aku Cinta	This marks her first music video with hijab
2015	再见不再见	Released by Shila Amzah; This mark her first MV using Mandarin
2015	再見不再見	Released by Vie Media, Shila's International PR
2015	再见不再见	Released by Wav Music & Entertainment
2015	再見	Copyright: Shilala (HK) Limited; Released on 5 December 2015, 12:35 p.m. (GMT+8)
2016	Who's Got The Power? (Bahasa Melayu)	Cartoon Network's The Powerpuff Girls Promo
2016	Who's Got The Power? (Chinese)	Cartoon Network's The Powerpuff Girls Promo
2016	Selamanya Cinta feat. Alif Satar (Lyric Video)	Copyright: Shilala (HK) Limited
2016	Manusia	
2017	When I Love Me	
2019	Tiada Dirimu	
2019	Pelukan Angkasa	with SOG
2019	Tentang Rahsia	
2020	#JanganKeluar	
2020	KITA	
2020	Tentang Rahsia (Versi Orkestra)	
2020	Penyejuk Hati	
2022	Khilaf Asmara	
2022	Seikhlas Hati	with SOG
2022	Bahagiakan Dia	with Liza Hanim
2022	Jauh Hati	

=== Music covers ===
Year	Music cover	Original singer	Current views
2012	Ji De	JJ Lin	74,199
2012	Aku Yang Tersakiti	Judika	527,549
2012	Setengah Mati Rindu	Judika	32,137
2013	Cups feat. Syada Amzah	Anna Kendrick	334,999
2013	Kepadamu Kekasih feat. Syafiq Amzah	M. Nasir	77,832
2013	Mirai e	Kiroro	215,000
2013	Tetap Menantimu	Nomad	260,828
2013	Wrecking Ball	Miley Cyrus	543,129
2013	Relaku Pujuk	Spider	82,688
2015	Hello	Adele	711,266
2015	One Last Time	Ariana Grande	102,314
2015	Thinking Out Loud	Ed Sheeran	142,533
2015	Same Old Love	Selena Gomez	86,767
2015	Like I'm Gonna Lose You	Meghan Trainor feat. John Legend	115,873
2015	Stone Cold	Demi Lovato	101,499
2015	Love Yourself	Justin Bieber	688,273
2016	Sorry	Justin Bieber	155,170
2016	Janam Janam	Arijit Singh & Antara Mitra	1,967,366
2016	All I Ask	Adele	790,262
2016	Dangerous Woman (A Cappella)	Ariana Grande	196,317
2016	Bimbang	Melly Goeslaw	218,274
2016	You Are My Everything	Gummy	263,185
2016	We Don't Talk Anymore feat. Alif Satar	Charlie Puth feat. Selena Gomez	202,532
2016	Ignorance	Paramore	63,306
2016	Come Back Home	2NE1	374,647
2017	Last Dance	BIGBANG	669,704
2017	Whistle	BLACKPINK	694,201
2017	Beautiful (Goblin Original Soundtrack)	Crush	725,127
2017	It Ain't Me	Kygo, Selena Gomez	28,411
2017	Say You Won't Let Go	James Arthur	27,283
2017	Decode	Paramore	8,448
