= Patah Seribu =

Single by Shila Amzah

from the album Shila Amzah
- Released: July 20, 2012 (Digital)
- Recorded: 2011
- Genre: Pop
- Length: 3:56
- Label: Urustabil (2011); SA Entertainment (2013)
- Songwriter(s): Shila Amzah
- Producer(s): ND Lala

Shila Amzah singles chronology
"Kejar" (2009)	"Patah Seribu" (2012)	"A Moment Like This" (2013)

"Patah Seribu" is a pop song performed and recorded by Malaysian singer-songwriter Shila Amzah. The song was solely written by Shila and produced by ND Lala. It was released on July 20, 2012, by Urustabil as a promotional single on iTunes. It was later added to Shila's fifth self-titled studio album, Shila Amzah, released by Shila Amzah Entertainment Berhad on December 10, 2013.

Contemporary critics gave "Patah Seribu" average to favorable reviews. In Malaysia and Brunei Darussalam, the song achieved commercial success. It peaked at number 31 on the Malaysia iTunes Top Songs Chart and number 57 on the Brunei Darussalam iTunes Top Songs Chart.

During the 19th Malaysian Music Awards, "Patah Seribu" won Song of the Year and Pop Song of the Year from the Recording Industry of Malaysia. "Patah Seribu" has also participated in the 27th Anugerah Juara Lagu.

== Background ==
"Patah Seribu" was written by Shila Amzah and produced by her father, ND Lala. "Patah Seribu" was first released as a promotional single. The song was reissued on December 10, 2013, in her self-titled studio album, Shila Amzah.

== Charts ==
Chart (2016)	Peak position
Brunei iTunes Top Chart	57
