= 3 Suara =

Studio album by Jaclyn Victor, Ning Baizura & Shila Amzah
- Released: January 6, 2011
- Genre: Pop
- Label: Sony Music Malaysia
- Producers: Irwan Simanjuntak, Alwyn Santiago, Paul Morrison & Kevin Chan

Singles from 3 Suara
- 1. "Di Mana Di Mana"; 2. "Beribu Sesalan"; 3. "Semua Isi Hatimu"

Professional ratings
Review scores
Source	Rating
Tupai.com.my	5/5 stars

3 Suara (Malay; lit. 'Three voices') is a collaborative album by three Malaysian singers, Jaclyn Victor, Ning Baizura and Shila Amzah. The album was released on January 6, 2011 by Sony Music Malaysia.

== Background ==
The concept of the album is the sound of Malaysian pop music in the 1980s and 1990s. It is said that the inspirations for the album are local women singers from the 1980s such as Noorkumalasari, Francissca Peter, Zaiton Sameon and more.

== Track listing ==
No.	Title	Writer(s)	Length
1.	"It's a Beautiful Life"	Irwan Simanjuntak
2.	"Menari Dalam Hujan"	Kevin Chin, Tinta
3.	"Semua Isi Hatimu"	Irwan Simanjuntak
4.	"Di Mana Di Mana"	Irwan Simanjuntak
5.	"Beribu Sesalan"	Kevin Chin, Tinta
6.	"Hanya Satu"	Kevin Chin, Tinta
7.	"Mengenang Mu"	Irwan Simanjuntak
8.	"Tomorrow's Calling"	Paul Morrison
9.	"Teman"	Alwyn Santiago, Tinta
10.	"Beribu Sesalan [Acoustic]"	Kevin Chin, Tinta

== Awards ==
Year	Award	Category	Recipient	Outcome
2011	Anugerah Planet Muzik	Best Duo/Group	3 Suara	Won
2011	Anugerah Planet Muzik	Best Album	3 Suara	Nominated
2011	The 18th Anugerah Industri Muzik (AIM)	Best Group Vocal Performance in a Song for "Beribu Sesalan"	3 Suara	Won
2011	The 18th Anugerah Industri Muzik (AIM)	Best Album	3 Suara	Nominated
2011	The 18th Anugerah Industri Muzik (AIM)	Best Pop Song	"Beribu Sesalan"	Nominated
2011	The 26th Anugerah Juara Lagu (AJL)	Best Song	"Beribu Sesalan"	2nd Place

== Chart performance ==
=== Singles ===
Year	Single	Peak chart positions	
Year	Single	Era	Muzik Muzik
2011	"Beribu Sesalan"	2	1
