= Tomok =

- توموق
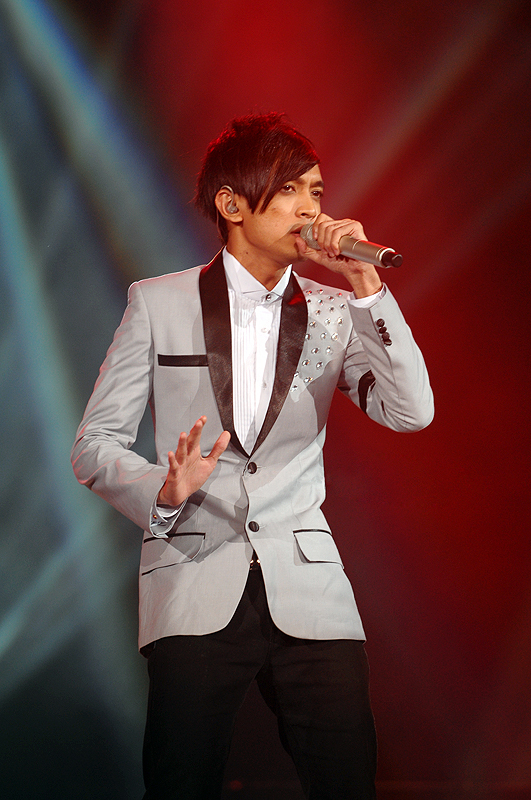
- Tomok during the Anugerah Juara Lagu 24 rehearsal
- Born: Shah Indrawan bin Ismail; 17 May 1984 (age 42); Negeri Sembilan, Malaysia
- Occupations: Singer, actor, songwriters
- Spouse: Rahayu Abas (m. 2011)
- Children: 3
- Musical career
- Genres: Pop rock, ballad
- Instrument: Guitar
- Years active: 1997–present
- Label: Monkey Bone
- Member of: New Boyz

Shah Indrawan bin Ismail (born 17 May 1984), known as Tomok, is a Malaysian singer and the winner of the third season of One in a Million (OIAM), a reality TV singing competition. He became the first male contestant and the first recording artist to do so in the history of the competition. He is also the founder, leader and lead vocalist of a Malaysian band called New Boyz.

== Early life ==
Tomok was born in Negeri Sembilan on 17 May 1984 and was raised in Kuala Lumpur. He is the fourth child of six. His older sister, Ismaliza Ismail (Isma) is also a singer and participated in Akademi Fantasia (season 7). He started singing at the age of 8 and was inspired by his favourite group, Exist, after he went to see their concert in 1992. Tomok also named Tan P. Ramlee as his idol. His nickname "Tomok" was given to him by his childhood friends as he was known to be the chubby kid in the neighbourhood. Tomok is derived from the two Bahasa Malaysia words tamak, meaning "glutton", and gemok, meaning "fat", thus Tomok.

== Pre-One in a Million ==
When he was 13-years-old he was enrolled as the lead singer of a band called New Boyz since 1997. He gained instant fame with the band. However their popularity waned as the years went by. Tomok recorded six albums together with New Boyz between 1999 and 2008. While with New Boyz, Tomok was often criticised by the public for singing with a nasal voice (suara sengau). In one of the OIAM episodes, Tomok mentioned that the band was pelted with stones during some of their live performances.

== One in a Million ==
=== Audition ===
In December 2008, Tomok signed-up for the audition of the third season of a reality TV singing competition called One in a Million organised by local TV station, 8TV. As the show has a reputation of selecting only the best talent and voice around the nation, many predicted that Tomok wouldn't advance far in the competition.

Tomok went into the audition with his guitar and a new image, but one of the judges, i.e.; Paul Moss commented that his new image is like "a busker in the LRT station". During the audition Tomok was asked by Syafinaz on what is to become of New Boyz. Tomok explained that the band is still around and he would still be with the band. His bandmates actually encouraged and supported him to try out for the show. Even though both judges weren't too impressed with Tomok during the audition, he was given a pass through to the next round because both judges think that he has the talent and potential.

"Look, you definitely have the talent to do something. I think you got to figure out exactly what that something is gonna be. It's not gonna be what you were before with New Boyz, but I don't think is gonna be that busking with a guitar." – Paul Moss

After the audition, one of the show's hosts, Awal Ashaari congratulated him for advancing to the next round and thanked him for participating in the competition. Awal also wished that through OIAM, Tomok would be able to portray a different image from what he was previously known.

=== Central elimination round ===
In the Top 80, Tomok sang Jeritan Batin Ku for the blind test and passed. In the Top 60 elimination round, which was the group singing round, he, Farmy, Nine, Sam, Affan, and Zack were assigned to sing M. Nasir's song, Juwita (Citra Terindah). For the Top 40 elimination, which was a duet, Tomok chose Nor Rasfan as his duet partner and they sang Mentera Semerah Padi (M. Nasir). While he made it to the next round, his duet partner didn't.

During the final elimination round, i.e.; Top 20, Tomok sang Carefree's Belaian Jiwa. Syafinaz commented that the direction of which Tomok had shown during the course of the elimination round was rather confusing. After Paul Moss delivered the judges' decision, it took a while for Tomok to realise that he was chosen to be in the Top 12.

"Syafinaz and myself have had long discussions about what we think you're doing wrong and what we think you're doing occasionally right. But our expectations are very high and we expect to see those expectations delivered in the Top 12, because you're both making it through."- Paul Moss

=== Top 12 ===
Tomok kicked off his campaign in the OIAM3 Top 12 by singing Faizal Tahir's Coba. After the performance, both judges urged Tomok to prove that he deserves to be in the competition. However, Paul Moss also commented that the dramatic knee drop that he did for the performance was vomit worthy. After he was criticised for not making the right song choice for the Top 11 show, Tomok made his breakthrough performance in the Top 10 Week with his rendition of Beyoncé's Crazy in Love. For the Songwriter's Week (Top 9), Tomok brilliantly executed the challenge that was set out for the week and delivered Meet Uncle Hussein's La La La Kerjalah with his own style and musical arrangement. As he has cleverly changed the song to suit his style, he was granted Immunity for that performance.

After a disappointing performance in the Top 8, Tomok chose to perform Ingin Bersamamu, Syafinaz's hit song in the following week. It was regarded as a risky move, but it bore fruit when he was granted his second Immunity. Syafinaz even branded him as musically smart. However, the guest judge, Francesca Peter didn't fancy his version of the song. Tomok once again captivated the audience with his version of Rihanna's Umbrella in the Top 6. Paul Moss predicted that Tomok would be one of the finalists for the Grand Finals. In the Top 6 episode, as a response to one of Marion's question, Tomok revealed that he had tried a solo act before, but he couldn't manage to gain the public's trust in his credibility. He believes that OIAM is the perfect platform to display his talent and show that he can perform a solo act.

For the Dato' Sheila Majid themed week, he performed Aku Cinta Padamu and Syafinaz remarked that if Immunity were still up for grabs, Tomok would be the rightful winner of it for the week. Paul Moss called it a class act. Tomok paid tribute to one of Malaysia's greatest bands, Alleycats in the Top 4-week by singing a medley of the group's songs. He cited that the in Concert theme posed the biggest challenge for him throughout the competition as he has to find the right song for the week's performance. In the Top 3 performance for Coba, he donned spectacles and strummed his guitar for the first and only time in the competition. He attributed his lack of playing guitar on stage to one of Paul's comments during the audition. In the episode, Tomok mentioned that he felt that OIAM had managed to unearth his talent and make him feel like being again in the music industry.

On 1 May 2009, at the Grand Finals of OIAM 3, Tomok emerged as the winner of the show by gaining 39.3% of the SMS votes, followed by Esther with 33.29% and Aweera, 27.41%. He became the first male contestant and the first recording artist to do so in the history of the competition. Earlier that night, Tomok was announced as the contestant having the fewest votes amongst the three and was up for elimination. Fortunately, he was saved from elimination as a result of a week-long opinion poll set up by 8TV in which fans chose all three to compete rather than only two of them. In the Grand Finals, Tomok performed a cover of Aizat's Hanya Kau Yang Mampu and a new song, Rindu Terhenti (composed by Aubrey Suwito, lyrics by Tinta S). Paul Moss called it a class performance and Syafinaz regarded it as the best performance of the night. The win was viewed by many as a triumphant comeback for Tomok in the music industry. His involvement in OIAM has managed to shed his previous image and transformed him to a better singer and performer. The public opinion of him has also changed since then.

=== Judges' quotes ===
"When people came up to see me, the question they would ask about OIAM this season is, 'Can Tomok really sing?' Let me be frank. I'm not a fan of yours. But then, when I heard you sing during the audition, your voice has matured and the nasal voice of which I don't like has gone. So, I feel that it's a pressure for you, but please prove to them that you have the right to be on that stage and prove them wrong. "- Syafinaz

"You are smarter than you look aren't you?" Paul Moss to Tomok after La La La Kerjalah performance

"The last couple of week you actually really impressed us. You had drama in your performances, energy, fun. Tonight you took away the drama, energy and fun and it was nothing left. It was just to me, it came over really boring. As I said, he has set the bar really high. We expect him to surprise us and amaze us and he didn't." – Paul Moss comments for Gantung

"Tomok, once again you brought fun and pleasure not only to me but to everyone here in the studio. Tonight was the best voice control you've had ever since you were here, but be careful with your pronunciation." – Syafinaz for Tomok's Umbrella Performance

"You've established yourself as operating already on the next level. I think you actually a level above most in this competition. Tonight was really no different. You're a real class act dude and I didn't see it coming. Keep it up. Not a lot of people could really transform what I think is a feely boring song. And you transformed it to something that I really enjoyed. So, well done." – Paul Moss on Tomok's Aku Cinta Padamu rendition

"I think that was a fantastic performance. When you came out, I can see that look in your eyes, you are ready to perform, your features and gestures are so selective, you pick the right gestures, you know how to use the stage and how to excite the audience. You've nailed it. Congratulations"- Dato' Sheila Majid on Tomok's Aku Cinta Padamu rendition

"It was a very classy performance and you've just growing week after week. I am genuinely surprised at the progress that you've made. Nice. Classy." – Paul Moss on Rindu Terhenti

"A compliment for you. To me, you how to control the stage and the audience. Overall, I'm not being biased, but this is the best performance tonight." – Syafinaz on Rindu Terhenti

=== Performances and result ===
Week #	Theme	Song choice	Original artist	Order #	Result
Top 80	N/A	Jeritan Batin Ku	P. Ramlee	N/A	Advanced
Top 60	NA	Juwita (Citra Terindah)	M. Nasir	NA	Advanced
Top 40	NA	Mentera Semerah Padi	M. Nasir	NA	Advanced
Top 20	NA	Belaian Jiwa	Carefree	NA	Advanced
Top 12	Contestant's Choice	Coba	Faizal Tahir	10	Safe
Top 11	Memori Tercipta	Rahsia Pohon Cemara	Exist	8	Safe
Top 10	Contestant's Choice	Crazy in Love	Beyoncé	10	Safe
Top 9	Songwriter's Week	La La La Kerjalah	Meet Uncle Hussein	5	Safe (Immunity Winner)
Top 8	Opposites Attract	Gantung	Melly Goeslaw	1	Safe
Top 7	Contestant's Choice	Ingin Bersamamu	Syafinaz	7	Safe (Immunity Winner)
Top 6	Contestant's Choice	Umbrella	Rihanna	1	Safe
Top 5	Sheila Majid's Song	Aku Cinta Padamu	Sheila Majid	5	Safe
Top 4	In Concert	Alleycats' Medley; Jika Kau Bercinta Lagi; Sekuntum Mawar Merah; Kerana Kau	Alleycats	2	Safe
Top 3	Judge's Choice; Viewer's Choice	Crazy in Love; Coba	Beyoncé; Faizal Tahir	1; 3	Safe
Grand Finals	Contestant's Choice; New Song	Hanya Kau Yang Mampu; Rindu Terhenti	Aizat; Shah Indrawan	3; 6	Winner

== Post One in a Million ==
For winning the competition, Tomok bagged RM 1 million in terms of cash and record deal. His debut solo album is to be produced by 8TV record label Monkey Bone. Regarding the use of his pet name, Tomok, he is still happy to be known by his pet name but he would like to be credited as Shah Indrawan in his debut album. As for New Boyz, Tomok reiterated many times that he'd still be with the band as the band has been one part of his life. He also has special project in mind with the band.

== Personal life ==
On 1 July 2011, Tomok 27 years old and Rahayu Abas, 32 years old married on Friday night 9.30pm at Dewan Serbaguna AU2 Taman Keramat, Kuala Lumpur.

Tomok and his wife, Rahayu Abas, are blessed with 3 children (Arrian Shah Akid (born in 2013), Andra Shah Iman (born in 2015) and Siti Khadijah (born in 2020).

Tomok pursued a bachelor's degree in Creative Industries Management at Universiti Utara Malaysia (UUM) campus in Kuala Lumpur. He graduated in 2023 with first class honour.

== Discography ==
=== Studio album ===
- Tomok (2010)
- Aku Datang (2014)

=== Singles ===
- "Rindu Terhenti" (Aubrey Suwito & Tinta S)
- "Berlari" (Shazee & Tomok)
- "Arjuna" (Edry KRU)
- "Bagaikan Bidadari" (Aubrey Suwito & Tomok)
- "Aku Datang" (Tomok & Rafidah)
- "Biarkan Sejoli" (OST Sejoli) (Nurzaidi Abd Rahman)
- "Tak Harus Memiliki" (OST Isyarat Cinta) (Faz Alberto)
- "Cinta Tak Pergi" ft. Yana Samsudin (Tomok)
- "Rempuh" ft. Black (OST J Revolusi) (Omar K, Ezra Kong & John Jeevasingham/Hael & Zel)
- "Senyuman Manismu" (OST Miss Kapten Cikgu Waiz) (Tomok & Papompo)
- "Fenomena" (OST TQ Captain) (Tomok)
- "Demi Cinta Ini" ft. Fatin Afeefa (OST Shakira) (Tomok)
- "Tumpang Lalu Bang" ft. Kila Fairy (OST Tumpang Lalu Bang) (Tomok & Rudy Nastia)
- "Sudah Tak Cinta" (Cover) (Ayu Rizki Yani)
- "Mandrem" (Khaleel, Rudy Nastia, Shah Indrawan)
- "CYBERCINTA" - with Modread (Fami Ikhwan)
- "Limitasi" - ft. Ariz (OST Malbatt: Misi Bakara) (Ariz / Ariz, Zikri Zakaria, Nana Sheme)
- "Kasih Yang Ku Cinta" (Tomok)
- "Bermalam Tanpa Bintang" - (OST Sayu Yang Bersyukur) (Mohd Atlas)
- “Memori Mungkin Berulang” (2024) with Siti Nordiana (Siti Nordiana & Tomok)
- “Larut” - (OST Aku Bukan Ustazah 2)(A.R.T, FAI, Amylea)
- “Gelisah Jiwa Meronta Asmara” (2025) with Siti Nordiana ( Sang Hitam, Didy, Ismet, Siti Nordiana & Tomok)

== Filmography ==
=== Film ===
Year	Title	Role	Notes
2004	Makar	Ali	Cameo
2012	Mantera The Movie	Azman	
2012	Istanbul Aku Datang!	Azad	
2018	Konsert Hora Horey Didi & Friends	Uncle Tomok	Voice

=== Television series ===
Year	Title	Role	TV channel	Notes
2004	Sembilu	Shahril	TV3	Cameo
2004	Cinta Apa Di Pagi Raya		TV2	
2008	Lodeh		TV2	
2013	Lemang Sebatang		Astro Prima	
2014	Suamiku Jururawat Isteriku Doktor	Mikail	TV3	
2020	TQ Captain	Amsyar	Astro Ria	
2022	Tumpang Lalu Bang	Nizam	TV9	

=== Telemovie ===
Year	Title	Role	TV channel
2002	New Boyz The Telemovie	Himself	—
2002	Pulau Inspirasi	Himself	—
2003	Meraung	Himself	—
2011	Cer Citer Cinta	Komot	Astro Ria
2013	Suamiku Jururawat	Mikael / Toyol	TV3
2013	Mentolku	Amran / Mentol	TV3
2013	Diari Kampus Biru	Zakhrul	TVi
2014	Cupcake Mama	Adam	Astro Ria
2014	20 Sen		TV9
2018	Malam Ini Aku Menangis	Khairil	Astro Ria
2019	Geng Van Jenazah	Husin	TV3
