= One in a Million (Malaysian TV series) =

- Directed by: Sunil Kumar (Season 1); Michael Christian Simon (Season 1)
- Presented by: Awal Ashaari (seasons 1–3); Marion Caunter (seasons 1–3); Haniff Hamzah (season 4); Fiza Frizzy (season 4)
- Judges: Syafinaz Selamat (seasons 1–3); Paul Moss (seasons 1–3); Ziana Zain (season 4); Yusry Abd Halim (season 4)
- Opening theme: "Star" by Jaclyn Victor
- Country of origin: Malaysia
- No. of seasons: 3 (original series); 1 (revival series)
- No. of episodes: 37 (original series); 8 (revival series); Total: 45

Production
- Executive producers: Sunil Kumar (Season 1 & 3); Mas Ayu Hj. Ali (Season 2)
- Production locations: Sri Pentas 2, Shah Alam; Putra World Trade Centre, Kuala Lumpur
- Running time: 90–110 minutes

Original release
- Network: 8TV
- Release: 26 May 2006 – 1 May 2009
- Network: TV3
- Release: 22 December 2024 – 9 February 2025

One in a Million (often abbreviated OIAM, also known as Calpis Soda One in a Million for season 4) is a Malaysian reality-competition show. It is the first reality singing competition to offer a RM 1 million prize to the winner. The show began airing on 8TV, a terrestrial television network in Malaysia, on 26 May 2006.

One in a Million seeks to discover the best young singer in the country through several auditions held nationwide. The objective of awarding a large amount of prize money is to provide the winner with quality production and marketing resources. In the later stages of the competition, the progress of the contestants is determined by public voting by phone or text messaging. This is also the first reality singing competition that allows viewers to vote in as well as vote out the contestants.

The show features two judges who critique the contestants' performances to facilitate voting: former singer and music lecturer Syafinaz Selamat and brand manager for 8TV, Paul Moss. The show is hosted by Awal Ashaari and Marion Caunter.

Though the original run ended in 2009 after 3 seasons, a revival series was green-lit in 2024 and known as Calpis Soda One in a Million following a sponsorship from Calpis Soda. The series' fourth season, the first season in 15 years, began premiered on TV3 from 22 December 2024 to 9 February 2025.

== Regulations ==
One in a Million is open to all Malaysian residents aged 16 to 32 during the taping of the program. A unique feature of the show is that recording artists, established or otherwise, can take part in this contest, as displayed by popular singers Dayang Nurfaizah and Siti Sarah Raisuddin.

To be eligible, contestants must not be permanent and/or contract employees of the television station 8TV or its sister stations under Media Prima Berhad. Contestants must also not be representatives, employees, servants and/or agents of advertising or promotion service providers of 8TV and their immediate family member.

== Format ==
=== Auditions ===
The producers of the show hold open public auditions at locations across the country, where anyone who is eligible can attend. Hopefuls audition before the judges at several venues across the country.

A selection of the auditions in front of the judges – usually the best, the worst and the most bizarre – are broadcast over the first few weeks of the show. Each contestant enters the audition room, often after waiting for hours, and delivers either an a cappella or accompanied by their own guitar or keyboard instrument. If at least one of the two judges say "yes", then the contestant goes through to the next filter; otherwise, the contestant is sent home. Filtering the audition hopefuls before the next round varies by season.

=== Central elimination and knock-out ===
Contestants who passed the auditions are split into groups in the central elimination. Contestants are asked to perform in front of the judges again and are narrowed down to forty.

The top 40 contestants are put through blind and style/presentation tests. In the 'blind test', the contestants had to perform behind a screen. In the 'style/presentation' round, two guest judges judge the style and presentation of each contestant.

The 20 contestants who move forward are ranked according to their performances. The contestants ranked in the top 10 must then pick an opposing contestant from the Bottom 10 to compete against. Out of these 10 pairs, only one contestant from each pair may move on, as decided by the judges.

=== Finals ===
The finals last ten weeks during which each of the final 12 contestants perform one song each week. The format changes, with contestants singing two songs each week when there are only four contestants remaining. After each contestant has performed, the judges comment on their performance, usually focusing on vocal ability and stage presence. Once all the contestants have appeared, the voting lines open at the end of the show and the viewers vote to keep singers on the show or off. From this point on, the judges serve almost entirely in an advisory capacity, with no direct influence on the results.

The results are only announced a week later on the following episode before the performances.

The winner receives a RM1 million record deal with the record label Monkey Bone and will be managed by a management unit called he 8 Unit.

== Judges and hosts ==
=== Judges ===
- Syafinaz Selamat
- Paul Moss

=== Hosts ===
==== Awal Ashaari ====
Ashaari has hosted several TV programs and has appeared in several drama series and movies. Prior to hosting One in a Million, Ashaari had made it to the top 30 on the first season of Malaysian Idol.

== Season summary ==
Season	Winner	Runner-up	Other Contestant (In Order Of Elimination)	Number Of Contestants
Season 1	Suki Low Sook Yee (Suki)	Faizal Tahir (Faizal)	Alif Satar (Alif); Dayang Nurfaizah (Dayang); Farah Asyikin Zulkifli (Farah); Alif Azfar Ishak (Azfar); Mohd Lokman Aslam Abdul Mutalip (Lokman); Zaihanee Zainal Abidin (Zai); Nur Hasliah Abbu Hassan (Datin Alyah); Shahmeen Shah Halim Shah (Ameen); Norshammeme Arzeyana Shamsuddin (Mimi); Anny Johanna Mohammad Shariff (Anny)	12
Season 2	Norayu Damit (Ayu)	Shila Amzah (Shila)	Siti Sarah Raisuddin (Sarah); Abraham Edwin (Ab); Mark Glenn Malim (Mark); Shone Eric Jr. Majimbun (Shone); Joni Tham Chi Won (Joni); Ungku Intan Sarafina Ungku Yahya (Intan); Khairullah Ezuan Sulaini (Iz); Tunku Tiara Yasmin Sofia (Tiara); Shahron Hussein (Rony); Nor Azrinna Azahar (Rina)	12
Season 3	Shah Indrawan Ismail (Tomok)	Elizabeth Applunius Chin (Esther)	Nasharul Aweera Bin Norhissham (Weera); Zulqarnain Bin Jaafar (Nine); Amylea Binti Azizan (Amy); Simon Christopher (Simon); Muhammad Ridzuan Bin Sharifuddin (Rizu); Fify Emielia Shazlin Binti Ahmad Murshaidi (Fify); Anith Aquilah Binti Sulaiman Lim (Anith); Norafizah Binti Mohamad Yasin (Pija); Rehana Binti Mohd Yunus (Han); Nur Hidayu Binti Md Tekhary (Ayu)	12

== Seasons ==
- Season 1 (2006)
- Season 2 (2007–08)
- Season 3 (2008–09)
- Season 4 (2024–25)

== One in a Million Diary ==
A spin-off titled One in a Million Diary debuted after the Top 8 show during the first season. It aired on Wednesdays at 9.30p.m. and featured off-stage video clips as well as exclusive weekly interviews with the contestants.

== See also ==
- Malaysian Idol
