= Farah Asyikin =

Farah Asyikin فرح عاشقين
- Born: Farah Asyikin binti Zulkifli; 11 November 1979 (age 46)
- Origin: Kuala Lumpur Malaysia
- Genres: Pop; R&B; Pop rock
- Years active: 1999-2000 2006-2012 2018-now
- Labels: Nature Records (2006-2009), Monkey Bone (2007-2009)
- Website: www.farah-asyikin.com (coming soon), www.farahasyikin.net

Farah Asyikin binti Zulkifli (born 11 November 1979) is a Malaysian singer and songwriter, who placed third on the second season of Malaysian Idol and fifth on the first season of its replacement show One in a Million. Her self-titled debut album has just been released recently, featuring the hit singles such as Dari Sini Ke Bintang-Bintang and Get Happy.

== One in a Million ==
Throughout the entire competition, Farah sang:

- Pupus – Dewa19 (Top 20)
- Baby One More Time – Britney Spears (Top 12)
- Total Eclipse of the Heart – Bonnie Tyler (Top 10)
- Bilang Saja – Agnes Monica (Top 9)
- Time After Time- Cyndi Lauper (Top 8)
- Anytime You Need a Friend – Mariah Carey (Top 7)
- Takkan Ada Cinta Yang Lain - Dewa (Top 6)
- Tak Tercapai Akalmu - Elyana (Top 6)
- Trees - Marty Casey & The Lovehammers (Top 5)
- Unfaithful – Rihanna (Top 5)
- Superwoman - Karyn White (After elimination on Top 4 week)

== Discography ==
1999-2000

- Kembali Lagi Disisimu
- Lamunan Hati

2007 (album Farah Asyikin)

- Hello
- Dari Sini Ke Bintang-Bintang
- Di Pangkuan Pilu
- 1000 Penipuan
- Get Happy
- Bayangkanlah
- Sempurna
- Fantasi

2008-10

- Tak Ingin Akhiri
- Aku Ada Kamu ft Along Ezendy (OST Belukar)
- Kamu Aku Satu ft Shamrin Fotograf
- Adamu
- Penjagaku

2014

- What's Going On
- Redhamu
- I'm Without You Allah

== Cover Song ==
*Fame - Irene Cara

*Since U Been Gone -Kelly Clarkson

*Breakaway - Kelly Clarkson

== See also ==
- One in a Million (Malaysian TV series)
- Faizal Tahir
- Suki Low
- Alif Satar
