= Syafinaz Selamat =

Yang Berbahagia Datuk Syafinaz Selamat PMW
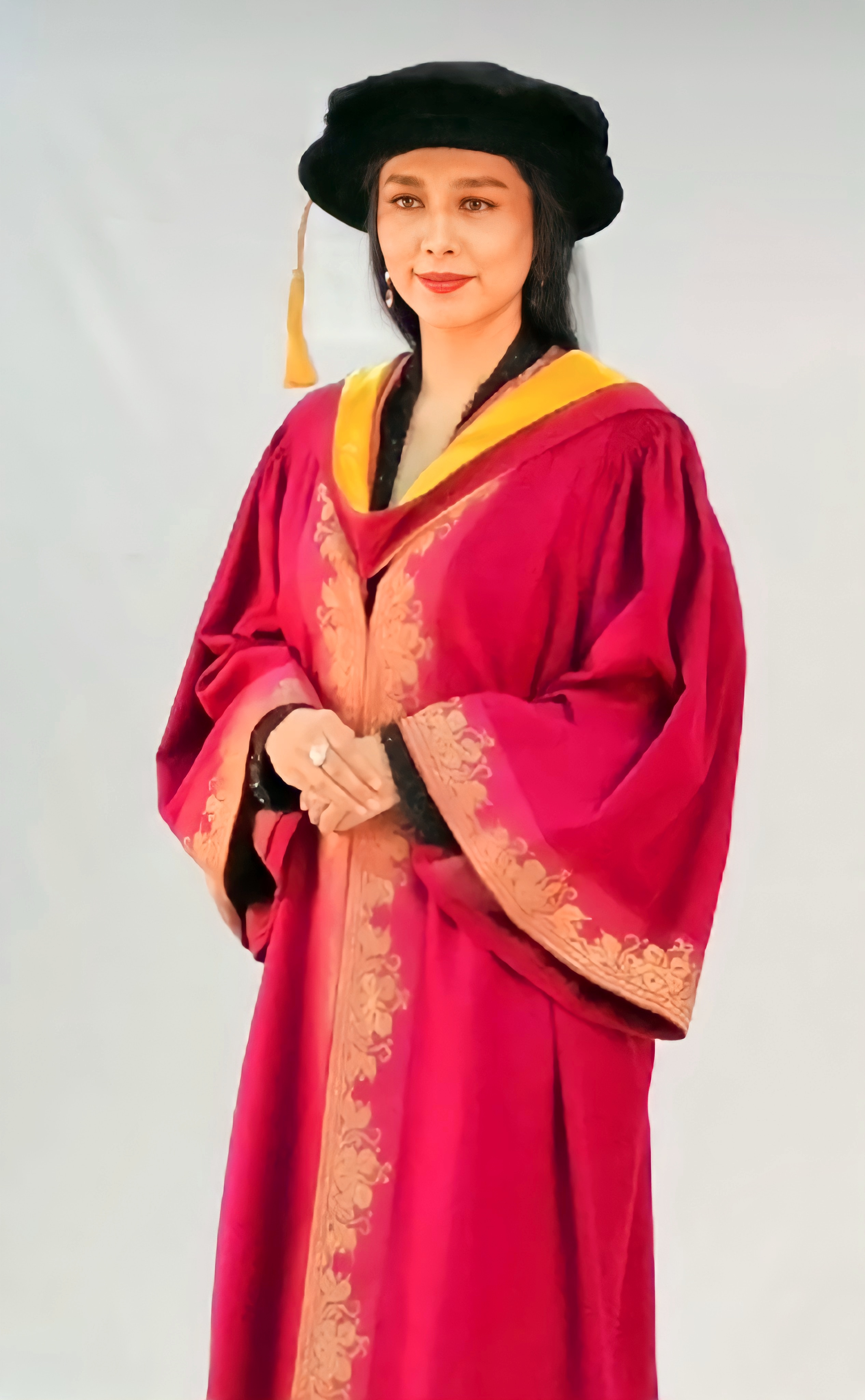
- Born: 11 January 1973 (age 53); Pontian, Johor Darul Ta'zim, Malaysia
- Education: Bachelor of Music
- Alma mater: Universiti Teknologi MARA Shah Alam
- Occupations: Singer; Voice teacher; Vocal coach; Choir Conductor; University lecturer; Record producer; Music director
- Years active: 1989–present
- Height: 165 cm (5 ft 5 in)
- Parents: Selamat Salwi; Zaiton Hassan
- Relatives: Tunku Tiara Yasmin Sofia (niece); Lily Jannah (niece)
- Musical career
- Genres: Pop; R&B; Classical music; Bossa nova; Jazz; Ballad
- Instruments: Vocal; Piano
- Labels: P&C (1989, 1999, 2001); Antarctic Sound Production Sdn Bhd (1989); EMI (Malaysia) Sdn Bhd (1999); Syafinaz Selamat Sdn Bhd (2008–present): M.O.B; Dennis Lau; Frank Scott Hew; Paul Moss; Aubrey Suwito
- Website: instagram.com/datuksyafinazofficial

Signature
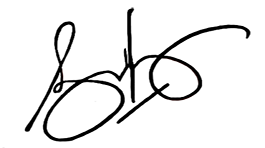

Syafinaz binti Selamat; (Jawi: شافيناز بنت سلامت; born 11 January 1973), (Note: Syafinaz shares the same birthday as another Malaysian singer, Siti Nurhaliza.) is a Malaysian singer who sings in Malay, English, Italian, Spanish, and German. She is a soprano soloist; known as a voice teacher, vocal coach and a lecturer in universities and private classes; a leading voice master in adult and children choir groups; and regarded as a connoisseur of voice art who's often invited as a professional jury or critic in local singing competitions and reality programmes.

== Early life ==
Syafinaz Selamat is the youngest child out of 11 siblings, and was born in the Pontian District of Johor in Malaysia. Syafinaz began her singing journey as a child singer at the age of 7 in events around her hometown in the Batu Pahat District.

At the age of 9, Syafinaz was recommended to join a talent search produced by Radio Televisyen Malaysia (RTM) by her sister who worked there. Syafinaz soon became a regular singer alongside her duet partner Eliza in RTM radio segments, and RTM national television's children's programme that was aired during festive seasons.

Syafinaz landed her first record deal at the age of 15, and her first album titled after her own name, Syafinaz was launched in 1989.

== Artistry ==
Aside of beginning her singing journey at the age of 7, Syafinaz also enrolled in the electric organ lesson and the piano lesson respectively at the age of 7 and 10. Syafinaz then continued her music education in the Universiti Teknologi MARA (UiTM) and graduated with a Bachelor's degree in Music. She is also a classically trained singer under the tutelage of Siti Chairani Proehoeman (voice), Muzaffar Abdullah (piano), as well as veterans in the Malaysian music education and classical performance scene. Syafinaz also took initiative by completing a short course in Germany with Heidrun Maria Hahn, a German opera singer, before taking on a commitment as an opera singer.

Syafinaz's operatic soprano voice fach is dramatic coloratura soprano (Note: As opposed to lyrical coloratura soprano voice that is agile light with bright full timbre, dramatic coloratura soprano is powerful through the emotive voice with a darker timbre. However, both lyrical and dramatic coloratura soprano voices specialize in music that is distinguished by agile runs, leaps and trills.) and ranges from D3 to F6, making her suited for repertoire and arias from composers such as Mozart, Puccini, Bellini, Delibes and Verdi. She was chosen to play the role of the soprano solo in Carl Orff's opera Carmina Burana with 100 choir members and the National Symphony Orchestra of Malaysia, conducted by Roland Peelman.

== Career ==
=== Singer ===
Syafinaz officially started off as a child singer with RTM when she was only 9 years old alongside a duet partner, Eliza. Syafinaz continued her singing journey by going solo at the age of 15 and produced her first album, Syafinaz launched in 1989. She then kickstarted her singing career as a pop singer by releasing Ingin Bersamamu album in 1999, followed by Syyh in 2001. Her career achievements as a pop singer include a Gold Medal in the R&B/Pop/Rock/Contemporary category during the 1999 World Championships of Performing Arts (WCOPA) in Los Angeles. Additionally, she's been nominated twice in Anugerah Industri Muzik (AIM) for Best Female Vocal for her albums Ingin Bersamamu (1999) and Syyh (2001), a nomination in Anugerah Bintang Popular Berita Harian for Popular Female Singer in the year 1998/99, Sri Angkasa Award and Anugerah ERA 2002.

Nowadays, Syafinaz is better known for her lyrical soprano singing in classical numbers. Between 2001 and 2020, Syafinaz collaborated in producing two featured singles respectively with Dennis Lau entitled "Mahkota" (Crown) in 2009, and Frank Scott Hew entitled "Terpesona" (Enchantment) in 2010. She also released a Raya single featuring her former protégés from Mentor 7 (Ranisha and Lazarul) entitled "RahmatNya" (His/God's Grace) in 2019. In 2021, Syafinaz released a new single entitled "Persis Salju" (Like the Snow), which is a ballad song infused with classical elements. Before its official release, "Persis Salju" had been recorded ten years earlier. The song's release was ultimately postponed due to Syafinaz's hectic daily schedule. The Covid-19 pandemic led Syafinaz to extend the release date of "Persis Salju" to the following year from its original target of 2020. In 2023, Syafinaz once again collaborated with violinist Dennis Lau in producing a song entitled "Glory". "Glory" was composed by Dennis Lau, while Tessh R.S., also known as Tinta, wrote the lyrics. Tinta also wrote the lyrics to Syafinaz's hit song "Ingin Bersamamu". On 29 July 2023, a month after "Glory" was recorded, Tinta passed away. Although Syafinaz and Dennis were devastated by this loss, they worked on "Glory" until it was completed, and released on 15 December 2023. "Glory" features themes of patriotism and community harmony.

=== Teaching ===
During her final year as a student in the Universiti Teknologi MARA (UiTM), Syafinaz was trusted with the responsibility as a lecturer assistant by Siti Chairani Prohoeman. She was then immediately recruited as a lecturer in the UiTM right after her graduation in 1995. Today, Syafinaz does not only lecture in UiTM, but also in The National Arts Academy (ASWARA) as well. In addition, Syafinaz was elected as one of the board of director at ASWARA in 2020. She is also an advisor, vocal master, director, and a conductor for the National Choir of Malaysia, and Genius Seni Koir Group (formerly known as Permata Seni Koir). Under the leadership of Syafinaz and the other teaching staffs of JKKN, the National Choir of Malaysia have won two gold medals for Vocal Group category and Mix Choir category in the 4th Bali International Choir Festival 2015; and additionally, the Genius Seni Koir group also earned a silver medal for the Pop Ensembles category and a gold medal for the Folklore with Accompaniment category in World Choir Games that was held in Gangneung, South Korea in July 2023. Syafinaz was also invited to conduct the Vienna Boys' Choir during the group's tour in Malaysia in 2011.

Moreover, Syafinaz also provides private voice tutoring and known to have tutored several well known local singers including Misha Omar, Khai Bahar, Ernie Zakri, Hael Husaini, and many more.

She was the music advisor for the reality programme Audition II, and a vocal coach in Malaysia national singing competition Bintang RTM 2018. She was also chosen as one of the mentors in the reality show Mentor for the show's 7th season installation, Mentor 7 2018. In Mentor 7, Syafinaz was the only mentor who managed to keep both of her protégés (Lazarul and Ranisha) up to the semi-final until Lazarul was eliminated in the semi-final. Syafinaz also managed to maintain the youngest and only female protégé (Ranisha, 18) from the beginning towards the final of Mentor 7.

=== Jury/critic ===
Syafinaz has extensive experience as a jury in numerous local singing competitions and reality shows, including Akademi Fantasia Season 3 (guest) and 4 (guest); Who Will Win, Mentor, One in a Million (OiAM) Season 1, 2 and 3; Pop Krew, The Band, Bintang Kecil RTM, Bintang RTM, AF Megastar 2017, Separuh Akhir Muzik-Muzik (SFMM36), Gegar Vaganza Season 6 (guest), 7 (guest), 8 (fixed), 9 (fixed) and 10 (fixed). Syafinaz was also the Captain of a team of 50 celebrity jurors for Astro's second season of All Together Now Malaysia 2022. Her partnership with her co-jury, Paul Moss in OiAM landed them a nomination for Best On-Screen Chemistry Award in Shout! Awards in 2009. What makes Syafinaz one of Malaysia's celebrated jury and critics in local singing competitions are her motivating encouragements, constructive remarks and pointers from the academic point of views.

== Special events and appearances ==
Due to her reputation as the region's leading soprano, Syafinaz is often invited as a special celebrity guest to do classical performances in local and international prestigious events, including private functions, fashion shows and product launches. Some of her international shows include the closing ceremony of the 2007 meeting of the World Economic Forum in Davos, a special appearance in Expo 2008 in Zaragoza, the 2009 Southeast Asian Games in Vientiane, the 2010 Islamic Fashion Week in Monte Carlo performing before Prince Albert, the 2011 World Islamic Economic Forum in Kazakhstan, and in the Malaysia Day Expo 2020 in Dubai. Syafinaz also made a performance alongside Rosnan Rahman, Zainal Abidin and Jaclyn Victor during Barack Obama's official visitation to Malaysia during his US presidency in 2014.

== Personal life ==
=== Family ===
Syafinaz's late father has always been supportive of her ever since she embarked on her singing journey, but he also wanted Syafinaz to have a secure future with government job guarantees. So he asked Syafinaz to further study in medical education after she obtained excellent SPM examination results, and a scholarship to do English as a Second Language (ESL). However, Syafinaz was very determined to pursue music as a career; therefore, vehemently rejected her late father's plannings for her. This disagreement has caused a great dispute between them and made Syafinaz run off to one of her sisters in Johor Bahru. After that, she decided to move to Kuala Lumpur to live with her other sister and further study in music at the UiTM. She performed consistently well throughout her studies which not only earned her Dean's List awards and a bachelor's degree in music, but also the approval and blessing of her late father who later became her even bigger supporter.

=== Relationships ===
Despite being in the entertainment industry for decades, there have been rarely any controversial tabloids relating to Syafinaz surfaced on the media gossip. Syafinaz said that her focus and daily busyness on work commitment was the main reason she found it difficult to socialize freely, therefore rarely becoming the target of media gossip. In addition to that, Syafinaz admitted to still being single.

=== Fierce reputation ===
Syafinaz has a reputation for being a fierce (Note: Definition of Fierce (adjective) – violently hostile or aggressive in temperament. Ref. Merriam-Webster) and intolerant person. However, she refuted the speculation and asserted that strictness (Note: Definition of Strict (adjective) – rigorously conforming to principle or a norm or condition; allowing no deviation from a standard. Ref. Merriam-Webster) is necessary for an educator to ensure the proper delivery of lessons, even though this strictness is frequently mistaken for fierceness. As for the speculation of her being an intolerant individual, Syafinaz admits to being a perfectionist which often made it difficult for her to feel satisfied with the outcomes of her work. However, she also added that her perfectionist nature did not make her a completely intolerant person, but only in work related matters. Outside of working hours, Syafinaz is often described as amiable, warm and courteous by her students (including ex-students), fans, co-workers/artists as well as interviewers who interviewed her.

=== Social media ===
Though admitting to the importance of social media accounts as one of the means to keep entertainers relevant in the industry, she also firmly stated that she never had any social media accounts due to her daily hectic schedules and routines. However, due to her commitment for Mentor 7 in 2018, she announced her decision in creating an Instagram account with the initial intention of promoting her protégés; Lazarul and Ranisha. Since then, Syafinaz has been using her social media account not only for fan engagement and brand building, but also as a platform to impart her voice-art expertise.

=== Voice health ===
As a voice health advocate, Syafinaz works to educate the public, particularly among singers about this issue. She believes that singers must employ the proper and safe singing techniques for their voice to last a long period. Recently, Dato' Siti Nurhaliza has received assistance from Syafinaz in finding a team of specialists to help her recover her voice from the prior Covid-19 infection, thanks to Syafinaz's experiences and continuous collaborations with laryngologists and voice therapists.

=== Artworks ===
Along with performing, teaching, and judging singing competitions, Syafinaz is one of the advocates for the nation's art industry. She stated:

Being a professional musician is not just a hobby or passion, but it is a reputable profession. Today, the society must look at music as a serious profession and for those who wants to "enter" the music industry must be well equipped with skills and knowledge.

== Awards and honours ==
=== Entertainment ===
Year	Award	Category	Recipient/work	Result	Ref.
1999	World Championships of Performing Arts (WCOPA)	R&B/Pop/Rock/Contemporary	"Ingin Bersamamu"	Won	
1999	Anugerah Industri Muzik	Best Female Vocal	"Ingin Bersamamu"	Nominated	
1999	Anugerah Industri Muzik	Best Pop Album	Ingin Bersamamu (album)	Nominated	
1999	Anugerah Bintang Popular Berita Harian	Popular Female Singer	"Ingin Bersamamu"	Nominated	
1999	Anugerah Seri Angkasa	Best Female Vocal Performance	"Ingin Bersamamu"	Nominated	
2001	Anugerah ERA	Best Female Vocal	Syyh (album)	Nominated	
2009	Anugerah Shout!	Best On Screen Chemistry Award	"One In a Million season 2" with Paul Moss	Nominated	
2015	The Brandlaureate Grand Master Brand Icon	Grandmaster Leadership Icon	–	Won	
2018/2019	BARC Asia	Most Admired Leaders Asia	–	Won	
2021/2022	Women of Excellence (WOE) Awards	Excellent Achievement in The Music Industry	–	Won	

=== State honorific ===
To honour her contributions in education, entertainment, art and performances for four long decades, Syafinaz was awarded a Knight Commander (P.M.W.) medal of honour by Yang di-Pertuan Agong (King), Sultan Muhammad V during the Federal Territory Day in 2018. This honour gives Syafinaz an official Datukship title; Datuk Syafinaz Selamat.

- Federal Territory (Malaysia)
  - | Knight Commander (P.M.W.) – Datuk (2018)

== Discography ==
=== Studio album ===
- 1989: Syafinaz
- 1999: Ingin Bersamamu
- 2002: Syyh

=== Single ===
- 2019: "RahmatNya" feat. Ranisha and Lazarul
- 2021: "Persis Salju"

=== Featured singles ===
- 2009: "Mahkota" by Dennis Lau
- 2010: "Terpesona" by Frank Scott Hew
- 2023: "Glory" by Dennis Lau

== Acting credits ==
=== Theatre ===
- 2005: Rubiah
- 2010: The Adventures of Sinbad
- 2015: Opera Puteri Saadong

=== Film ===
- 2014: Kami Histeria (voice effects for Cik Lang, portrayed by Fazura)
- 2023: Bas Terakhir Malam Raya (featured as Mak Inaz)

=== Drama series ===
- 2023: One Million Dollar Voice (featured as a competition judge)
