= Alternate Records & Talents =

Independent record label

- Parent company: Media Prima
- Founded: 2006
- Founder: Ahmad Izham Omar
- Status: Active
- Distributor: Alternate Records Sdn Bhd
- Genre: Various
- Country of origin: Malaysia
- Location: Balai Berita, Bangsar, Kuala Lumpur, Malaysia

Alternate Records Sdn Bhd, doing business as Alternate Records & Talents, formerly Monkey Bone Records is an independent record label set up by Ahmad Izham Omar, the CEO of 8TV. It was created in 2006 to sign winners and potential contestants of 8TV's reality show One in a Million should they be unsigned.

Alternate signed the Winner and First Runner-up for "Lagu Cari Tuan" organized by Hot FM which is Pendekar and Voice In Public, Suki Low Sook Yee and Norayu Damit, winners of One in a Million seasons one and two as well as Faizal Tahir and Shila, runners-up of their respective seasons.

Alternate is also the organiser of KAMI The Gig, a gig throughout Malaysia. The first gig in 2007 was held in Sungai Petani (8 August), Johor Bahru (25 August), and Kuala Lumpur (8 September), while in 2008, 22 indie bands from Malaysia performed in Johor Bahru (28 June), Ipoh (5 July), Malacca (19 July), Penang (26 July), Kuala Lumpur (9 August), and Seremban (24 August). The last stop will be in Bukit Jalil on 18 October.

Monkey Bone changed its name to Alternate Records & Talents to match the company name in July 2021.
