= One in a Million season 2 =

One in a Million
- Season 2

Release
- Original network: 8TV
- Original release: 16 November 2007 – 29 February 2008

Season chronology
- Next → Season 3

One in a Million is Malaysia's first ever reality singing competition to offer a RM 1 million prize to the winner. The second season began on 16 November 2007, resuming to its former timeslot at 9:30 pm on 8TV. The season had been marred by a restriction imposed on 8TV against airing live telecasts, as a result of season one's runner-up Faizal Tahir breaching the decency code during 8TV's birthday concert on mid-January 2008. Nevertheless, the show went on and on 29 February 2008, in a Grand Finale which was aired delayed by 30 minutes from Shah Alam, Sabahan Norayu Damit became the overall champion and new owner of RM1,000,000 as funding for a musical career.

== Early Process ==
=== Auditions ===
The auditions for the second season began in August. Two more audition locations were added (Sungai Petani and Johor Bahru) compared to the only two last year. One in a Million Roadshows were also held in the three locations in the peninsula, featuring Season 1 finalists and other Malaysian artistes. The first three audition legs were edited into one episode for the season début.

- Kota Kinabalu: The first leg was held in Le Meridien Hotel in Kota Kinabalu, Sabah on 19 August 2007. 400 people participated and out of them, only ten made it through to the next level. Among those who made the cut who were featured on the broadcast were Zaidi bin Tuah and Mark Malim.
- Sungai Petani: The second auditions leg was held in Cinta Sayang Resort, Sungai Petani on 25 August 2007. 391 took part in this leg, but only seven made the cut, including (as shown on TV): Simon Christopher, Nur Izareena, Joni Tham, Siti Hajar, Daniel Boone and Khairullah Ezuan.
- Johor Bahru: The third leg was held in Persada Johor, Johor Bahru, on 2 September 2007, and saw 394 try their luck but only ten move on to the next round. They included Season 1 reject Farhana binti Mohd.
- Kuala Lumpur: The final leg of the auditions underwent in Berjaya Times Square, Kuala Lumpur for two days, i.e. on 8 and 9 September 2007. Notably, this leg saw the participation of recording artistes following the footsteps of Dayang Nurfaizah last year.

=== Central Eliminations ===
Eighty contestants have been selected from all four audition venues and they headed on to SEGi College, Kota Damansara, to proceed to the Central Eliminations. They were split into two groups, one of 40 boys and the other of 40 girls. The boys proceed first, with each singing one of four songs: Dewi by Dewa, Lelaki Ini (Anuar Zain); My Wish (Rascal Flatts); and Once in a Lifetime (Keith Urban); whereas the girls take on Terlalu Istimewa (Adibah Noor); Satu Harapan (Jaclyn Victor); When You're Gone (Avril Lavigne); and Never Again (Kelly Clarkson), the following day.

Only forty contestants proceed to the next challenge which was also held in the campus. On the day of the cut, the contestants were split into groups and the photographs of each group were displayed on a screen and, as the hosts explained, some of which were removed (though not always), denoting either of two things for the contestants whose photos remain on the screen: either they made the cut or got cut out.

The contestants who made the cut are:

Male

- Anas
- Addy
- Shone
- GD
- Eddz
- Abraham
- Edham
- Rex
- Azmir
- Joel
- Izz
- Mior
- Ewan
- Mark
- Hanif
- Bryan
- Rony
- Firdaus
- Rizal
- Simon

Female

- Nana
- Shaney
- Baby
- Elya
- Eila
- Haida
- Auni
- Ayu
- Joni
- Sarah
- Rinie
- Kaka
- Farah
- Dewi
- Nas
- Shila
- Shikin
- Tiara
- Azrinna
- Intan

A notable contestant who did not make the cut was Ben, the visually impaired contestant from the Kuala Lumpur auditions, who remarked about Syafinaz's comments on his "lack of eye contact".

Later on, the remaining 40 proceed to the Blind Test, in which they perform behind a translucent screen, which only their silhouettes can be seen at the other side. The judges evaluated their performances based primarily on their vocals.

The next day, two guest judges, former Miss Malaysia Elaine Daly and entertainer Zainal Alam Kadir, were brought in for the Style and Personality Test alongside Syafinaz and Moss. Among the criteria that the panel of four were evaluating included the contestants' purpose of joining the competition, how they present themselves on the stage and also their aesthetic appearance. The judges lamented that the contestants were too "timid and shy", and showed their weaknesses more than their strengths.

Nevertheless, the judges decided to allow half of the contestants to move on as usual.

=== Knock-Out ===
The remaining twenty were divided into ten pairs, with the contestants in each pair faring against each other for a place in the top twelve. Unlike the previous season in which the contestants were ranked in order of performance quality and each one of the ten best performers picks a rival from the other ten, this time there is no indication of how the contestants are paired.

The outcome of this round is solely in the hands of the two judges, unlike the previous season in which an extra "second chance" show was held to get the audience to vote for one contestant into the next level along with another judges' choice. From each pair, one contestant who the judges found performed better than the other qualified into the next round, making it ten altogether. The remaining two were each selected by one of the two judges.

The contestants who won from their pairing are indicated in yellow; the two wildcards in orange (each along with the judge who shortlisted them).

Simon – It's My Life (Bon Jovi)	against	Shila – Tak Ada Logika (Agnes Monica)
Ayu – Mencintaimu (Krisdayanti)	against	Azmir – Cintakan Membawamu Kembali (Dewa)
Tiara – Angel (Sarah McLachlan)	against	Joel – Fever (Peggy Lee)
Bryan – Everyday I Love You (Boyzone)	against	Intan – If I Ain't Got You (Alicia Keys)
Shone – Play That Funky Music (Wild Cherry) (Moss' choice)	against	Iz – Time ()
Rony – Wild World (Cat Stevens)	against	G.D. – Jangan Bersedih Lagi (Anuar Zain)
Sarah – Di Akhir Garisan (Ziana Zain)	against	Rina – Kali Pertama (Fairuz Hussein) (Syafinaz's choice)
Mior – Semua Untukmu (Anuar Zain)	against	Joni – Only in the Dark (Juwita Suwito)
Mark – Solitaire (Neil Sedaka)	against	Nana – Big Girls Don't Cry (Fergie)
Ab – I Live My Life for You (FireHouse)	against	Ryzal – Ain't No Mountain High Enough (Marvin Gaye & Tammi Terrell)

== Top 12 Finalists ==
The beginning with this point, viewers can vote for their favourite contestants and also vote against those whom they want out of the competition. The outcome of each voting session, which lasts from the moment after the performances for the night are over till the following Monday at 8 pm, will be announced in the beginning of the next show. The Top Twelve Finalists (with their respective voting codes and ages) are:

Contestants	Age	Hometown	Ranking

1. Nur Shahila bte Amir Amzah (Shila, 18)
2. Norayu binti Damit (Ayu, 18)
3. Tunku Tiara Yasmin Sofia (Tiara, 20)
4. Ungku Intan Sarafina binti Ungku Yahya (Intan, 26)
5. Siti Sarah Raisuddin (Sarah, 23)
6. Joni Tham Chi Won (Joni, 22)
7. Khairullah Ezuan bin Sulaini (Iz, 24)
8. Shahron Hussein (Rony, 27)
9. Mark Glenn Malim (Mark, 23)
10. Abraham Edwin (Ab, 24)
11. Shone Eric Jr. Majimbun (Shone, 27)
12. Nor Azrinna Azahar (Rina, 24)

== Performances ==
=== Week 1: Top 12 (21 December 2007) ===
The theme of the first week of performances is "Pop", in the sense of popular, mainstream music. Below are the Top 12 and their respective performances in order of appearance:

Contestant	Song (original artist)
Ab	"Naluri Lelaki" (Samsons)
Tiara	"How to Touch a Girl" (JoJo)
Sarah	"Listen" (Beyoncé Knowles)
Joni	"Tatoo" (Jordin Sparks)
Rony	"Aku Mau" (Once)
Iz	"Wait For You" (Elliot Yamin)
Intan	"Sampai Menutup Mata" (Acha Septriasa)
Ayu	"Samudera" (Nora)
Mark	"No Promises" (Shayne Ward)
Rina	"Hurt" (Christina Aguilera)
Shila	"Too Little Too Late" (JoJo)
Shone	"Itu Kamu" (Estranged)

The finalists heard mostly undesirable comments from the two judges, with Sarah, Iz and Shone given the most favourable.

=== Week 2: Top 10 (28 December 2007) ===
The night started off with announcing the outcome of the first round of public voting, which sent off Rony and Rina. It was also noted that Sarah received the third fewest votes.

The theme of the night was "My Hero", in which each contestant sings a song from their favourite singer.

- Eliminated: Rina - "Hurt" (Christina Aguilera) & Rony - "Aku Mau" (Once)

Contestant	Song (original artist)
Shila	"Stuck" (Stacie Orrico)
Intan	"Pilihlah Aku" (Krisdayanti)
Shone	"Kasih Berubah" (Ferhad)
Ayu	"Langit Ke-7" (Sharifah Zarina)
Iz	"When I Get You Alone" (Robin Thicke)
Joni	"My Happy Ending" (Avril Lavigne)
Tiara	"Andaikan Kau Datang Kembali" (Ruth Sahanaya)
Mark	"Wonderful World" (James Morrison)
Ab	"Picture Of You" (Boyzone)
Sarah	"Lady Marmalade" (LaBelle)

The judges' opinion on their performances were somewhat more desirable than the previous week's, and Ayu received the most favourable comments from them. The judges also reminded them that.

=== Week 3: Top 9 (4 January 2008) ===
As anticipated by the judges, Tiara was eliminated from the competition, before the "Rock"-themed performances commenced, in which contestants perform a song of the rock genre, or modify a non-rock song to fit into the night's theme as done by Joni and Shila.

- Eliminated: Tiara - "Andaikan Kau Datang Kembali" (Ruth Sahanaya)

Contestant	Song (original artist)
Shone	"It's Alright Now" (The Beloved)
Ayu	"Aku Dia Dan Kamu" (D-Va)
Sarah	"Fantasia Bulan Madu" (Search)
Joni	"Umbrella" (Rihanna feat Jay Z)
Iz	"Suci Dalam Debu" (Iklim)
Intan	"Wake Up Call" (Maroon 5)
Mark	"Tapi Bukan Aku" (Kerispatih)
Ab	"Time is Running Out" (Muse)
Shila	"Oops!... I Did It Again" (Britney Spears)

Among the nine, Ab and Shila received the most positive comments from both judges, which Syafinaz stressed when the host asked the judges who are the strongest and weakest among the finalists; Paul remarked that Intan was the weakest.

=== Week 4: Top 8 (11 January 2008) ===
The elimination round saw Iz missing out of the "R&B"-themed night.

- Eliminated: Iz - "Suci Dalam Debu" (Iklim)

Contestant	Song (original artist)
Sarah	"Penasaran" (Emilia Contessa) + "Deja Vu" (Beyoncé Knowles)
Ab	"Keabadian Cinta" (Anuar Zain)
Shila	"Di Bawah Pohon Asmara" (Jaclyn Victor)
Mark	"Everytime I Close My Eyes" (Babyface)
Ayu	"Ceritera Cinta" (Jaclyn Victor & Rio Febrian)
Shone	"Let's Stay Together" (Al Green)
Joni	"Belaian Jiwa" (Innuendo)
Intan	"Semusim" (Marcell)

Sarah was praised for fusing a dangdut song and an R&B song into one; others whom the judges found most commendable included Shila, Mark and Ayu, while Ab, Shone, Joni and Intan received the wrong end of the judges' sharp tongues. Sabah-born, US-based Che'Nelle made a special appearance at the end of the show, inviting the Top 8 to dance along with her when she sings Hurry Up. Paul urged the Top 8 to emulate Che'Nelle by making their performances more magical and "raise goosebumps".

=== Week 5: Top 7 (18 January 2008) ===
Intan Sarafina was the first recording artiste to be voted off this season, leaving her out from the "50s to 70s" themed performances. Comedian and one-time recording artiste Afdlin Shauki became the first guest judge since the competitive performances commenced.

- Eliminated: Intan - "Semusim" (Marcell)

Contestant	Song (original artist)
Ayu	"Tari Tualang Tiga" (Saloma)
Shila	"I'll Be There" (Jackson 5)
Shone	"Mustang Sally" (Wilson Picket)
Joni	"Somewhere Over The Rainbow" (Judy Garland)
Mark	"You Make Me Feel Brand New" (The Stylistics)
Sarah	"Always On My Mind" (Willie Nelson)
Ab	"Crazy Little Thing Called Love" (Queen)

Overall, the judges' criticisms reflected a lacklustre delivery from five of the seven contestants, leaving Sarah and Ab with the most positive comments, albeit still pointing out flaws. This was the last OIAM show to be aired live for the season, as 8TV has been stripped of its live and delayed telecasting rights in the aftermath of Season 1 runner-up Faizal Tahir's obscene stunt in the previous week's "live" concert.

=== Week 6: Top 6 (25 January 2008) ===
In the first recorded performances of OIAM (which were taken two days before telecast) Joni was voted off the competition, leaving the other six in contention, singing the "Greatest Movie Hits".

- Eliminated: Joni - "Yue Liang Sai Biao Wo De Xin" (Teresa Teng) + "Fly Me To The Moon" (Frank Sinatra)

Contestant	Song (original artist)	Film
Ab	"That Thing You Do" (The Wonders)	That Thing You Do!
Sarah	"I Have Nothing" (Whitney Houston)	The Bodyguard
Ayu	"My Heart Will Go On" (Celine Dion)	Titanic
Shila	"Car Wash" (Christina Aguilera feat Missy Elliott)	Shark Tale
Shone	"Iris" (Goo Goo Dolls)	City of Angels
Mark	"Hujung Dunia" (Nitrus)	Goodbye Boys

Overall, the performances received commendations from the judges, with the exception of Mark whom the judges found as having "lost the X-factor." Despite being emotionally disturbed backstage before her turn, Ayu received the most positive remarks from Syafinaz and Moss, who said it felt "organic".

=== Week 7: Top 5 (1 February 2008) ===
Before the elimination round, the hosts asked the judges whom to expect to be in the Top 3; Syafinaz expected Sarah, Ab and Ayu; while Paul quipped that all would be female contestants.

Shone became the first Sabahan to leave the competition which saw all four contestants of Sabahan origin remain in contention to this point.

The following are the Top 5 with their respective duet partners, being the original singers of the songs performed (unless stated)

- Eliminated: Shone - "Sewaktu Dulu" (Flop Poppy, feat Andy)

Contestant	Guest Artist	Song (original artist)
Sarah	Damian Mikhail	"Janji Manismu" (Aishah)
Mark	Farah Asyikin	"Sempurna" (Farah Asyikin)
Shila	Alif Satar	"Khayal" (Alif Satar)
Mark	Nurul Wahab	"Keliru" (Ajai & Nurul)
Ayu	Jaclyn Victor	"Cinta" (Melly Goeslaw & Krisdayanti)

Mark was reprimanded for not showing any significant improvement, whereas Sarah was praised for being the strongest finalist thus far. There was no competition for the week of 8 February to make way for Chinese New Year. Instead, 8TV produced and aired a One in a Million Chinese New Year special in which most of the Top 12 prepare for a special visit to a children's home for the festival.

=== Week 8: Top 4 (15 February 2008) ===
The outcome of the previous fortnight's performance saw Mark leaving the stage, leaving the remaining four to battle it out with love songs.

- Eliminated: Mark - "If You Were My Baby" (Rick Price)

Contestant	Song (original artist)
Ab	"Swear It Again" (Westlife)
Ayu	"My All" (Mariah Carey)
Sarah	"I Turn to You" (Christina Aguilera)
Shila	"Contigo en la Distancia" (Luis Miguel)

Shila was noted for singing a Spanish song, thus remarked by Moss as finally making herself taken seriously. The rest, however, were given some less comforting remarks, with Sarah and Ayu chided for being "predictable" while Ab was pointed out for his clothing which reminded Syafinaz of the penguins in Happy Feet.

=== Week 9: Top 3 - Semifinal (22 February 2008) ===
OIAM had turned into an all-female showdown as a result of Ab's elimination as the "last man standing". As there were only three finalists left, each had to sing two songs: one chosen by the other contestants and the other by the organizers of the show.
1st Round Performance

Contestant	Song (original artist)
Sarah	"Sinaran" (Sheila Majid)
Ayu	"Ketentuan" (Ramlah Ram)
Shila	"Bukan Milikmu Lagi" (Agnes Monica)

2nd Round Performance

Contestant	Song (original artist)
Sarah	"Apologize" (Timbaland feat OneRepublic)
Ayu	"Dialah Dihati" (Dato' Siti Nurhaliza)
Shila	"Love Like This" (Natasha Bedingfield feat Sean Kingston)

=== Week 10: Top 2 - Grand Finale (29 February 2008) ===
Due to the restriction imposed upon 8TV in the aftermath of Faizal Tahir's actions, the Grand Finale of OIAM could not go "live", instead it was aired delayed by 30 minutes from Stadium Melawati, Shah Alam. (Note that the restriction originally also prohibited delayed telecasts.)

The concert commenced with the reappearance of eight other contestants eliminated earlier this season, for a group performance: Joni, Rina, Tiara and Intan belt out Lady Marmalade followed by Rony, Mark, Ab and Iz with Alright Now, and after that, all eight combined to perform Itu Kamu. The opening performance ended with the Top 3 — Sarah, Shila and Ayu — performing Destinasi Cinta.

As announced, one of them would be eliminated before the showdown, thus missing out the pursuit of the RM1 million bounty to the eventual Top 2, and that person was Sarah who had to make way for Ayu and Shila. Each of the Top 2 sang three tunes each: one judges' pick, one own choice and one new composition by some of Malaysia's top songwriters. 1st Round Performances

Contestant	Song (original artist)

2nd Round Performances

Contestant	Song (original artist)

3rd Round Performances

Contestant	Song (original artist)

- Runner-Up: Shila
- Champion: Ayu

Ayu
1. Samudera (Nora)
2. Ceritera Cinta (Jaclyn Victor)
3. Hanya di Mercu (ciptaan Aubrey Suwito/Habsah Hassan)
Shila
1. Contigo en la Distancia (Luis Miguel)
2. Memori Tercipta (ciptaan Aubrey Suwito/Tinta S)
3. medley Oops! I Did It Again (Britney Spears) + Stuck (Stacie Orrico)

The voting line opened for an hour beginning with Ayu's first song at about 9:30 pm (telecast time).

Local independent band Hujan were the guest performers of the night, performing Pagi yang Gelap and Empayarmu after the two ended their showdown performances. Albeit already voted out, yet Sarah was given a chance to sing her new song from Audi Mok and Nurfatima, Pasti Berbeza. Moments toward the announcement of the final results Ayu and Shila performed a duet with Aku Bukan Untukmu.

At approximately 10:55 pm (broadcast time), Awal announced that the champion not only clinched the RM1 million, also the cash would be guaranteed by OIAM for the benefit of her music career. After a tense moment as an animated cheque appears on the screen, slowly displaying the name of the winner, finally Awal and Marion crowned Norayu binti Damit as the champion of OIAM season two.

== Elimination chart ==
Finals:	Elimination Week:	28 Dec	4 Jan	11 Jan	18 Jan	25 Jan	1 Feb	15 Feb	22 Feb	29 Feb
Place	Contestant	Result								
1	Norayu binti Damit			Btm 3			Btm 3			CHAMPION
2	NurShahila binti Amir Amzah									RUNNER-UP
3	Siti Sarah Raisuddin	Btm 4	Btm 3			Btm 2	Btm 4	Btm 3	Btm 2	3rd place
4	Abraham Edwin			Btm 4	Btm 4	Btm 3		Btm 2	Elim	
5	Mark Glenn Malim	Btm 4	Btm 5		Btm 2	Btm 4	Btm 2	Elim		
6	Shone Eric Jr. Majimbun						Elim			
7	Joni Tham Chi Won	Btm 5			Btm 3	Elim				
8	Ungku Intan Sarafina Ungku Yahya		Btm 2	Btm 2	Elim					
9	Khairullah Ezuan Sulaini	Btm 6	Btm 4	Elim						
10	Tunku Tiara Yasmin Sofia		Elim							
11	Shahron Hussein	Elim								
12	Nor Azrinna Azahar	Elim								

== Trivia ==
- Shone Eric Jr. Majimbun was formerly a contestant from the first workshop of the Season 2 of Malaysian Idol

== See also ==
- One in a Million (season 1)
- Malaysian Idol
- Paul Moss
- Syafinaz Selamat
- 8TV
