= Shila Amzah (album) =

Studio album by Shila Amzah
- Released: December 10, 2013
- Recorded: 2011−2013
- Studio: NAR Records, Kuala Lumpur, Malaysia
- Genre: Pop, mandopop
- Length: 28:02
- Language: Malay, Chinese
- Label: Shila Amzah Entertainment
- Producer: ND Lala (exec.); Shila Amzah (exec.); Helen Yap; Tan Boon Huat

Shila Amzah chronology
Bebaskan (2009)	Shila Amzah (2013)	My Journey (2016)

Singles from Shila Amzah
- 1. "Patah Seribu" Released: July 20, 2012

Shila Amzah is the fifth studio album by Malaysian singer-songwriter Shila Amzah. It was released on December 10, 2013, through Shila Amzah Entertainment Berhad and distributed by Warner Music Malaysia. Shila began preparing for the album after winning Asian Wave, and during a significant amount of media scrutiny. Over the course of the short songwriting period, she primarily collaborated with Malaysia's most popular producer Helen Yap and Aubrey Suwito.

== Background ==
Before she released the album, she held a preview of the album at Red Box Plus, Pavilion, Kuala Lumpur on July 5, 2013. A further showcase of the album was held at Penthouse, The Icon, Kuala Lumpur on October 16, 2013. Shila Amzah's record producer was herself, ND Lala, Helen Yap, Tan Boon Huat and the sound engineer for this album was Aubrey Suwito, Zairi Ariffin, Yusalman Azua, Hadie Pranoto, Amir Sulaiman and Greg Henderson. The album was released on iTunes on December 10, 2013. In December 2013, Shila Amzah released her official music video of "Masih Aku Cinta". This music video was based on her love story when she broke up with Sharnaaz Ahmad, a Malaysian actor after a controversy involving Sharnaaz Ahmad with Shila's father.

== Credits and personnel ==
As listed in the liner notes.

Recording and management

- Recorded and mixed at NAR Records (Kuala Lumpur, Malaysia)
- Mastered at Sterling Sound (New York City, United States of America)
- Shila Amzah Entertainment Berhad and Shanghai Media Group Records

Personnel

- Wan Izhar – photographer
- Shila Amzah – wardrobe stylist, lead vocals, executive producer, vocal harmony, songwriter, composer
- Yanna Husin – hijab stylist, wardrobe stylist
- Rosman Nizar – booklet design, cover art, graphic design
- Fiza Zainuddin – make-up artist
- ND Lala – executive producer
- Helen Yap – producer
- Tan Boon Hat – producer
- Hadie Pranoto – engineer
- Yusalman Azua – engineer
- Zairi Ariffin – engineer
- Aubrey Suwito – engineer
- Greg Henderson – engineer
- Amir Sulaiman – engineer, mixing
- Tom Coyne – mastering

== Awards and nominations ==
Year	Competition/Association	Category/Award	Nominated work	Result	Host country
2013	Anugerah Planet Muzik	Malaysian Song of the Year	Masih Aku Cinta	Won	Malaysia Singapore Indonesia
2013	Anugerah Planet Muzik	Regional Song of the Year	Patah Seribu	Nominated	Malaysia Singapore Indonesia
2014	World Music Awards	World's Best Song	Masih Aku Cinta	Nominated	United States
2014	World Music Awards	World's Best Video	Masih Aku Cinta	Nominated	United States
2014	29th Anugerah Juara Lagu	First Runner-Up	Masih Aku Cinta	Won	Malaysia
2014	21st Malaysian Music Awards	Album of the Year	"Shila Amzah"	Nominated	Malaysia
2014	21st Malaysian Music Awards	Best Female Vocal	Cinta Hati	Nominated	Malaysia
2014	21st Malaysian Music Awards	Engineered Album of the Year	"Shila Amzah"	Nominated	Malaysia

== Track listing ==
Shila Amzah – Standard edition
No.	Title	Writer(s)	Producer(s)	Length
1.	"Sedar"	Shila Amzah	Helen Yap; Shila Amzah	3:34
2.	"Masih Aku Cinta"	Shila Amzah	Helen Yap; Shila Amzah	4:58
3.	"Cinta Hati"	Shila Amzah	Helen Yap; Shila Amzah	4:05
4.	"Tulus"	Shila Amzah	Helen Yap; Shila Amzah	4:04
5.	"Maaf"	Shila Amzah	Aubrey Suwito; Shila Amzah	3:34
6.	"Xia Yi Bu"	Shila Amzah	Ong Peng Chu; Shila Amzah	3:53
7.	"Patah Seribu"	Shila Amzah	Shila Amzah	3:54
Total length:				28:02
