= All Together Now Malaysia =

- Based on: All Together Now
- Directed by: Haniq Halim (FDAM)
- Presented by: Sherry Alhadad
- Country of origin: Malaysia
- Original language: Malay
- No. of seasons: 2
- No. of episodes: 10 + 3 specials (at 24 April 2023)

Production
- Running time: 90 minutes
- Production company: Banijay Asia

Original release
- Network: Astro Ria
- Release: 12 September 2021 – 5 February 2023

Related
- All Together Now (franchise)

All Together Now Malaysia is a Malaysian reality television music competition series aired on Astro Ria hosted by Sherry Alhadad. It is a Malay version of the series based on British reality television music competition series, All Together Now. The series premiered on 6 June 2021.

On 9 June 2021, Astro had decided to halt the broadcast of the show for the time being due to violation of not following the Standard Operating Procedures (SOPs) during the period of Conditional Movement Control Order (CMCO).

The series then re-broadcast on 12 September 2021 after three months being halted on the channel.

The series has been renewed for second season and will be premiered starting 11 December 2022.

== Format ==
Compared to the original show, the Malaysia edition has only 50 jurors. The jurors consist of a head of jurors, known as captain, followed by the other 49 jurors as well. Each jurors carry two scores to vote and choose act performers in every act by pressing the buzzer.

=== The heats ===
During each heat, performers try and outscore their competitors in order to earn a seat on the top three podium. Whenever a performer scores high enough for a podium place, the act in 3rd place is eliminated as a result. From each heat, two acts go through to the series final. Once all acts have sung, the 1st placed performer with the highest score automatically goes through. The acts in 2nd and 3rd sing off against one another and the winner of that sing off earns the second qualification spot.

=== Tie-breaks ===
In the event of a tied score, the decision can be made only by the captain in which one of the two acts is the best act. If the captain chose the new act (performer), the existing act from the podium is going to be replaced with that act and vice versa.

=== The sing-off ===
For the sing-off at the end of the show, scores are reset to zero and the second and third placed acts perform a new song chosen by the performer itself. In the event that one of the two acts has the higher scores, the performer with the higher scores qualified to the final.

== See also ==
- All Together Now franchise
