= SM Nasarudin SM Nasimuddin =

Malaysian entrepreneur (born 1983)

- Born: SM Nasarudin bin SM Nasimuddin; August 9, 1983 (age 43); Kuala Pilah, Negeri Sembilan, Malaysia
- Occupations: Entrepreneur, Chairman of the Naza Group
- Spouse: Marion Caunter (m. 2010)
- Children: 3
- Parent(s): SM Nasimuddin SM Amin (father); Zaleha Ismail (mother)

SM Nasarudin SM Nasimuddin (born 9 August 1983) is a Malaysian entrepreneur. He holds the position of chairman of the Naza Group and also the former President of the Paralympic Council of Malaysia.

== Career ==
After graduating in business economics from University of Southern California in the United States, he joined Naza Kia Sdn Bhd as a management trainee in 2005.

In 2006, he was appointed head of operations of Naza Corporation Sdn Bhd and took over as CEO of three Naza companies that year – Nasim Sdn Bhd (Peugeot franchise), Naza Corporation Sdn Bhd, and NZ Diners Sdn Bhd (food business, Bubba Gump Shrimp).

He was appointed chairman and CEO of Naza effective 16 May 2008 to replace his father, SM Nasimuddin SM Amin who died on 1 May 2008. This appointment was made to fulfill SM Nasimuddin's wishes.

He also held the position of President of the Paralympic Council of Malaysia from 2016 to 2019.

== Personal life ==
SM Nasarudin was born and raised in Kuala Pilah, Negeri Sembilan. On December 17, 2010, he married TV personality, Marion Caunter. Nasarudin and Marion have three children.
