= The 8TV Quickie =

- Genre: Interactive
- Created by: Ahmad Izham Omar
- Opening theme: Dash - We Are Over Here
- Country of origin: Malaysia
- Original language: English

Production
- Producer: Primeworks Studios (August 2008–2016)
- Production locations: Studio Mini, Sri Pentas, Bandar Utama, Petaling Jaya, Selangor
- Running time: 15 minutes with one commercial break (11:30 pm or 12:00 am editions); 1 minute (9:30 pm and 10:30 pm)

Original release
- Network: 8TV
- Release: 8 January 2004 – 31 March 2016

Related
- 8TV Express

The 8TV Quickie was a 15-minute television variety show that aired every night on 8TV in Malaysia since the network launched on 8 January 2004. The segments were essentially unscripted, allowing the hosts to have candid conversations on-air. The show featured interviews, live performances, and the opportunity or viewers to call in.

The most recent hosts were Brandon Ho, Mark O’Dea, Timur Gabriel (daughter of Malaysian singer, Zainal Abidin Mohamad), Jenn Chia Yen-Yi and Zubaidah "Zooey" Mohd Noor Amir.

Starting 1 April 2016 onwards, the original time slot of "The 8TV Quickie" was replaced by 8TV Express, a Chinese variety show of the same type at 10:30pm.

== Format ==
The first two air for one minute as a sneak preview, and the last one, the regular edition, is 15 minutes with a single commercial break. The last opening sequence of the show features the song "We Are Over Here" by Malaysian band, Dash.

In the main 15-minute show, the hosts usually introduces the preview of a current movie, play creative games and receive calls from the audience to participate in contests to win prizes. Occasionally, celebrities come on as guests of the show or music bands perform on the show.

== History ==
The 8TV Quickie premiered on 8 January 2004, the first day 8TV started its transmission at 9.30pm. The programme originally aired twice every night for 15 minutes, which is weeknights at 9:30 pm and 11:45 pm and weekends at 10.30pm and 11.45 pm. In 2005, 8TV shortened its 9:30 pm edition to a one-minute slot while the 11:30 pm edition continues in its 15-minute slot.

The schedule of 8TV Quickie was as follows: Monday, Tuesday, Thursday, Friday: 11:30 pm Wednesday: 10:00 pm Saturday: 12:30 am Sunday: 12:00 am

In March 2016, it was announced that The 8TV Quickie would be drawing its curtains. Due to new programme rescheduling implemented on 1 April 2016 that focused mainly on Chinese programmes, The 8TV Quickie aired its final episode on 8TV on 31 March 2016.

== Hosts ==
Originally, the hosts were Soo Kui Jien and Marion Caunter. Soo Kui Jien, better known as just Jien, left the show in February 2004, only a month after its launch. He was replaced by Adam Carruthers who began hosting The 8TV Quickie in March 2004.

In May 2006, Aishah Sinclair became a regular replacement host for Marion Caunter who became increasingly busy with 8TV's new reality show, One In A Million. In September 2006, Adam left the show, with Aishah and newcomer Keshminder Sadhu (Kesh) taking over as permanent hosts. Later that year, Marion Caunter similarly announced her departure from The 8TV Quickie, eventually landing a job as a VJ on Channel [V].

In January 2007, the Quickie welcomed another new addition in former newscaster Edleen Ismail. However, his residence on the show along with Kesh turned out to be short-lived, as both hosts announced their departures in February and April respectively. Razif Hashim, joined the show in April of that year. In the following month, Belinda Chee of Teman join the Quickie, family with Aishah and Razif announcing their departures from the show the following year. Aishah Sinclair left to join ntv7's Venus and Razif Hashim decided to further his studies in the UK. They were replaced by Phat Fabes and Rina Omar, with Henry Golding eventually joining.

In 2009, Phat Fabes and Rina Omar signed off for the last time, with Fly FM announcer Prem Shankar and newcomer Zher Peen taking over the reins. Hunny Madu, also of Fly FM, joined the crew soon after.

Subsequent hosts included Jun Yong, Naqib Shamsuri, Ryan Matjeraie, Adam Zain, Prem Shanker, Zher Peen, Julie Woon, Megan Tan and Nadia Nash. Brandon Ho and British performer and model, Mark O'Dea, later became regular hosts alongside Megan Tan.

In mid-2015, new hosts were added to the show. They were Timur Gabriel, Jenn Chia Yen-Yi and Zubaidah "Zooey" Mohd Noor Amir. Megan Tan left the show to join the Go Asean channel.

The show aired its last episode on television on 31 March 2016. During the finale, several former hosts attended the show and expressed their reminiscence of the show. Among them were Jun Yong, Phat Fabes, Nadia Nash and Marion Caunter.

It was announced that The 8TV Quickie would continue to be produced on alternative media in other formats after its conclusion on traditional television.

=== Last hosts ===
These were the hosts of 8TV Quickie at the time of its final broadcast on 31 March 2016.

- Mark O’Dea
- Brandon Ho
- Timur Gabriel
- Jenn Chia Yen-Yi
- Zubaidah Mohd Noor Amir

=== Former hosts ===
- Hunny Madu
- Soo Kui Jien
- Marion Caunter
- Adam Carruthers
- Aishah Sinclair
- Keshminder Sadhu
- Edleen Ismail
- Razif Hashim
- Belinda Chee
- Phat Fabes
- Rina Omar
- Henry Golding
- Jun Yong
- Naqib Shamsuri
- Ryan Matjeraie
- Adam Zain
- Prem Shanker
- Zher Peen
- Julie Woon
- Megan Tan
- Nadia Nash
