= Stellantis Gurun =

Automotive manufacturing subsidiary of Stellantis

Stellantis Gurun (Malaysia) Sdn Bhd
- Trade name: Stellantis Gurun Plant
- Formerly: Naza Automotive Manufacturing Sdn Bhd (2002-2021)
- Type: Private
- Industry: Automotive
- Founded: 2002; 24 years ago
- Headquarters: Gurun, Kedah, Malaysia
- Products: Car, Automotive Parts
- Number of employees: More than 400
- Parent: Stellantis

Stellantis Gurun (Malaysia) Sdn Bhd (formerly Naza Automotive Manufacturing Sdn Bhd, abbreviated NAM) is an automotive manufacturing subsidiary of Stellantis in Malaysia. It is headquartered in Gurun, Kedah.

The company was established in 2002 and by 2003, the construction of NAM's own manufacturing plant commenced. The manufacturing plant was built on a 140 acres (57 ha) parcel of land and comprises an assembly plant, a two-storey office, a test track, lots for vendors and suppliers, staff accommodation and recreation facilities.

In February 2018, NAM was taken over by PSA Group, which later merged with Fiat Chrysler to form Stellantis in 2021. The plant is now called the Stellantis Gurun Plant.

== History and milestones ==
- September 2002: Ground Breaking Ceremony in Gurun, Kedah
- April 2003: Construction NAM Plant in Gurun begins
- May 2004: NAM commences operations in Gurun, Kedah
- August 2004: Start of production for the Naza Ria
- December 2004: Start of production for the Naza Citra
- May 2005: NAM is certified ISO 9001:200
- November 2005: Start of production for the Kia Spectra
- May 2006: Launch of the Naza 206 Bestari
- July 2008: Launch of the Peugeot 407
- September 2008: Start of production for the Kia Pregio
- January 2009: Launch of the Peugeot 308
- October 2009: Launch of the Kia Picanto
- November 2009: Launch of the Kia Forte
- November 2009: NAM is certified ISO 14001
- November 2010: Launch of the Peugeot 207
- March 2011: Launch of the Forte 6-Speed
- September 2011: Production of 150,000th vehicle
- February 2018: Gurun plant sold to PSA Group

== Production ==
=== Peugeot ===
==== Current models ====
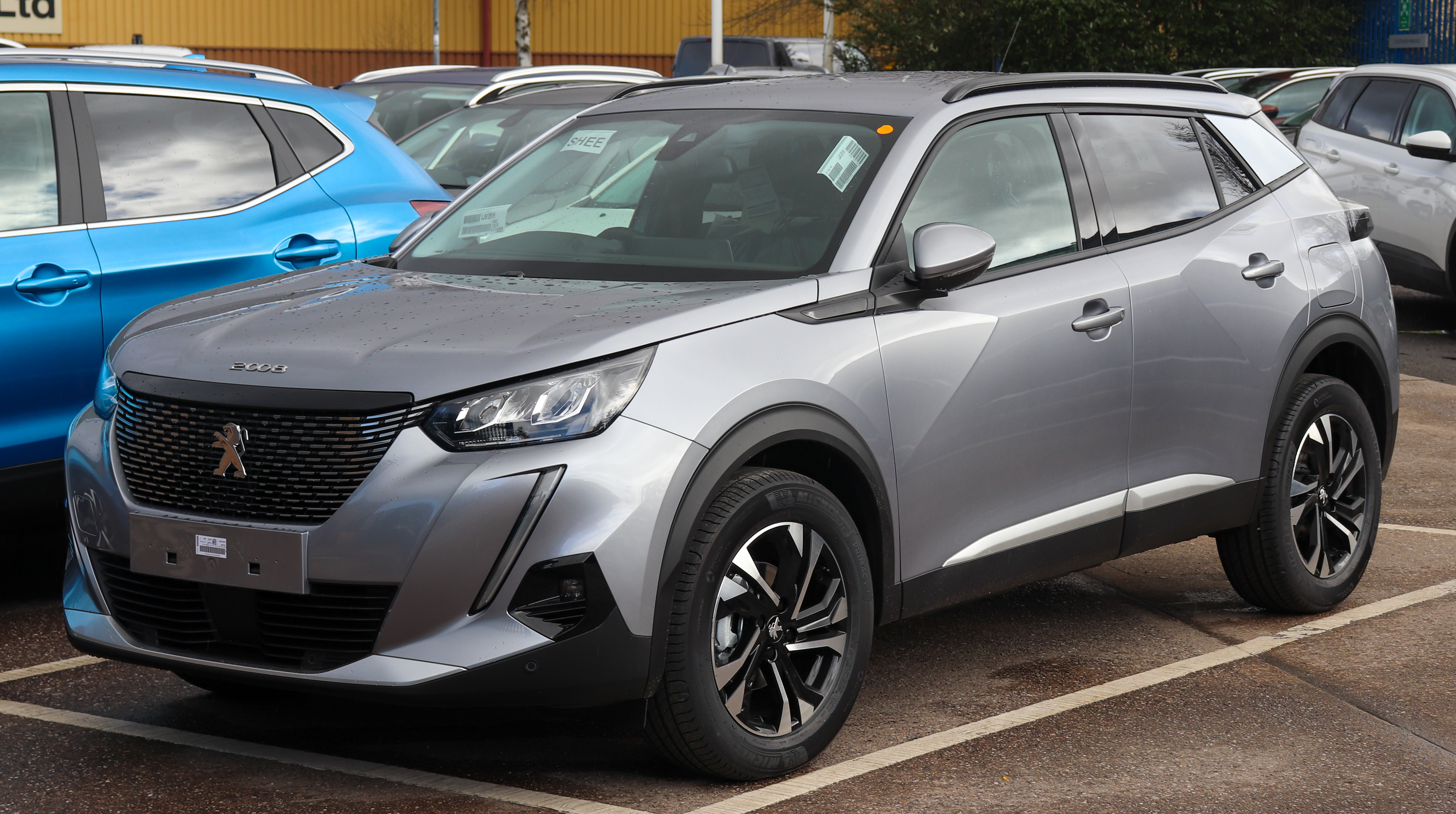
Peugeot 2008

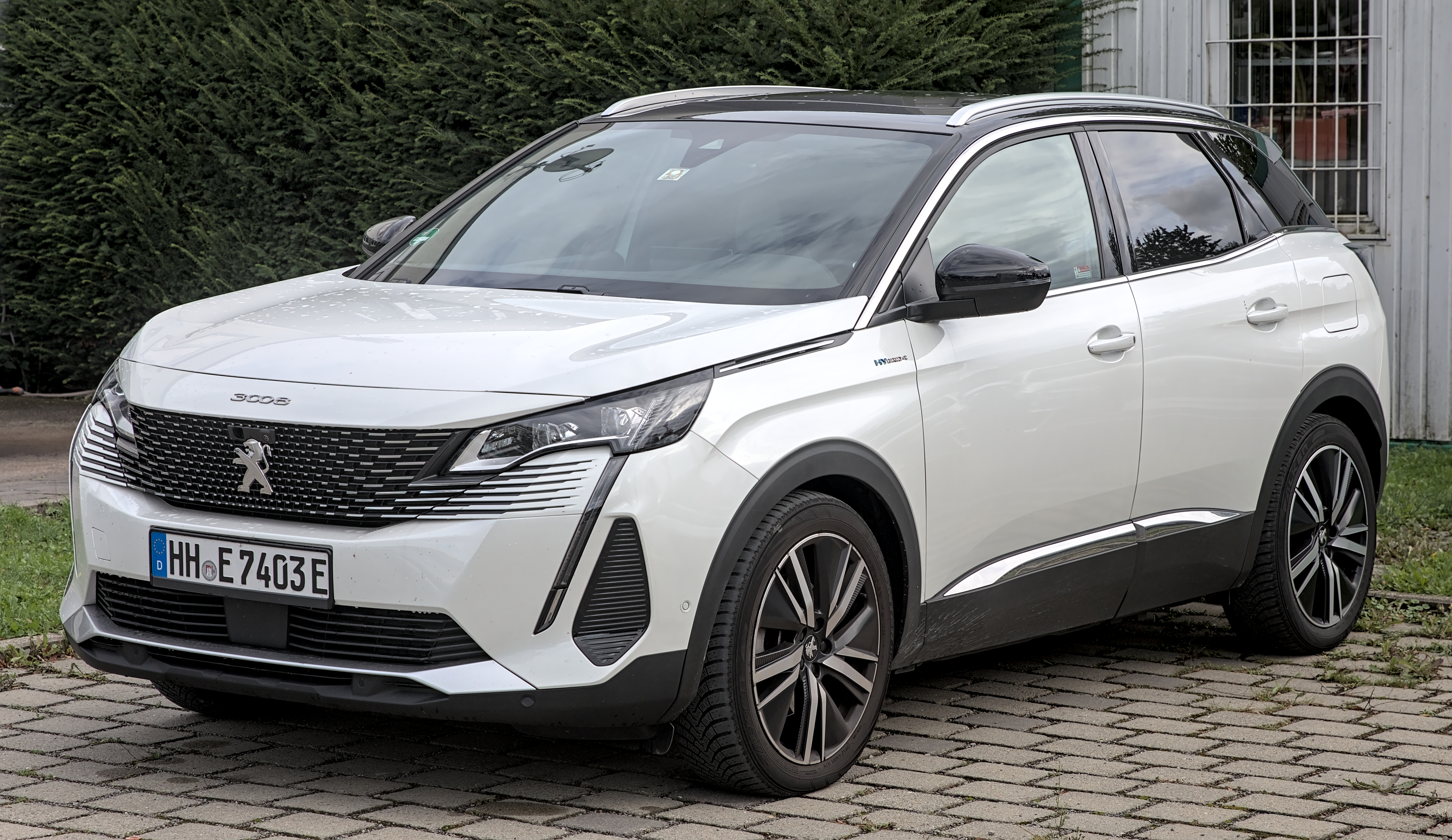
Peugeot 3008

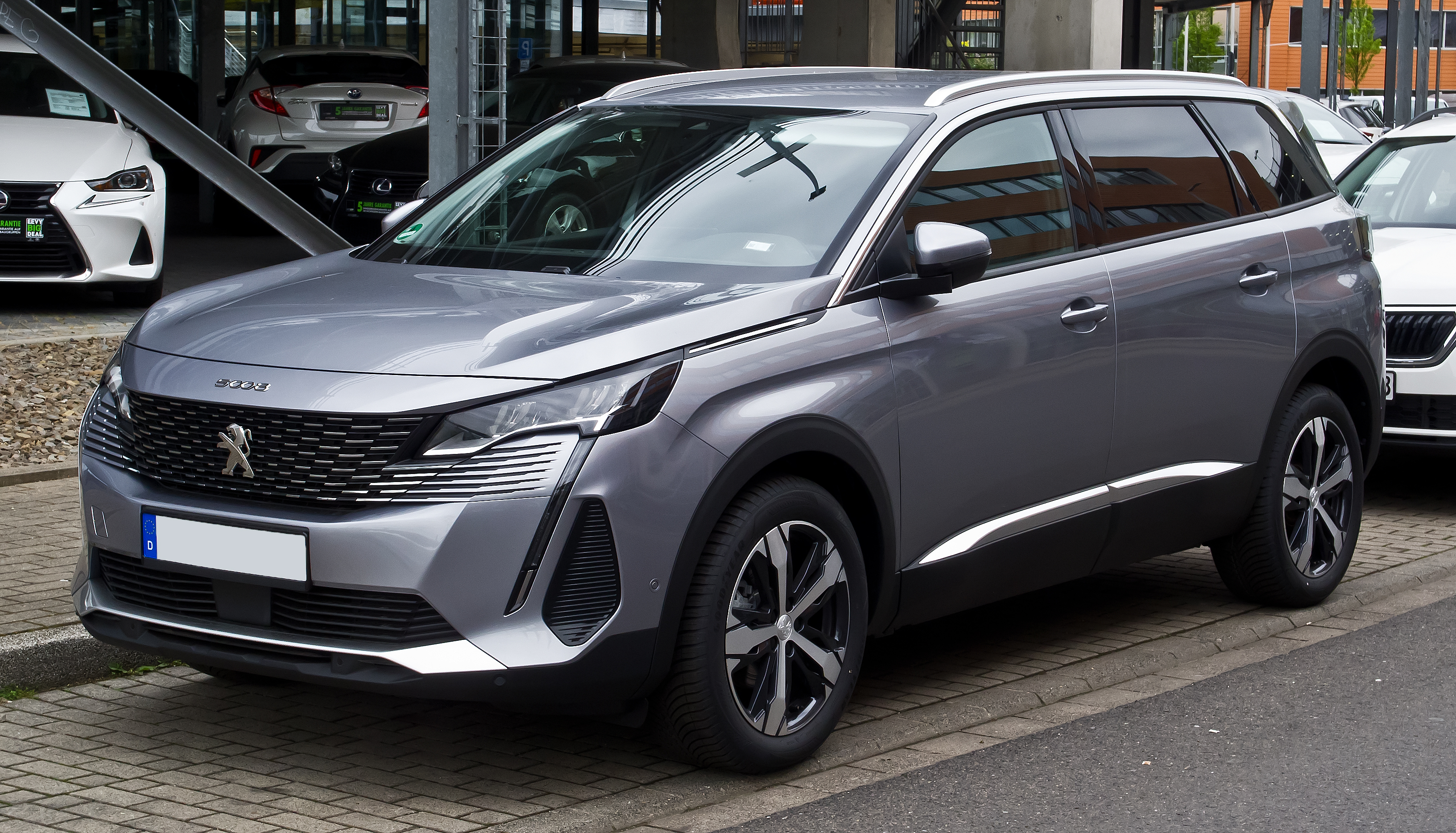
Peugeot 5008

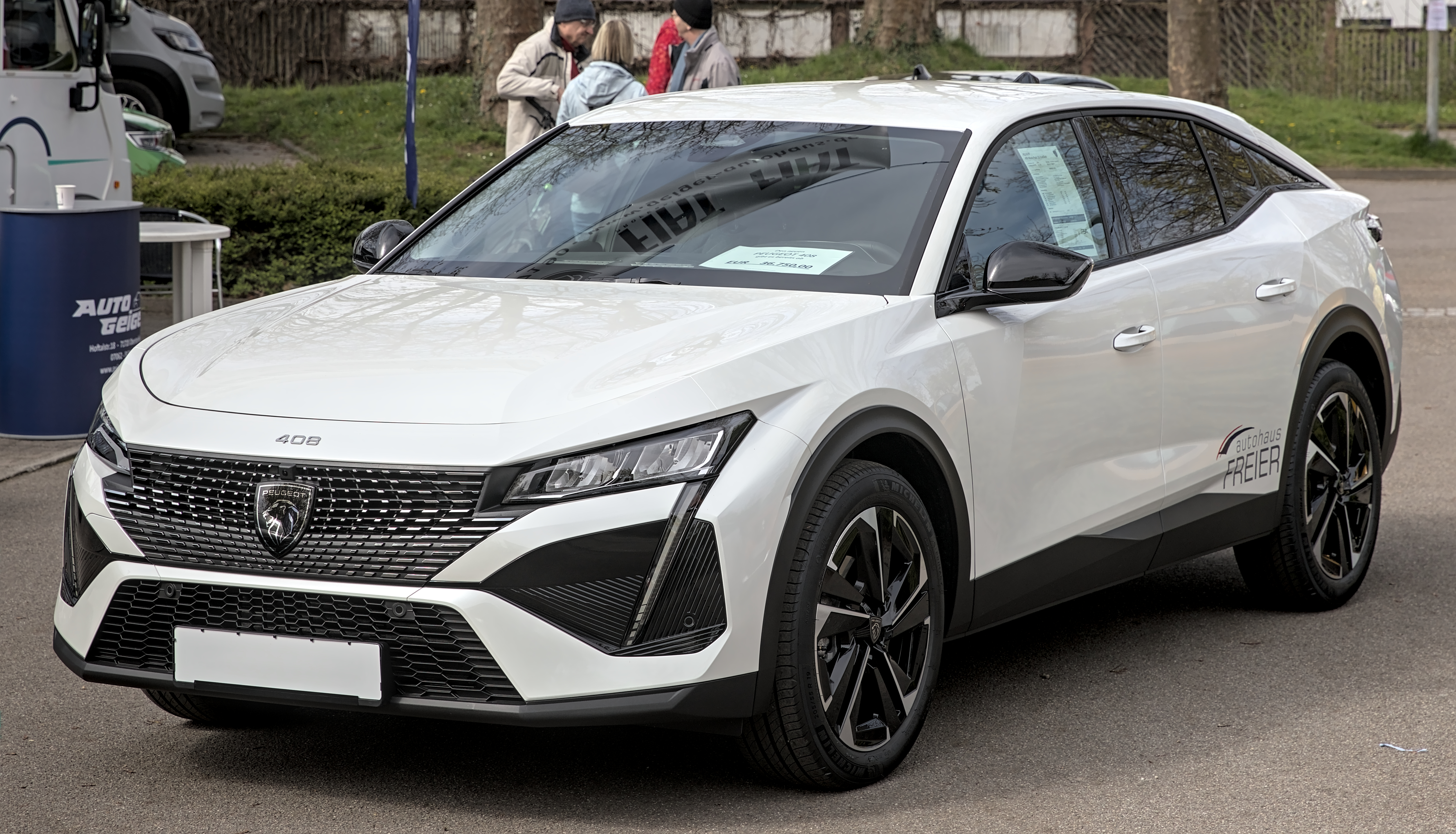
Peugeot 408

=== Leapmotor ===
==== Current models ====
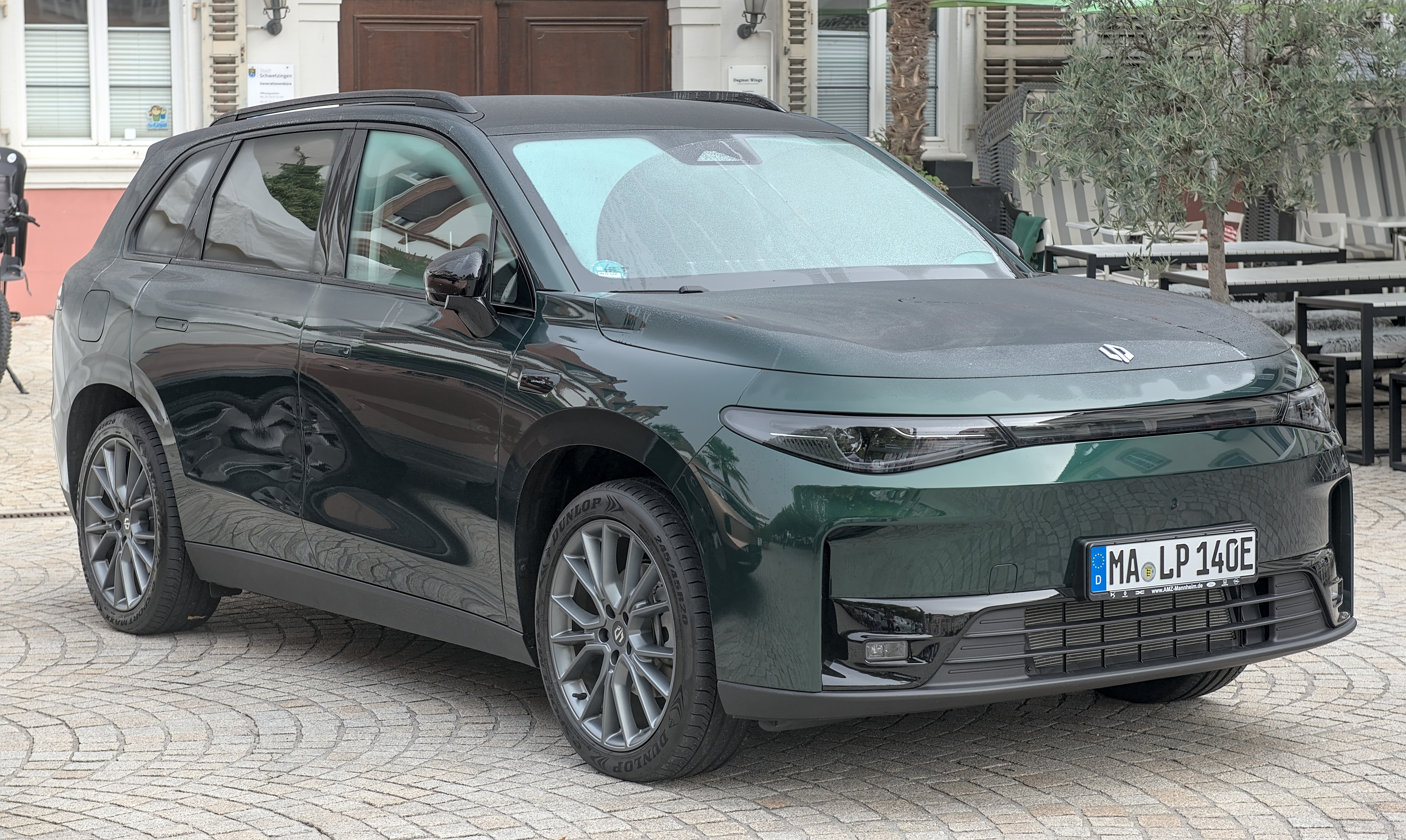
Leapmotor C10

== See also ==
- Naza Group - Parent company
- Nasim (NSB) - Peugeot distributor
