= Marion Caunter =

Malaysian TV personality

- Born: Marion Rose Caunter; November 5, 1980 (age 45); Georgetown, Penang, Malaysia
- Other name: Marion Rose Caunter Abdullah
- Occupations: Television host, radio announcer, emcee, dj
- Years active: 2004–present
- Spouse: SM Nasarudin SM Nasimuddin (m. 2010)

Marion Rose Caunter binti Abdullah (née Marion Rose Caunter, born November 5, 1980) is a TV personality from Southeast Asia, whose TV career began as host of 8TV's late night variety show "The Quickie".

== Early life and education ==
Marion Rose Caunter was born on November 5,1980 in Penang, Malaysia.

Caunter attended Marquette University in Milwaukee, Wisconsin, US, graduating with a Bachelor's degree in Electronic Broadcasting and Communications.

== Career ==
Caunter began her career as a reporter for Milwaukee's WB 18 Channel, followed by a period with the Los Angeles radio station KIIS-FM. Upon her return to Malaysia, Caunter became well-known as the host of 8TV’s late night variety show "the Quickie" followed by engagements with One in a Million, The Biggest Loser and Channel V's Poparazzi, and later with ESPN and E! News Asia channels.

== Personal life ==
On December 17, 2010, having converted to Islam from Roman Catholicism, Marion Caunter and Naza Group's chief executive officer SM Nasarudin SM Nasimuddin got married in a private family wedding. They have two daughters and one son.

== Recognitions ==
2021 – she was listed as one of Asia's most influential people by Tatler

== Filmography ==
=== Film ===
- Misteri Jalan Lama (2011)

=== Television ===
- The 8TV Quickie (8TV)
- E! (Asian TV channel)
- One in a Million (Malaysian TV series)
- The Biggest Loser Asia (Diva Universal)
- Poparazzi (Channel [V])
- Old Road Mistery
