= Tutti Frutti Frozen Yogurt =

American retail chain

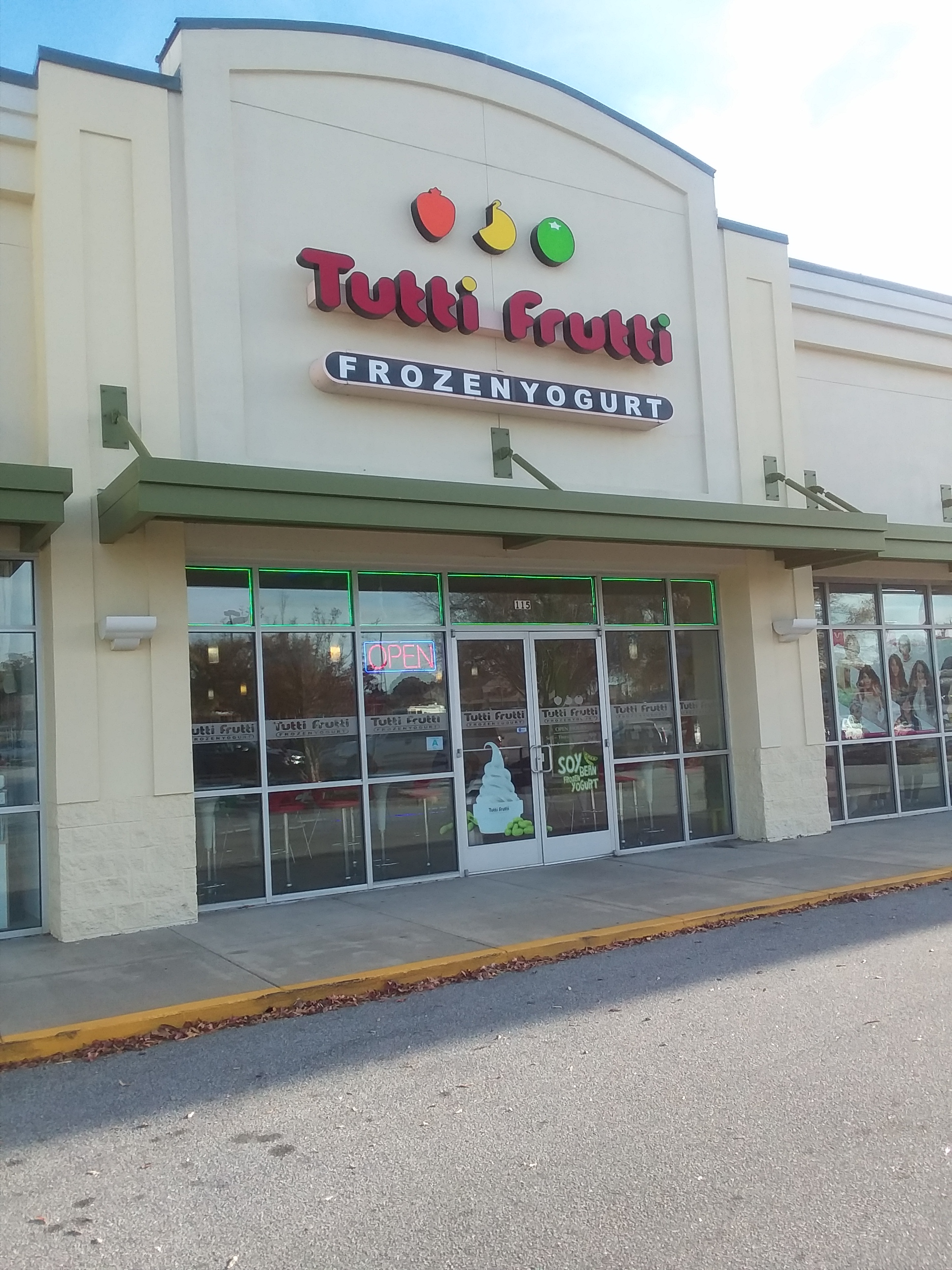
- The Tutti Frutti Frozen Yogurt store location in Mauldin, South Carolina
- Industry: Restaurants
- Headquarters: Fullerton, California, United States
- Area served: Australia, Bahrain, Brazil, Canada, Jamaica, Malaysia, Mexico, Nigeria, United Arab Emirates, United States
- Products: Frozen yogurt

Tutti Frutti Frozen Yogurt is an American retail chain of self-serve frozen yogurt. Tutti Frutti has over 100 outlets in California and other states in the US.

== History ==
Introduced in 2008 to the United States consumers, Tutti Frutti Frozen Yogurt expanded to many other countries, including Brazil and Malaysia in 2009, United Arab Emirates in 2010, and the United Kingdom in 2011.

=== Naza Group ===
Naza Tutti Frutti's operations include the expansion of the brand in Malaysia, Singapore, Thailand, Cambodia, and Brunei. Its first flagship store opened in October 2009. By the end of 2009, they had plans for another 4 stores, "25 outlets by the end of 2010, [double that] by 2012," or 30 outlets by March 2011. In April 2012, the number of Tutti Frutti retail outlets has reached 90 overall, 85 of which are located in Malaysia.

Although it had never been a part of their franchise fees, they have tentative plans to implement the royalty fees in the year 2015.

=== TFUK ===
Tutti Frutti United Kingdom (TFUK) enters the European market with its first store located in Covent Garden, Central London on December, 2011. As of November 2013 the Covent Garden (London) branch is closed.

TFUK has previously sponsored Danny Webb in the 2012 Grand Prix motorcycle racing in Qatar and Brad Binder, MotoGP rider.

In the February/March 2012 issue of United Kingdom's Better Business magazine, it was featured as a franchise with good prospects.

== Locations ==
According to the store locator on Tutti Frutti corporate website, Texas, Louisiana, and Florida rank behind California in terms of having the most number of Tutti Frutti stores.

Internationally, Tutti Frutti is present in Australia, Bahrain, Brazil, Canada, Jamaica, Malaysia, Mexico, Nigeria and United Arab Emirates and been previously in Armenia, Brunei, Cambodia, China, Colombia, Costa Rica, Dominican Republic, India, Indonesia, Macau, Pakistan, Peru, Philippines, Russia, Qatar, Singapore, Tahiti, Taiwan, United Kingdom and Vietnam.

Due to a negative reception, Tutti Frutti's entry into Hong Kong resulted in closure of all seven of its store locations in Hong Kong and the surrounding area.

== See also ==
- List of frozen yogurt companies
