= Peugeot 2008 =

Subcompact crossover SUV

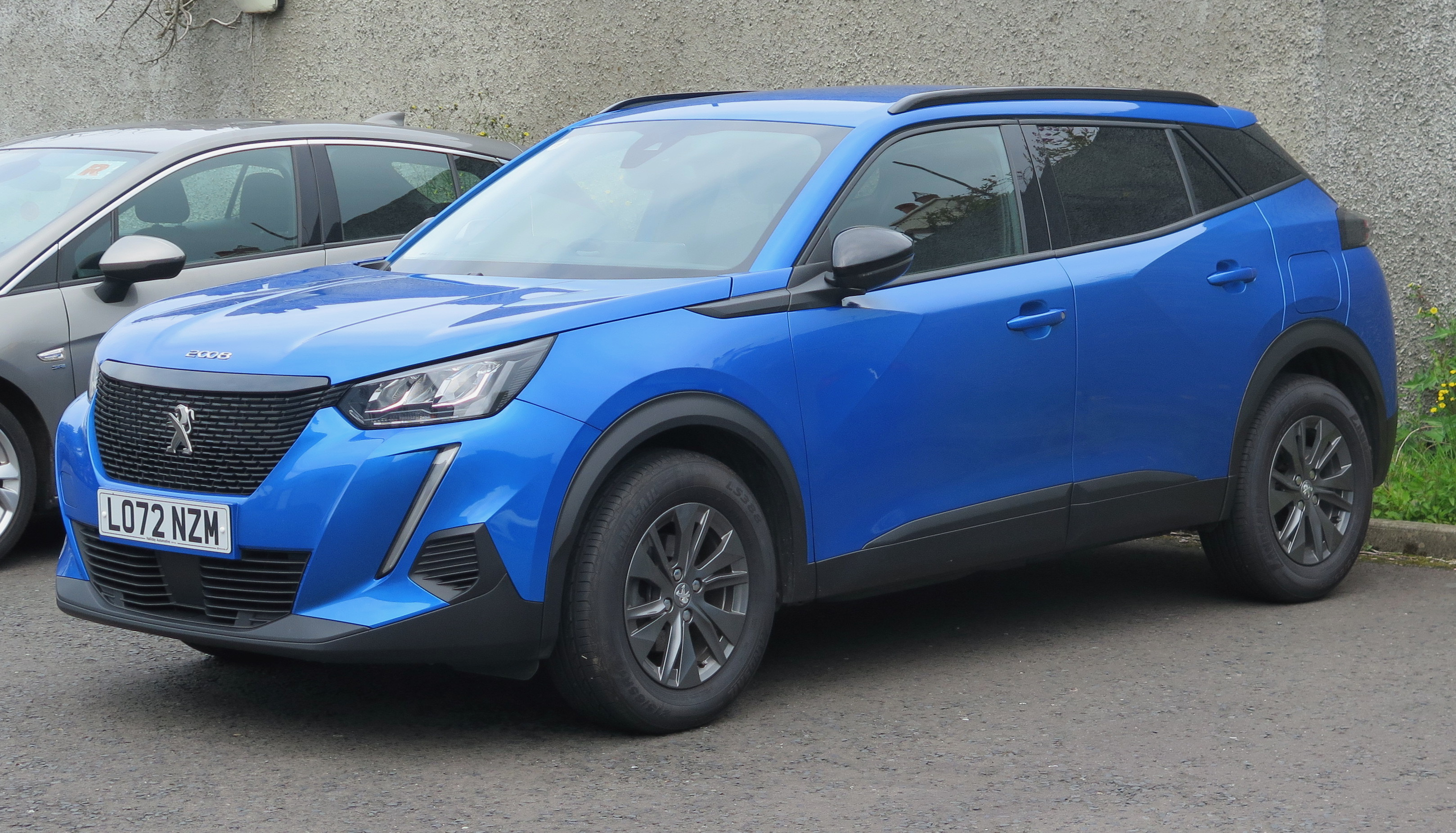
- Peugeot 2008 (second generation)

Overview
- Manufacturer: Peugeot (Note: PSA Group (2013–2021); Stellantis (2021–present))
- Production: 2013–present

Body and chassis
- Class: Subcompact SUV (B-segment)
- Body style: 5-door crossover SUV
- Layout: Front-engine, front-wheel-drive
- Related: Peugeot 208; IKCO Reera

Chronology
- Predecessor: Peugeot 207 SW

The Peugeot 2008 is a subcompact SUV (B-segment) produced by the French automaker Peugeot. Unveiled at the 2013 Geneva Motor Show and positioned below the 3008, the first 2008 replaced the Peugeot 207 SW, as Peugeot did not release a station wagon version of its 208.

== First generation (A94; 2013) ==
First generation
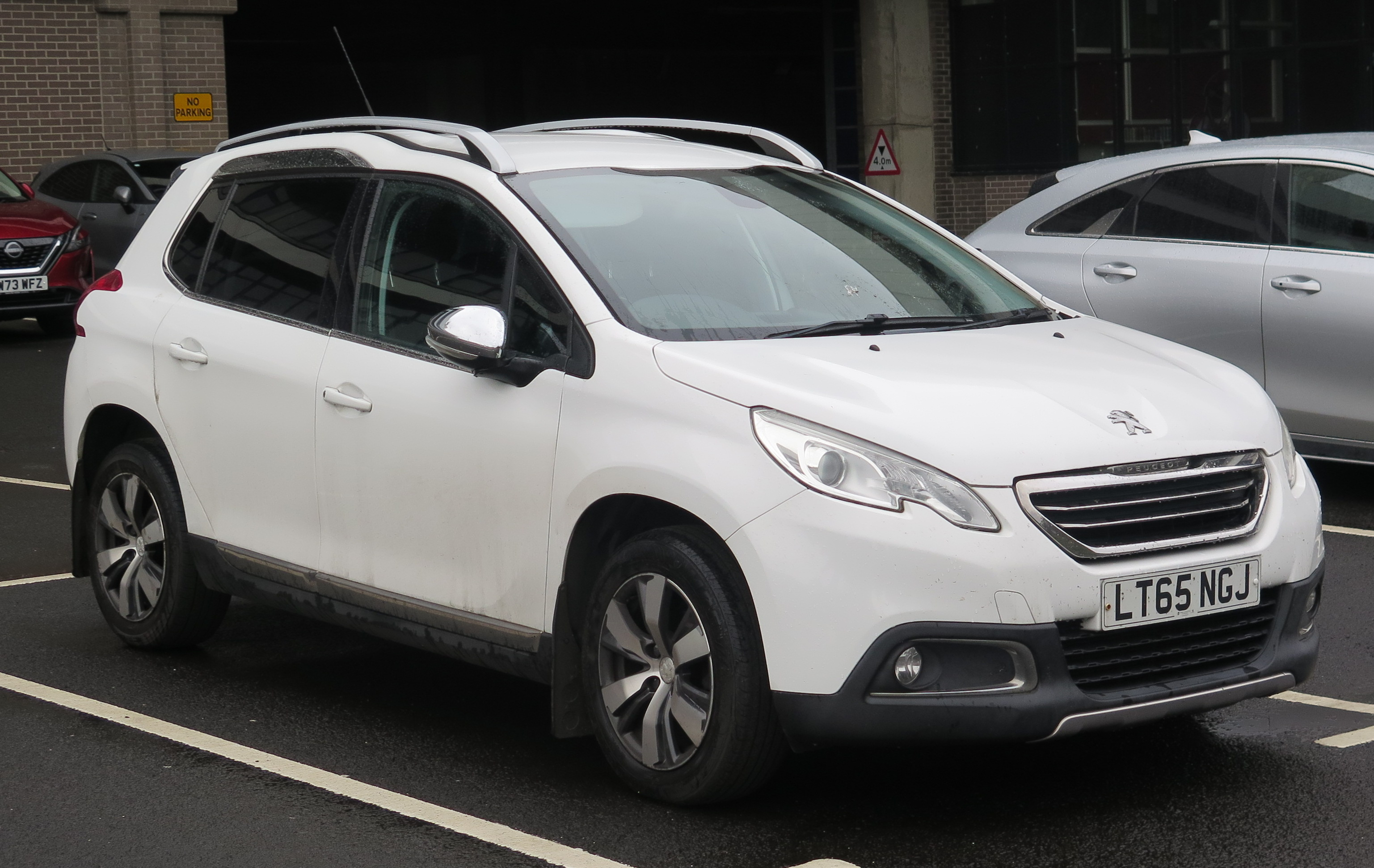
- 2015 Peugeot 2008

Overview
- Model code: A94
- Production: 2013–2023; 2013–2019 (Europe); 2014–2019 (China); 2015–2023 (Brazil)
- Assembly: France: Mulhouse (Mulhouse Plant); Sochaux (Sochaux Plant); Brazil: Porto Real (PSA Brazil); China: Wuhan (DPCA); Iran: Tehran (IKAP); Malaysia: Gurun (NAM)
- Designer: Pierre Authier

Body and chassis
- Platform: PSA PF1 platform
- Related: Peugeot 208; Citroën C3 Aircross; Opel Crossland

Powertrain
- Engine: Petrol: 1.2 L PSA EB2 e VTi/VTi I3; 1.2 L PSA EB2ADTX e THP I3; 1.6 L Prince EP6 VTi I4; 1.6 L Prince EP6DT THP Flex I4; Diesel: 1.4 L Ford DV4 HDi I4; 1.5 L Ford DV5 BlueHDi I4; 1.6 L Ford DV6 e-HDi I4; 1.6 L Ford DV6 BlueHDi I4
- Transmission: 5/6-speed manual (BVM5/BVM6); 5/6-speed automated manual (Auto5R/Auto6R); 5/6-speed semi-automatic (ETG5/ETG6); 4-speed ZF AL4 automatic (BVA); 6-speed Aisin AWTF-80 SC automatic (EAT6)

Dimensions
- Wheelbase: 2,538 mm (99.9 in)
- Length: 4,158 mm (163.7 in)
- Width: 1,740 mm (68.5 in)
- Height: 1,557 mm (61.3 in)
- Curb weight: 1,045 kg (2,304 lb)

The first-generation 2008 was developed under code name "A94" and is based on the PF1 platform, sharing electronic components with the Peugeot 208. The revised version was presented at the Geneva Motor Show in March 2016.

The 2008, the mass production of which also started, is the first product of the joint venture between the two companies of Peugeot and IKCO named IKAP. The 2008 features a 1.6 inline four Turbo engine, producing 165 PS (121 kW; 163 hp) and 243 N⋅m (179 lb⋅ft) of torque at 4,000 rpm. The 2008's six speed automatic gearbox transfers the engine power to the front wheels. It is available with a five speed manual gearbox, or a six speed manual, according to engine size. As of 2017, it became available with a six speed automatic (1.2 turbo petrol).

The Peugeot 2008 is available with Peugeot's grip control system. This is available on 1.6-litre petrol and 1.6-litre diesel models. Grip control equipped models are supplied with all season M+S Tyres of Goodyear.

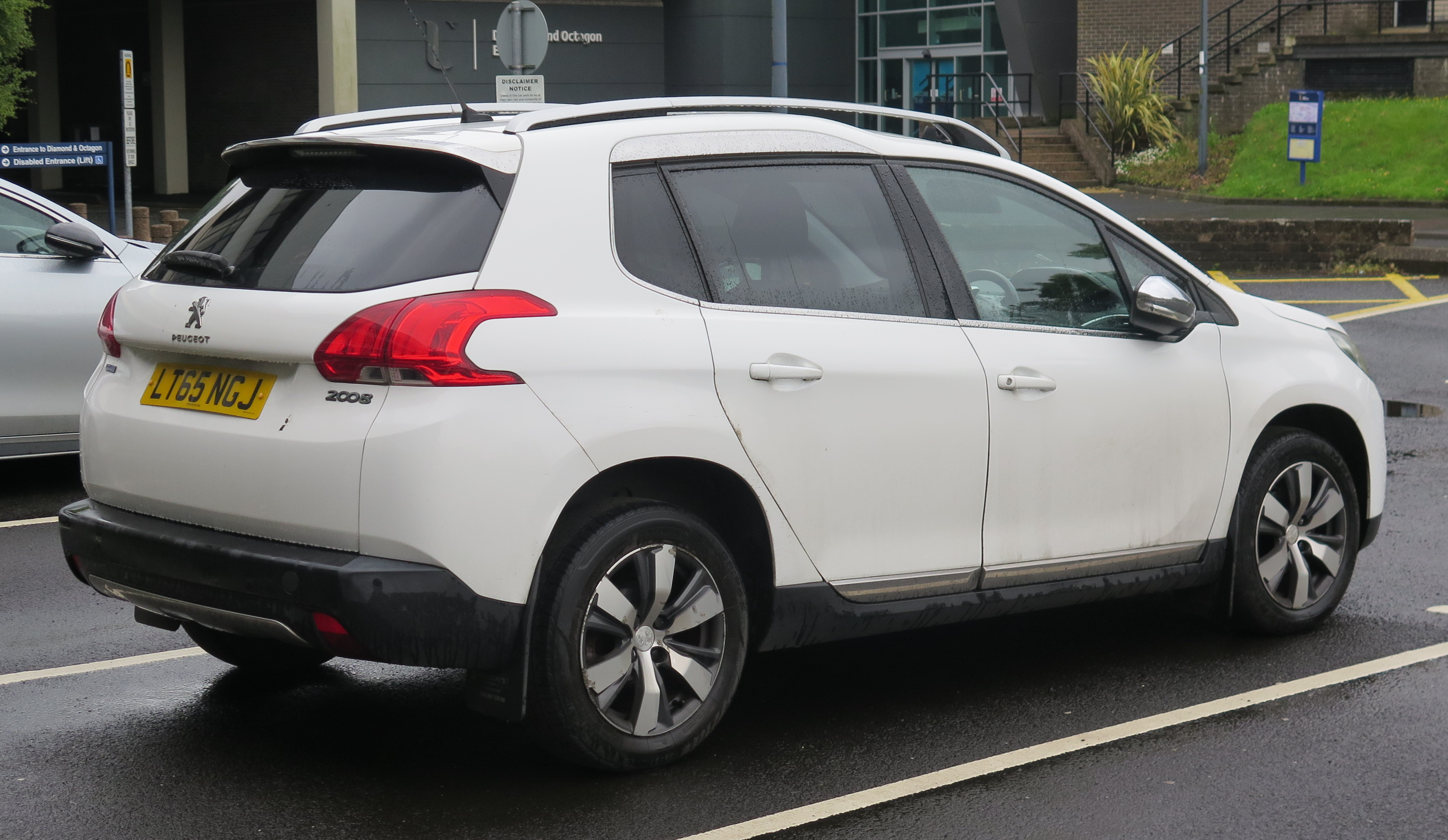
2015 Peugeot 2008 (pre-facelift, UK)

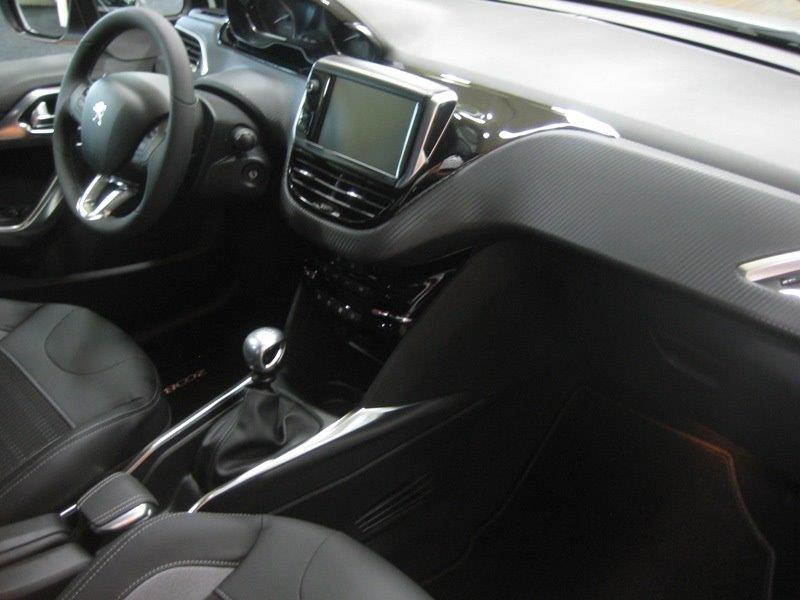
Interior

=== Facelift (2016) ===
The facelifted version of the 2008 was unveiled on February 18, 2016 at the Geneva Motor Show.

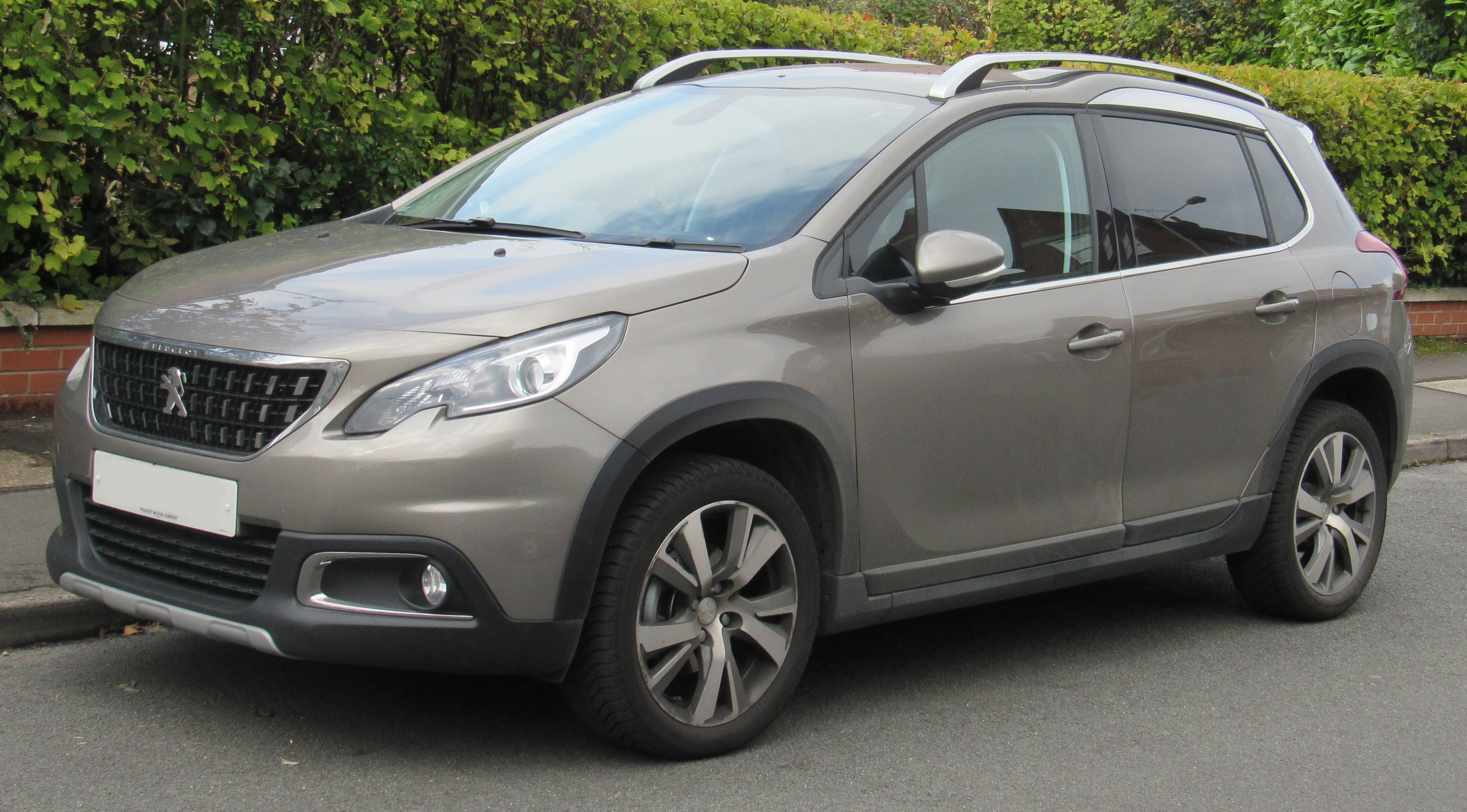
2017 Peugeot 2008 Allure (facelift, UK)

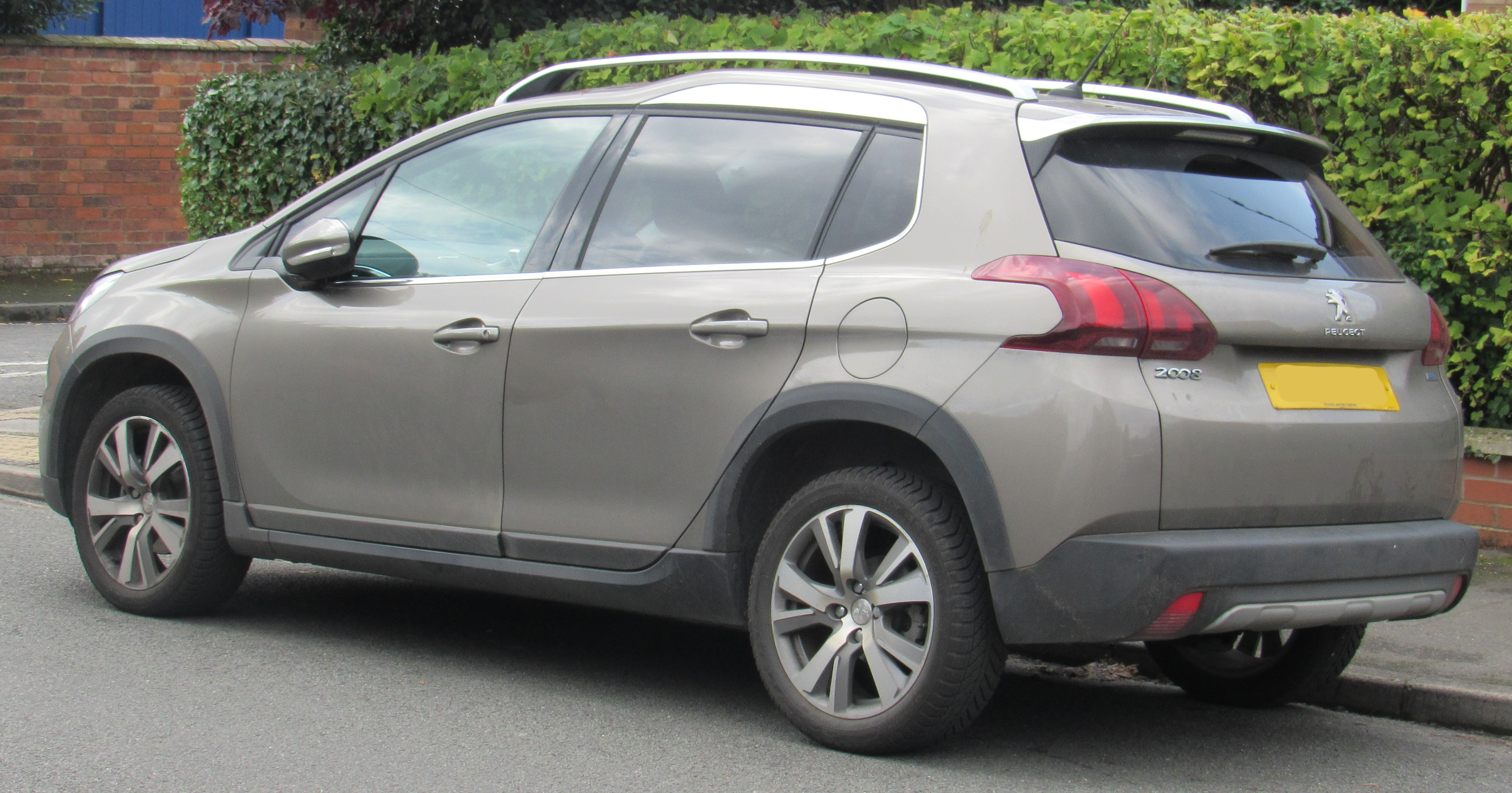
2017 Peugeot 2008 Allure (facelift, UK)

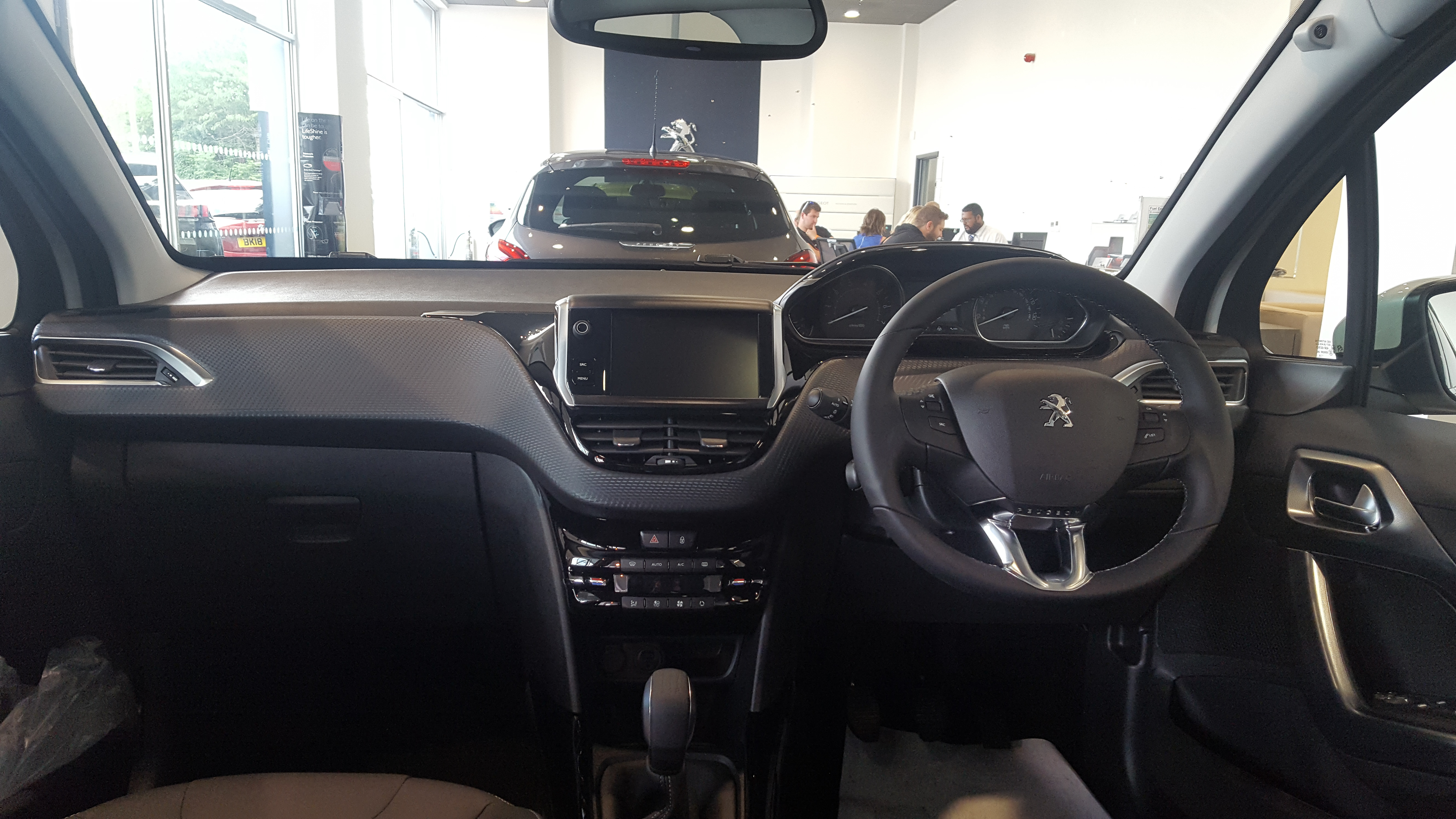
Interior

=== Brazilian facelift (2019) ===
In Brazil, the 2008 received a second facelift in 2019. The country's version of the 2008 was one of 16 new models scheduled to launch in Latin America in 2021. Since March 2015, the Peugeot 2008 is produced in Porto Real and exported to Mercosur countries.

In June 2022, the 2008 received a new two-tone option (roof, mirrors, part of the tailgate) for the 2023 model-year. Production in Brazil ended in November 2023, as the model was replaced by the second-generation, now manufactured in neighbouring Argentina.

=== Safety ===
ANCAP test results* Peugeot 2008 all variants (2013)
Test	Score
Overall	5 /5 stars
Frontal offset	14.22/16
Side impact	15.81/16
Pole	2/2
Seat belt reminders	2/3
Whiplash protection	Adequate
Pedestrian protection	Adequate
Electronic stability control	Standard

Euro NCAP test results* Peugeot 2008 1.2 VTi 'Active' (LHD) (2013)
Test	Points	%
Overall:	5 /5 stars	
Adult occupant:	31.8	88%
Child occupant:	38.2	77%
Pedestrian:	26.2	72%
Safety assist:	6.3	70%

== Second generation (P24; 2019) ==
Second generation
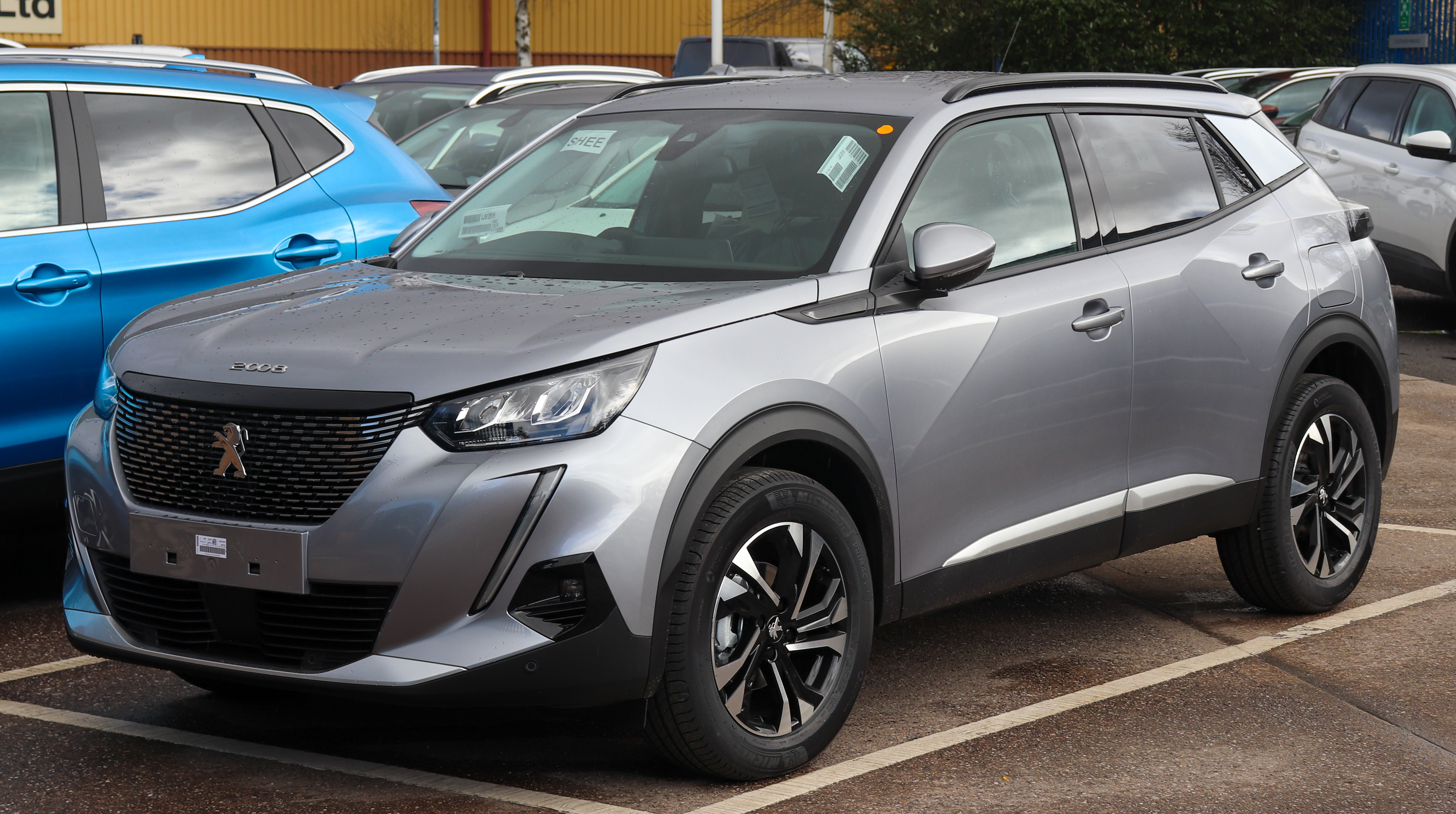
- 2020 Peugeot 2008 (UK)

Overview
- Model code: P24
- Production: 2019–present 2019–2024 (China); 2024–present (Argentina)
- Assembly: Spain: Vigo (Vigo Plant); Argentina: El Palomar; China: Wuhan (DPCA); Pakistan: Karachi (Lucky Motor Corporation); Malaysia: Gurun (Gurun Plant); Vietnam: Chu Lai (THACO)
- Designer: Sandeep Bhambra

Body and chassis
- Platform: CMP/eCMP
- Related: Peugeot 208 II; DS 3 II; Citroen C4 III; Opel Mokka B; Jeep Avenger; Fiat 600; Alfa Romeo Junior; Opel Corsa F; Lancia Ypsilon IV; IKCO Reera

Powertrain
- Engine: Petrol: 1.0 L FireFly I3 flex fuel (South America); 1.2 L EB2ADT Puretech turbo I3; Diesel: 1.5 L DV5 BlueHDi I4
- Electric motor: Permanent magnet synchronous motor (e-2008)
- Transmission: 6-speed manual 8-speed Aisin EAT8 automatic 1-speed direct-drive (e-2008)
- Battery: 50 kWh
- Electric range: 310 km (190 mi)

Dimensions
- Wheelbase: 2,605 mm (102.6 in); 2,612 mm (102.8 in) (China)
- Length: 4,300 mm (169.3 in); 4,312 mm (169.8 in) (China)
- Width: 1,815 mm (71.5 in)
- Height: 1,550 mm (61.0 in)

On June 19, 2019, Peugeot officially announced the second generation of the model, based on PSA's new Common Modular Platform (CMP) shared with other models of the PSA Group, such as the second generation 208, DS 3 Crossback and the Opel Corsa F.

=== ICE versions ===
At the time of release, Peugeot announced five internal combustion engine (ICE) options:

==== Petrol ====
- 1.2 L PureTech 100 S&S six-speed manual, or eight-speed automatic
- 1.2 L PureTech 130 S&S six-speed manual, six-speed automatic or eight-speed automatic
- 1.2 L PureTech 155 S&S eight-speed automatic (only for GT trim)

==== Diesel ====
- 1.5 L BlueHDi 100 S&S 6-speed manual
- 1.5 L BlueHDi 130 S&S 8-speed automatic
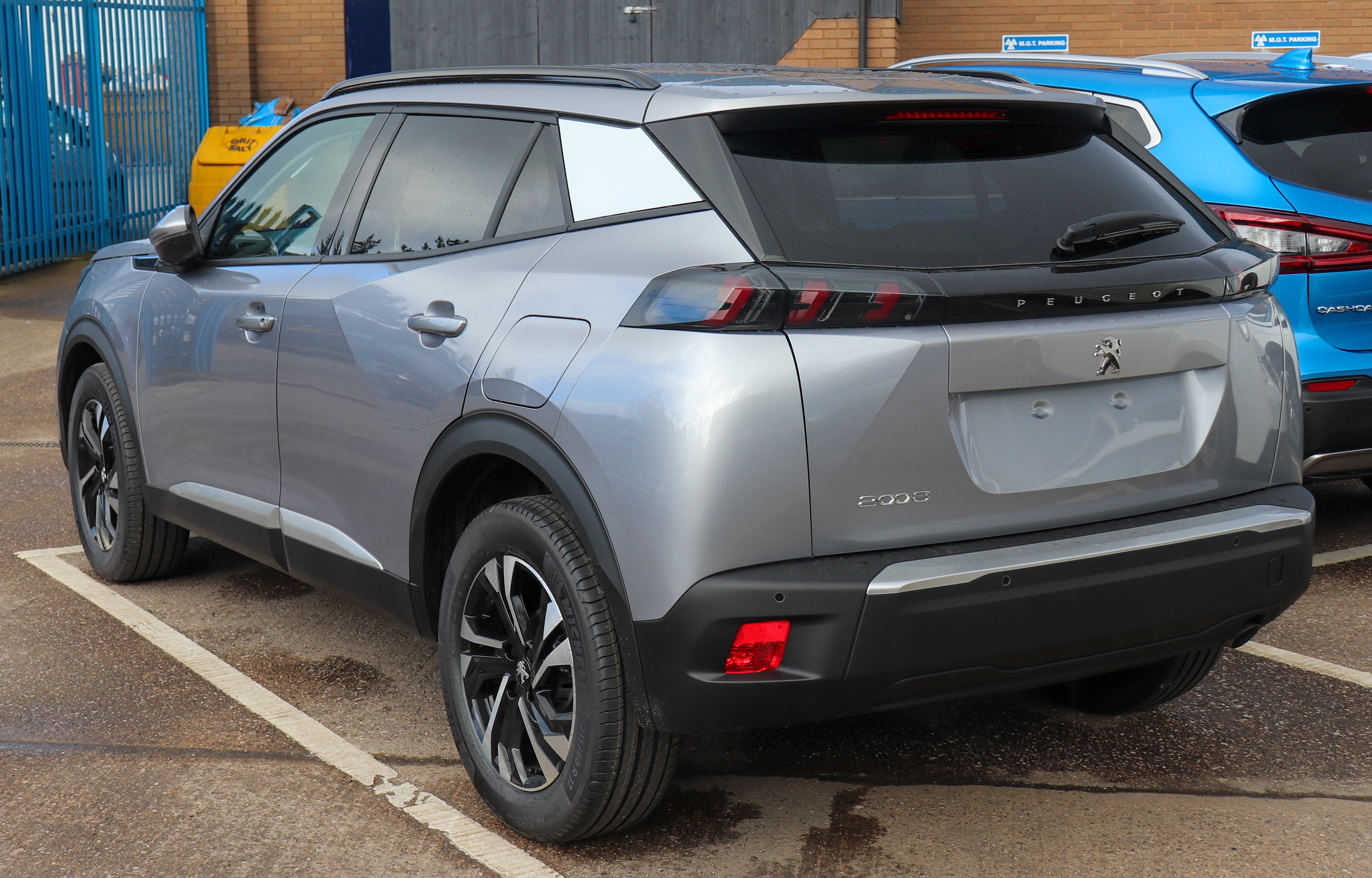
2008 (rear view)

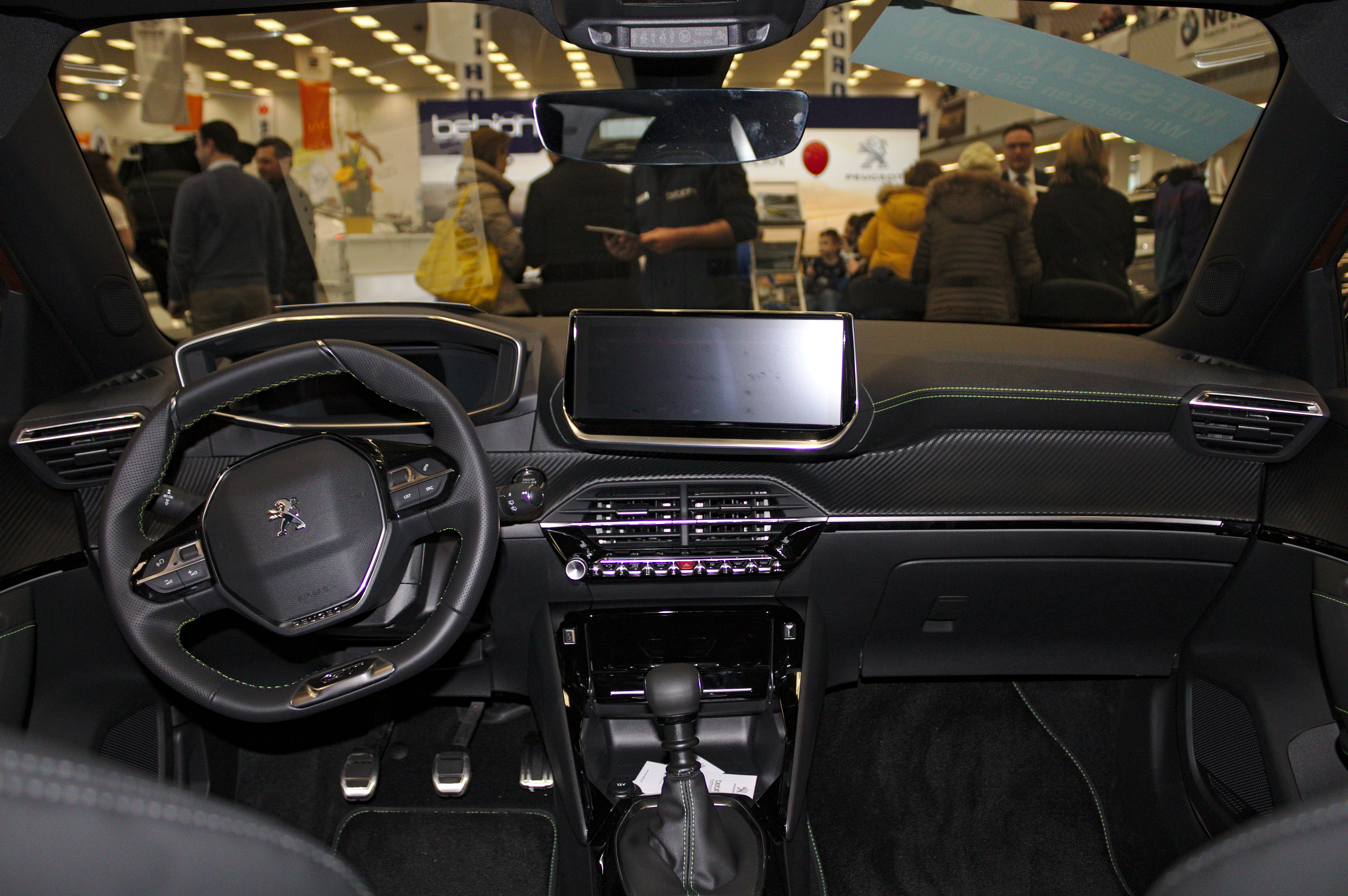
Interior

=== Electric version ===
The electric drive version, named the e-2008, features a 115 kW (156 PS; 154 hp) electric motor and 54 kWh battery, with a range of 406 km since the facelift in 2023. It previously featured a 100 kW (136 PS; 134 hp) electric motor and 46.2 kWh of usable battery (50 kWh in total), capable of 310 kilometres (193 miles) of range under the WLTP test.

The vehicle is able to charge at speeds up to 100 kW, if the charging station allows it. It went on sale in Europe in 2020.

The e-2008 is also sold in The Philippines, as it was launched there at 18th Manila International Auto Show in 2023.

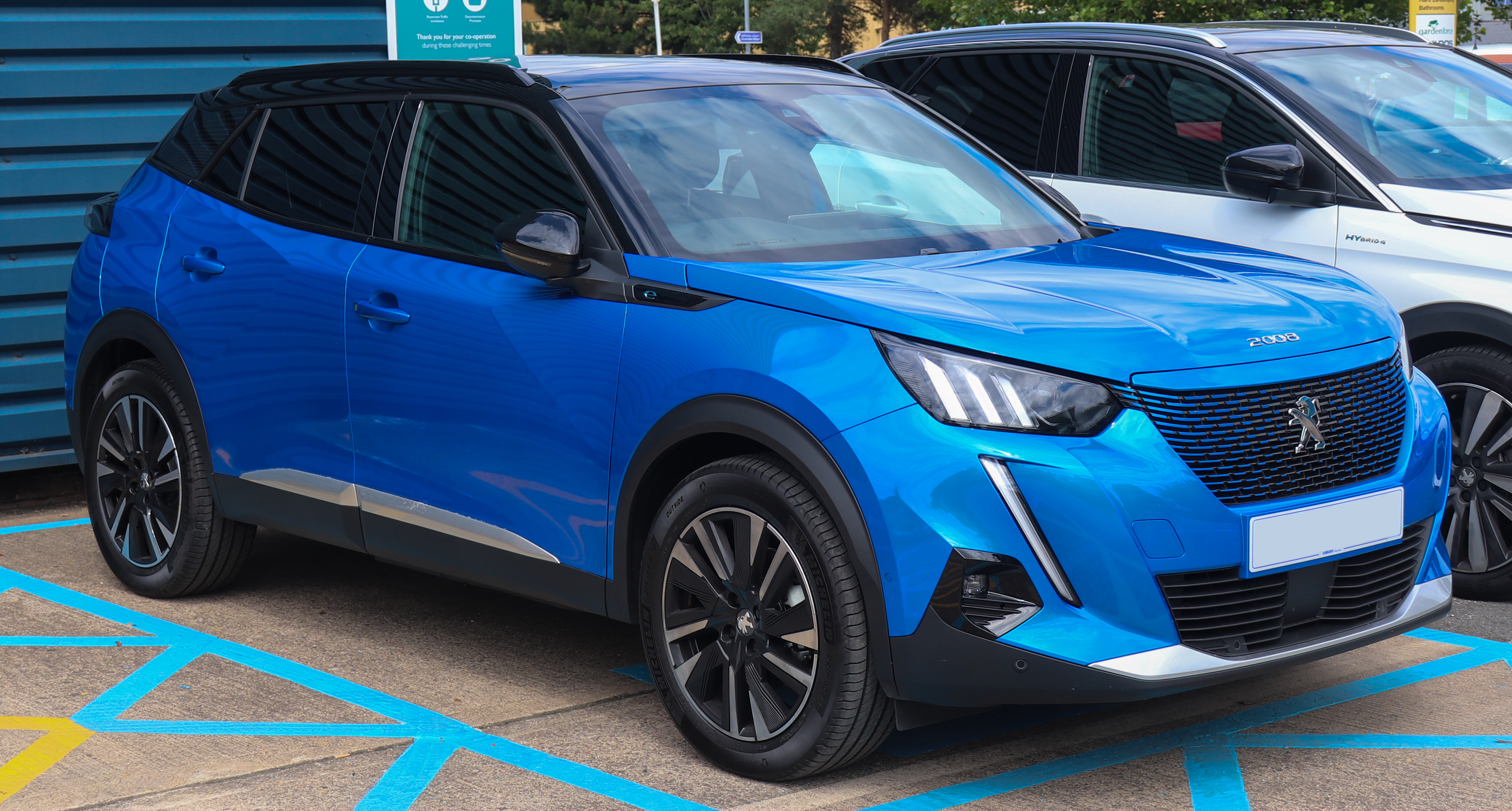
e-2008 (electric version)

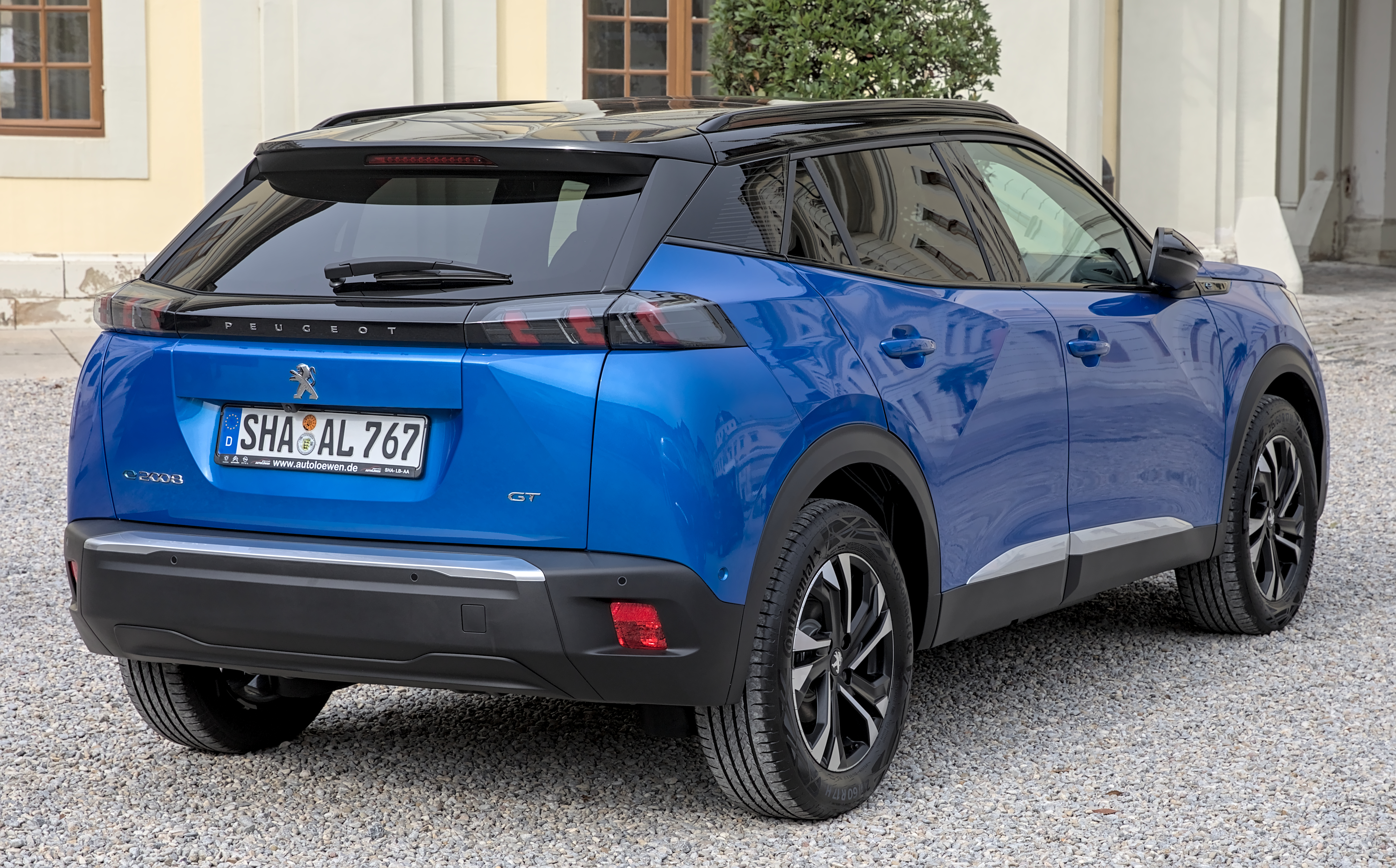
Rear view

=== Facelift (2023) ===
The facelift was officially unveiled on May 4, 2023, featuring visual changes and a larger battery for improved range.

The updated model has a new front end with new headlights, front apron and grille, while it receives new tail lights in the back. LED headlights and lights are now standard. The grille maintains its overall proportions but has new designs with body coloured elements (except for the base trim, on which it is always black) and the apron now incorporates three vertical lines as the new light signature and DRLs. New colours are available and the new Peugeot brand identity is now featured.

The facelift debuts a bigger 54 kWh battery and a new motor, which result in a range of 406 km, up from 345 km in the pre-facelift.

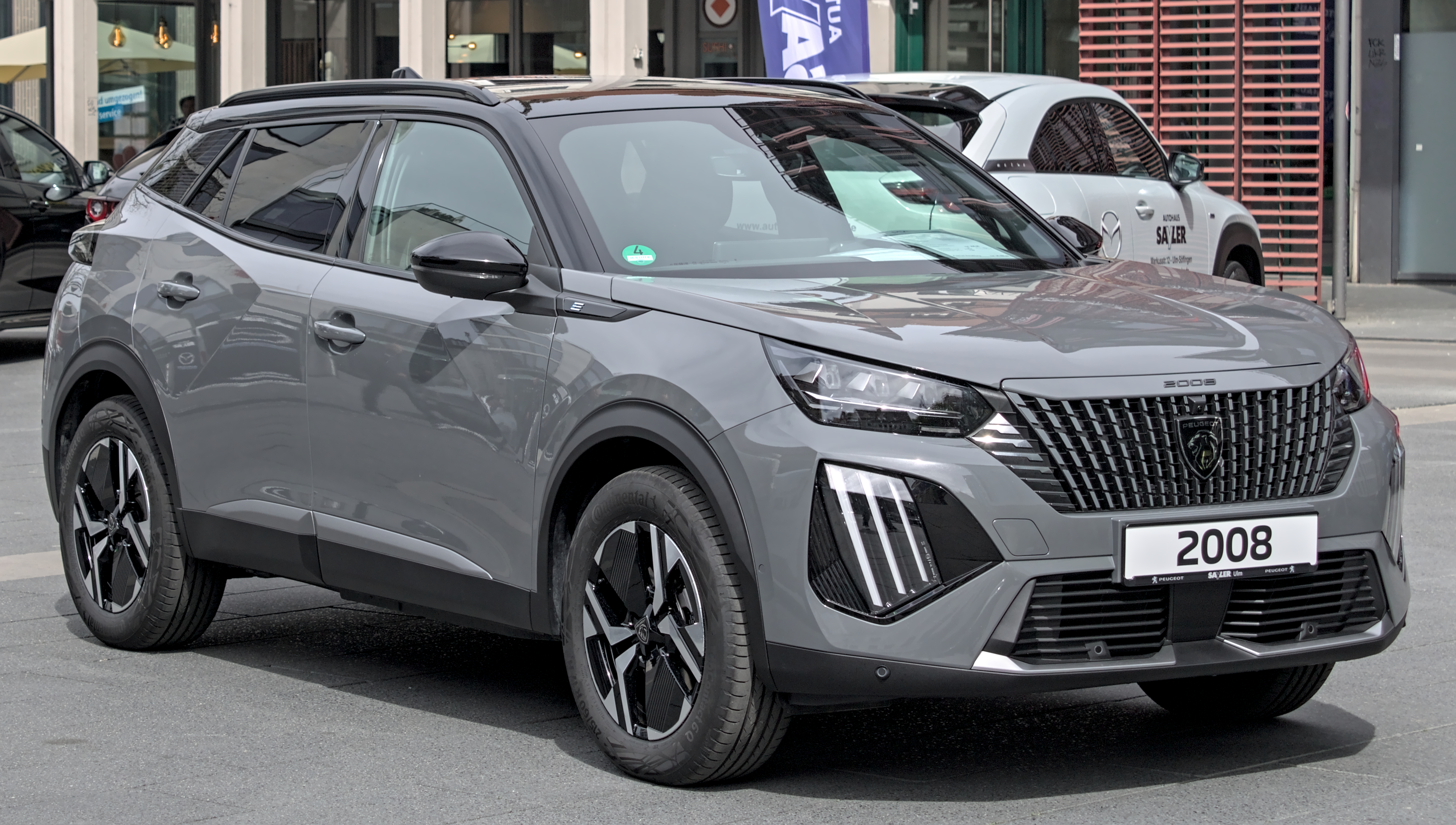
e-2008 (facelift)

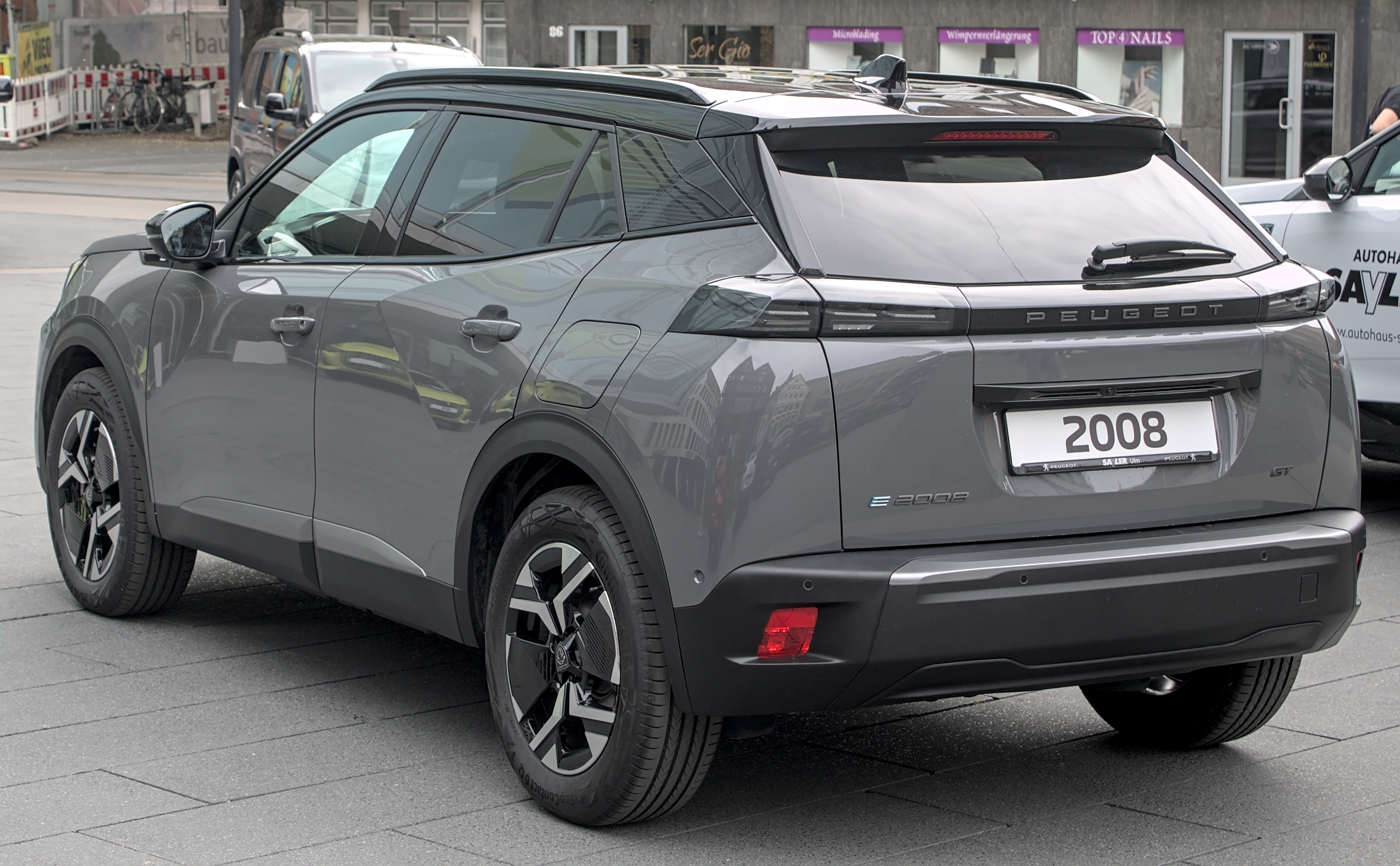
Rear view

=== Powertrain ===
Pre-facelift models (2019-2023)

Spec Model	Years	Type	Displacement	Power	Torque	0–100 km/h (0–62 mph)	Top speed	Trans.	Drive
Petrol engines
1.2 PureTech	2019-2023	1.2 L EB2ADT Puretech	1,199 cc (1.2 L; 73.2 cu in)	100 hp (75 kW) @ 5000	205 N⋅m (151 lb⋅ft) @ 1750	10.9 s	188 km/h (117 mph)	6-speed manual	FWD
1.2 PureTech	2019-2023	1.2 L EB2ADT Puretech	1,199 cc (1.2 L; 73.2 cu in)	130 hp (97 kW) @ 5500	230 N⋅m (170 lb⋅ft) @ 1750	8.9 s	198 km/h (123 mph)	6-speed manual	FWD
1.2 PureTech	2019-2023	1.2 L EB2ADT Puretech	1,199 cc (1.2 L; 73.2 cu in)	130 hp (97 kW) @ 5500	230 N⋅m (170 lb⋅ft) @ 1750	9.1 s	198 km/h (123 mph)	8-speed automatic	FWD
1.2 PureTech	2019-2022	1.2 L EB2ADT Puretech	1,199 cc (1.2 L; 73.2 cu in)	155 hp (116 kW) @ 5500	230 N⋅m (170 lb⋅ft) @ 1750	8.2 s	208 km/h (129 mph)	8-speed automatic	FWD
Diesel engines
1.5 BlueHDI	2019-2020	1.5 L DV5 BlueHDi	1,499 cc (1.5 L; 91.5 cu in)	100 hp (75 kW) @ 3500	250 N⋅m (180 lb⋅ft) @ 1750	11.4 s	180 km/h (110 mph)	6-speed manual	FWD
1.5 BlueHDI	2020-2022	1.5 L DV5 BlueHDi	1,499 cc (1.5 L; 91.5 cu in)	110 hp (82 kW) @ 3750	250 N⋅m (180 lb⋅ft) @ 1750	9.5 s	180 km/h (110 mph)	6-speed manual	FWD
1.5 BlueHDI	2019-2022	1.5 L DV5 BlueHDi	1,499 cc (1.5 L; 91.5 cu in)	130 hp (97 kW) @ 3700	300 N⋅m (220 lb⋅ft) @ 1750	9.3 s	195 km/h (121 mph)	8-speed automatic	FWD
Electric models
Model	Years	Battery	Trans.	Range (WLTP)	Power	Torque	0–100 km/h (0–62 mph)	Top speed	Drive
e-2008	2023—	50 kWh lithium-ion	1-speed direct-drive	330–342 km (205–213 mi)	136 hp (101 kW; 138 PS)	260 N⋅m (190 lb⋅ft)	10.8 s	183 km/h (114 mph)	FWD

Facelift models (2023-)

Internal combustion engines
Spec Model	Years	Type	Displacement	Power	Torque	0–100 km/h (0–62 mph)	Top speed	Trans.	Drive
Petrol engines
1.2 PureTech	2023—	1.2 L EB2ADT Puretech	1,199 cc (1.2 L; 73.2 cu in)	100 hp (75 kW) @ 5000	205 N⋅m (151 lb⋅ft) @ 1750	10.9 s	188 km/h (117 mph)	6-speed manual	FWD
1.2 PureTech	2023—	1.2 L EB2ADT Puretech	1,199 cc (1.2 L; 73.2 cu in)	130 hp (97 kW) @ 5500	230 N⋅m (170 lb⋅ft) @ 1750	9.4 s	203 km/h (126 mph)	8-speed automatic	FWD
Diesel engines
1.5 BlueHDI	2023—	1.5 L DV5 BlueHDi	1,499 cc (1.5 L; 91.5 cu in)	130 hp (97 kW) @ 3750	300 N⋅m (220 lb⋅ft) @ 1750	9.3 s	196 km/h (122 mph)	8-speed automatic	FWD
Electric models
Model	Years	Battery	Trans.	Range (WLTP)	Power	Torque	0–100 km/h (0–62 mph)	Top speed	Drive
e-2008	2024—	50 kWh lithium-ion	1-speed direct-drive	340 km (210 mi)	136 hp (101 kW; 138 PS)	260 N⋅m (190 lb⋅ft)	9.0 s	150 km/h (93 mph)	FWD
e-2008	2024—	54 kWh lithium-ion	1-speed direct-drive	406 km (252 mi)	156 hp (116 kW; 158 PS)	260 N⋅m (190 lb⋅ft)	9.1 s	150 km/h (93 mph)	FWD

=== Latin America ===
The second-generation 2008 is built at the El Palomar factory for the Argentine and Brazilian markets. The model began production in June 2024 and was launched in August 2024. It is offered with the Fiat-sourced FireFly 1.0L 120 PS (88 kW) turbo petrol engine and a continuously variable transmission.

=== Safety ===
==== ANCAP ====
ANCAP test results* Peugeot 2008 all petrol variants (2019, aligned with Euro NCAP)
Test	Points	%
Overall:	5 /5 stars	
Adult occupant:	35.4	93%
Child occupant:	42.8	87%
Pedestrian:	35.2	73%
Safety assist:	9.4	72%

==== Euro NCAP ====
Euro NCAP test results* Peugeot 2008 Allure 1.2 Puretech 130 (LHD) (2019)
Test	Points	%
Overall:	4 /5 stars	
Adult occupant:	34.7	91%
Child occupant:	41.4	84%
Pedestrian:	29.9	62%
Safety assist:	8.9	68%

==== Latin NCAP ====
The second generation 2008 in its most basic Latin American configuration with 4 airbags received 1 star from Latin NCAP 3.0 in 2025 (similar to Euro NCAP 2014).

Latin NCAP 3.5 test results Peugeot 2008 + 4 Airbags (2025, similar to Euro NCAP 2017)
Test	Points	%
Overall:	1 /5 stars	
Adult occupant:	16.86	42%
Child occupant:	29.01	59%
Pedestrian:	26.15	54%
Safety assist:	24.00	56%

== Awards ==
The Peugeot 2008 won the 2021 South African Car of the Year.

== Sales ==
Calendar year	Europe (Note: Europe: 2020 EU 27 + UK + Switzerland + Norway + Iceland)	Turkey	China	Brazil	Argentina	Mexico
2013	58,672					
2014	135,541		44,977			
2015	154,325		49,229	6,236		
2016	175,079		31,831	10,692	6,728	
2017	179,529		11,520	10,572	11,633	
2018	177,486		3,417	9,745	10,062	381
2019	164,951		838	8,693	5,280	340
2020	156,138	11,762	1,097	4,602	3,971	1,159
2021	191,424	9,176	7,268	7,747	2,957	2,216
2022	141,471	6,703		5,172	2,367	2,142
2023		18,005	1,885	1,728		3,220
2024		18,612	470	7,872		
2025		22,341	348	11,317		

== IKCO Reera ==
In 2022, Iran Khodro Company (IKCO) unveiled the Reera, which shares platforms with the second generation Peugeot 2008. This car is produced with the petrol engines, expected to be released in 2024, along with an electric version in 2025.

The petrol model uses the EFP (1.65 16V TC Dual VVT-i) which is capable of producing 161 horsepower and 240 Nm of torque. Reera's gearbox is a 6-speed automatic (AT) produced by DAE, which transfers power to the Reera's front wheels.

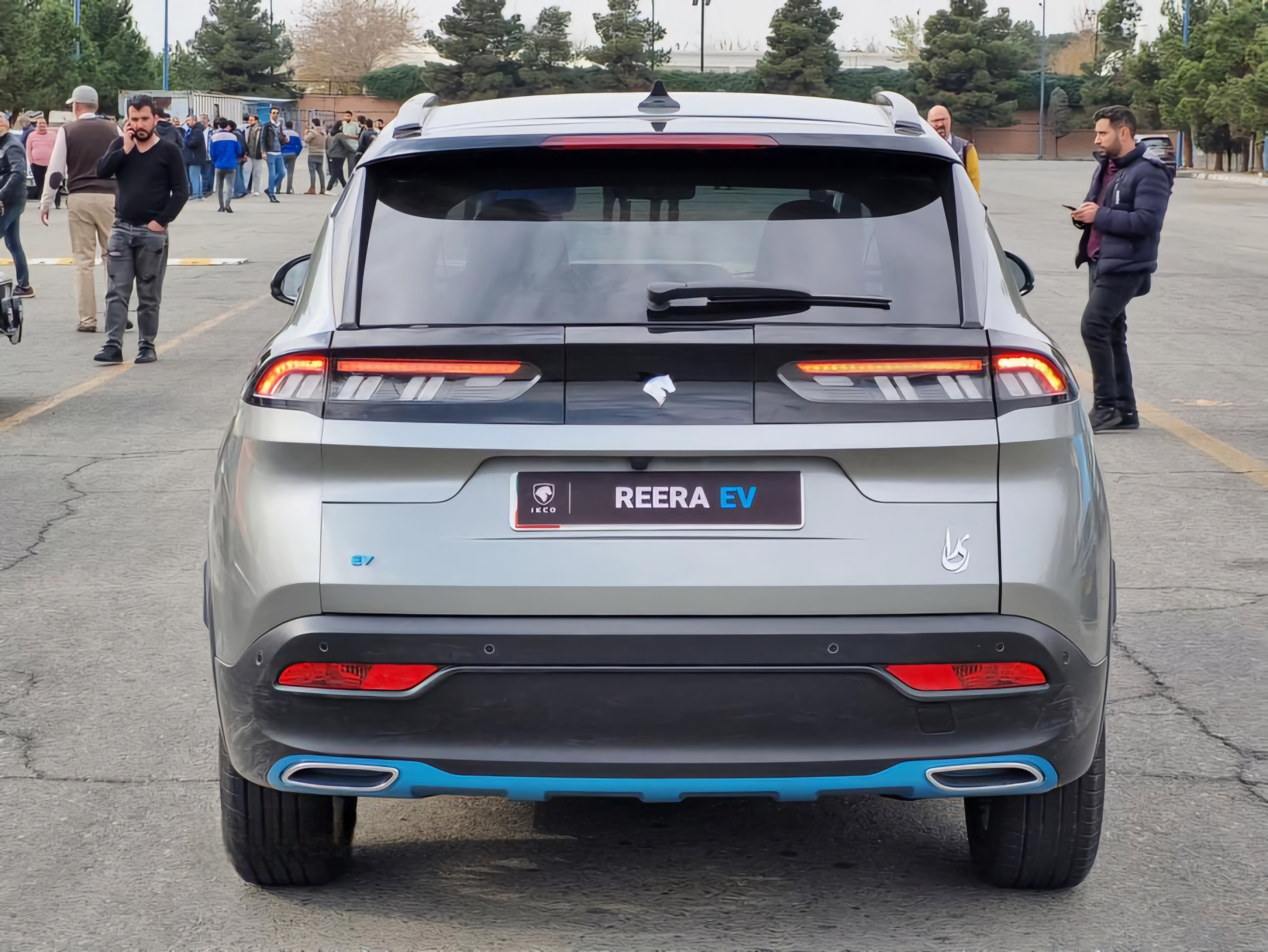
IKCO Reera EV (Rear view, electric model)

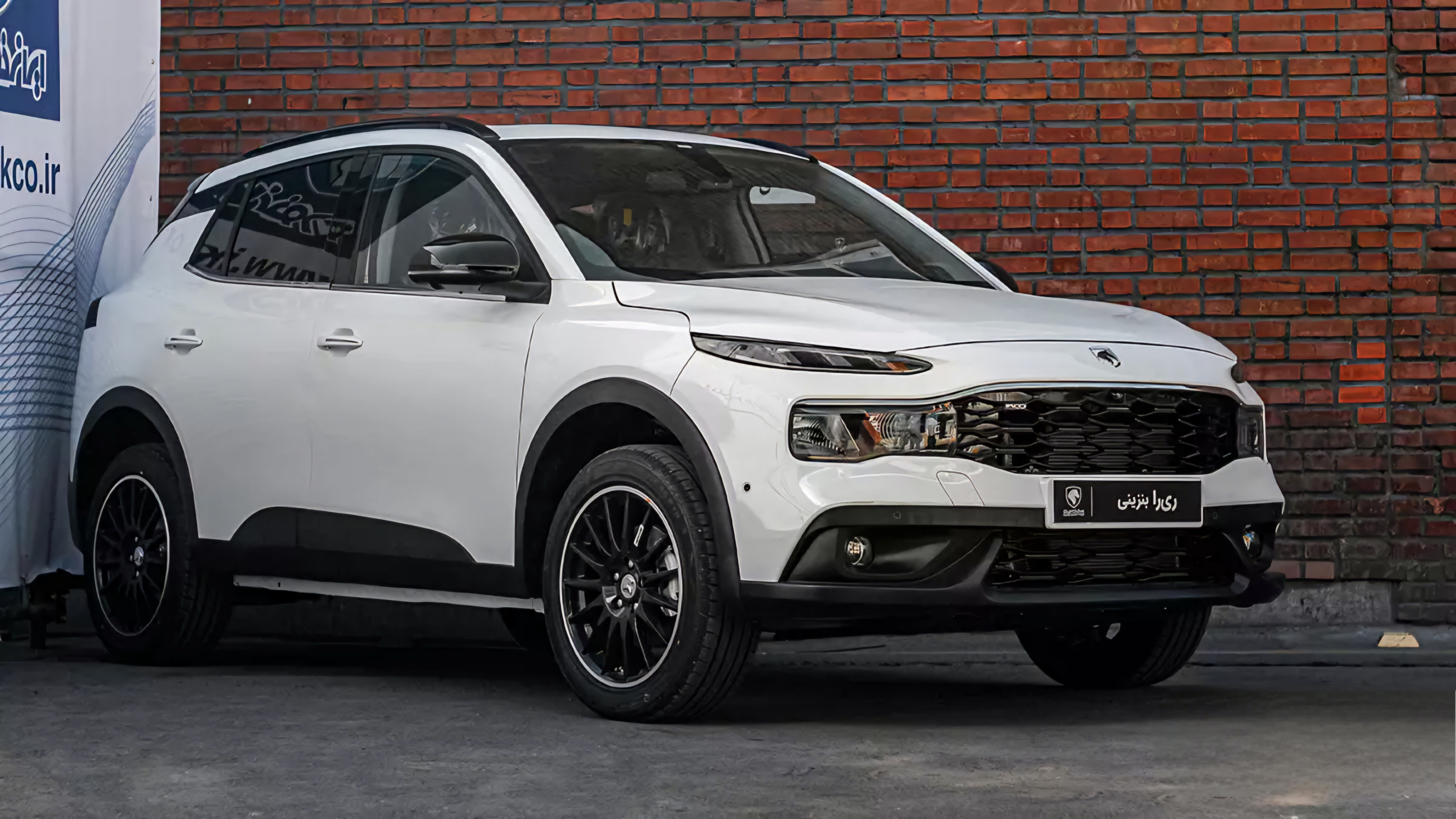
IKCO Reera (Front view, petrol model)
