= Mark O'Dea =

British television presenter (born 1991)

- Born: 1 June 1991 (age 35); Gravesend, Kent, England
- Occupations: Television presenter, actor
- Years active: 2011–present

Mark O'Dea (born 1 June 1991) is a British television presenter and YouTuber, mainly known for his work in Malaysia.

== Early life ==
O'Dea was born in Gravesend, Kent. He was cast in his first theatre role at the age of eleven in the West End production of Chitty Chitty Bang Bang at the London Palladium. He was awarded a scholarship to the Sylvia Young Theatre School at the age of twelve.

== Career ==
After graduating from the Sylvia Young Theatre School, O'Dea moved to Malaysia where he joined the Malaysian-based boyband The London Boys and at the same time started a YouTube channel which included pranks, sketches, song covers and challenges.

Following The London Boys, O'Dea joined The 8TV Quickie variety show in 2014 as a regular presenter. The show ended on 31 March 2016. He also worked for Astro SuperSport, hosting a travelogue sports show called 'Wishlist', a show focused on Malaysian athletes that he co-hosted with Reem Shahwa.

O'Dea is also a fitness enthusiast and was on the cover for the Malaysia Men's Health Magazine in May 2015. He has made several videos and articles about equal religious rights in Malaysia.

In 2016, he launched a Challenge Series on his YouTube channel called 'Oh My Bahasa Malaysia' where he would face up against Malaysian celebrities and try to compete in a series of challenges to avoid a punishment.

== Filmography ==
Film
| Year | Title | Role | Notes | Ref. |
|---|---|---|---|---|
| 2018 | Rise: Ini Kalilah | Marcus | | |
| 2021 | Siapa Tutup Lampu | Aaron | | |
| 2023 | Pulau | Hero | | |
