= Sarah Tan =

British Channel V VJ and a 987FM DJ (born 1980)

Sarah Tan (born 1 August 1980 in the United Kingdom) is a British model. Tan was also formerly a Channel [V] video jockey and a disc jockey on 987FM, a Singapore radio station.

== Early life and education ==
Tan's father is a Malaysian Chinese and her mother is English. She has two younger sisters, Kathryn and Laura. She attended an all-girls boarding school in Shropshire, England, when she was 13. Several years later, she returned to Singapore to finish high school at the United World College of South East Asia. Later, she enrolled in the University of Surrey and graduated with a degree in English literature.

== Career ==
Tan previously worked as a bartender and a shop assistant at Chanel. She began her modeling career when she was 16 with Elite Models Singapore agency. Tan landed a VJ spot on Channel [V] International via the agency. Tan also hosted a dating show called A Light Affair, on Singapore's Mediacorp Channel 5. She also hosted Spellcast on Okto. As a model, she has been the cover girl for various magazines such as Flirt, Seventeen, Her World and in Malaysia's Newtide and Female, as well as Singapore's Newman magazine.

In 2005, Tan signed with modelling agency Mannequin Studio and moved to Hong Kong for modelling jobs.

Tan is currently affiliated to 3 different modeling agencies; one in Singapore, one in Thailand, and the last one in Hong Kong. Tan was voted fifth-sexiest woman in Asia FHM's 100 Sexiest Women in the World for 2003 and third-sexiest woman in Asia FHM's 100 Sexiest Women in the World for 2004.

== Personal life ==
Tan is a Singapore permanent citizen.

Tan is married to Soo Kui Jien, another host of TV show A Light Affair. They tied the knot on 21 December 2007 after being in a relationship for two and a half years. The ceremony took place in Bali, Indonesia.

In April 2008, she gave birth to a son named Dylan Robert Soo. In March 2010, she joined 987FM and begun hosting a weekday lunchtime show. in 2014 she gave birth to a pair of twins, a boy and a girl.
