= Soo Kui Jien =

Malaysian television personality

- Born: 31 August 1972 (age 52)
- Occupation: Television personality
- Spouse: Sarah Tan (2007-present)
- Children: Dylan Robert Soo

Chinese name
- Traditional Chinese: 蘇桂健
- Simplified Chinese: 苏桂健
Transcriptions
Standard Mandarin
- Hanyu Pinyin: Sū Guìjiàn
Yue: Cantonese
- Jyutping: Sou1 Gwai3 Gin6
Southern Min
- Hokkien POJ: So͘ Kùi-kiān
- Tâi-lô: Soo Kuì-kiān

Soo Kui Jien (simplified Chinese: 苏桂健; traditional Chinese: 蘇桂健; pinyin: Sū Guìjiàn; Jyutping: Sou1 Gwai3 Gin6; Pe̍h-ōe-jī: So͘ Kùi-kiān; born 31 August 1972), is a Malaysian television personality.

== Biography ==
Better known as Handsome Jien, Jien got his big break when he became a host on the Disney Channel in 1997. He has worked as an emcee and host on television in Hong Kong, Manila, Singapore and Malaysia. He has also acted in a few TV series shown on Singapore and Malaysian TV channels. Jien is based between Kuala Lumpur and ESPN’s studio in Singapore. He was the host of the television show Malaysian Idol, and also the first Asian Idol held in Indonesia. He is 5' 9" tall.

He also regularly appears on sports programmes for ESPN or ESPN Star Sports. These programmes include Nokia Football Crazy and Top Corner.

Soo married Channel [V] VJ Sarah Tan on 21 December 2007. In April 2008, his wife gave birth to a son named Dylan Robert Soo. In 2014 they welcomed a pair of twins, a boy and a girl.
