= Naza (company) =

Malaysian business conglomerate

Naza Group of Companies
- Type: Privately held company
- Industry: Conglomerate
- Founded: 1975
- Founders: Tan Sri SM Nasimuddin SM Amin; Puan Sri Zaleha Ismail
- Headquarters: Kuala Lumpur, Malaysia
- Area served: Southeast Asia
- Key people: Puan Sri Zaleha Ismail (Co-founder & Director); SM Nasarudin SM Nasimuddin (Group Chairman); SM Faliq SM Nasimuddin (Deputy Group Chairman); Nur Diana SM Nasimuddin (Executive Director); Nur Nadia SM Nasimuddin (Executive Director)
- Number of employees: 5,000
- Website: www.naza.com.my

The Naza Group of Companies is a Malaysian business conglomerate involved in many types of businesses, ranging from motoring to education. The group began operations in 1975 as a motor trading company. The motoring sector remains the most important sector for the group.

The group has business divisions including vehicle and bike distribution, motor-trading, manufacturing, property development, food and beverage, hospitality, transportation services, limousine services, automotive education, plantations, cigarette distribution, and non-financial services. The group was founded and led by Malaysian business tycoon Tan Sri SM Nasimuddin SM Amin until his death on May 1, 2008.

Naza Group is the franchise holder for Ferrari, Maserati, Koenigsegg, Kia Motors, Peugeot, Chevrolet, Citroën, Brabus, Ducati, Harley-Davidson, Piaggio, Vespa, Aprilia, Gilera and Indian Motorcycle brands in Malaysia.

Naza has marketed rebadged versions of Kia's Carnival, Carens, and Picanto vehicles as Naza Ria, Naza Citra, and Naza Suria respectively, for the Malaysian market. In April 2006, Naza developed the Naza Sutera based on Hafei Lobo. It was joined by a Naza-badged version of the Peugeot 206 called the Naza 206 Bestari in May 2006, and a Naza-badged version of the Kia Picanto called the Naza Picanto in November 2006.

== History ==
=== Early years ===
The Naza Group of Companies began with the establishment of Naza Motor Trading Sdn Bhd in 1975 as an importer of used and reconditioned cars in Malaysia by the late Tan Sri SM Nasimuddin SM Amin. At just 21, he used his savings, earned from helping his father's construction business, to import used Japanese vehicles.

After selling off his entire stock within three months, Tan Sri SM Nasimuddin began a dealership for used luxury vehicles in Kuala Lumpur. Within several years, the group established itself as a major dealer of used luxury vehicles in Malaysia. The group also included the importation of used luxury bikes.

=== 1990 to 1999 ===
By the late 90s, the Naza Group expanded its business to include automotive distribution after achieving its first franchise from a South Korean carmaker, Kia Motors Corp.

Part of Naza Group of Companies, Naza Hotel Management was born. Under the late Tan Sri SM Nasimuddin, the Naza Group also ventured into the hotel management industry. In the late 90s, it acquired the Crowne Plaza Los Angeles Harbor Hotel and the Howard Johnson Inn Torrance.

=== 2000 to 2009 ===
In 2000, the Naza Group's extended its portfolio to include the distribution of motorcycles after being appointed as the exclusive distributor for the Ducati brand in Malaysia.

By 2001, the Naza Group became an auto assembler with the introduction of the Kia Spectra. Several locally-assembled Kia models that were subsequently launched such as the Naza Ria MPV, the Sorento, and the Sportage which became market leaders in their respective segments. In the same year, the Naza Group captured its second franchise after it was appointed as the exclusive distributor of Brabus-tuned cars.

In 2002, the Naza Group acquired hotels in Penang, Melaka, and Johor Bahru. These three hotels were later re-branded under the name, Naza Talyya Hotels, in 2010. Naza Talyya Hotel closed its operation in Johor and to date only two Naza Talyya Hotels remain in operation in Penang and Melaka.

With demand for locally-assembled Kias increasing, the Naza Group started construction works on an in house automotive manufacturing facility in Gurun, Kedah in September 2002. In 2003, the Naza Group commenced operations of an RM30 million motorcycle manufacturing plant in Shah Alam, Selangor to assemble a wide range of bikes including scooters and superbikes.

By May 2003, the RM500 million manufacturing facility in Gurun- known as Naza Automotive Manufacturing (NAM) – commenced operations producing a Naza Ria MPV. It has a workforce of close to 450 people and has a production capacity of 50,000 units per annum.

The group's foray into manufacturing into NAM also led to the launch of the Naza 206 Bestari, which was the result of a joint venture with Automobiles Peugeot, and the group's first-ever car, the Naza Sutera in 2006.

In 2004, current shareholder Ekspedisi Nikmat Sdn Bhd helmed by Naza Group late chairman Tan Sri Dato' Seri Utama SM Nasimuddin SM Amin, acquired TTDI from Danaharta.

TTDI is now the main property arm of the Naza Group of companies. TTDI development changed its name to Naza TTDI Sdn Bhd on 11 March 2008 to reflect its association with the NAZA Group. The Naza Group is an established player in the property development market through its subsidiary, Naza TTDI, which is best known for the development of the acclaimed township of Taman Tun Dr. Ismail in Kuala Lumpur.

At the same time, the Naza Group began to rapidly expand its motor-trading business. In 2005, it launched the Naza Auto Mall in Petaling Jaya, Selangor, which is the largest motor showroom in Malaysia. With a built-up area of 250,414 square feet and the capacity to display 2,000 cars, the Naza Auto Mall symbolized the group's status as the largest importer of used and re-conditioned luxury and high-end vehicles in Malaysia. Naza Auto Mall and has won a mention in the Malaysia Book of Records for being the largest motor showroom in the country.

The group has also had a strong commitment to the field of education. In 2006, the group established the Naza Kia Academy (NKA) by its manufacturing facility in Gurun, Kedah. NKA offers sales and after-sales training to all employees of the Naza Group particularly in developmental and technical-related programs. The academy is also recognized by Kia Motors as its overseas training center in the Asia Pacific region.

In 2008, the group added more brands to its portfolio. In January, it was appointed the sole distributor for the Peugeot brand followed by Ferrari in April and Harley-Davidson in October. By 2009, it added the Italian luxury brand, Maserati, to its portfolio.

As the distributor for Peugeot vehicles in Malaysia, the Naza Group began assembling Peugeots at NAM in Gurun. By that time, vehicles produced at Gurun were also being exported to neighboring countries in ASEAN which established the group's credentials as a manufacturer that could meet international standards.

The Naza Group entered the food and beverage industry in 2008 after capturing the Bubba Gump Shrimp Company franchise. In 2009, Naza Kia Academy began offering executive diplomas in automotive management and executive diploma in manufacturing management process programs. These diploma programs were offered in collaboration with the UK's Society of Business Practitioners. In that same year, the Naza Group signed a collaboration agreement with US-based Motorola University to offer executive development programs to the group's employees.

In 2009, it expanded its food and beverage portfolio to include the Tutti Frutti Frozen Yogurt brand. The group became the master license holder for the franchise in Malaysia, Singapore, Cambodia, Brunei, and Thailand. It currently has over 100 outlets in Malaysia as well as outlets in Singapore, Cambodia, Brunei, and Thailand.

=== 2010 to present ===
In 2010, Automobiles Peugeot announced it would partner the Naza Group in establishing a manufacturing hub for the former at the latter's plant in Gurun for right-hand drive markets in the ASEAN region. The announcement marked the first time a foreign carmaker had chosen to make Malaysia its hub for the region.

2010 was another active year for the group as it added several more brands to its stable. In March, it won the exclusive rights to distribute the Chevrolet brand in Malaysia from General Motors.

By May, it expanded its motorcycle division by agreeing with the Piaggio Group. Under the agreement, the Naza Group was given exclusive rights to distribute the Piaggio, Aprilia, Vespa, and Gilera brands in Malaysia.

In 2011, the Naza Group added another brand to its stable: Indian Motorcycle. With Indian Motorcycle, the Naza Group became a premium player in the big bikes market in Malaysia. It has also cemented the group's position as one of the largest bike importers and distributors in Malaysia.

The Naza Group entered into a joint venture with HELP International Corporation Bhd to establish a college of automotive and transportation management in Malaysia. The joint venture, which has been named, College of Automotive Transportation (CATM), is targeting to launch campuses in Gurun and Selayang, Selangor in 2012. NKA's facility in Gurun will serve as CATM's campus there. Among the courses to be offered include Diploma in Automotive Technology and a Diploma in Motorsport Technology.

The Naza Group expanded its F&B portfolio to include Gyu Kaku, a globally renowned yakiniku restaurant chain.

In 2013, the Naza Group announced that its subsidiary, Naza Euro Motors, had been appointed as the official distributor for the Citroën brand in Malaysia. Through the appointment, the Naza Group now represents both major brands of the PSA Peugeot Citroën group in Malaysia.

To-date, Naza TTDI has completed over 14,000 residential and commercial units and has developed the RM4 billion Platinum Park, an integrated residential and commercial development in the Kuala Lumpur City Centre. The company is also constructing the RM20 billion KL Metropolis development which will comprise the MATRADE, MITEC, MITI Tower, Naza Signature Tower, office towers, residential buildings, luxury hotels, as well as retail malls. Naza TTDI had also developed the Malaysia International Trade and Exhibition Centre (MITEC) in KL Metropolis, the country’s largest exhibition centre with 1 million square feet of exhibition space, which was then delivered to the Malaysian Government in 2017.

In 2018, the Naza Group and Groupe PSA signed a share sale agreement and a joint venture agreement to make NAM the first manufacturing hub in ASEAN for the French carmaker, acquiring a 56% stake in the Kedah facility. A joint statement released by the Groups said, "The Naza Group will have sole responsibility for the distribution of Peugeot, Citroen and DS Automobiles in the domestic market and, with PSA, will explore distribution prospects in other ASEAN markets."

== Businesses divisions ==
=== Four-wheeled ===
A Ferrari Enzo in Naza World

- Naza Motor Trading Sdn Bhd (Importer of luxury and high-end vehicles)
- Naza Italia Sdn Bhd (Ferrari and Maserati distributor)
- Naza Swedish Motors Sdn Bhd (Koenigsegg distributor)
- Naza Kia Malaysia Sdn Bhd (Kia distributor)
- Nasim Sdn Bhd (Peugeot distributor)
- Naza Quest Sdn Bhd (Chevrolet distributor)
- Naza-Brabus Motor Sdn Bhd (Brabus-tuned cars distributor)
- Naza Corporation Sdn Bhd (Naza cars distributor)
- NZ Wheels Sdn Bhd (Mercedes-Benz dealership)
- Naza Wheels Sdn Bhd (Chevrolet dealership)
- Naza Quest Auto Sdn Bhd (Chevrolet dealership)
- Naza Mekar Sdn Bhd (Perodua dealership)

=== Two-wheeled ===
- Next Bike Sdn Bhd (Ducati distributor)
- Naza Prestige Bikes Sdn Bhd (Harley-Davidson distributor)
- Naza Premira Sdn Bhd (Piaggio, Vespa, Aprilia and Gilera distributor)
- Harmony Fabulous Sdn Bhd (Indian & Victory Motorcycle distributor)
- Naza Bikers Dream Sdn Bhd (Importer of high-end bikes)
- Naza Bikers Sales and Distribution Sdn Bhd (Naza Bikes distributor)

=== Manufacturing ===
- Naza Automotive Manufacturing Sdn Bhd (Manufacturing arm, previously produced Kia, Peugeot and Citroën models, sold in 2018 to PSA Group)
- Naza Bikes Sdn Bhd (Manufacturing arm, producing Hyosung bikes) such as the Naza N5/N5R

=== Property ===
- Naza TTDI Sdn Bhd
- Naza Engineering and Construction Sdn Bhd

=== Hospitality ===
- Naza Hotel Management Sdn Bhd

=== Food and beverages ===
- NZ Diners Sdn Bhd (Franchise holder for Bubba Gump Shrimp Co chain in Malaysia)
- Autumn Odyssey Sdn Bhd (Franchise holder for Gyu-Kaku Japanese BBQ chain in Malaysia)
- Naza Tutti Frutti (Malaysia) Sdn Bhd (Master license holder for the Tutti Frutti Frozen Yogurt chain in Malaysia, Singapore, Cambodia, Brunei, and Thailand)

=== Research and education ===
- Naza KIA Academy Sdn Bhd (Regional KIA training center for Asia Pacific region)
- Naza Education Sdn Bhd (JV Company with Help International Corporation Berhad)
- Naza Auto Solutions Sdn Bhd (Automotive design, producing cars accessories & parts)

=== Transportation and logistics ===
- Naza Ventures Holdings Sdn Bhd (Chauffeured Limousine)

Started year 2007 - Ended year 2021.

- Naza Transport Sdn Bhd (Total logistics services)
- Zalnas Limousine Sdn. Bhd (Airport Limo & Taxi services)

=== Diversified ===
- NZ Galaxy Sdn Bhd (Retail cars accessories & parts)
- Naza Credit & Leasing Sdn Bhd (Vehicles Financing)
- Naza Coverage Sdn Bhd (Insurance Agent)
- Zalnas Coverage Sdn Bhd (Insurance Agent)
- Wood Vision Sdn Bhd (Plantation)
- Bahau Cigarette Distributors Sdn Bhd (Cigarette Distribution)
- Asas Sejati Sdn Bhd (Cigarette Distribution)

== Community ==
=== Corporate social responsibility ===
Today, the group's CSR programs include donations and sponsorship to healthcare organizations, palliative care providers, orphanages, natural disaster funds, educational programs and initiatives, the local arts and sporting activities.

=== Tan Sri SM Nasimuddin Foundation ===
Yayasan Tan Sri SM Nasimuddin is a Company Limited by Guarantee. Incorporated on 16 March 2011, the Yayasan was established in honor of the late Tan Sri SM Nasimuddin, the founder of Naza Group, to provide financial aid in the form of educational scholarships, schooling assistance, and donations to support charitable organizations. It strives to raise funds through various means including donations and strategic fund-raising activities.

== Automotive manufacturing ==
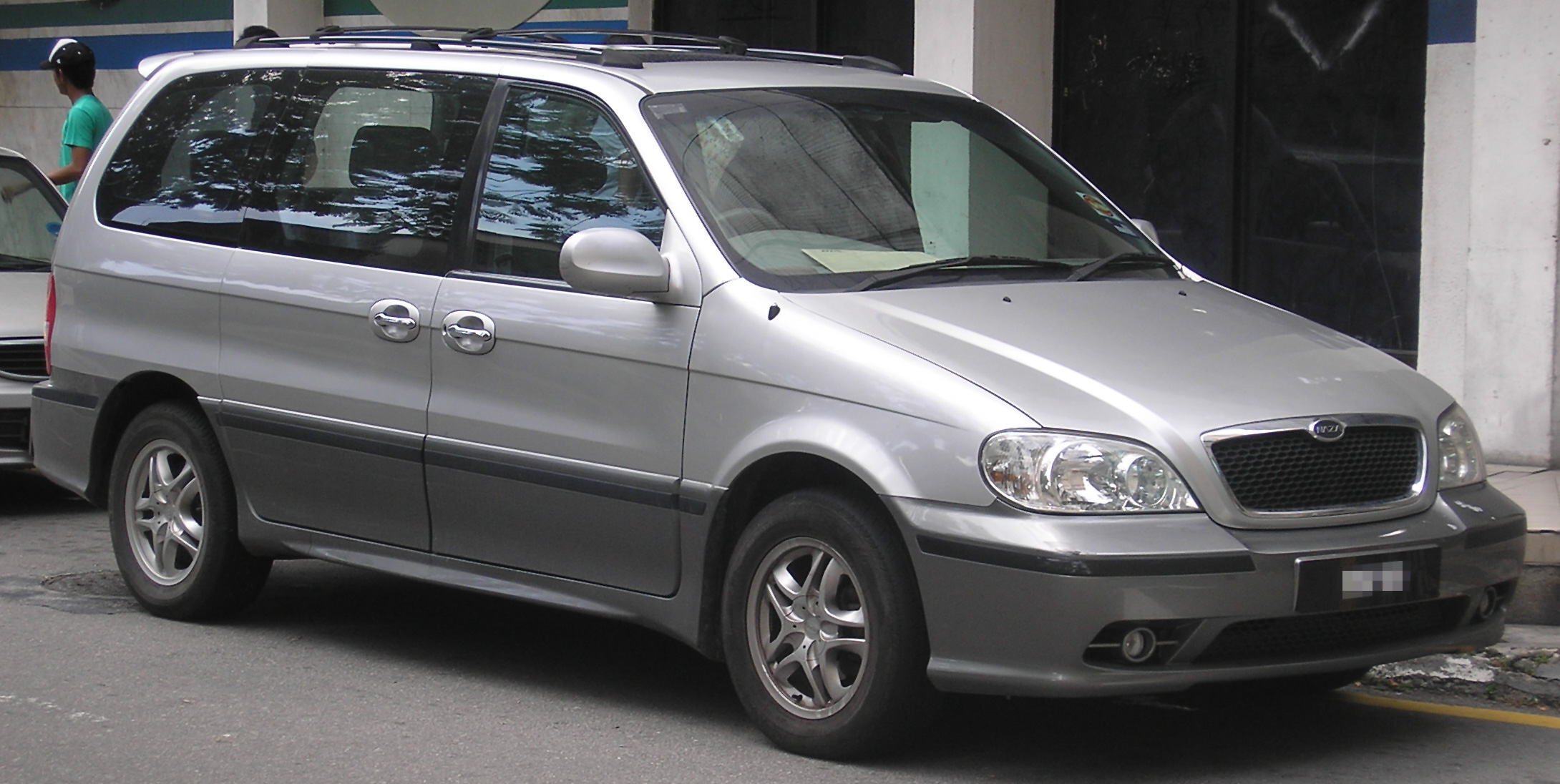
Naza Ria

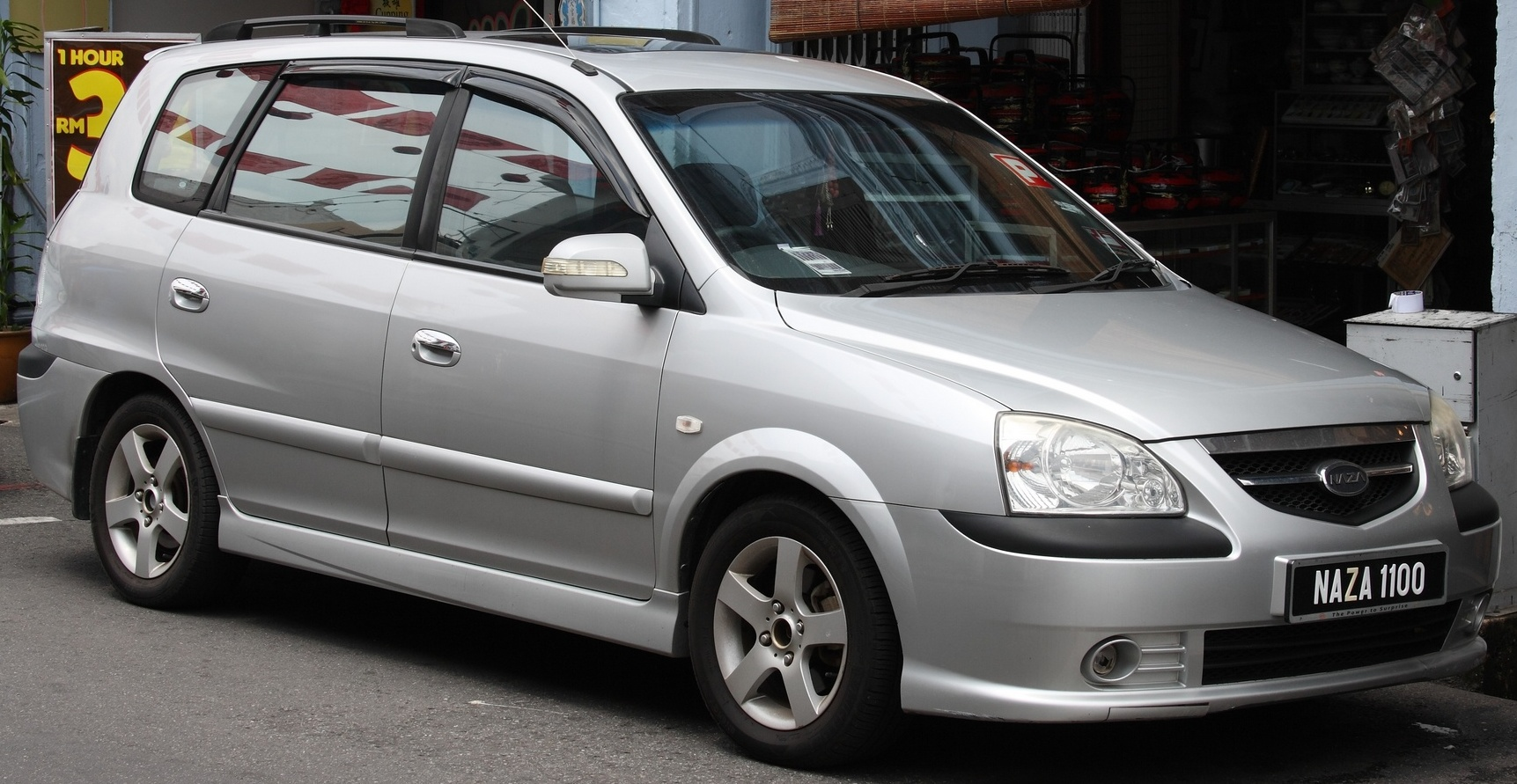
Naza Citra

- Naza Ria (rebadged Kia Carnival)
- Naza Citra (rebadged first generation Kia Carens)
- Naza Citra II Rondo (rebadged second generation Kia Carens)
- Naza Sorento (rebadged Kia Sorento)
- Naza Forza (rebadged Hafei Lobo, previously known as Naza Sutera)
- Naza 206 Bestari (rebadged Peugeot 206)
- Naza Picanto (rebadged Kia Picanto, previously known as Naza Suria)
- Naza Forte (rebadged Kia Forte)

== See also ==
- List of automobile manufacturers
- Kuala Muda Naza FC
- Howard Johnson's
- Crowne Plaza
- Park Geun-Hye
