= Berjaya Auto Alliance =

Malaysian automovile importer

- Type: Subsidiary
- Industry: Automotive
- Founded: 1997; 29 years ago
- Founder: Tan Sri SM Nasimuddin SM Amin
- Headquarters: Shah Alam, Malaysia
- Key people: SM Nasarudin SM Nasmuddin (CEO)
- Products: Automobiles
- Number of employees: 200
- Parent: Naza Group of Companies (1997-2022); Berjaya Corporation (71%); Stellantis (29%) (9 June 2022-present)
- Website: www.peugeot.com.my

Berjaya Auto Alliance, formerly known as Nasim Sdn Bhd (NSB), is a Malaysian automotive company. Founded in 1997 as Nasim, they become the sole importer and distributor for the Peugeot brand in Malaysia. On 9 June 2022, Nasim was sold to Berjaya Corporation's automotive division, Bermaz Auto, who would become the official distributor for the Peugeot brand in Malaysia.

== Operations ==
After a year as importer and distributor for Peugeot in Malaysia, Peugeot became the third highest selling European vehicle manufacturer in Malaysia. In 2009, the company sales represented 86% of Peugeot's sales in Asean region. Until to-date, Nasim has sold about 25,000 Peugeot vehicles to Malaysian consumers.

In 2010, the PSA Peugeot Citroën selected Malaysia as its production hub for right-hand drive markets in the ASEAN region. Under this new partnership, Naza Automotive Manufacturing (NAM) launched the Malaysian made Peugeot 207 sedan in November 2010 which has since been exported to Thailand, Indonesia, Brunei, Sri Lanka and selected right-hand drive markets in Africa. The vehicles are marketed through the company branches and dealers. In 2011, the firm expanded its model line-up to include the Peugeot 308 CC, Peugeot RCZ and Peugeot 508.

In 2017, Peugeot became the official automobile sponsors for the Kuala Lumpur 2017 Southeast Asian Games, in which its fleet comprising the Peugeot 408, the Peugeot 508 and the Peugeot Traveller range. That same year, Peugeot were also the official cars for the 2017 ASEAN Para Games.

== Nasim network in Malaysia ==
Nasim's on-going network expansion has 34 outlets located in Malaysia. Nasim also provide 24-hours Peugeot Assistance service to their customers. Nasim also has world's first Peugeot Lounge at the Subang Skypark Terminal. On 15 February 2008, the company launched RM2 Million Peugeot 3S center in Glenmarie, Shah Alam.
