= SM Nasimuddin SM Amin =

Malaysian entrepreneur (born 1955)

Yang Berbahagia Tan Sri Dato' Seri Utama SM Nasimuddin SM Amin PSM PSD SPNS SPTJ DPMS
- Born: 27 January 1955; Kuala Pilah, Negeri Sembilan, Federation of Malaya (now Malaysia)
- Died: 1 May 2008 (aged 53); Los Angeles, California, U.S.
- Occupation: Founder of Naza Group
- Spouses: Puan Sri Zaleha Ismail (1977–2008, his death); Rokiah Abdullah (2nd wife)
- Children: 11

Sheikh Mohammad Nasimuddin Kamal bin Sheikh Mohamad Amin (27 January 1955 – 1 May 2008) was the founder, chairman and chief executive officer of the Naza Group of Malaysia.

== Background ==
Nasimuddin was born to a Minangkabau ancestry. He was always interested in cars and the automobile industry. He received his early education from Sekolah Rendah Tunku Munawir (1961–1966). He then studied at Sekolah Menengah Kebangsaan Tuanku Muhammad (1967–1972). Both schools are located in Kuala Pilah, Negri Sembilan. He has 10 siblings, SM Sharifuddin, Sheikh, SM Shalahuddin, Kitabunnesah Begam, Zaibunnesah Begam, Zainatunnesah, Zainun, Zarina and Norashikin.

In 1974, when he was 19, he had RM80,000 in his bank account which he saved from his remunerations from helping out his contractor father. He started his automobile business with an allocation of Approved Permits (APs) to import foreign cars. APs are government-issued permits to import cars for bumiputras. He made his first million in about a year.

=== Going into business ===
After starting up the business, he flew to Japan where he spent three months purchasing his first 20 units of used Japanese cars. Upon his return to Malaysia, he sold off all 20 units within three months.

Nasimuddin's automobile business began with a shop lot in Taman Maluri selling 10 to 15 units of cars each month. In 1979, he opened a branch in Kampung Baru, Kuala Lumpur doing retail and selling 40 to 60 cars monthly.

During those years, Nasimuddin decided to import used Japanese cars at a time when Japanese cars were popular with Malaysians.

He faced some challenges, including financing and how to convince customers to buy used cars when many were then not keen on foreign cars.

== Businesses ==
The Naza Group now has 15 business divisions covering industries such as cigarette distribution, credit and leasing, engineering, hotels, insurance, machine tools and parts, manufacturing, motorcycles, property, transport services, plantations and water craft.

He owned TTDI Development which is one of the most prominent real estate companies in Kuala Lumpur.

The Naza Group currently holds the Malaysian franchise for South Korea's Kia vehicles, and France's Peugeot vehicles. It also holds the import permits for Mazda vehicles. Naza has now also become the biggest and most prominent importer of luxury high-end vehicles like Mercedes-Benz in Malaysia with endeavours such as Naza-Brabus.

He was reported to be interested in buying a 40% interest and taking over Malaysia's national carmaker, Proton, which was reported to be in financial turmoil. He stated that he had already drawn his plan in turning around Proton if the Malaysian government gave the nod for him to buy a controlling stake of the company. He planned to build a RM1.2 billion factory in Bertam, Penang.

In April 2008, he ventured into the food business by launching the Bubba Gump Shrimp Co. Restaurant and Market.

== AP Controversy ==
Nasimuddin was implicated in the AP controversy of 2005, when he was dubbed the "AP King". It was claimed that he and three other prominent businessmen were monopolising the issuance of Approved Permits (APs). APs are government-issued permits used to control car imports, whereby 60 percent of APs are given to bumiputra Open AP holders, and 40 percent are given to franchise holders. The practice of APs helped shift dominance of the car import industry from the ethnic Chinese to the Malays. Prime Minister Mahathir Mohamad described Nasimuddin as an example of the New Economic Policy's (NEP) success, Bernama reported.

He said Nasimuddin had an extraordinary approach in developing his business, starting with selling imported used cars from Japan and then going on to collaborating with foreign companies to produce and sell local cars under his own brand name.

"He proved that the NEP was capable of producing successful bumiputras if they seized the available opportunities well. If all had the same opportunities and did what he had done, we may have achieved more than the NEP objectives," Dr Mahathir told Bernama.

== Awards and recognition ==
- In 2002, SM Nasimuddin was named Motoring Man of The Year by the New Straits Times.

=== Honours of Malaysia ===
- Malaysia
  - Commander of the Order of Loyalty to the Royal Family of Malaysia (PSD) - Datuk (1997)
  - Commander of the Order of Loyalty to the Crown of Malaysia (PSM) - Tan Sri (1998)
- Negeri Sembilan
  - Knight Grand Commander of the Grand Order of Tuanku Jaafar (SPTJ) - Dato' Seri (2000)
  - Principal Grand Knight of the Order of Loyalty to Negeri Sembilan (SPNS) - Dato' Seri Utama (2006)
- Selangor
  - Knight Commander of the Order of the Crown of Selangor (DPMS) - Dato' (1999)

=== Foreign honours ===
- South Korea
  - Unknown class of the Order of Industrial Service Merit (2006)

== Death ==
Nasimuddin died of stage four lung cancer at a private hospital in Long Beach, California, US on 1 May 2008. He was 53 years old. His body was brought back to Malaysia on 4 May 2008 and taken to Masjid Wilayah, Jalan Duta. More than 6,000 people came to Masjid Wilayah to pay their last respects including the Prime Minister Abdullah Ahmad Badawi along with Prime Minister Tun Dr. Mahathir Mohamad. The body was later taken to Batu 9 Muslim Cemetery in Hulu Langat, Selangor to be buried next to the grave of his beloved mother, Salbiah Abdul Majid.
