= Stellantis Mulhouse Plant =

French car manufacturing and assembly plant

- Aerial view of the factory in 2026

- Location within Alsace
- Coordinates: 47.7725°N 7.425556°E
- Products: Automobiles

The Stellantis Mulhouse Plant is a major car plant in France owned by Stellantis through Stellantis France. It has produced cars since 1972, notching up its first ten million in June 2008. Production processes include panel and component forming, welding, body painting and final assembly.

== History ==
Peugeot started manufacturing gear-boxes (transmissions) at their Mulhouse factory in 1962. The 1960s were a period of rapid expansion for Peugeot, with the market-place success of, in particular, their 204 enabling them to overtake Simca and Citroën in the domestic sales charts, which moved the manufacturer from fourth position to second in the French market. Peugeot were sufficiently profitable in this period to pursue a strategy that involved broadening their range downmarket, to include for the first time a model in the Supermini class. This car, launched towards the end of 1972, was the Peugeot 104, advertised at the time as Europe’s smallest four door saloon, and the first complete car to be assembled at the company’s Mulhouse plant. Subsequent output has included the 205, 106, 206 and 206 CC as well as the 307. The plant’s top sellers to date have been the Peugeot 205 and the Peugeot 106 with 2.2 million of each produced at Mulhouse.

Since 2004, Mulhouse output has also included Citroën badged vehicles starting with the Citroën C4 and the DS4. Production of the Peugeot 308 was initially shared with the nearby Sochaux plant. 90,000 of the cars have been produced at Mulhouse: but Since April 2012 Sochaux has become the sole production facility for the 308 in France.

In 2007 Peugeot employed 10,400 people at Mulhouse. In 2011 the reported headcount at the Mulhouse plant was down to 8,500. The 208 has been in production at Mulhouse since June 2012.

== Production ==
Peugeot were able to choose a relatively spacious site for their Mulhouse plant, which is the only car plant in France to incorporate within its fences a large forge, originally transferred from the company’s Sochaux location in 1963. The forge supplies other plants in Stellantis as well as third party customers including Ford, Volvo, Renault and BMW.

In 2005 output reached 400,000 vehicles, but in 2006 this was reduced to 341,000, and in 2007 to 294,000. In 2010 output recovered to 321,000.
