= Stellantis France =

French subsidiary of the car manufacturing corporation

Stellantis Auto S.A.S.
- Formerly: Peugeot Citroën Automobiles S.A.; PSA Automobiles S.A.
- Type: Subsidiary
- Industry: Automotive
- Founded: Poissy, France; 1998; 28 years ago
- Headquarters: Poissy, France
- Area served: France
- Key people: Xavier Chéreau (Vice President of Stellantis and representative of the group in France); Xavier Duchemin (managing director of Stellantis France)
- Products: Automobiles; Automotive parts; Financing; Logistics; Motorcycles
- Brands: Citroën; DS; Peugeot
- Revenue: ▼€62.6 billion (2024)
- Number of employees: ▼34,175 (2024)
- Parent: PSA Group (1998–2021); Stellantis (2021–)
- Website: www.stellantis.com/fr/

Stellantis France, officially Stellantis Auto S.A.S., formerly Peugeot Citroën Automobiles S.A. and PSA Automobiles S.A., is the French subsidiary of the multinational automotive manufacturing corporation Stellantis. It was created in 1998 to bring together the French automotive development and manufacturing activities of Peugeot and Citroën into a single entity within the PSA Peugeot Citroën group.

Led by Xavier Duchemin, Stellantis France is not the successor to PSA Group, which merged with Fiat Chrysler Automobiles (FCA), but represents the activities of PSA, and subsequently Stellantis, in France.

== History ==
=== Peugeot Citroën Automobiles S.A. (1998–2017) ===
In 1998, PSA Peugeot Citroën (Peugeot S.A.) reorganized its “Automotive” division: Automobiles Peugeot and Automobiles Citroën transferred all of their automotive development and manufacturing activities to Peugeot Citroën Automobiles S.A.

In 2012, PSA Peugeot Citroën announced the elimination of 8,000 jobs at its French sites and the closure of the PSA plant in Aulnay-sous-Bois in 2014. In November 2012, PSA Group shares fell to less than €4.50, valuing the group at just €1.59 billion and precipitating the abandonment of the planned merger between Opel Automobile GmbH and Peugeot Citroën Automobiles S.A., the group's automotive division in France.

In February 2013, Peugeot Citroën Automobiles S.A. reported a loss of €1.5 billion for 2012, or nearly €5 billion when asset impairments and accounting presentation are taken into account.

=== PSA Automobiles S.A. (2017–2021) ===
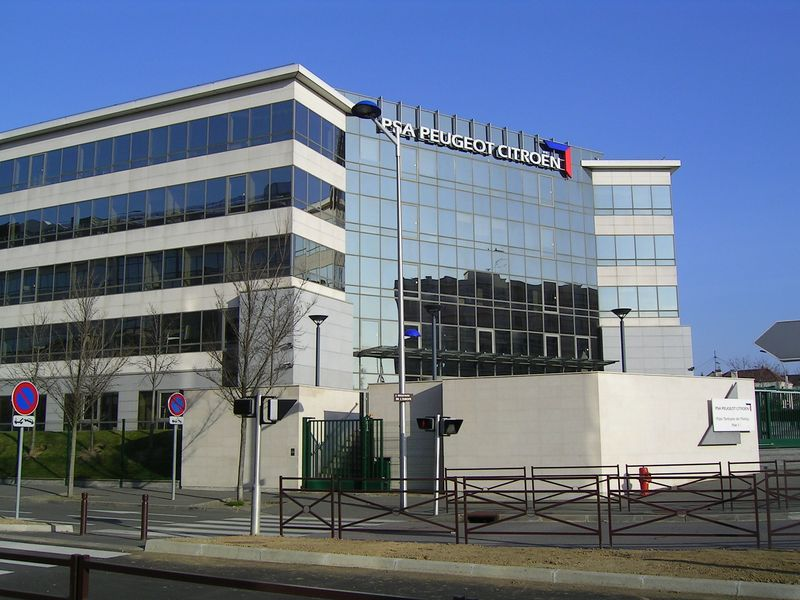
PSA's Center of Expertise for Trades and Regions, now the headquarters of Stellantis France, in 2008, in Poissy.

On April 5, 2016, PSA Peugeot Citroën became Groupe PSA and changed its logo. Peugeot Citroën Automobiles was renamed PSA Automobiles in 2017.

In November 2018, PSA Automobiles S.A. announced the closure of the PSA plant in Saint-Ouen in 2021. The last employees left the plant in March 2021. The land was sold by Stellantis to AP-HP in November 2021 for an undisclosed amount.

Between 2007 and 2018, the workforce of PSA Automobiles S.A., a subsidiary of the PSA Group in France, fell by more than 43,000 employees (approximately 40%) due in particular to relocations.

On November 18, 2019, PSA Automobiles S.A.' trade unions approved the merger between PSA Group (Peugeot S.A.) and Fiat Chrysler Automobiles (FCA).

=== Stellantis France (2021–) ===
On May 12, 2021, Xavier Chéreau, Vice President of Stellantis and Chief Human Resources Officer of Stellantis N.V., took over as CEO of PSA Automobiles.

In 2022, strikes over wages are on the rise at Stellantis' French sites, particularly at the Hordain plant in the Nord department, where around 500 employees are reported to have exercised their right to strike.

On November 5, 2023, PSA Automobiles S.A. becomes Stellantis Auto S.A.S., operating under the name Stellantis France.

At the end of 2025, employee concerns are mounting following job cuts, partial unemployment, and sites that have been shut down for several days. On October 21, 2025, Stellantis France management announced that operations at the Stellantis Sochaux Plant in the Doubs department would be suspended until October 24, 2025, having already been shut down since October 15. This shutdown of nearly 10 days represents a loss of 7,500 vehicles, which trade unions say is due to supply difficulties with gearboxes. A similar situation is also affecting the Stellantis Poissy Plant, which has been shut down since October 13 in order to “adapt its production rate to a difficult market in Europe,” according to site management.

== Organization ==
=== Management ===
- Xavier Chéreau, Vice President of Stellantis N.V., representative of the group in France;
- Xavier Duchemin, Managing Director of Stellantis France.

==== Peugeot ====
- Alain Favey, CEO of Peugeot, replacing Linda Jackson since February 3, 2025;
- Zineb Ghout, Director of Peugeot Europe since November 18, 2024;
- Lionel Ehrhard, Director of Peugeot France since December 10, 2024;

==== Citroën ====
- Xavier Chardon, CEO of Citroën since June 2, 2025;
- Laurent Diot, Director of Citroën Europe since July 3, 2023;
- Edouard George, Director of Citroën France since March 3, 2025.

==== Opel/Vauxhall ====
- Florian Huettl, CEO of Opel/Vauxhall and Director of Stellantis Germany, replaced Maxime Picat on May 19, 2022. He was reappointed to his position on April 7, 2025;
- Charles Peugeot, Director of Opel France since March 3, 2025.

== Production ==
=== Assembly plants ===
Stellantis has five assembly plants in France: Poissy, Sochaux (the largest in France and the second largest in Europe), Mulhouse-Sausheim, Rennes, and Hordain (with Fiat until 2012).

In 2009, PSA Automobiles S.A.'s sites produced nearly 1,220,660 vehicles. France was then the PSA Group's leading production country, far ahead of Spain (507,312 units) and Iran (336,228 cars).

=== Technical and industrial management ===
- Engines: Douvrin (with Renault), Trémery, and Hérimoncourt. In 2015, PSA Automobiles S.A. produced approximately 2.4 million engines in France.
- Gearboxes: Metz-Borny, Valenciennes;
- Foundry and forge: Caen, Mulhouse-Sausheim, Sochaux, Saint-Ouen, Sept-Fons, Vesoul, Charleville.

=== Study and research centers ===
- Vélizy, 5,200 employees;
- Poissy (CEMR B);
- Sochaux, 2,050 employees;
- Carrières-sous Poissy, 850 employees.

=== Test centers ===
- Belchamp, 1,252 employees;
- La Ferté-Vidame, 178 employees. Tertiary hub and headquarters of Stellantis France:
- Poissy (CEMR A), 4,300 employees.

The data centers are located in Bessoncourt in the Territoire de Belfort, and in Achères, in the Yvelines department.
