= Peugeot 206 =

Supermini car produced by Peugeot (1998–2024)

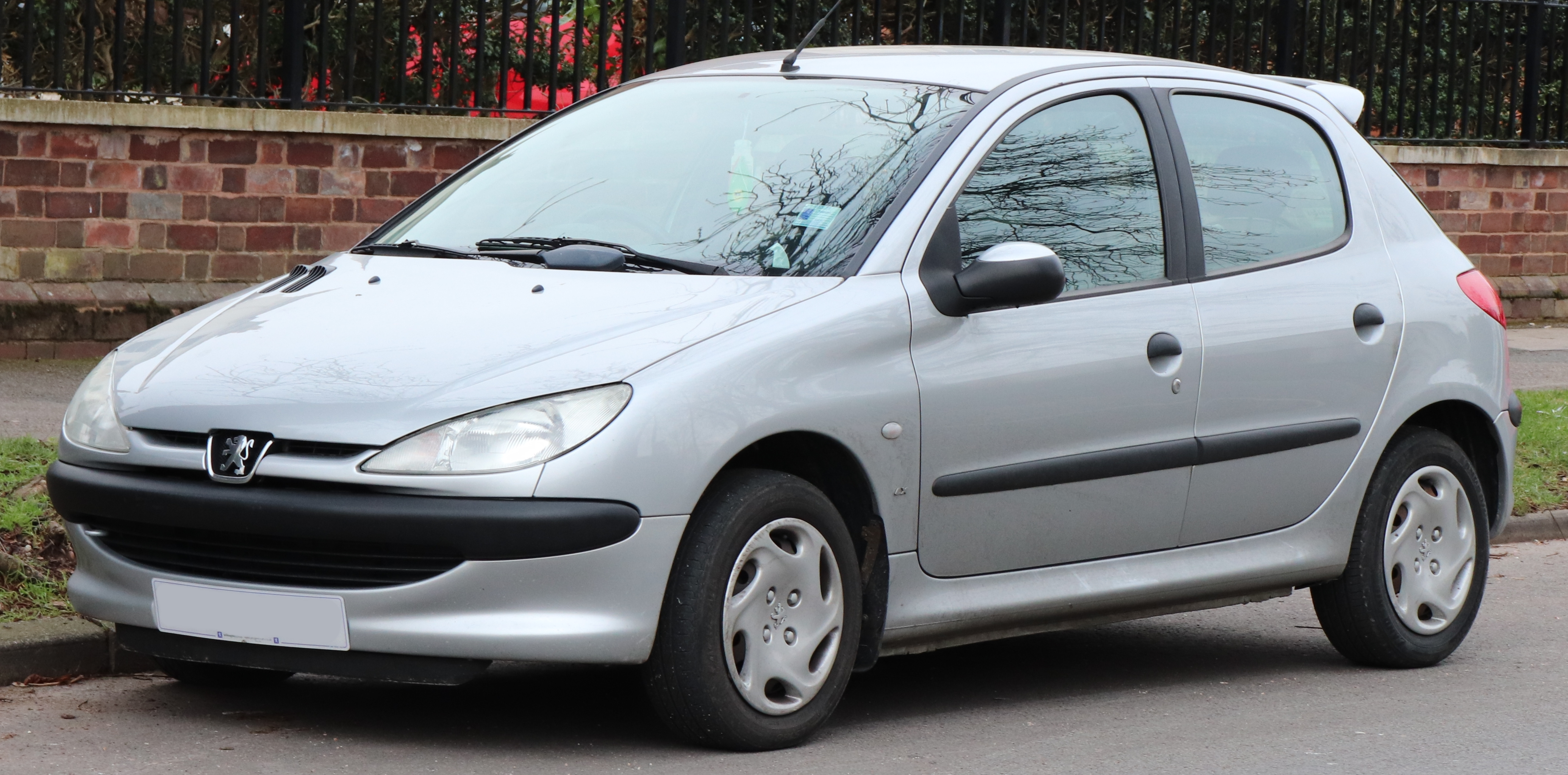

Overview
- Manufacturer: Peugeot
- Also called: Peugeot 206+ (Europe, 2009–2012); Peugeot 207 Compact (Latin America, 2008–December 2009); Peugeot 207 Brasil (Brazil, 2008–2014); Peugeot 207 Sedan (sedan, China and Southeast Asia); Peugeot 207i (Iran, 2010–present); Citroën C2 (China, 2006–2013); Naza 206 Bestari (Malaysia, 2006–2011)
- Production: May 1998 – December 2012 (France); July 1999 – January 2007 (UK); 2006–2013 (China); 2003–2006 (Indonesia); 1999–2004 (Chile); April 2001 – January 2015 (Brazil); July 1999 – December 2016 (Argentina); April 2001 – present (Iran)
- Assembly: France: Mulhouse (Mulhouse Plant: 3/5-door hatchback); France: Poissy (Poissy Plant: 206 SW); France: Cerizay (Heuliez: 206 CC); Argentina: Buenos Aires (Sevel Argentina); Brazil: Porto Real (PSA Group Portaria Norte); Chile: Los Andes (Automotores Franco Chilena S.A.); China: Wuhan (DPCA); Indonesia: North Jakarta (Gaya Motor); Iran: Tehran (IKCO); United Kingdom: Ryton (Ryton Plant); Uruguay: Barra de Carrasco (Oferol); Malaysia: Gurun (NAM)
- Designer: Gérard Welter (206) (Note: As head of the design team.); Murat Günak (206 CC)

Body and chassis
- Class: Supermini (B)
- Body style: 3/5-door hatchback 2-door coupé cabriolet (206 CC); 5-door estate (206 SW); 4-door saloon (206 SD)
- Layout: Front-engine, front-wheel-drive
- Platform: PSA PF1 platform
- Related: Peugeot Hoggar; Citroën C2; Citroën C3; Peugeot 1007; IKCO Runna

Powertrain
- Engine: Petrol: 1.0 L D4D 16V I4 (Brazil); 1.1 L TU1JP I4; 1.4 L TU3A/TU3JP I4; 1.4 L ET3J4 16V I4; 1.6 L TU5JP I4; 1.6 L TU5JP4 16V I4; 2.0 L EW10J4/J4S 16V I4; Diesel: 1.4 L DV4 HDi I4; 1.6 L DV6 HDi 16V I4; 1.9 L DW8 I4; 2.0 L DW10 HDi I4
- Transmission: 4-speed ZF AL4 automatic 5-speed manual 6-speed manual (motorsport only)

Dimensions
- Wheelbase: 2,442 mm (96.1 in)
- Length: 3,835 mm (151.0 in) (hatchback); 3,872 mm (152.4 in) (206+ and 207 Compact hatch); 4,000 mm (157.5 in) (coupé cabriolet); 4,188 mm (164.9 in) (saloon, Europe); 4,235 mm (166.7 in) (saloon, South America); 4,028 mm (158.6 in) (estate)
- Width: 1,652 mm (65.0 in) (hatchback/CC); 1,673 mm (65.9 in) (GTI/S16/GTI 180/RC); 1,655 mm (65.2 in) (saloon); 1,652 mm (65.0 in) (estate)
- Height: 1,428 mm (56.2 in) (hatchback); 1,373 mm (54.1 in) (coupé cabriolet); 1,456 mm (57.3 in) (saloon); 1,460 mm (57.5 in) (estate)
- Kerb weight: 950–1,145 kg (2,094–2,524 lb)

Chronology
- Predecessor: Peugeot 205
- Successor: Peugeot 207

The Peugeot 206 is a supermini car (B-segment) designed and produced by the French car manufacturer Peugeot from 1998 to 2024 as a replacement to the Peugeot 205. Developed under the codename T1, it was released in September 1998 in hatchback form, which was followed by coupé cabriolet (206 CC) in September 2000, station wagon (206 SW) in September 2001, and a sedan version (206 SD, which is an abbreviation of the Iranian word sandogh-dar, "sedan", made, produced and sold in Iran) in September 2005, before being replaced by the 207 in April 2006.

Its facelifted version was initially launched in South America in September 2008, and in China in November 2008, in hatchback, sedan and station wagon (Note: Not available in China.) body styles, and marketed as the 207 Compact, and as the 207 respectively. This version was subsequently launched in Europe in February 2009, only in hatchback form and marketed as the 206+. In South America, where it was assembled in Argentina as well as Brazil, it continued to be offered as the 207 Compact until January 2017, and also in China, both under the 207 nameplate and as the Citroën C2.

The 206 is the best-selling Peugeot model of all time with 8,358,217 cars sold by 2012. In 2020, the 206 had been counted as the thirtieth most long-lived single generation car by Autocar magazine. In Iran, sales of the Peugeot 206 were discontinued in 2024.But In Iran, sales of the Peugeot 207i (an upgraded Peugeot 206) are still ongoing.

== Overview ==
=== Project ===
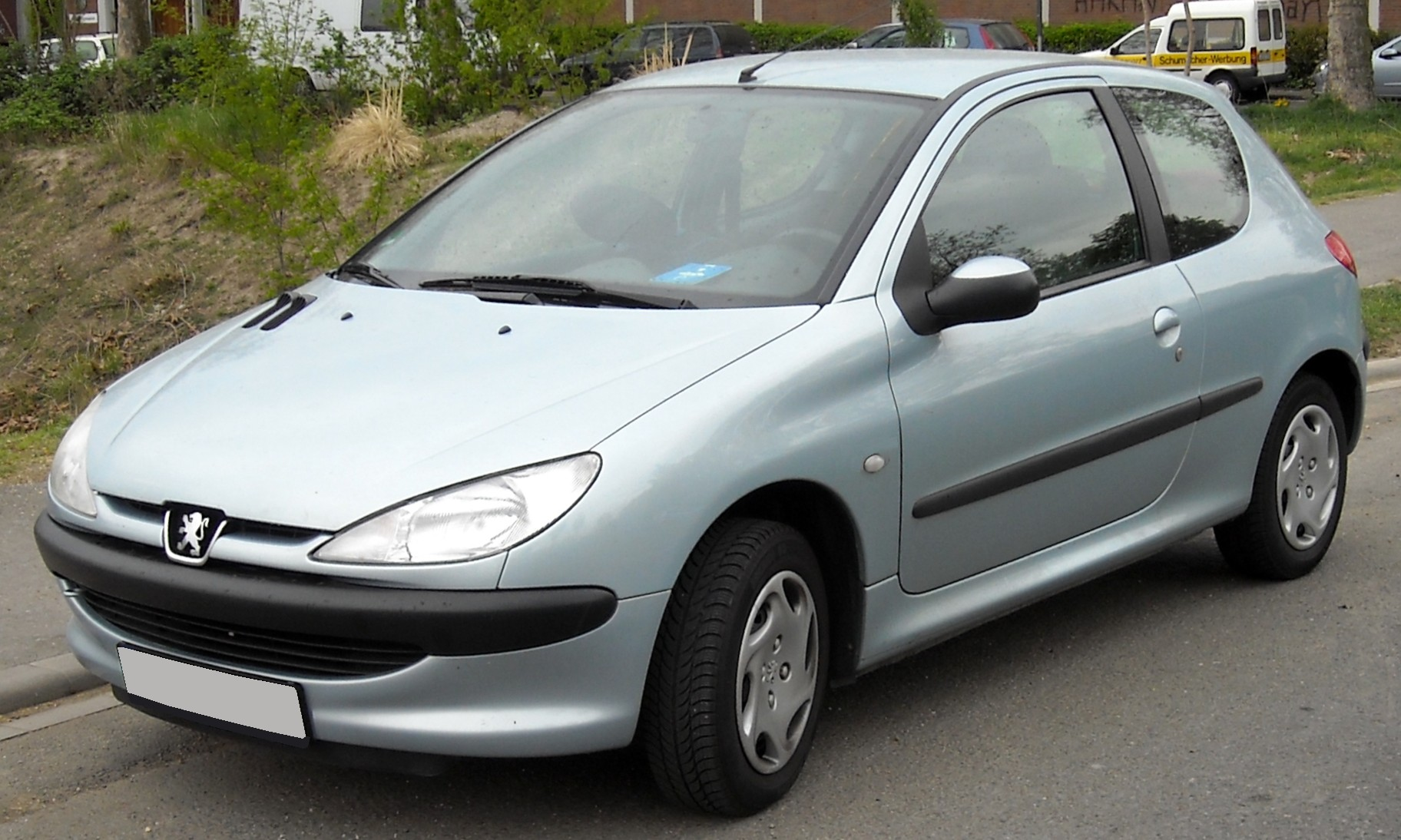

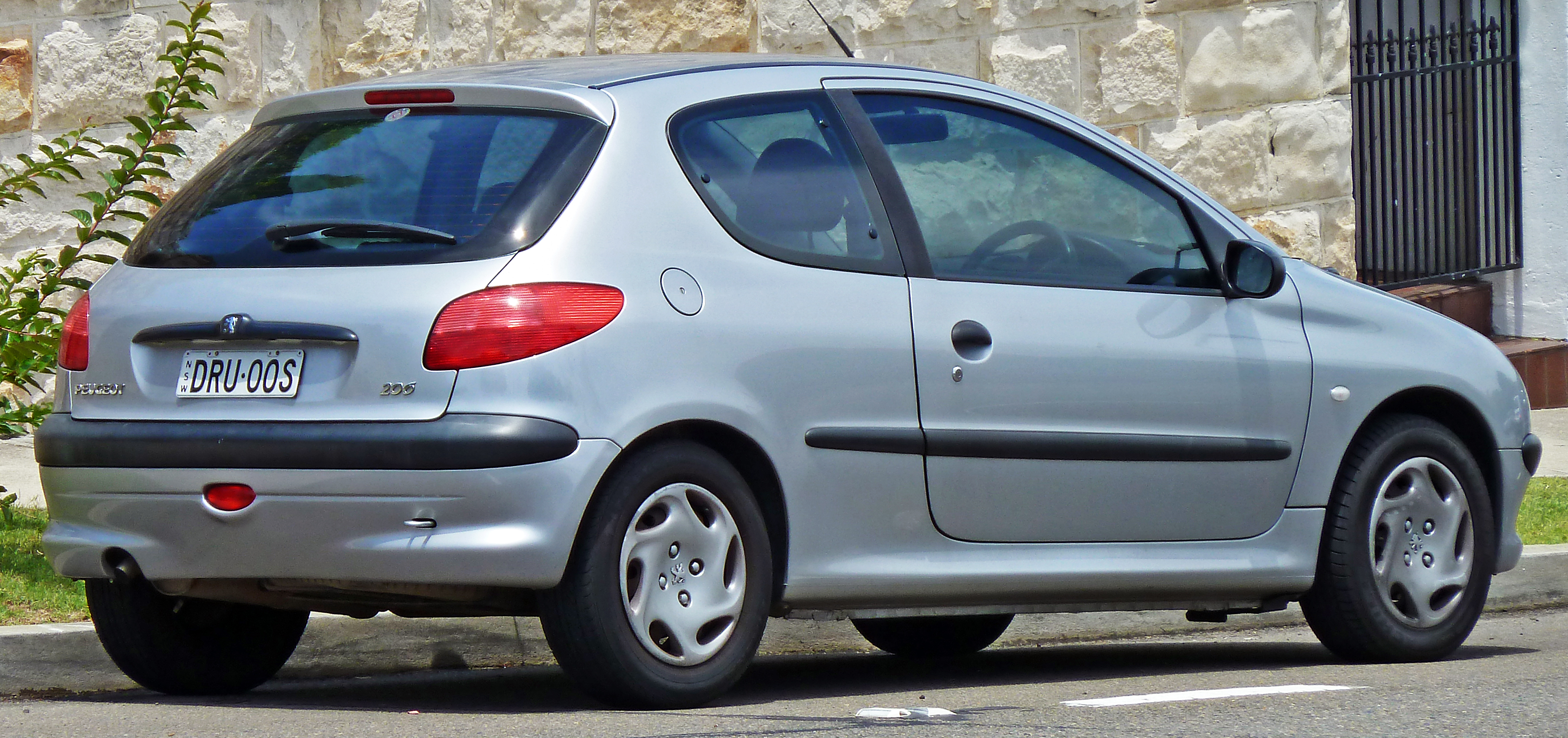
1998–2003

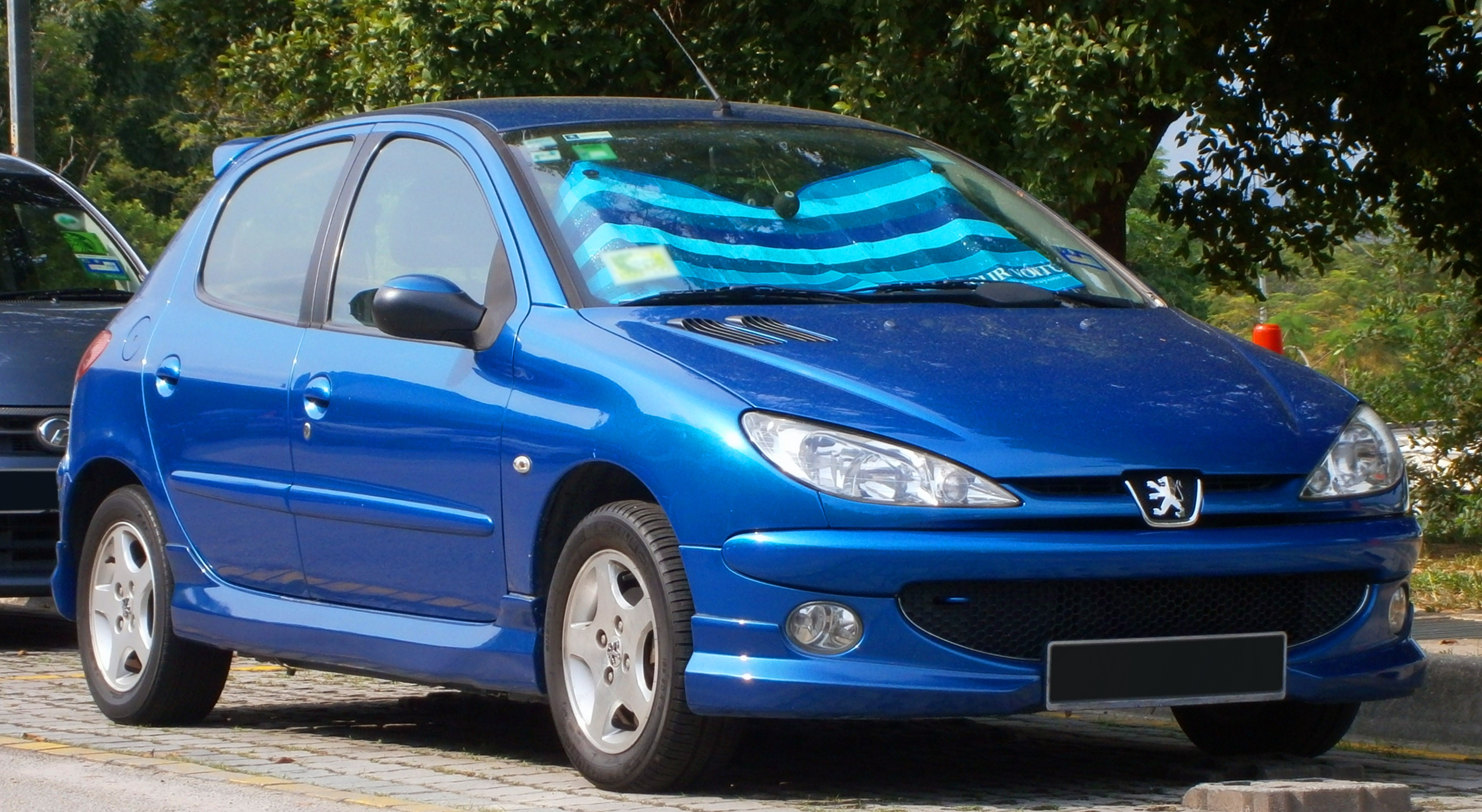

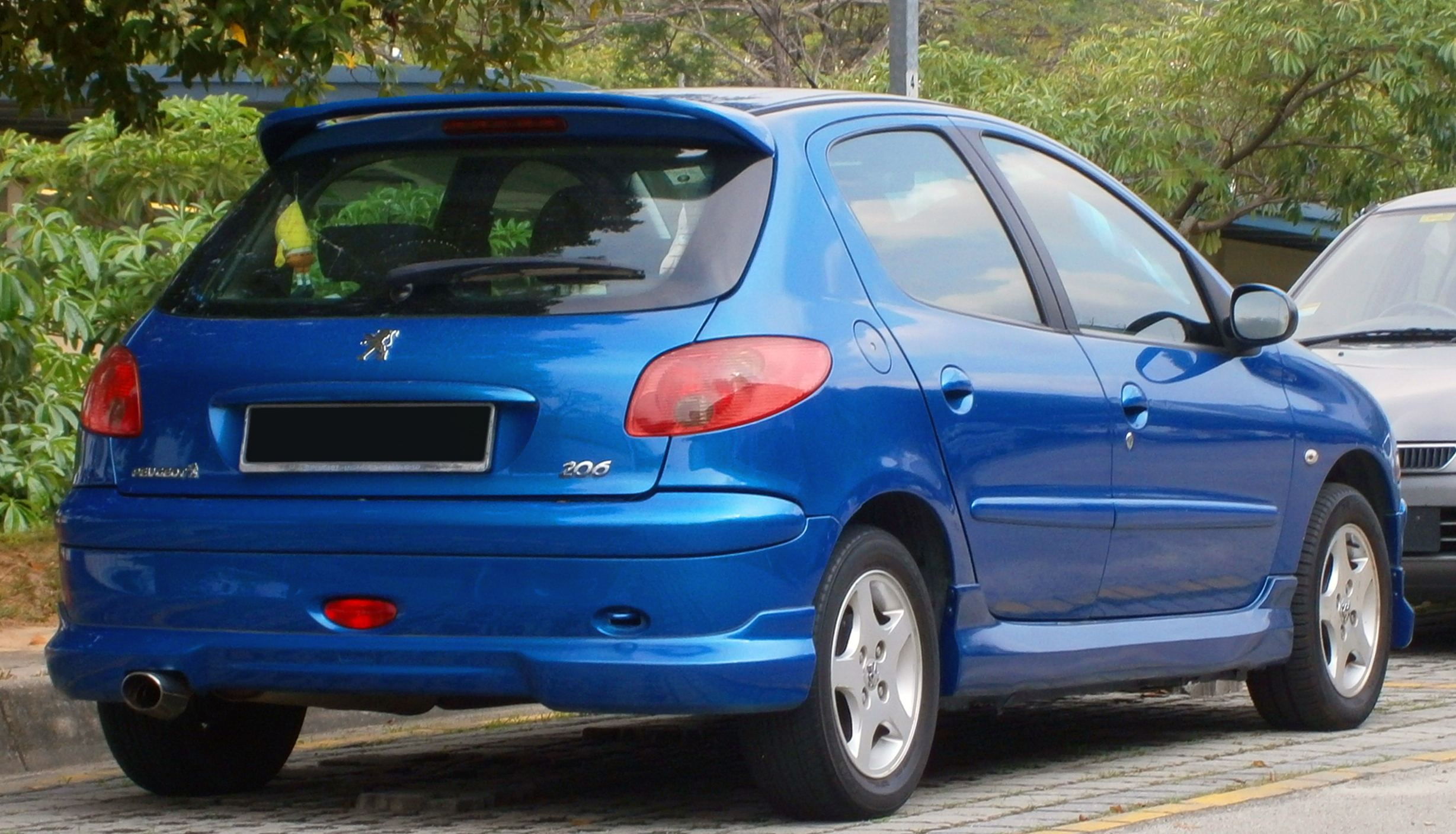
2003–2009

During the early 1990s, Peugeot decided not to directly replace the Peugeot 205, citing the reason that superminis were no longer profitable or worthwhile. Instead, Peugeot followed a unique strategy and decided that its new, smaller, supermini, the Peugeot 106 (launched in 1991), would take sales from the lower end of the 205 range while the lowest models of the Peugeot 306 range, launched in 1993 to replace the Peugeot 309, would take sales from the top-end 205s. Between the 106 and 306, Peugeot hoped that the 205 would not need to be replaced, and could be phased out slowly, while customers who would normally plump for the 205 would continue to have a choice with either a smaller or larger car. This strategy did not work. With the 205 phased out, other superminis like the Ford Fiesta and Volkswagen Polo continued to sell well and increased in popularity, and without a direct competitor to these cars Peugeot was losing sales fast. A new supermini was required, and the 206 was launched in September 1998 as a somewhat belated replacement for the 205.

On 7 April 1994, Jacques Calvet, then president of Peugeot, approved of the 206 development program codenamed T1, with launch planned by 1997. The in-house design team was led by Peugeot's Head of Design, Murat Günak, and designer Gérard Welter. The design was fixed six months after project approval, and the project took 34 months from design freeze to start of production. The development costs a total of 6.3 billion francs, with intensive use of IT as it is their first car designed with a digital mock-up along with crash simulations. The prototype was extensively tested on the Belchamp test circuit in the Valentigney forest. With no larger in-house platform from PSA Group to base its new supermini on (the Peugeot 106 shared its platform with the Citroën Saxo), Peugeot developed an all-new front drive platform for the 206.

=== Powertrain ===
The 206 was originally launched as a hatchback with 1.1L, 1.4L, and 1.6L petrol engines and a 1.9L diesel engine, an HDi version with common rail coming later. In 1999 a 2.0L GTi capable of 210 km/h (130 mph), and in 2003 a tuned version of the GTi called the Peugeot 206 RC (GTi 180 in the UK), were added to the range. It did 0–100 km/h (0–62 mph) in 7.4 seconds and it reached a top speed of 220 km/h (137 mph) with 177 PS (130 kW). In 2001, two more versions of the 206 were launched – the 206 CC (coupé convertible) with a folding steel roof and the 206 SW station wagon. A 4-door notchback sedan version, developed by Iran Khodro, was unveiled in late 2005, and it is available in the Iranian, North African, Chinese, Russian, Romanian, Turkish and Bulgarian markets.

=== Production and marketing ===
The Peugeot 206 was mainly manufactured in Peugeot's Poissy and Mulhouse factories in France until 18 December 2012, as well as in Ryton, United Kingdom, whereas outside Europe it was produced in Iran (Iran Khodro), Chile (for the Mexican and Colombian markets, French-made 206s were cheaper than Chilean-built ones, in Chile), Argentina (PSA), Brazil (PSA), Uruguay (Oferol), China (Dongfeng), Indonesia (Gaya Motor) and Malaysia (Naza). In 2003, it received a minor facelift, getting clear headlights, different rear clusters, new side repeater lamps, chrome badges, a new range of colors, as well as other subtle interior revisions.

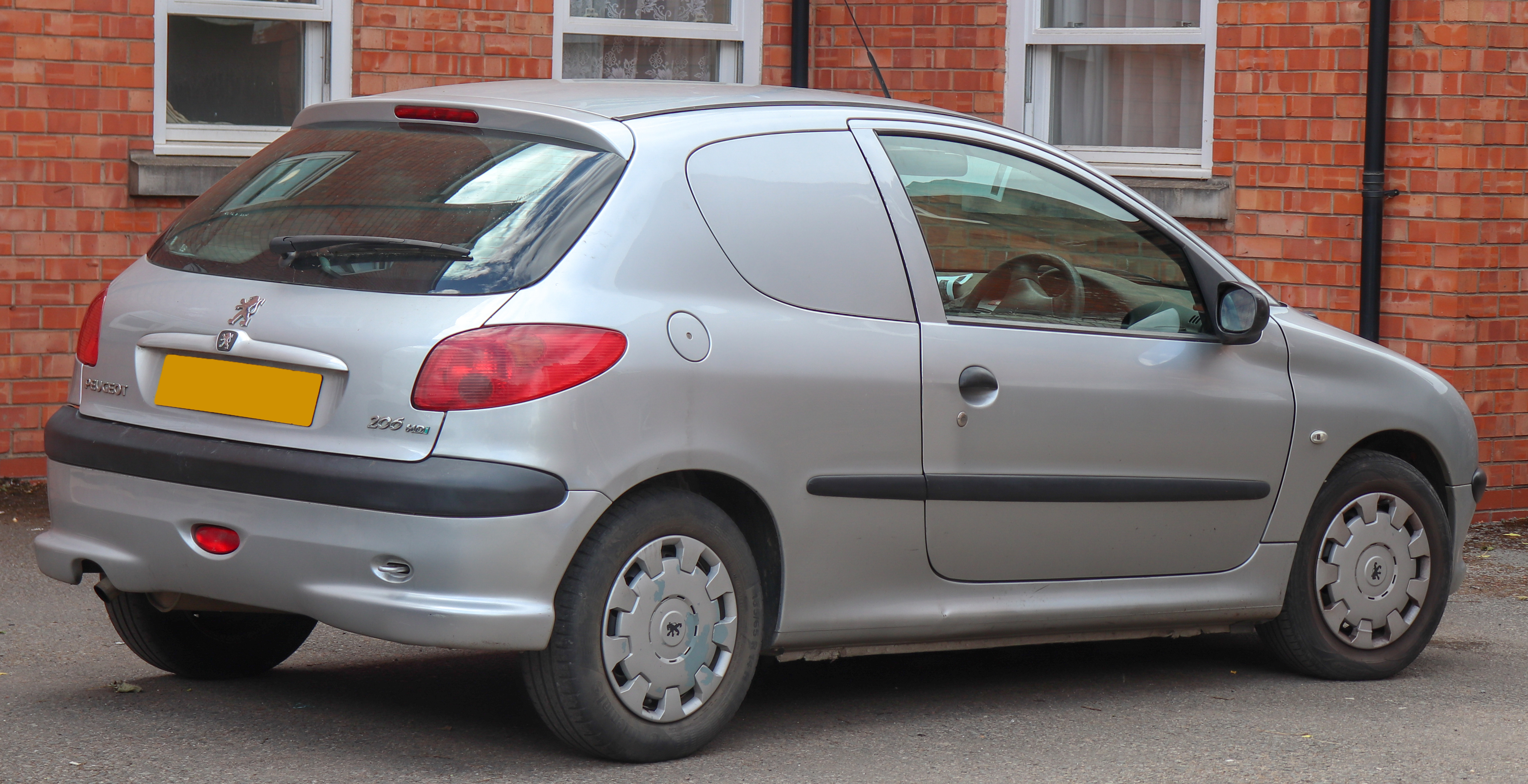
Peugeot 206 Van

The Peugeot 206 was also assembled at its Ryton facility in Coventry, England, however, with the introduction of the 207 to the range, Peugeot decided to close the Ryton factory, ending the 206 production on 12 December 2006 and move production to Slovakia, due to the fact that they could produce their vehicles with same or better quality for a lower price there.

The Peugeot 206 proved to be a sales success all over Europe. It was one of the best-selling cars in Europe from 2001 to 2003 and it was the best car of the year in the UK for three consecutive years, between 1998 and 2001. The 1.4-litre XR was the best-selling model. On 26 May 2005, the 206 celebrated the five millionth unit produced since its commercial launch on 10 September 1998. Sales in the United Kingdom were strong from the start, with the 206 regularly being among the nation's five most popular new cars during its first six years on sale. Second hand examples of the 206 traditionally hold their value well, due to high demand.

Production in Brazil took place in Porto Real, Rio de Janeiro, starting in 2001 with the hatchback, followed by the station wagon version in 2005. The models produced there featured 1.0-litre 16-valve, 1.4-litre 8-valve and 1.6-litre 16-valve engines, the last two of which are flexible fuel engines (petrol/ethanol). The 1.0-litre version used a Renault-sourced engine and was produced until 2006.

The Peugeot 206 has also been produced in Villa Bosch, Buenos Aires, Argentina, from July 1999 to 7 December 2016. The trim levels manufactured are XR, XRD, XS, XT and XTD. The diesel powered versions use the naturally aspirated DW engine. Some of these versions are equipped with local-made engines in Jeppener, Buenos Aires.

In May 2006, the Malaysian car manufacturer Naza launched a locally assembled version of the model with the name of 206 Bestari. In 2006, Peugeot started production of the 206 in China. In September 2006, Dongfeng Peugeot-Citroën Automobile launched a slightly modified Peugeot 206 called the Citroën C2 (this car was not related to the European-market Citroën C2).

== Body styles ==
=== 206 SW (T12) ===
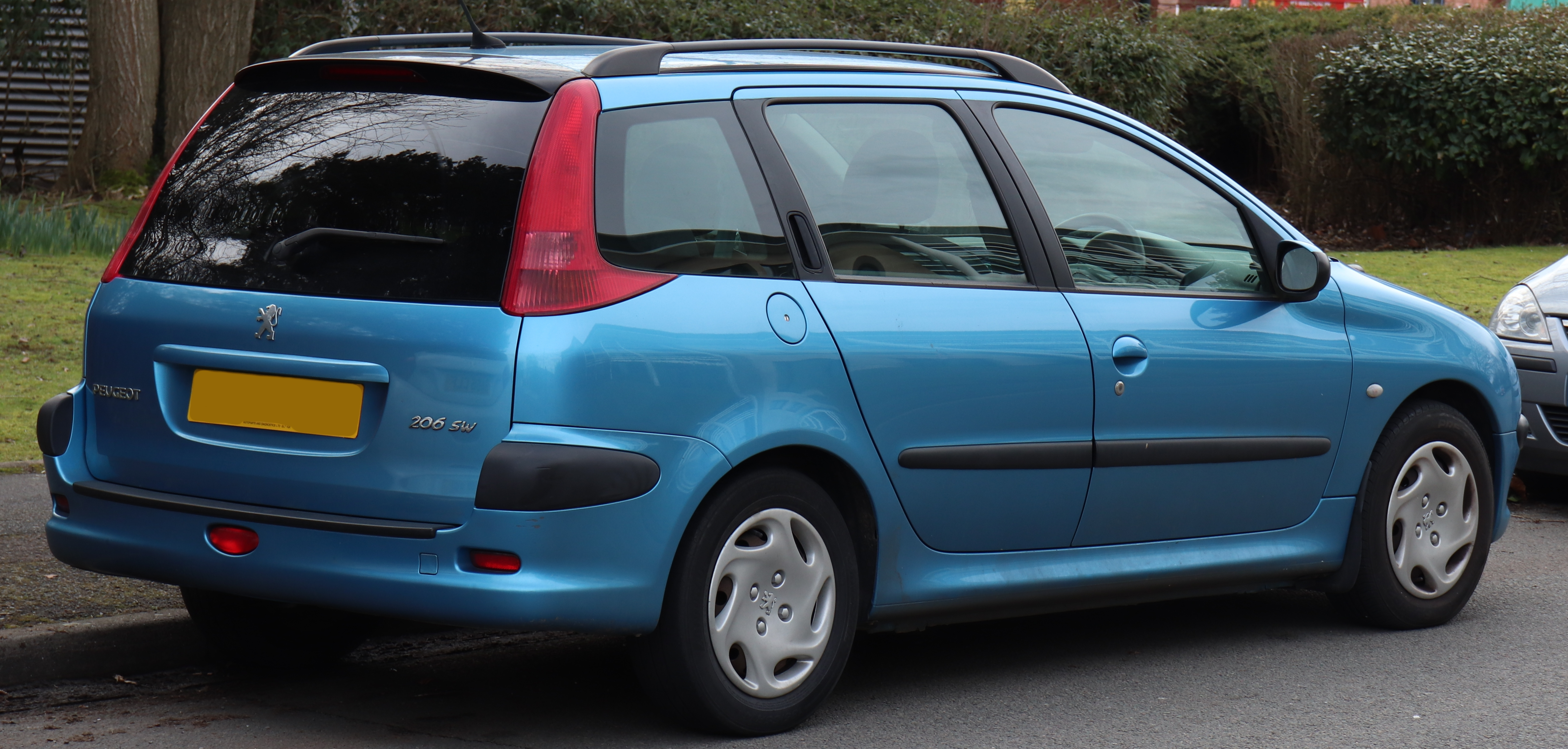
Peugeot 206 SW

In 2001, Peugeot showcased a near-production concept version of the 206 SW ("Sports Wagon"). Developed with the codename T12, the production model was released in March 2002 and was manufactured at the Ryton plant. It adopts a reinforced rear axle in order to support the excess weight. In 2007, the 206 SW assembly line was moved to Poissy after the Ryton plant was closed. By the end of its production, 366,000 units were produced. Sales ended in July 2006 after the 206 SW was replaced by the 207 SW.

=== 206 SD (T13; Saloon) ===
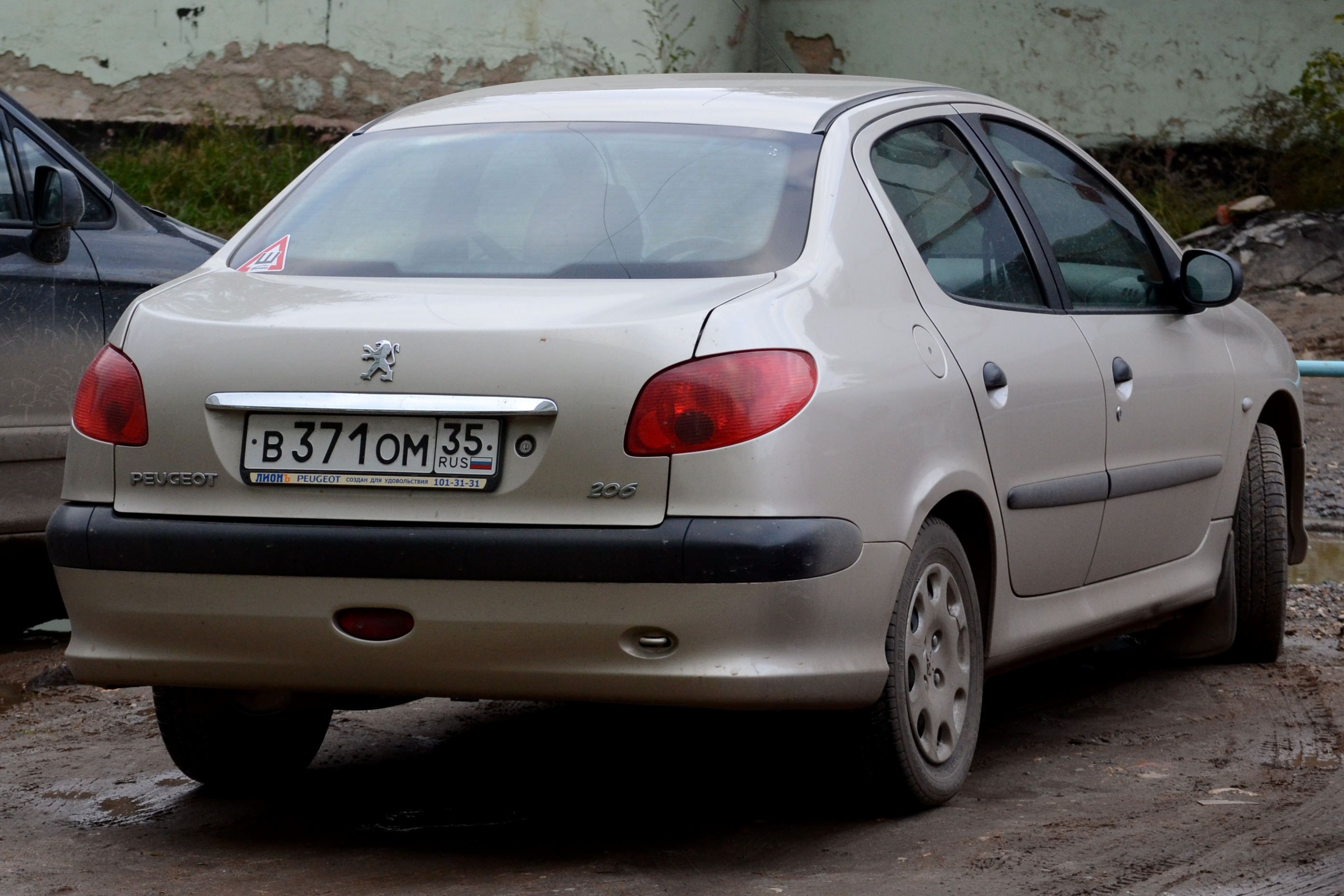
Peugeot 206 SD (Saloon)

A notchback saloon model was introduced in Iran in 2006. Developed under the codename T13, it was jointly designed by the Peugeot Design Center for Iran Khodro and is the fifth and last version of Peugeot 206 models.

Since 2006, Iran Khodro started exporting the 206 SD to other countries, including Russia, Ukraine, Turkey, Romania, Bulgaria, and Algeria, along with Serbia, Montenegro and Macedonia.

It was also produced in Brazil, starting from October 2008, with the front end of the 206+ and sold as the 207 Passion. It was not related, however, to the 207 sold in Europe. It was removed from offer in the first quarter of 2015. This model was also offered throughout the rest of Latin America, including in Chile, Argentina, Uruguay, Colombia, Ecuador or Mexico.

In Malaysia and China, it was also locally produced and sold as the 207, solely as a sedan version.

=== 206 CC (T16) ===
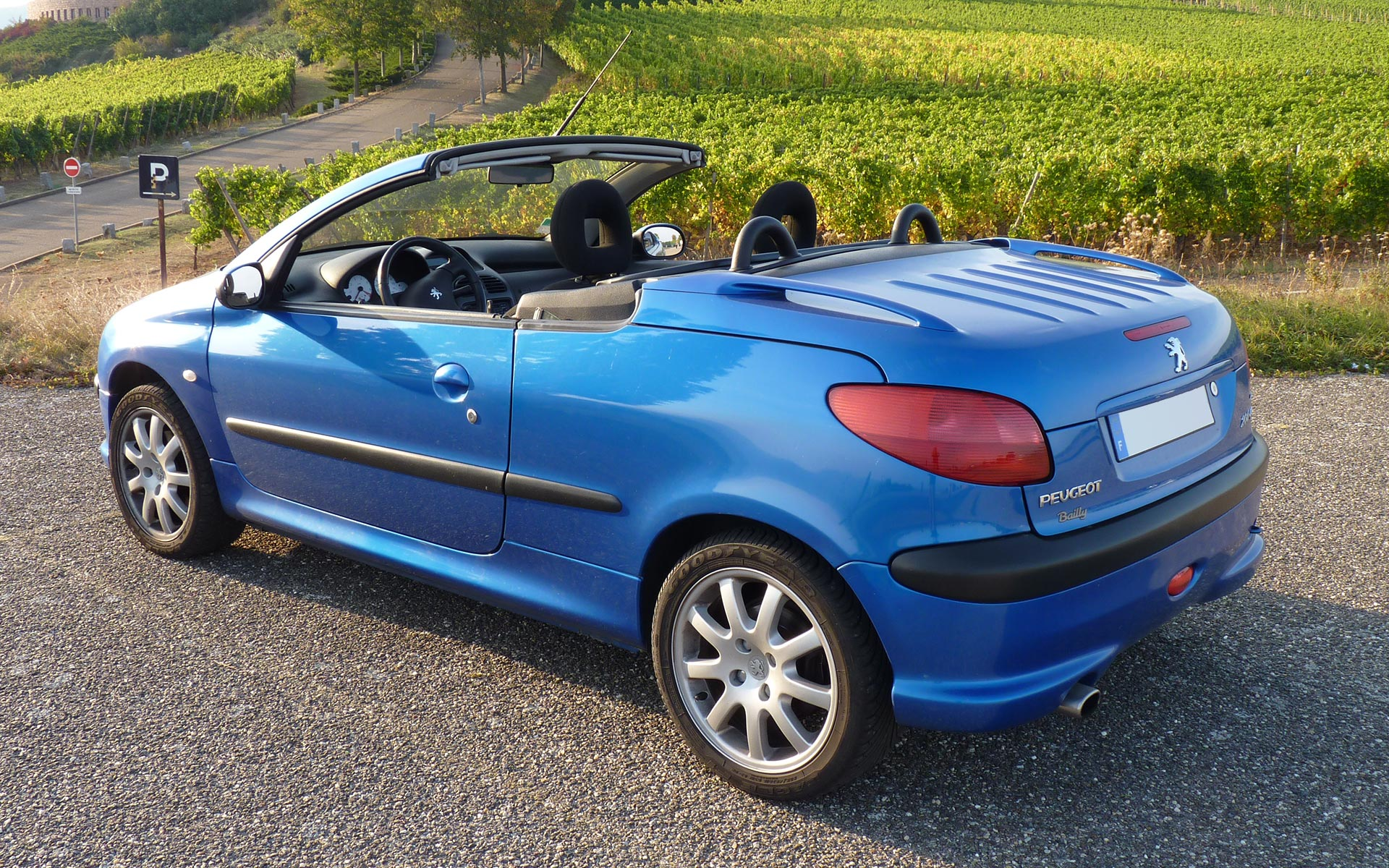
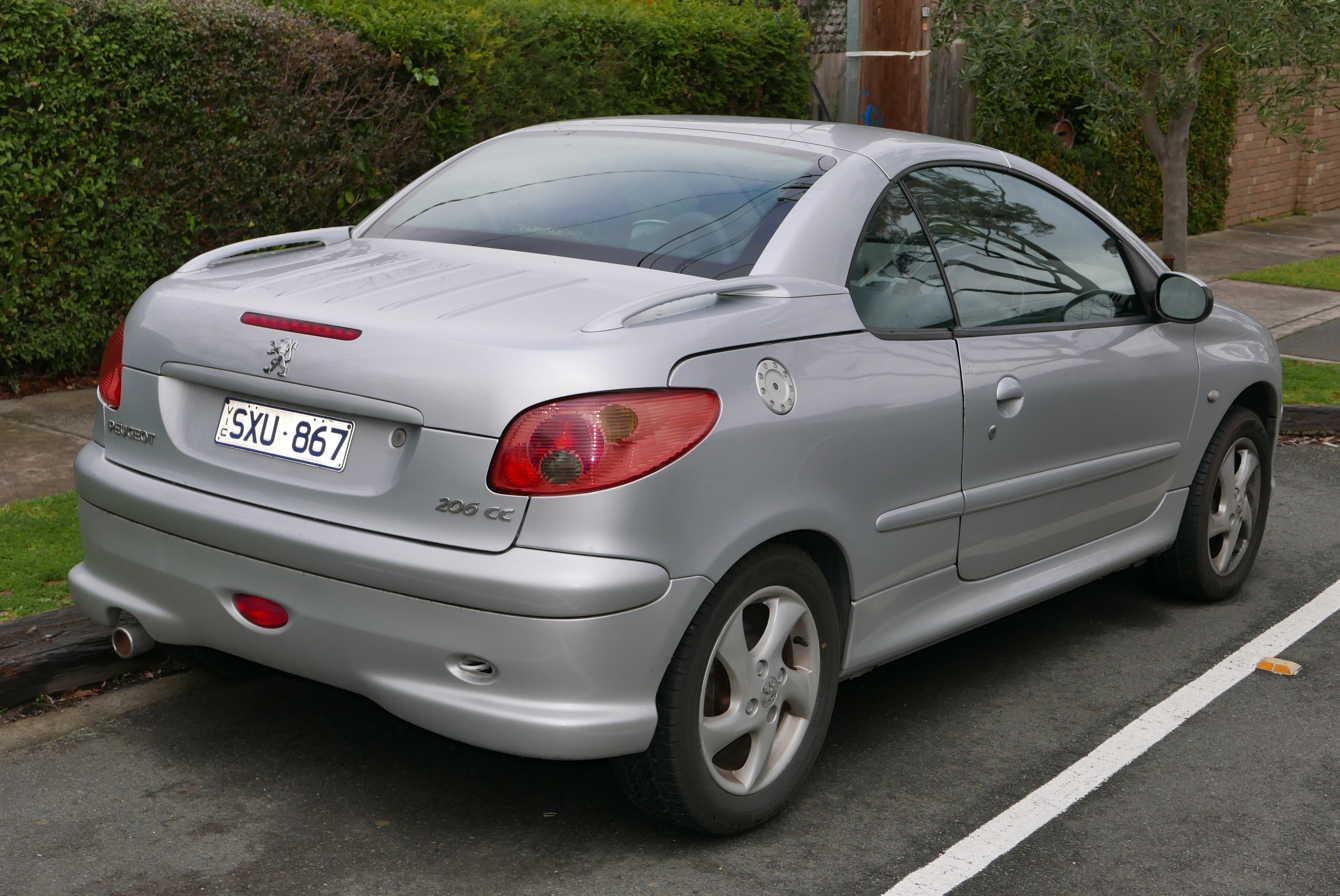
Peugeot 206 CC, with the roof retracted and unretracted

The Peugeot 206 CC was formally launched at the Paris Motor Show in September 2000 and was based on the Peugeot 20Coeur (or Two-oh-heart) concept car, revealed two years before at the Geneva Motor Show. It is a coupé cabriolet featuring a powered fold-away roof based on the Georges Paulin system, first seen on the 1935 Peugeot 402 Eclipse coupe.

It was developed with the codename T16. The roof-trunk modules, specific to the CC are manufactured in Cerizay, France, by the French company Heuliez, which is specialized in producing short series for niche markets such as convertibles or station wagons. Heuliez manufactured, assembled and painted the cars, while final assembly took place in Mulhouse. Production was stopped in early 2008, and it has since been replaced by the 207 CC.

== Variants ==
=== Grand Tourisme ===
In order to homologate the 206 World Rally Car, Peugeot needed to sell road going versions of the 206 that were at least 4.0 metres long (the minimum length stipulated by the FIA for WRC cars). The WRC car was homologated with the 206 Grand Tourisme, similar to the standard 206 but with front and rear body extensions to bring the car from the standard road car's 3.83 meters to the rally car's 4 metre length. 4000 cars in total were produced, each with a unique number on a plaque on the door pillar both sides. 600 right-hand drive cars were produced for the UK. The mechanicals fitted to the Grand Tourisme were what was fitted to the upcoming 206 GTI, not yet released.

=== GTi 180 and RC ===
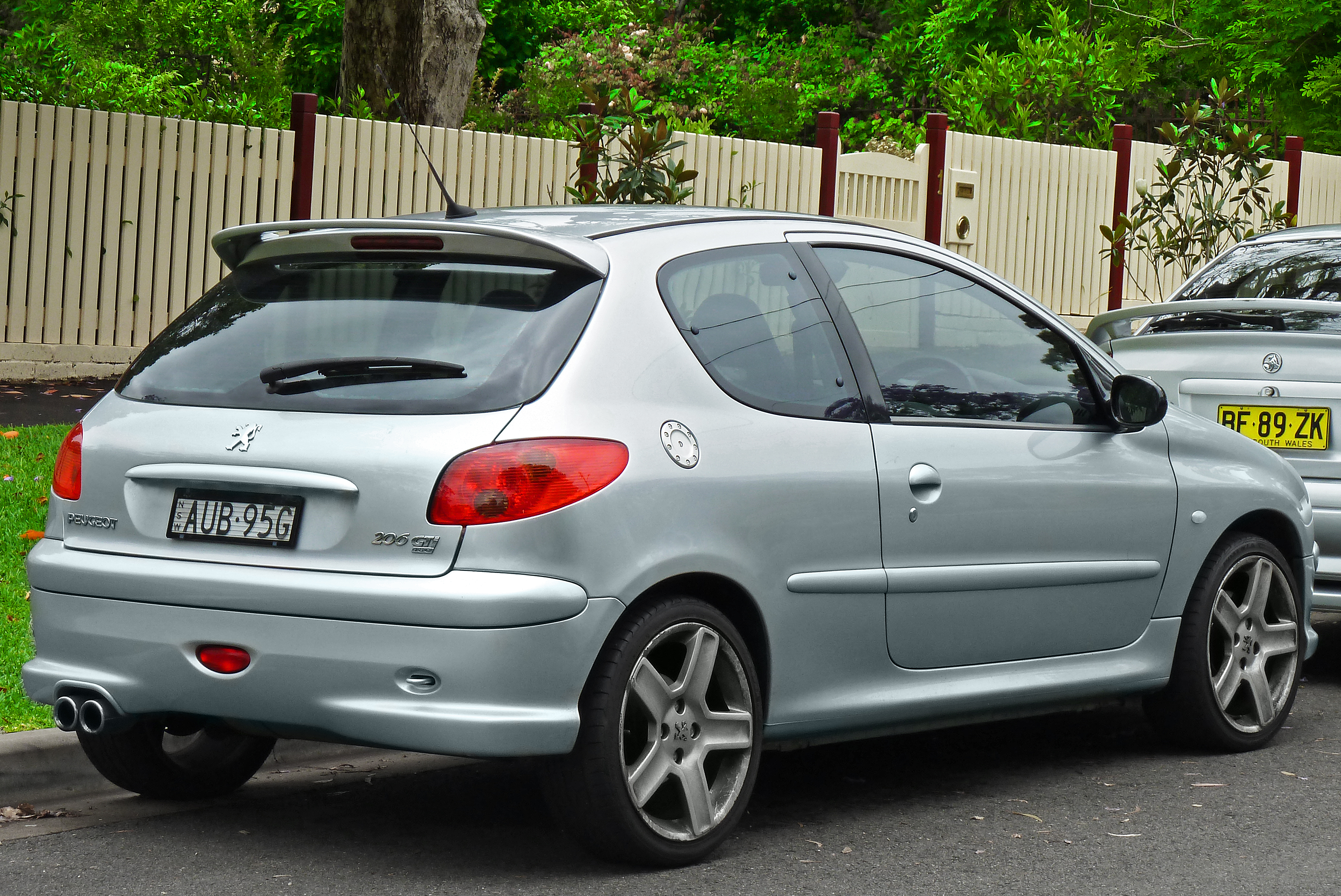
Peugeot 206 GTi 180 3-door hatchback (Australia)

Introduced to the market in 2003, the Peugeot 206 GTi 180 and 206 RC brought high performance to the product range. The range topping GTi 180 was brought to the UK market, while the 206 RC was introduced to the rest of Europe. The new 'hot hatch' used the 2 litre EW10J4S engine, which produced 175 bhp (130 kW; 177 PS) thanks to variable valve timing and modified inlet and exhaust manifolds. Other features on the 206 GTi 180 and 206 RC include 17 inch alloy wheels, racing bucket front seats, a short shift gear linkage and altered gearbox ratios (1st & 2nd gears). The new car was capable of reaching 62 mph (100 km/h) in 7.4 seconds.

The 206 GTi 180 and 206 RC were produced to celebrate Peugeot's rallying successes from 2000 to 2003, and to replicate the success Peugeot had with the 205 GTi in the 1980s.

=== 206 Escapade ===
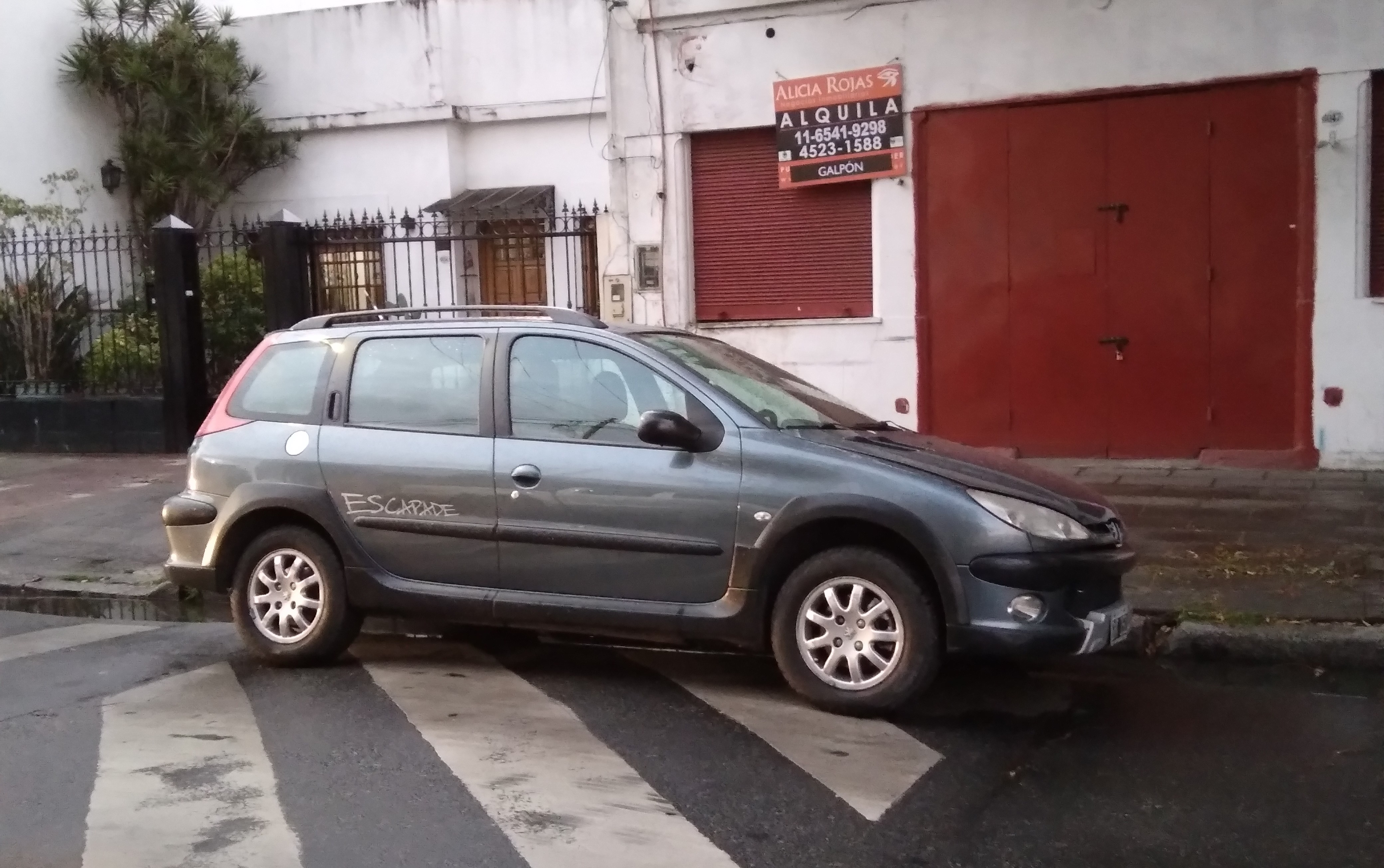
Peugeot 206 Escapade

Following brands like Fiat and Volkswagen, Peugeot sells an off-roader version of the Peugeot 206 in selected South American markets, called the Peugeot 206 Escapade. It is essentially a Peugeot 206 SW station wagon with a rugged SUV-like bodykit and higher and tougher suspension. It is powered with a 1.6L 16v engine.

=== Citroën C2 (T21) ===
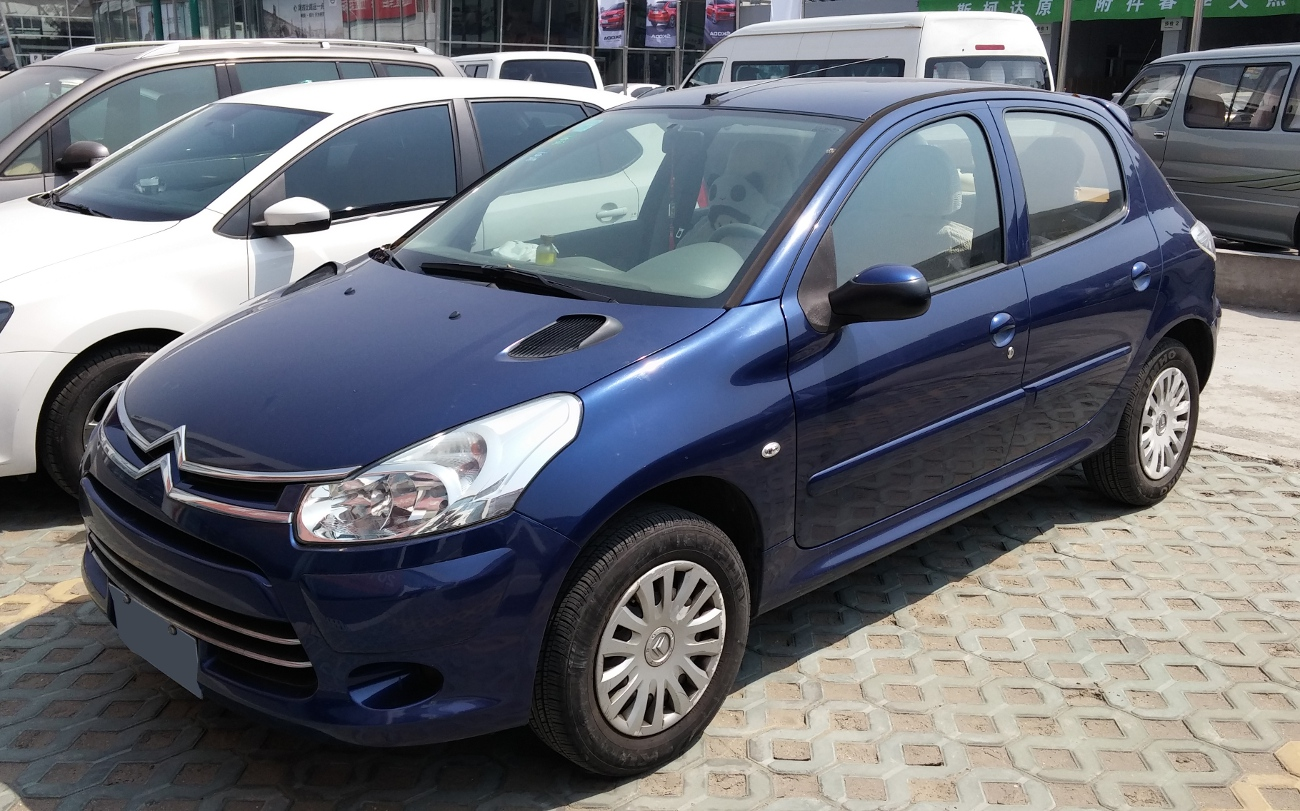
Citroën C2 (front)

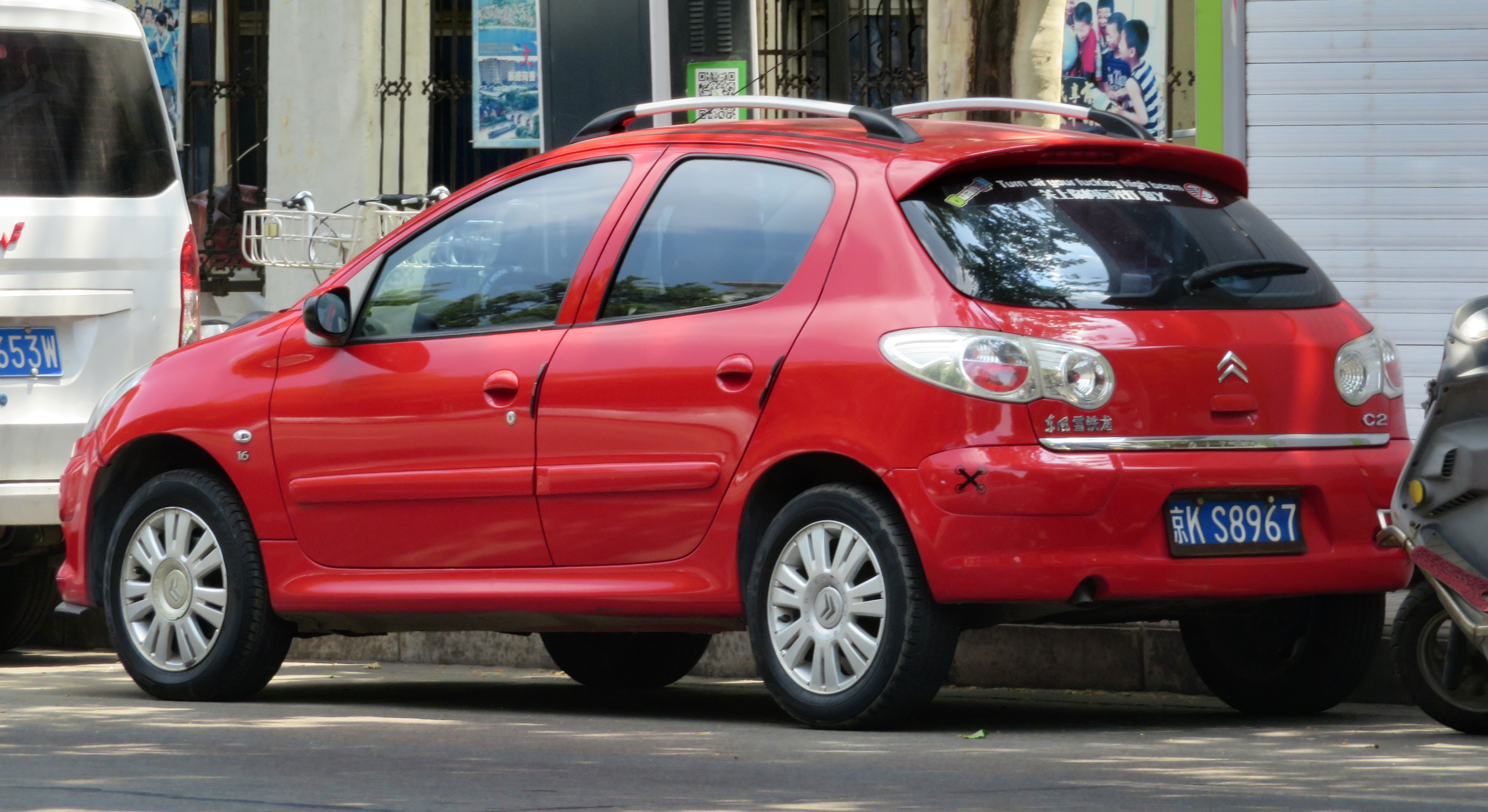
Citroën C2 (rear, pre-facelift)

In November 2006, the Chinese joint venture Dongfeng Peugeot-Citroën launched a derivative version of the Peugeot 206 known as the Citroën C2. While it shares the same nameplate with a European-market model, it is instead a 206 with a modified front and rear body. In 2012, Citroën released a crossover-styled version called the Citroën C2 Cross. Almost 80,000 Citroën C2 were produced in China from 2006 to 2013. For engine options, a 1.4 litre petrol option known as TU3AF is available alongside the 1.6 litre engine known as TU5JP4. The 1.4 litre engine is paired to a 5 speed manual as standard while the 1.6 litre engine is available with both the 5 speed manual transmission or an optional 4 speed automatic.

=== Naza 206 Bestari ===
In Malaysia, the 206 was also marketed under the Naza name. It was sold as the Naza 206 Bestari, and was available in 1.4L petrol engine (TU3JP), and with the option of 5- speed manual transmission and 4-speed automatic transmission (codename AL4). It was replaced by the 206 SD, which was renamed as the 207 in Malaysia.

== Powertrain ==
Petrol engines
Model	Type	Power, Torque@rpm	0–100 km/h (0–62 mph) (s)	Top speed	Transmission	CO_{2} emission (g/km)
D4D	999 cc (61.0 cu in)	51 kW (69 hp; 70 PS) @ 5500, 93 N⋅m (69 lb⋅ft) @ 4200	18.6	144 km/h (89 mph)	BE4	155
TU1JP	1,124 cc (68.6 cu in)	44 kW (59 hp; 60 PS) @ 5500, 94 N⋅m (69 lb⋅ft) @ 2700	15.4	158 km/h (98 mph)	MA5 / AL4	148
TU3JP	1,360 cc (83 cu in)	55 kW (74 hp; 75 PS) @ 5250, 133 N⋅m (98 lb⋅ft) @ 3250	11.9	187 km/h (116 mph)	MA5 / AL4	152
TU3A	1,360 cc (83 cu in)	55 kW (74 hp; 75 PS) @ 5250, 133 N⋅m (98 lb⋅ft) @ 3250	10.8	189 km/h (117 mph)	MA5 / AL4	139
ET3J4	1,360 cc (83 cu in)	66 kW (89 hp; 90 PS) @ 5500, 120 N⋅m (89 lb⋅ft) @ 2800	10.1	193 km/h (120 mph)	MA5 / AL4	145
TU5JP	1,587 cc (96.8 cu in)	66 kW (89 hp; 90 PS) @ 5600, 135 N⋅m (100 lb⋅ft) @ 3000	10	180 km/h (110 mph)	MA5 / BE4 / AL4	171
TU5JP4	1,587 cc (96.8 cu in)	81 kW (108 hp; 110 PS) @ 5800, 147 N⋅m (108 lb⋅ft) @ 4000	10.2	185 km/h (115 mph)	MA5 / BE4 / AL4	171
EW10J4	1,997 cc (121.9 cu in)	101 kW (135 hp; 137 PS) @ 6000, 190 N⋅m (140 lb⋅ft) @ 4100	8.3	210 km/h (130 mph)	BE4 / AL4	185
EW10J4S	1,997 cc (121.9 cu in)	130 kW (175 hp; 177 PS) @ 7000, 202 N⋅m (149 lb⋅ft) @ 4750	7.4	217 km/h (135 mph)	BE4	204
Diesel engine
DW8	1,868 cc (114.0 cu in)	51 kW (69 hp; 70 PS) @ 4600, 125 N⋅m (92 lb⋅ft) @ 2500	15.2	161 km/h (100 mph)	BE4	156
DV4TD	1,398 cc (85.3 cu in)	50 kW (67 hp; 68 PS) @ 4000, 160 N⋅m (118 lb⋅ft) @ 2000	13.1	168 km/h (104 mph)	BE4	112
DW10TD	1,997 cc (121.9 cu in)	66 kW (89 hp; 90 PS) @ 4000, 205 N⋅m (151 lb⋅ft) @ 1900	11.7	180 km/h (110 mph)	BE4	136
DV6TED4	1,560 cc (95 cu in)	80 kW (108 hp; 109 PS) @ 4000, 240 N⋅m (177 lb⋅ft) @ 1750	9.9	186 km/h (116 mph)	BE4	126

== 206+ (T31) ==
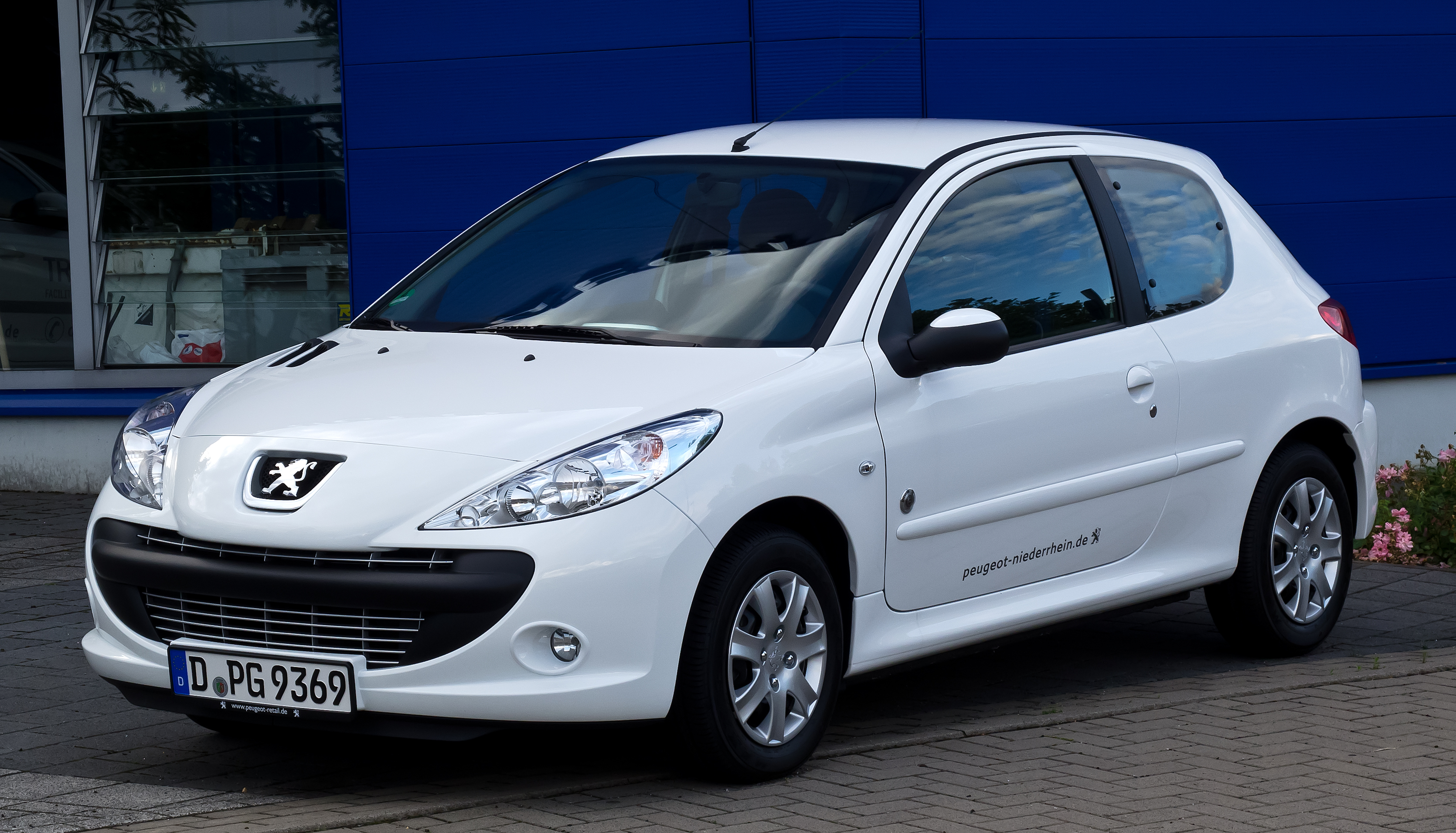
Peugeot 206+, also marketed under the Peugeot 207 nameplate in South America

The 206+ is a facelifted version of the 206, with a new front end and styling, similar to the European 207. It was manufactured in Mulhouse, France, and was launched in February 2009.

In May 2008, Peugeot's Brazilian branch announced it would not manufacture nor import the Peugeot 207 to Brazil, but instead it would change some elements of the 206 already in production, arguing it would be impractical to do otherwise. The car, launched in August 2008, had minor changes to mechanical parts such as the suspension and gearbox. It is marketed between the original 206 and the European 207, having the Volkswagen Fox, Renault Clio Campus and the Chevrolet Agile as its main competitors. It is offered in 3- and 5-door hatchback, estate and 4-door saloon bodystyles, including a facelifted 207 Escapade.

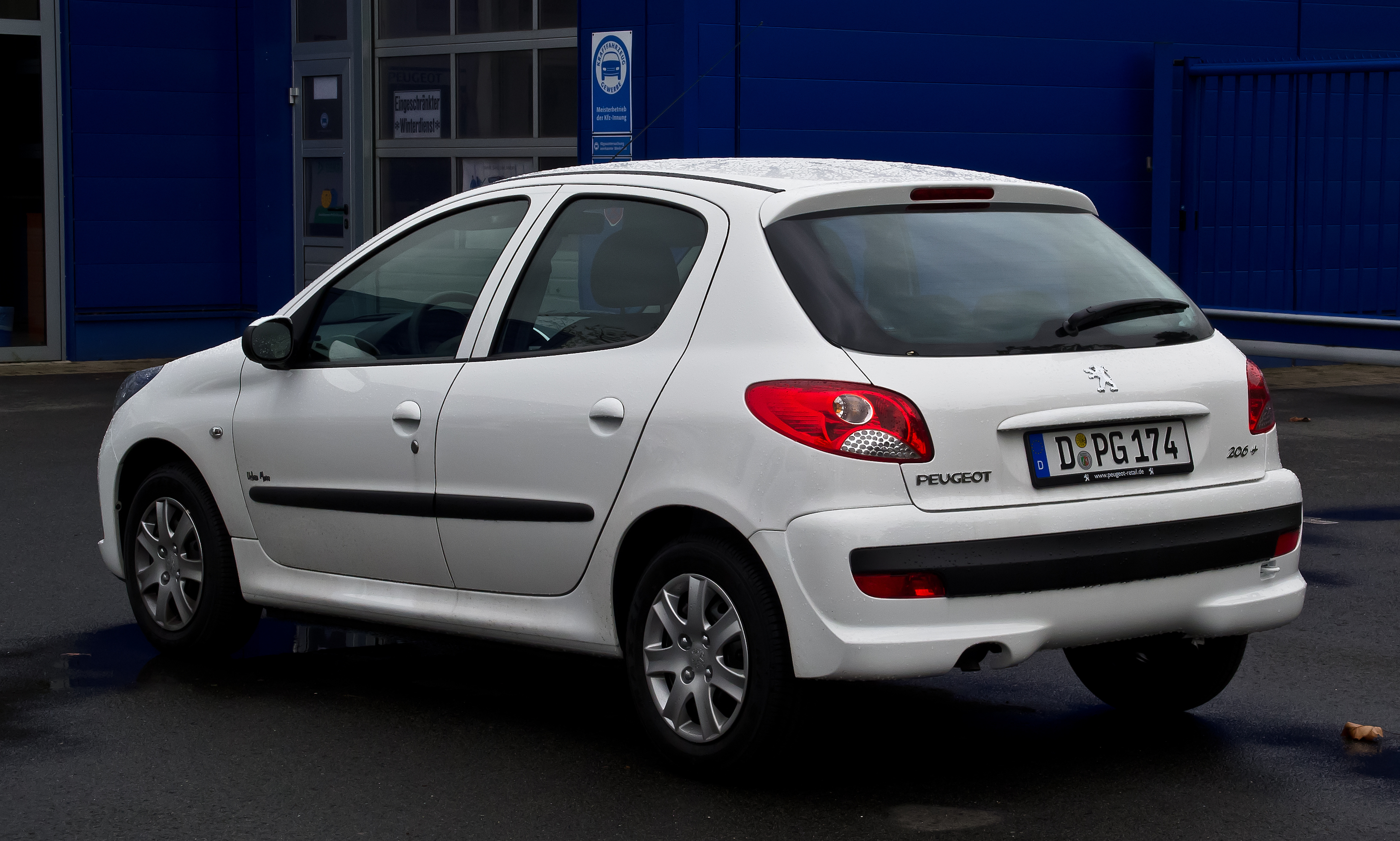
Peugeot 206+ hatchback

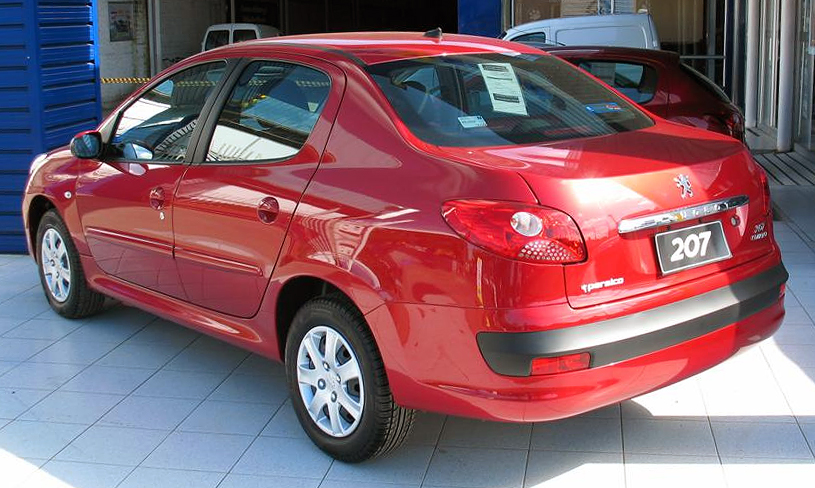
Peugeot 207 Compact Sedan in South America. The saloon version featured the front end of the facelifted 206+

The car is sold under the "207 Compact" nameplate in Argentina (country in which it is also produced) and Uruguay, in order to differentiate it from the European 207 CC and RC, which are also sold in those countries. Peugeot planned to name it "207 Brasil" in Brazil, but soon dropped the "Brasil" from the name, as this decision gained generally negative reactions from the media. The Brazilian 207 has also been criticized because it was perceived essentially as a facelifted 206, despite Peugeot's efforts to market it as an entirely new car and even selling it at a higher base price.

In February 2009, Peugeot announced that this revised model will be made at the Mulhouse plant in France for the European (left-hand drive only) market, badged as the 206+. as a patriotic recession-beating rejoinder to Renault's initiative of importing low priced Dacias from Romania. In May 2009 the company announced the recruitment of an additional 450 workers to support production at Mulhouse of the 206+ and the two door 308 models also assembled at this facility. This plant exported the model under the 207 Compact nameplate to Chile (since 2010), Mexico (2009–2011) and the Dominican Republic.

From October 2010, Naza Group started the assembly of the 207 sedan in Malaysia. It was also exported throughout RHD Southeast Asian and South Asian markets such as Thailand, Indonesia, Brunei, and Sri Lanka.

From May 2013, Peugeot no longer offers the 206+ in Europe due to higher demands of the newer 208 and the introduction of the 207-based 301.

=== Iranian production ===
In March 2010, Iran Khodro Company (IKCO), which produces the Peugeot 206 in Iran since April 2001, announced the production of the "207i" in hatchback version. The annual production target for this locally built 206+ was 15,000–20,000 annually. At the end of year 2011, IKCO's production of the 207i stopped temporary during relation cut between IKCO and Peugeot because of international sanctions against Iran. This was IKCO's main seller and it strongly impacted the company's sales. However, in early 2016 IKCO presented an Iranized model, no longer dependent on French parts, and production restarted. IKCO had redeveloped the 207i using parts manufactured in Iran, India and China and launched the production of a vehicle extremely close to the one supplied by Peugeot. This second series 207i, launched in 2017, has some aesthetic differences (rear lights for example) and additional equipment (rear view camera, infotainment system). It retains the Peugeot badge, despite the rupture of ties between the two companies.

In December 2016, the three-box, automatic-only sedan version of the 207i was presented. Called the 207i SD, it was fitted with the TU5 engine but did not meet sales expectations and was withdrawn in 2019.

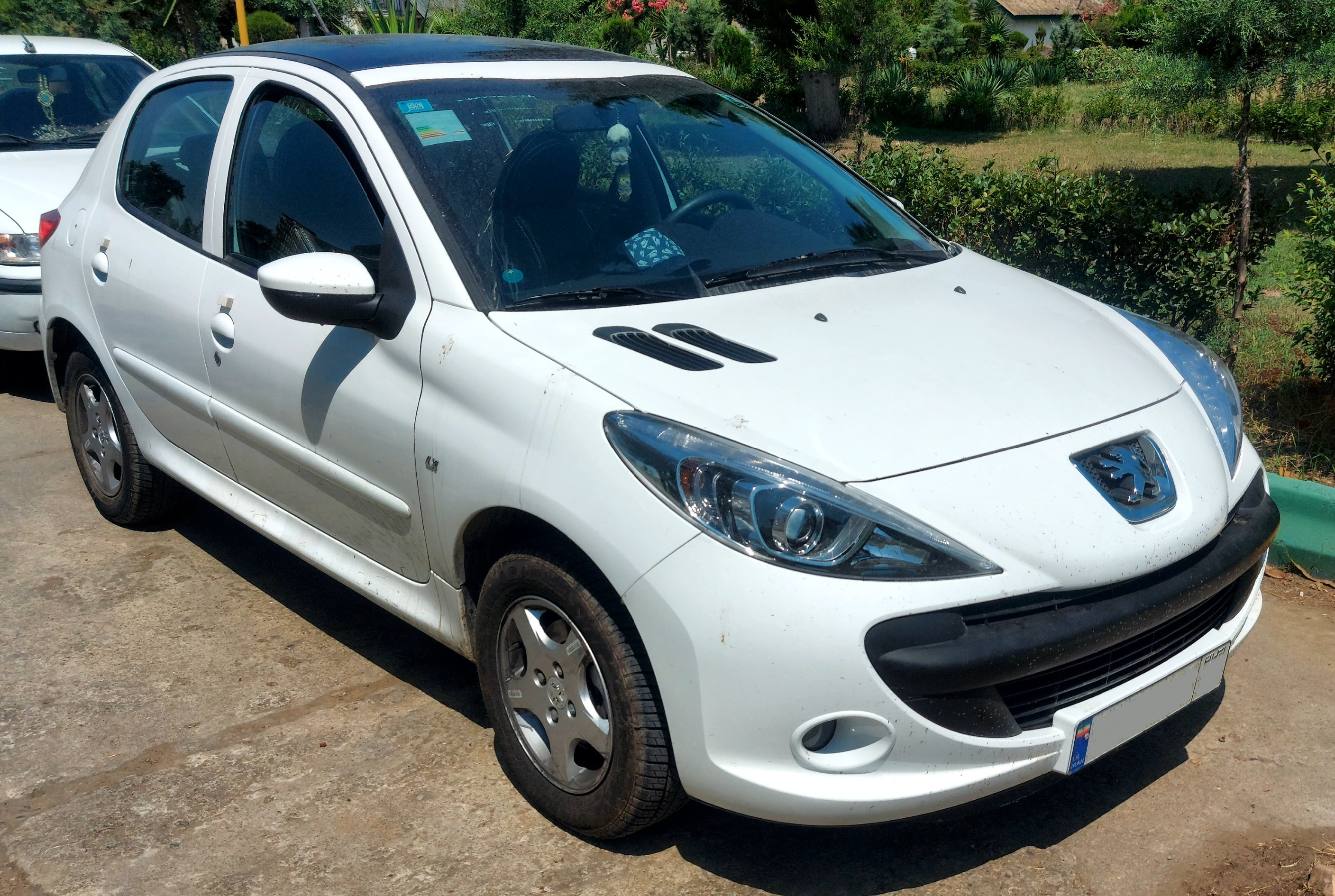
Iran Khodro Peugeot 207i (second series)

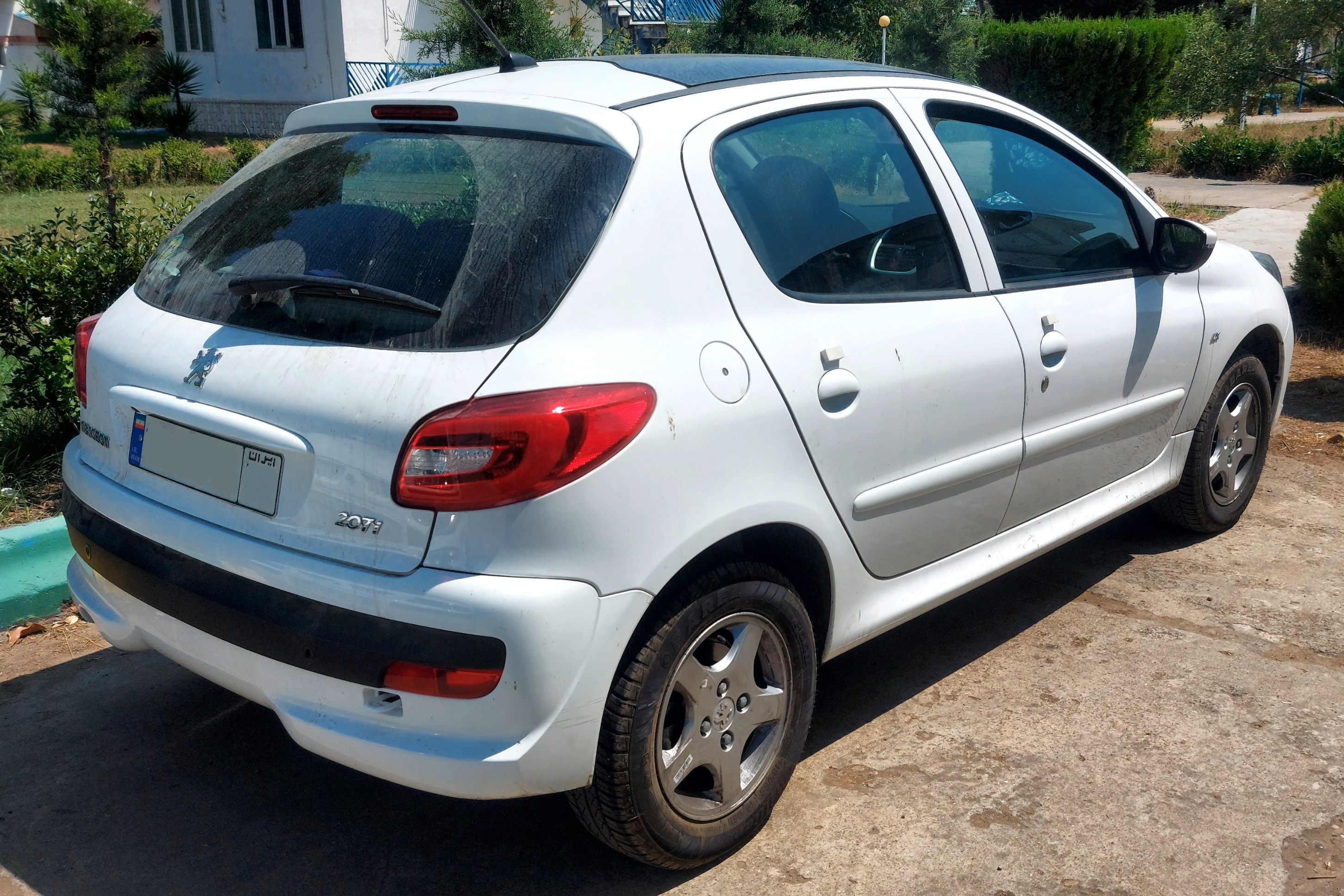
Rear view

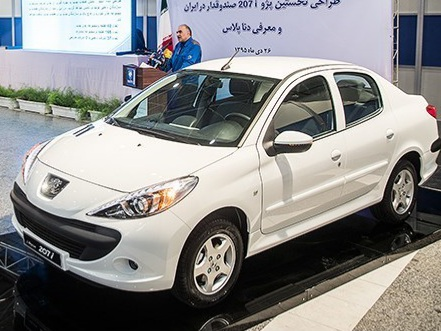
Peugeot 207i SD (2018–2020)

== Safety ==
The 206 in its standard European market configuration received 4 stars for adult occupants and 2 stars for pedestrians from Euro NCAP in 2000.

The 207 Compact in its most basic Latin American market configuration with no airbags received 1 star for adult occupants and 2 stars for toddlers from Latin NCAP 1.0 in 2010.

Latin NCAP 1.0 test results Peugeot 207 Compact + 2 Airbags (2010, based on Euro NCAP 1997)
Test	Points	Stars
Adult occupant:	7.13/17.0	2 /5 stars
Child occupant:	16.26/49.00	2 /5 stars

The 207 Compact in its most basic Latin American market configuration with 2 airbags received 2 stars for adult occupants and 2 stars for toddlers from Latin NCAP 1.0 in 2010.

Latin NCAP 1.0 test results Peugeot 207 Compact 5p 1.4 - NO Airbags (2010, based on Euro NCAP 1997)
Test	Points	Stars
Adult occupant:	6.32/17.0	1 /5 stars
Child occupant:	16.25/49.00	2 /5 stars

== Motorsport ==
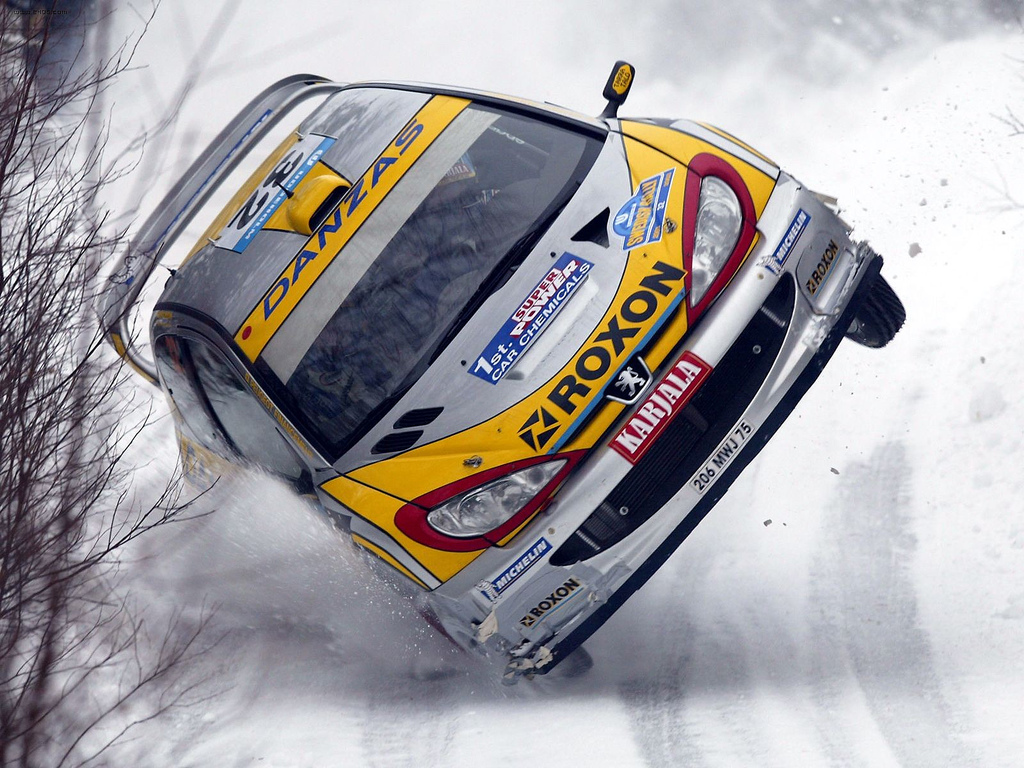
Juuso Pykälistö driving a Peugeot 206 WRC at the 2003 Swedish Rally

In 1999, Peugeot Sport unveiled the 206 WRC, and it competed for the first time in that year's World Rally Championship, with French tarmac veteran and long-time marque stalwart Gilles Panizzi narrowly failing, against a resurgent reigning champion in Mitsubishi's Tommi Mäkinen, to win the Rallye Sanremo. The car was soon a success, however, and won both the manufacturers' and drivers' championships in 2000, Peugeot's first such accolades since their withdrawal from the WRC after Group B was banned after the 1986 season, and achieved in the hands of Panizzi, Francois Delecour and Mäkinen's successor as drivers' world champion, Marcus Grönholm.

For 2001, Grönholm competed alongside two refugees of SEAT's exit from the championship at the end of 2000; compatriot Harri Rovanperä and the French 1994 world champion, Didier Auriol. Rovanperä and Auriol each contributed single wins, on Swedish Rally and Rally Catalunya respectively (the former to be a sole career win for the Finn, and the latter victory helped by assorted problems for the blisteringly quick debuting Citroën Xsara WRCs), before Auriol left the team at the end of the season. Grönholm, meanwhile, suffered sufficient reliability woes in the first half of the year such that he could manage no higher than fourth overall in the series, although Peugeot did fend off Ford, with a 1–2 result by the two Finns on the season-ending Rally of Great Britain to successfully defend the constructors' championship title.

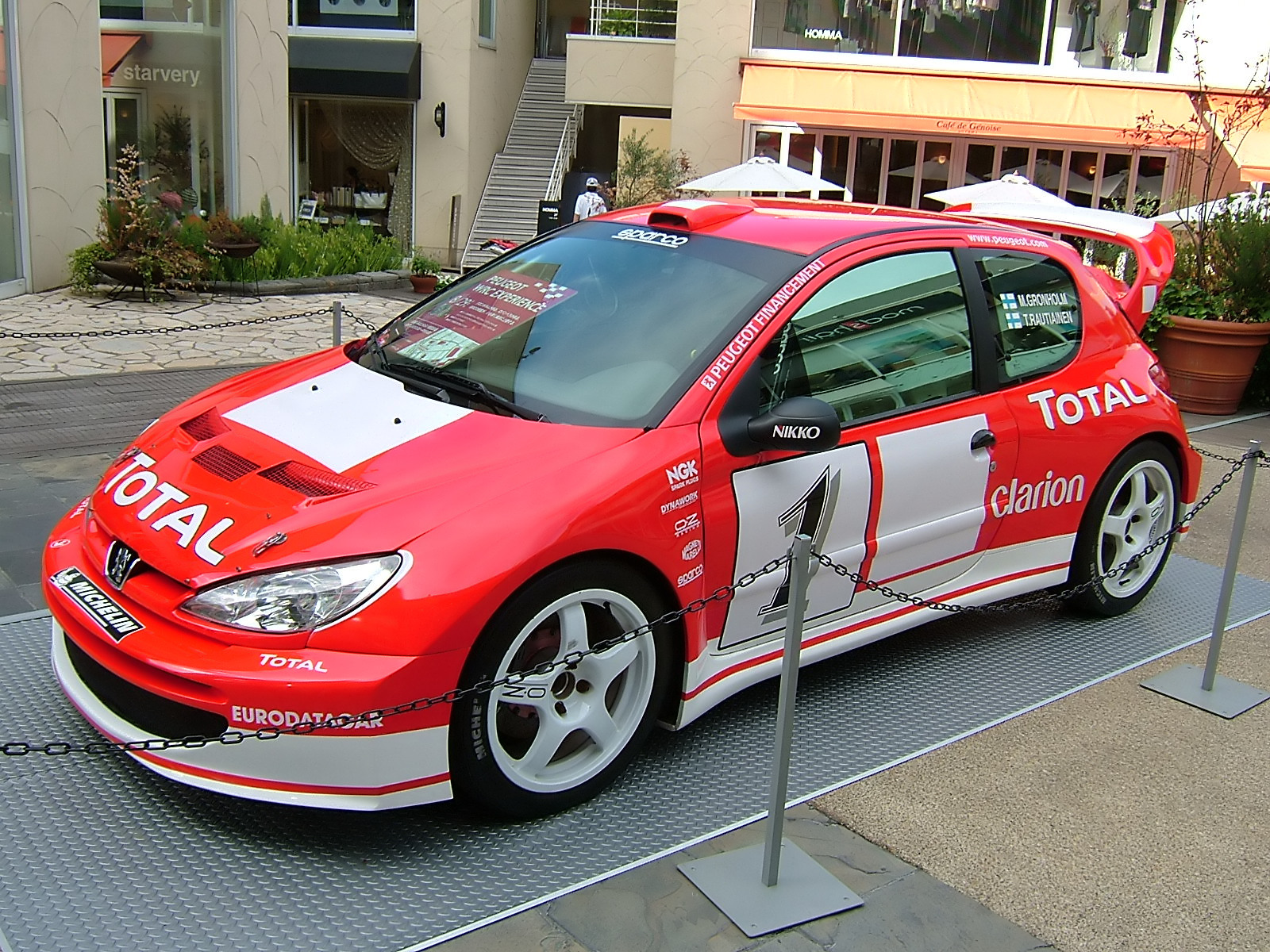
Grönholm's 2003 206 WRC on display

In 2002, Grönholm – despite it became paired in the factory line-up with defending 2001 champion from Subaru, the Briton Richard Burns – led Peugeot to a repeat of the WRC title double aboard his 206 WRC. His dominance that year was compared to Michael Schumacher's dominance of Formula One. In summary, Peugeot won two drivers' championships, in 2000 and 2002, and three manufacturers' titles in a row between 2000 and 2002. However, by 2003 the 206 WRC was beginning to show its age and was less effective against the competition, notably the newer Xsara WRC and the Subaru Impreza WRC, so it was retired from competition at the end of the season, to be replaced with the 307 WRC, albeit, unlike its predecessor, based not on the production version's hatchback, but its coupé cabriolet body style.

The Peugeot 206 WRC was awarded the Autosport "Rally Car of the Year" in 2002, preceded by the Ford Focus RS WRC and followed by the Citroën Xsara WRC.

In 2002, Peugeot GB created the Peugeot 206 Cup, a one-make rally championship aimed at young drivers. The championship was created to help young drivers develop their careers. The cars were built by Vic Lee Racing and drivers such as Tom Boardman, Luke Pinder and Garry Jennings all drove in the championship. A similar championship also existed in France.

== Advertising ==
In 2003, Peugeot launched a popular television commercial for the Peugeot 206 directed by Matthijs van Heijningen, with Creative Direction by Roberto Greco and Giovanni Porro from Euro RSCG of Milan-Italy, known as "The Sculptor", involved a young man in India who sees the 206 advertised in a magazine and then goes about damaging a Hindustan Ambassador (including having an elephant sit on it) and then spending the night welding it. The following day, the car emerges as an exact replica of the 206's shape – except with many dents and discolorations. The man then takes his 206 replica driving with friends, with many interested onlookers. The track playing is "Heaven Is A Place On Earth" by Raja Mushtaq, later remixed as "Husan", by Bhangra Knights.

The commercial won a number of prestigious international advertising awards:

1. Gold, Cannes Lions International Festival of Creativity 2003, Cars category.
2. Gold, Clio Awards 2003, Product/Service: Automotive category.
3. Gold, ADC*E 2003, TV Commercials category.
4. The Cresta Awards 2003.
5. Grand Prix, International Car Advertising Film Festival 2002.
6. Grand Prix, Caucasus International Festival of Advertisement (CIFA) 2002.
7. Gold, Caucasus International Festival of Advertisement (CIFA) 2002.
8. Epica d’Or, EPICA (Europe's Premier Creative Awards) 2002.
9. Gold, EPICA (Europe's Premier Creative Awards) 2002, Automobiles category.
10. Grand Prix, Eurobest - The European Advertising Festival 2002.

In March 2018, the commercial was recreated in celebration of the 206's 20th anniversary. The commercial is essentially similar to the original, except that the Ambassador became a replica of the Peugeot 208 GTI.

== Awards ==
- "The Most Beautiful Car of the Year 1998", Festival Automobile International, 1998.
- "Best Petrol Small Car" and "Best Diesel Small Car", Fleet Excellence Awards, 2001
- "Best Convertible" (Peugeot 206CC), What Car? awards, 2001.
- "Best Used Supermini", What Car? magazine, 2001.
- "Car of the Show" (Peugeot 206CC), British International Motor Show, 2000.
- "Best-Selling Car in Europe 2001-2003".

== Production and sales ==
=== Production milestone ===
Cars produced	Date
500,000	September 1999
2,000,000	August 2001
3,000,000	January 2003
4,000,000	January 2004
5,000,000	May 2005
6,000,000	April 2007
8,358,217	December 2012

=== Sales ===
Year	Europe	Brazil	Argentina	China
1999	458,411			
2000	555,180		17,414	
2001	627,370	25,485	10,147	
2002	594,585	39,166	4,925	
2003	551,481	33,139	_	
2004	539,037	36,431	_	
2005	429,702	42,867	_	
2006	230,866	47,380	_	29,449
2007	85,656	55,850	27,675	28,558
2008	61,183	41,985	26,253	14,593
2009	112,789	6,645	_	3,482
2010	121,695	60	5,881	3
2011	84,030		6,760	2,081
2012	41,584		4,747	
2013	2,462		565	
2014	43			

=== 207-207 Compact Sales ===
Year	Brazil	Argentina
2008	18,608	
2009	57,383	25,350
2010	68,690	29,613
2011	59,056	33,724
2012	41,601	28,903
2013	14,919	29,236
2014	4,297	11,653
2015	74	7,008
2016		5,437
2017		134

== See also ==
- Citroën C3
- IKCO Runna
- Peugeot 207
- Peugeot 205
