= Malaysian hip-hop =

Hip hop music performed in Malaysia

Malaysian hip hop
- Stylistic origins: Hip hop
- Cultural origins: Late 1980s and early 1990s, Kuala Lumpur, Malaysia

Other topics
- Malaysian pop

The Malaysian hip hop is a hip hop music performed in Malaysia. A few acts initially began performing within a limited urban demographic mostly in English, but the genre was only began to be taken seriously nationwide by rhyming in the Malay(sian) language for a wider reach as the Malaysian music market is fragmented by language.

== History ==
Malaysian hip hop music started in the late 1980s and early 1990s with rap groups such as KRU, 4U2C, NICO (later Nico G), Naughtius Maximus, and HQA. Their so-called "rap music" was not accepted by the mainstream media which was dominated by government-owned stations; 4U2C gathered a cult following despite this while other acts had to change to a more pop-ish sound. In 1991, local rapper HQA released the classic album Baguvix. At around the same time, another group called Krash Kozz was the only group to introduce the new jack swing hip hop sound to Malaysian listeners, but they disbanded after their third album, New Jack the Street Beat was released.

Nico G produced Malaysia's first fully Malay-language fully rap album in 1993. KRU's albums Canggih (1992, mixed with pop) and reKRUed (1993) were heavily influenced by contemporaries MC Hammer and Vanilla Ice.

Malaysian 1990s were trying times, when the pioneers of the local hip hop scene were trying hard to break the monotony of rock music, love ballads and pop sounds, which are staples in the Malaysian music scene, with the fans of these genres refusing to accept this new form of music. However, the younger generation, especially those in the urban areas, were more curious and receptive; they were more positively in-tuned to receive this new culture that was creating waves across the globe, which was further expedited and cemented by the introduction of records from American hip hop artists like the N.W.A, Brand Nubian, Gang Starr, Cypress Hill, and many others.

In 1994, Naughtius Maximus, Malaysia's first genuine hip hop collective, was formed by the merger of four hip hop groups - Whyness, Deceased, Reffugeez and Under Pressure. A year later, they release their only self-titled album which was touted as Malaysia's first genuine hip hop album. However, not long after its release, Malaysian public broadcaster Radio Televisyen Malaysia (RTM) banned 9 of the album's 13 tracks because it is too "westernized". As a result, Naughtius Maximus disbanded in 1996 with some of its members left to pursue their studies and concentrated on their own careers. The group later reformed with only Mista Rem, Spit and Jungle Jerry as the remaining members but disbanded again in 2000.

The Malaysian music scene was dominated by these poppy-sounding groups until 1995–1996, when Poetic Ammo—composed of Yogi B, Point Blanc, C. Loco and Land Slyde—came out with their album It's a Nice Day to Be Alive. Their first hit, "Everything Changes", revolutionized the local music industry. There were also groups from the underground scene that have established themselves such as The Rebel Scum, but it was Poetic Ammo that "made it big". Yogi B's repertoire in general pioneered the subculture of Malaysian Indian hip-hop which developed as a medium of grievances for the socioeconomically disenfranchised Indian community as well as expressions of cultural pride.

One of the "powerhouses" of hip hop in Malaysia is Too Phat, which consists of Malique and Joe Flizzow. They were signed to EMI International's Positive Tone division and produced their first hit album, Whutthadilly?, and their first single was "Too Phat Baby".

Hip-hop has come a long way in Malaysia as seen from its growing industry and the success it has garnered in the mainstream music landscape. In 2010, three of Malaysia's biggest rappers—SonaOne, Joe Flizzow and Altimet—collaborated on a track called "Who Do It Better". In the song, Altimet, who was wearing an Eric B & Rakim T-shirt, raps in Malay about being schooled by hip-hop's earliest stars. In 2014, Joe Flizzow and SonaOne worked together on a track called "Apa Khabar" that talks about how far hip-hop has come in Malaysia. The track won two national music awards. That same year, SonaOne, was awarded the best song for "No More", the first time an English song managed to clinch the title at the Malaysian Anugerah Industri Muzik.

== Hip hop record labels ==
- Kartel Records

== See also ==
- Music of Malaysia
- Malaysian pop
