= Return of tha' Boombox =

Studio album by Poetic Ammo
- Released: 15 December 2002
- Recorded: 2001 – 2002
- Studios: Playtime Studios; Synchrosound Studios
- Genres: Hip-hop; rap
- Length: 63:20
- Labels: Positive Tone; EMI Music Malaysia
- Producer: Yogi B

Poetic Ammo chronology
The World is Yours (2000)	Return of tha' Boombox (2002)	The Best of Poetic Ammo (2004)

Singles from Return of tha' Boombox
- 1. "Asian Stylez" Released: 2002; 2. "Monay Monay" Released: 2003

Return of tha' Boombox is a third and final studio album by Malaysian hip hop group, Poetic Ammo, released on 15 December 2002 by Positive Tone and EMI Music Malaysia.

== Production ==
Return of tha' Boombox was heavily influenced by Poetic Ammo. It is their first release as a duo, following the departure of their two original members Landslyde and C. Loco in 2001 after recorded their first two albums with the group, leaving Yogi B and Point Blanc as the remaining members. Like their debut album, It's a Nice Day to Be Alive (1998), the album includes numerous interludes. They were joined by guest artistes like Amylene @ Shorti, Reefa and Azan Addin, a member of Malaysian R&B group, Ruffedge.

== Release and reception ==
The album was released on 15 December 2002, with "Asian Stylez" and "Monay, Monay" released as lead singles.

The album earned the group two nominations at the 11th Anugerah Industri Muzik, but didn't won any awards.

== Track listing ==
No.	Title	Length
1.	"Return of tha' Boombox" (intro; feat. DJ Fuzz)	0:58
2.	"Live and Die Wit' Us" (feat. DJ Fuzz)	4:23
3.	"Whaddup?!!" (Interlude)	0:16
4.	"Monay, Monay" (feat. Reefa)	3:21
5.	"Ride Tonite" (feat. Amylene @ Shorti)	4:05
6.	"At tha' Showers" (Interlude)	1:24
7.	"Sum'a y'all" (feat. Azan of Ruffedge)	4:45
8.	"Raksasa di Pagi Ahad" (Interlude)	2:27
9.	"Sum'in Still On"	3:38
10.	"Let Yo' Man Know" (feat. Reefa)	4:16
11.	"Ammo fo' Life" (Interlude)	0:26
12.	"Feel Yo' Head Go Bang" (feat. MC Deeb and MC Tell-a-Tale)	3:15
13.	"Asian Stylez"	3:30
14.	"I Pay Mah' Bills" (Interlude)	0:22
15.	"No Luv" (feat. Shorti)	3:28
16.	"Mistah' Yogi B" (feat. Shorti)	3:32
17.	"No Refund" (Outro)	0:34
18.	"Don't Try This at Home" (Bonus track)	10:12
Total length:		63:20

== Release history ==
Region	Date	Format	Label
Malaysia	15 December 2002	CD, Digital download	Positive Tone, EMI Music Malaysia
