= Malaysian popular music =

- Native name: Pop Malaysia
- Other names: M-pop
- Stylistic origins: Pop; ballad; Malaysian folk music; hip hop; EDM; R&B; rock
- Cultural origins: 1920s Malaysia
- Typical instruments: Standard instruments used in popular music genres

Malaysian popular music, sometimes called Malaysian pop (Malay: Pop Malaysia) or abbreviated as M-pop, refers to popular music forms in the Southeast Asian nation of Malaysia. Although pop music in various languages, such as Mandopop, is popular and has been produced in Malaysia, Malaysian pop refers to music recorded primarily in the Malay language in Malaysia.

Malaysian pop covers a diversity of genres, such as pop, ballad, Malaysian folk, hip hop, EDM, R&B, and rock.

== Origin and influences ==
Bangsawan theatre in Penang c. 1895

Malaysian popular music has its origin in local musical traditions and popular European music styles. Some early musical styles, performers, and songs of kroncong and lagu-lagu rakyat (folk songs) were common to the musical cultures of Malaysia and Indonesia. Starting in the 1920s, local social dance and entertainment music such as asli, inang, joget, dondang sayang, zapin, and masri were adapted by bangsawan troupes to Anglo-American dance band arrangements but retained a local folk character, eventually developing into modern Malay popular music. Bangsawan troupes originated in the 19th century as a form of opera called wayang parsi that developed as an adaptation of Persian theatre brought to Malaya by performers from Bombay. They portrayed stories from diverse groups such as Indian, Western, Islamic, Chinese, Indonesian, and Malay, with music, dance, and costumed acting. The musicians were mostly local Malays, Filipinos, and Goans, and they often incorporated Chinese, Middle Eastern, and Indian elements in their songs.

Western popular music has continually influenced Malaysian popular music since its early days. In the pre-World War II era, songs based on Anglo-American and Latin American dance music sung in Malay were popular. These songs were accompanied by dance bands that became known as orkes Melayu (Malay orchestra). The orkes Melayu, which influenced dangdut, was played at dance halls in amusement parks, bangsawan shows, and other festivities. Early singers were often Filipinos originally brought to Malaya by the British to form the Selangor State Band, a military band. In the 1960s and 1970s, influenced by Western rock bands, a modified rock combo called kugiran (an acronym of "kumpulan gitar rancak", meaning rhythmic guitar bands) often accompanied singers. From the 1970s to the 1980s, a Western orchestral sound also became popular as musical accompaniment on albums, which is widely assumed to be due to the influence of RTM Orchestra.

== History ==
=== Early era ===
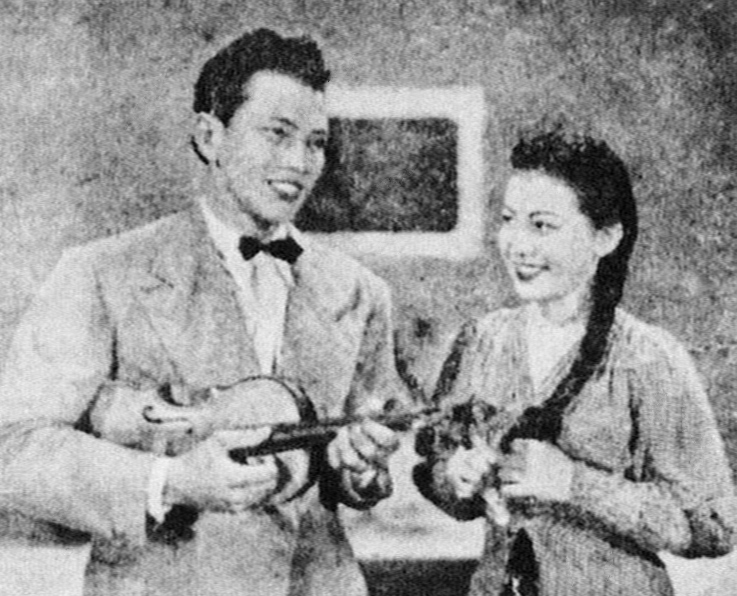
P. Ramlee and Kasma Booty, 1950

The first recording of music in Malaya was made 1903 by Fred Gaisberg of the Gramophone Company, who was sent to record local music in Asia. During the colonial period, Singapore was the centre of the Malay music industry, and recordings were done at the EMI studio there, but the centre began to shift to Kuala Lumpur after Malayan independence in 1957, especially after the separation of Singapore in 1965. Until the 1960s, few records were produced locally, and recordings of the singers and film stars done in Malaya were pressed in India and the records sent back to Malaya for sale.

One of the earliest modern Malay pop songs was "Tudung Periok", sung by Momo Latiff, who recorded it in the 1930s. Many singers became popular through Malay films in the early era. In the 1940s and 1950s, this included P. Ramlee and Saloma. Some of these singers had bangsawan or kroncong background. The songs of this era were influenced by foreign music styles such as those of Latin American dance, Hawaiian music, and Indian films. They were also mostly romantic in nature, in what might be called the hatimu hatiku ("your heart, my heart") style, and for decades, Malay pop music was dominated by songs with words like sayang (love), cinta (love), and gadis (girl) in the title.

P. Ramlee, whose career spanned a period from the late 1940s through to the early 1970s, became the most popular Malay singer and composer. It has been estimated that he wrote over a thousand songs and recorded around five hundred, some of which still remain popular today.

=== 1960s: Pop yeh-yeh ===
In the 1960s, Western pop music was particularly influential on local music scenes in Malaysia, Singapore, and Brunei. When Cliff Richard and the Shadows played in Singapore in 1961, he inspired many copycat acts, and public viewings of Richard's films in the region were often augmented with local cover bands emulating his songs. One particular genre influenced by Western guitar bands, called pop yeh-yeh came to the forefront and ruled the Malay music scene from 1965 to 1971. This genre was influenced by the music and fashion of the Beatles and other British rock and roll bands during the 1960s. In fact, the term pop yeh-yeh was taken from the choral refrain of the popular Beatles song "She Loves You" ("she loves you, yeah-yeah-yeah"); southern European yé-yé music has the same etymology.

=== 1970s–1980s ===
DJ Dave, Hail Amir, and Uji Rashid introduced Hindustani-influenced music to Malaysia in the 1970s. Although the Jayhawkers, led by Joe Chelliah, was the first wholly non-Malay pop band to record Malay pop songs, it was in the mid-1970s that later non-Malay musicians ventured into the local music industry. Bands like Alleycats, Headwind, Discovery, Carefree, and Cenderawasih took the lead to modernize Malaysian pop music, together with solo artists such as Sudirman Arshad and Sharifah Aini. A blending with Indonesian pop also occurred, as artists like Broery and Titiek Puspa gained their own Malaysian fanbases. Towards the end of the decade, bands delving into blues, like Blues Gang (who notably sang in the Negeri Sembilan dialect) and hard rock, like Sweet Charity, from Singapore, emerged. Malaysian-French singer Shake debuted in 1976 in France and continued his career in Malaysia in the early 1980s.

Jamal Abdillah rose to fame in the 1980s, following in the footsteps of Sudirman Arshad. He was joined by Aman Shah, Shidee, Nassier Wahab, and Rahim Maarof. In 1985, Sheila Majid debuted with an album titled Dimensi Baru, which proved popular. The decade also saw the emergence of Ramlah Ram. Toward the end of the 1980s, singer Aishah gained fame first in New Zealand with her band, Aishah and the Fan Club, and later in Malaysia.

M. Nasir, previously of the Singaporean folk rock band Kembara, played a leading role in shaping rock music in Malaysia for a period of almost ten years, working as a songwriter and producer. He produced local rock bands like Search and Wings as well as solo artists like Rahim Maarof.

=== 1990s ===
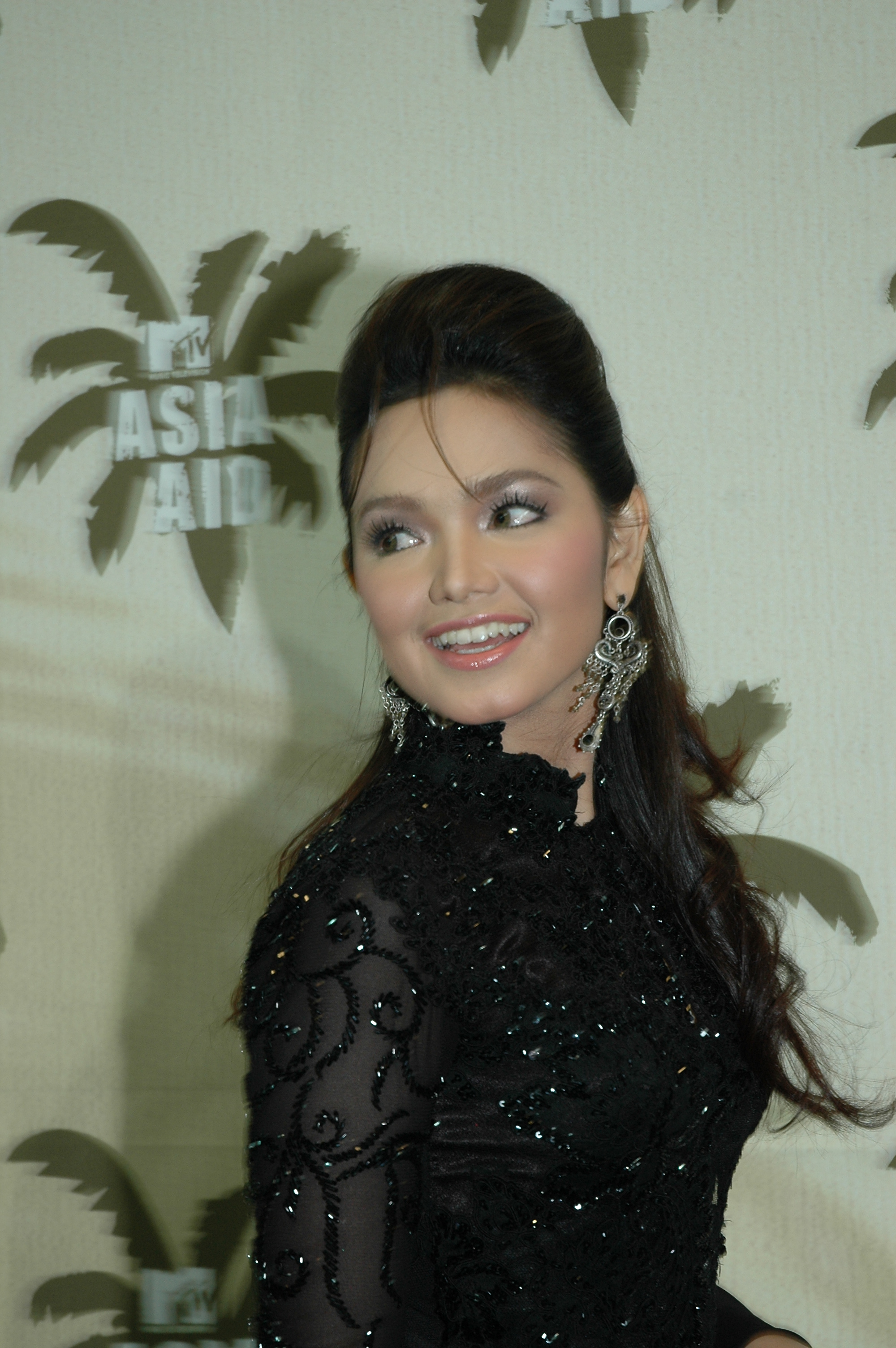
Siti Nurhaliza, dubbed a Malaysian pop princess

In 1991, Zainalabidin—who was a member of the rock act Headwind—released a self-titled solo album, incorporating elements of world music, with lyrics that carried social and environmental commentary. It was critically acclaimed and commercially successful, its songs considered a refreshing break from the melancholic rock ballads that were prevalent at the time.

Local hip hop also began to flourish, with the success of groups such as 4U2C and KRU.

Other popular artists during this decade included Aris Ariwatan, Fauziah Latiff, Aishah, Hattan, Awie, Ziana Zain, Ning Baizura, Ella, Amy Mastura, Sheila Majid, Rahim Maarof, Jamal, M. Nasir, and Aris, along with pop bands such as Ukays, Slam, and Spring.

Traditional musical elements also began to creep into Malaysian pop music, such as dangdut, with best-selling albums from singers like Iwan, Amelina, Mas Idayu, Noraniza Idris, To'ki, and M. Nasir.

In 1996, a schoolgirl by the name of Siti Nurhaliza from the rural town of Kuala Lipis, Pahang, released a pop melayu album produced by Adnan Abu Hassan, which proved a huge success.

The nasyid genre also broke onto the mainstream market from the mid-1990s until the early 2000s. The style, which uses only vocals and percussion, was developed by groups such as Raihan, Rabbani, and Brothers.

=== 2000s–present: reality TV and internet influences ===
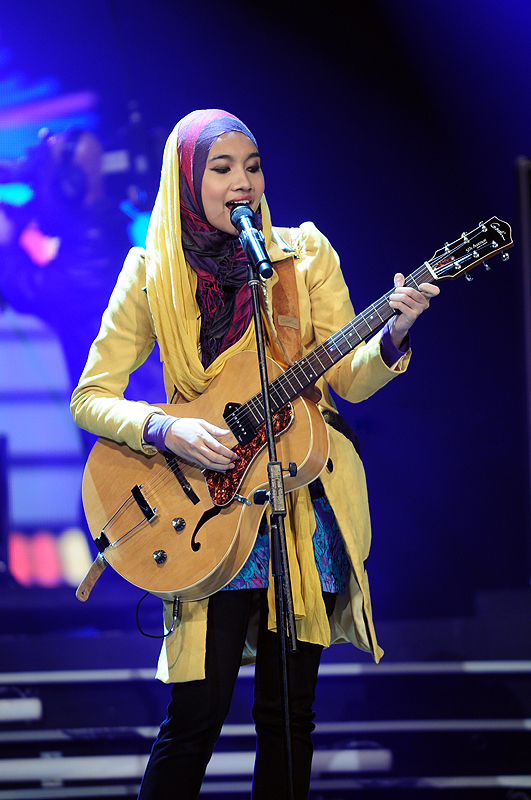
Yuna performing in 2010

In the 2000s, Malaysian popular music moved toward progressive pop composition, with singers like Siti Nurhaliza, Liza Hanim, Dayang Nurfaizah, and Misha Omar, many of whom were discovered and eventually produced by Adnan Abu Hassan. Anuar Zain, who had begun his adult singing career in the late 1990s, rose to fame in the following decade. Several boy bands also joined the ranks of pop superstars during this time, including Innuendo, Indigo, Option 1, Ruffedge, VE, Voice of Men, and Phyne Ballerz.

Audiences developed an interest in pop rock during the 2000s as well, with notable artists including Exists, Spider, OAG, Flop Poppy, Butterfingers, Def Gab C, Pretty Ugly, Ezlynn, Elyana, and Ajai & Nurul.

During the mid-2000s, the introduction of the reality television concept revived public interest in music entertainment. Shows such as Akademi Fantasia and Malaysian Idol allowed the public to vote for their favourite musicians usings their phones. Some of the names who gained prominence this way include Jaclyn Victor, Mawi, Stacy Anam, Aizat Amdan, Akim Ahmad, and Hafiz Suip.

In the late 2000s, various unsigned Malaysian artists rose to fame thanks to YouTube, including Najwa Latif, Elizabeth Tan, Sufian Suhaimi, and Khai Bahar. Indie bands such as Hujan, Gerhana Skacinta, and Bunkface also gained a following, as did singer-songwriter Yunalis Zarai.

In the 2010s, YouTube introduced Malaysian audiences to new musical genres, such as J-pop and K-pop. The latter's worldwide success influenced record companies to try and repackage the successful Malaysian boy band and girl group formulas from the 1990s, such as KRU, Feminin, and 4U2C. Contemporary musicians within this genre include All Star Jefri, Dolla, V.I.P, Max 24:7, Gula-Gula, Forteen, P.O.P, and TIGA.

Dangdut made a comeback in the 2010s, with names like Shiha Zikir, Syura Badron, and Baby Shima Megat, who obtained record deals with Indonesian labels.

Dance genres and hip hop also remained popular, with such prominent artists as SonaOne, Defam, Aman Ra, Yonnyboi, K-Clique, Kid Santhe, Nanasheme, Ismail Izzani, As'ad Motawh, Andi Bernadee, and Naim Daniel.

== See also ==
- Music of Malaysia
- Malaysian hip hop
- Malaysian rock
- Pop kreatif
