= Untukmu =

Studio album by Feminin
- Released: 16 July 1993
- Recorded: 1992 – 1993
- Studio: Suara Studio
- Genres: Pop, R&B, hip-hop
- Length: 44:32
- Label: New Southern
- Producers: Susan Goh; KRU

Feminin chronology
Untukmu (1993)	Kini (1994)

Singles from Untukmu
- 1. "Untukmu" Released: 1993

Untukmu (For You) is the debut studio album by Malaysian girl group, Feminin, released on 26 July 1993 by New Southern Records. The album, which had an old school hip-hop influences, was well-received and propelling Feminin to fame. A digitally remastered reissue of the album was released in 2015 as part of its 22nd anniversary.

== Background and production ==
Feminin was a Malaysian girl group from Kuala Lumpur, consisting of sisters Asfarina and Ruzilawati Muhamad, Nor Intan Zanariah Abdul Zaharin, Andriaty Abdul Rahman and Nor Askiela Zainal Abidin. They started out as a dance group under Edriss Collection, managed by Edriss Razhe, where they auditioned for the 1991 Malaysia Fiesta. The members of the group were approached by the New Southern Records (NSR) and offered them a chance to record their first studio album.

Working with KRU and several other composers and record producers, including Yogi B (who later become part of Poetic Ammo), Feminin recorded Untukmu, with the recording was done primarily at Suara Studio in Kuala Lumpur. Man Keedal and David Yee played the guitar and bass respectively for the songs "Syurga di Dunia" and "Selamat Tinggal Cinta". The album's musical style were rendered as old school hip-hop, which the group described suitable for their album's concept. For the album, they have their shortened haircut to follow the 1970s image. The album was produced by Susan Goh and KRU, mixed and mastered by Ivan Lim and Richard Goh. Untukmu is the last album Feminin recorded and released before the departure of one of its founding member, Along, and also their last release as a quintet.

== Release and reception ==
Untukmu was released on 26 July 1993, with the titular song released as its lead single. Three music videos were produced for the album, for the songs "Rentak Disco 1,2,3", "Rentak Hip Hop" and the title track. The music video for "Untukmu" was filmed in some locations in Kuala Lumpur, particularly the KTM Kuala Lumpur railway station. The album was well-received and sold 100,000 copies upon its release, a record for a work by a female Malaysian music group. It also received any critical praise upon its release.

== Track listing ==
No.	Title	Writer(s)	Length
1.	"Feminin"	Yusry Abd Halim, Norman Abd Halim	3:12
2.	"Untukmu"	KRU	5:13
3.	"Rentak Disco 1, 2, 3"	Copyright Controlled, Cahaya Pena	4:12
4.	"Syurga Di Dunia"	Yusry Abd Halim, Norman Abd Halim	4:12
5.	"Selamat Tinggal Cinta"	Yusry Abdul Halim, Norman Abdul Halim	5:12
6.	"Irama Hip Hop"	Jojo, Yogi B	3:45
7.	"Al Kisah... Sejarah Melayu"	Tradisional, Cahaya Pena	5:20
8.	"Remaja"	Jojo, Cahaya Pena	4:22
9.	"Wawasan Remaja"	Amin Syed, Chief	4:00
10.	"Sahabat"	Amin Syed, Jihan Nawawi	3:20
Total length:			44:32

Notes

- "Untukmu" contains a sample from "Back to Life (However Do You Want Me)" (Club Mix), performed by Soul II Soul.
- "Rentak Disco 1,2,3" contains an interpolation of "Twilight Zone", performed by 2 Unlimited.
- "Al-Kisah... Sejarah Melayu" contains a sample from "Lancang Kuning", performed by Sulaiman Sjafe'i, and an interpolation of "Funky President (People It's Bad)", performed by James Brown.

== Certifications ==
Country	Certification	Sales/Shipments
Malaysia	2x Platinum	100,000

== Release history ==
Region	Date	Format	Label
Malaysia	26 July 1993	CD, Digital download	New Southern Records
