= Poetic Ammo =

Malaysian musical group

- Origin: Kuala Lumpur, Malaysia
- Genres: Rap, hip-hop
- Years active: 1996–2004
- Label: Positive Tone
- Past members: Yogi B Landslyde; C. Loco; Point Blanc

Poetic Ammo (previously known as PMO or Poetic Ammunition) was a Malaysian rap/hip-hop group. It consisted of Yogeswaran Veerasingam (aka Yogi B), Chandrakumar Balakrishnan (aka Land Slyde), Nicholas Ong (aka Point Blanc), and Sashi Kumar Balakrishnan (aka C. Loco). Although most of the group's songs were written in English, the group also released tracks in Malay, Tamil, and Cantonese.

== Beginning ==
The group was founded by Yogeswaran Veerasingam (aka Yogi B) in 1990. It was originally known as Poetic Ammunition, aka PMO, with the original members Yogi B and Anand, aka McEna. PMO released a two-song single with Kenny Music (Kenny Remy Martin), "Run" and "Only You", released under Positive Tone.

Anand later left PMO and Yogi B started a talent search for new members. That is where brothers Landsylde and C Loco together with Point Blanc from Ipoh joined him. They became known as Poetic Ammo.

== Achievements ==
Their first album, entitled It's a Nice Day to Be Alive, was released in 1998, and received positive reviews and several awards. Their second album was entitled The World is Yours (2000). Their third album was entitled Return of tha' Boombox.

The band has won numerous awards including the "Best English Album" award at the Malaysian Anugerah Industri Muzik (AIM) Music Awards 1999. They also won the "Best Music Video" awards at the AIM in 2000 and 2001. The music video "Money Money" was accepted very positively nationally, and even crossed over many countries and achieved mainstream success. Their albums were released in Indonesia by EMI Indonesia. Their albums and singles were also released in Europe by OAG.

== Current ==
=== Yogi B ===
Yogi B released an album titled Vallavan in 2006, a collaboration with Natchatra. It became a huge hit album in the Malaysian hip hop music industry. It also has become well known in South India with one of their remix tracks, "Madhai Thiranthu". They were invited to sing the song as an opening song "Siva Siva" and "Madhai Thiranthu" in the middle of Star Vijay TV Awards show held at India. They are often referred to as Kavidhai Kundargal. After few years Yogi B was approached by music director G. V. Prakash Kumar, to produce and perform in a song alongside S. P. Balasubrahmanyam, for the movie Polladhavan, starring Dhanush. Yogi B and his team, Emcee Jezz and Dr. Burn have sung the first Tamil movie song, with music composed by Kollywood (Tamil), Vidyasagar and also have made first appearance in the movie Kuruvi, starring Vijay, during a song number. Yogi B also has worked with India's world known composer and music director, A. R. Rahman, for the movie Enthiran.

=== Point Blanc ===
Point Blanc started his independent Voyeur Records, and came out with several singles like "Ipoh Mali" and "KL Leng Chai" in 2007. Later that year, he released Straight To The Point, his solo LP, and also released his clothing line Voyeurizm.

=== Landslyde ===
Landslyde formed his own rap metal band, Dragon Red. They won the Best New Local English Artist in the 2007 AIM Awards. Landslyde is the only person who has won the award twice.

=== C Loco ===
C Loco, now known as Sashi C Loco, pursued a solo career and released a single, "Legend of Boo". He was also featured in the soundtrack for the movie Sumo-Lah with the song "V.V.I.P". He recently released his next single in Malay, titled "Bintang", featuring Moe Nasrul. Reportedly his next English song is titled "Hip Hop", and it features a Hindi chorus sung by a new talent named Rekka.

He is also acting as a Magic:the Gathering judge.

== Reunion ==
There has been talk of the group reuniting since early 2007, although no official confirmations or denials of this have been released by any of the members.

In late 2009, Landslyde was interviewed with his band Dragon Red, on the Hitz FM MET 10, during which he explained why the band split. That year, Sashi C Loco was interviewed on the same show, and mentioned that he is keen on the idea of a reunion should matters among the members be resolved. However, the band has been on a permanent hiatus.

== Discography ==
=== Studio albums ===
- It's a Nice Day to Be Alive (1998)
- The World is Yours (2000)
- Return of tha' Boombox (2002)

=== Compilation ===
- The Best of (2004)

=== Yogi B discography ===
Year	Movie	Songs	Co-artists	Composer	Language	Notes
2007	Polladhavan	Engeyum Eppothum	S. P. Balasubrahmanyam, Sunitha Sarathy	Yogi B	Tamil	Also co-lyricist
2008	Kuruvi	Happy New Year	Dr. Burn, Emcee Jesz, Sunidhi Chauhan	Vidyasagar	Tamil	
2008	Ghajini	BGM Rap Verse (Run Run)		A. R. Rahman	Hindi	
2010	Enthiran	Boom Boom Robo Da	Keerthi Sagathia, Shweta Mohan, Tanvi Shah	A. R. Rahman	Tamil	
2011	Aadukalam	Porkkalam (Tamil Rap)	Alwa Vasu	G. V. Prakash Kumar	Tamil	
2011	Aadukalam	Warriors (English Rap)	Alwa Vasu	G. V. Prakash Kumar	Tamil	Also lyricist
2017	Velaiilla Pattadhari 2	Life of Raghuvaran — Nada Da Raja	Dhanush	Sean Roldan	Tamil	
2017	VIP 2 (D)	Life of Raghuvaran — Nada Da Raja	Rahul Nambiar	Sean Roldan	Telugu	
2017	VIP 2 (D)	Life of Raghuvaran — Chal Re Raja	Rahul Nambiar	Sean Roldan	Hindi	
2017	Vivegam	Surviva	Anirudh Ravichander, Mali Manoj	Anirudh Ravichander	Tamil	Also co-lyricist
2017	Vivekam (D)	Surviva	Anirudh Ravichander, Ranjith, Mali	Anirudh Ravichander	Telugu	Also co-lyricist
2018	Kaala	Katravai Patravai	Arunraja Kamaraj, Roshan Jamrock	Santhosh Narayanan	Tamil	
2018	Tik Tik Tik	Tik Tik Tik (Title Track)	Yuvan Shankar Raja, Sunitha Sarathy	D. Imman	Tamil	
2018	Ezhumin	Poraadu Da	Anand Aravindakshan	Ganesh Chandrasekaran	Tamil	
2020	Darbar	Thani Vazhi	Anirudh Ravichander, Shakthisree Gopalan	Anirudh Ravichander	Tamil	Also co-lyricist
2023	Tamilarasan	Thamilarasan (Title Track)	Suzanne D'Mello, Nakash Aziz	Ilaiyaraaja	Tamil	
