= The World Is Yours (Poetic Ammo album) =

The World is Yours

Studio album by Poetic Ammo
- Released: 10 July 2000
- Recorded: 1999 – 2000
- Studios: Playtime Studios; Synchrosound Studios
- Genres: Hip-hop; rap
- Length: 50:54
- Labels: Positive Tone; EMI Music Malaysia
- Producers: Yogi B; Paul "Mad Stacz" Morrison

Poetic Ammo chronology
It's a Nice Day to Be Alive (1998)	The World is Yours (2000)	Return of tha' Boombox (2002)

Singles from The World is Yours
- 1. "Who Be the Player" Released: 1999; 2. "Somebody's Watching" Released: 2000; 3. "Tiada Tandingan" Released: 2000

The World is Yours is a second studio album by Malaysian hip-hop group, Poetic Ammo, released on 10 July 2000 by Positive Tone and EMI Music Malaysia. Five singles were released from the album, with "Who Be the Player" released as its lead single.

== Production ==
The album was recorded primarily at Playtime Studios and Synchrosound Studios in Kuala Lumpur. Unlike their debut album It's a Nice Day to Be Alive (1998), The World is Yours does not contains any interludes and outtakes. While most of the songs in the album were recorded primarily in English, Poetic Ammo recorded only one track in Malay, entitled "Tiada Tandingan", featuring guest vocal by Sheila Majid, who sang chorus and bridge.

The album also features a cover version of American singer Rockwell's 1983 single, "Somebody's Watching Me", which they contributed rap while Singaporean singer, Ferhad sang chorus and bridge. Adibah Noor provided guest vocal on "There is No Stoppin' Us" and also provided backing vocal on "Tiada Tandingan". They were also joined by several musicians including Jamie Wilson on guitars, Pacai on bass and Luke Mason on drums. The album was mixed by Nicholas "Big Nick" Blassband, Paul "Mad Stacz" Morrison and Yogi B and mastered by Bernie Grundman in the United States. The World is Yours is the last album Poetic Ammo recorded and released with its two original members, Landslyde and C. Loco prior to their departure from the group in early 2001.

== Artwork ==
The cover art photography for the album was taken by Malaysian photographer, Simon Chin and designed by Suzanne Kong, while the cartoon illustration was made by Malaysian manga comic artist Lim Vui Seng.

== Release and reception ==
The album was released on 10 July 2000 and become a commercial success. "Who Be the Player" was the first single from the album and previously released as part of the Tricks & Tales compilation album in 1998. "Somebody's Watching", "Tiada Tandingan", "All About the Hook Up" and "Pass the Honey" were released as further singles. Music videos were produced for "Who Be the Player", "Somebody's Watching" and "Pass the Honey".

The album earned the group four nominations at the 8th Anugerah Industri Muzik and won two categories including the Best Album Cover.

== Track listing ==
No.	Title	Length
1.	"Somebody's Watching" (feat. Ferhad)	5:02
2.	"All About the Hook Up" (feat. D' Alliance, Reefa, Ahmad the Mild-Mannered Emcee and Fiquetional of Teh Tarik Crew)	4:35
3.	"There is No Stoppin' Us" (feat. Adibah Noor)	5:02
4.	"We Hit 'Em Up Too"	4:51
5.	"Tiada Tandingan" (feat. Sheila Majid)	4:33
6.	"Pass the Honey" (feat. Atilia)	4:37
7.	"Paid My Dues"	4:36
8.	"Stop Rushin' Me" (feat. Fumi of John's Mistress, Moots! of D'Alliance and Kombatt of The Pilgrims)	4:09
9.	"Intellectual Poetry" (feat. D'Alliance)	3:19
10.	"Who Be the Player"	4:21
Total length:		50:54

Notes

- "Somebody's Watching" contains an interpolation of "Somebody's Watching Me" written and performed by Rockwell.
- "There is No Stoppin' Us" contains an interpolation of "Breakin'... There's No Stopping Us" performed by Ollie and Jerry.
- "We Hit 'Em Up Too" contains an interpolation of "Don't Look Any Further" composed by Paul M. Jackson and Dennis Lambert.
- "Pass the Honey" contains an intrpolation of "Pass the Dutchie" composed by Jackie Mittoo, Fitzroy "Bunny" Simpson and Lloyd "Judge" Ferguson and performed by Musical Youth.

== Release history ==
Region	Date	Format	Label
Malaysia	10 July 2000	CD, Digital download	Positive Tone, EMI Music Malaysia
