= Feminin =

Feminin may refer to:

- Feminin, an archaic name for Estrogen
- Femininity
- Feminin (group)
