= It's a Nice Day to Be Alive =

Studio album by Poetic Ammo
- Released: 23 February 1998
- Recorded: 1996 – 1997
- Studios: Playtime Studios; Carrybase Studios
- Genres: Hip-hop; rap
- Length: 71:54
- Labels: Positive Tone; EMI Music Malaysia
- Producers: Ahmad Izham Omar; Greg Henderson

Poetic Ammo chronology
It's a Nice Day to Be Alive (1998)	The World is Yours (2000)

Singles from It's a Nice Day to Be Alive
- 1. "Everything Changes" Released: 5 January 1998

It's a Nice Day to Be Alive is a debut studio album by Malaysian hip hop group, Poetic Ammo, released on 23 February 1998 by Positive Tone and EMI Music Malaysia. The album was a huge commercial success and propelling Poetic Ammo to fame. It is most widely known for the song "Everything Changes", the group's first and most successful single.

== Production ==
The album was recorded by Poetic Ammo between 1996 and 1997. Prior to the album's release, the group released two singles under Positive Tone – "Run" and "Only You" at the time they performed as Poetic Ammunition in 1994. After MC Ena left the group in 1996, Yogi B recruited Point Blanc and brothers Landslyde and C. Loco and renamed Poetic Ammunition as Poetic Ammo. The group spent most of 1996 to record It's a Nice Day to Be Alive. In a 2003 unpublished interview, Yogi B said of the album: "It was [a] living hell. We slept on the floor; there were times when we had to collect money from each one of us to buy Maggi noodles to eat". Although majority of the songs were recorded in English, the albums also has tracks recorded in Malay (for "Peluru Puitis"), Chinese (for "Kam Sang Tah Kong Chai") and Tamil (for "Vallavan"). The album was mixed by Illegal and mastered by Bernie Grundman in the United States.

== Style ==
Faridul Anwar Farinordin from the New Straits Times elaborated that It's a Nice Day to Be Alive is an "eclectic Asian hip hop album" with a combination of the "sounds of East and West through deft music arrangements and multi-lingual lyrics".

== Release and reception ==
Originally scheduled to be released in September 1997, the album was officially released on 23 February 1998 to popular success. "Everything Changes" was released as the first single on 5 January, a month before the album's release. The album was sold over 15,000 units upon release.

The album earned the group four nominations at the 6th Anugerah Industri Muzik and won the Best Local English Album, while the music video for "Everything Changes" won the MTV Video Music Awards for the Southeast Asia Viewer's Choice Award category.

== Track listing ==
No.	Title	Length
1.	"Look Out Below..."	1:49
2.	"Kuala Lumpur"	3:55
3.	"Interlude"	0:36
4.	"It's a Nice Day to be Alive" (feat. Sam of Innuendo)	5:07
5.	"Something's On"	4:31
6.	"Drama Department Presents..."	1:30
7.	"Evils of Man" (feat. Flipside)	4:37
8.	"Father Be With Us" (feat. Pot and Taj of Innuendo)	4:04
9.	"You Say What 'Bout Hip Hop" (Take No. 1)	0:44
10.	"Peluru Puitis"	5:14
11.	"Run Again..."	0:57
12.	"Approximate Detonation"	5:19
13.	"Vallavan" (feat. Sri Ram)	5:52
14.	"The Awakening..."	1:02
15.	"Real for the World"	5:50
16.	"You Say What 'Bout Hip-Hop" (Take No. 2)	0:53
17.	"Kam Sang Tah Kong Chai" (feat. Jerica & David a.k.a. White Day and The Monk)	4:59
18.	"You Say What 'Bout Hip-Hop" (Take No. 3)	0:47
19.	"Everything Changes" (feat. Lady D of Emberz of Soul)	4:44
20.	"Radio P.T.R.S."	1:44
21.	"Ammunition Check" (feat. Dave Childs)	4:53
22.	"Raw Gratitudes"	2:57
Total length:		71:54

Notes

- "Kuala Lumpur" contains a sample from "Doraemon" by Intoxicated.
- "Something's On" contains an interpolation of "La Di Da Di" by Doug E. Fresh and Slick Rick.
- "Run Again" contains a sample from "24 - Oriental Vocal" by Zero-G and a sample from Tracks 2–25 by Fatboy Slim.
- "Approximate Detonation" contains an interpolation of "Eardrum Medicine (Side B)" by The Serial Wax Killer.
- "Kam Sang Tah Kong Chai" containa a sample from "The Private Eyes" by Samuel Hui and a sample from "Change the Beat" by Beside.

== Certifications ==
Country	Certification	Sales/Shipments
Malaysia	Sold out	15,000

== Release history ==
Region	Date	Format	Label
Malaysia	23 February 1998	CD, Digital download	Positive Tone, EMI Music Malaysia
