= Kembali =

Kembali may refer to:

- Kembali (Rossa album), 2004
- Kembali (Feminin album), 1996
