= John Q. =

2002 American thriller drama film

- Theatrical release poster
- Directed by: Nick Cassavetes
- Written by: James Kearns
- Produced by: Mark Burg; Oren Koules
- Starring: Denzel Washington; Robert Duvall; James Woods; Anne Heche; Eddie Griffin; Kimberly Elise; Shawn Hatosy; Ray Liotta
- Cinematography: Rogier Stoffers
- Edited by: Dede Allen
- Music by: Aaron Zigman
- Production company: Evolution Entertainment
- Distributed by: New Line Cinema
- Release date: February 15, 2002
- Running time: 116 minutes
- Country: United States
- Language: English
- Budget: $36 million
- Box office: $102.2 million

John Q. is a 2002 American thriller crime drama film directed by Nick Cassavetes, and written by James Kearns. It stars Denzel Washington as the title character, a man who takes a hospital emergency room hostage in order for his son to receive a heart transplant. Robert Duvall, James Woods, Anne Heche, Kimberly Elise, and Ray Liotta appear in supporting roles. The film was released by New Line Cinema on February 15, 2002. It received generally negative reviews from critics, but was a commercial success, grossing $102.2 million on a $36 million budget.

== Plot ==
A young woman in a white BMW 5 Series drives recklessly on a mountainous winding road; she collides with a truck and is killed instantly.

Weeks earlier in Chicago, factory worker John Quincy Archibald and his wife Denise are behind on various payments. On Sunday, after church, they rush their young son Michael to the hospital after he collapses at his baseball game. Cardiologist Dr. Raymond Turner and administrator Rebecca Payne tell John and Denise that Michael needs a heart transplant, at a cost of $250,000, or he will die.

However, the couple are behind on their house and car payments and have only $1,000 in savings, and the hospital requires a $75,000 down payment simply to place Michael on the organ transplant list. To make matters worse, John's health insurance will not cover the surgery due to his workplace changing his policy as a result of them switching insurance carriers and reducing his working hours.

The couple attempts to raise the money, even pawn away some priceless items to no avail, but they exhaust all avenues and still come up short. Upon learning the hospital intends to release Michael, in desperation, John takes Dr. Turner and several patients and staff hostage at gunpoint in the ER, demanding that Payne put Michael's name on the transplant list. Police negotiator Lt. Frank Grimes makes contact with John.

Frank clashes with his superior Chief Gus Monroe over the handling of the siege. Most of the hostages sympathize with John and reflect on the flaws of America's healthcare system. A nurse even reveals that Michael's condition could have been detected earlier during routine checkups, but the doctor had not recommended additional testing in order to get bonuses from the insurance company in exchange for helping maintain their profit.

After agreeing to release some of the patients, John is maced and attacked by one hostage, Mitch, but Mitch's girlfriend Julie helps John subdue Mitch as revenge for his abuses while cuffing him. John releases expectant couple Steve and Miriam and immigrant mother Rosa with her infant son, who all declare their support for John to the news crews outside, during which John gives Frank a one-hour deadline until he decides to kill a hostage. Frank and Payne tell Denise about John's act. Payne places Michael on the list to perform the operation pro bono.

Overriding Frank, Monroe has a SWAT sniper enter the ER via an air shaft, luring John into the line of fire with a call from Denise. John speaks with Michael as his condition worsens, while a news crew hacks the police surveillance feed and broadcasts John's conversation with his family. John discovers the hacked news footage just as the sniper fires, only wounding him in the shoulder.

John overpowers the sniper, pummels him, and uses him as a human shield as he reiterates his demands in front of a cheering crowd. As night falls, Michael is removed from the ICU and brought to the ER in exchange for the sniper's release, while Denise waits at the police command post along with the Archibalds' friends Jimmy and Gina Palumbo.

John reveals his intention to die by suicide so that Michael can have his heart. He also reveals that his gun was empty all along. He persuades Dr. Turner to perform the operation, and Julie and security guard Max bear witness to John's impromptu will. He says his goodbyes to Michael, and prepares to end his own life using the only bullet he brought, when Denise brings news that the heart of a recently deceased organ donor – the woman who drove the BMW – is on the way.

Once the heart arrives, John releases the hostages, including patient Lester, who surrenders to police posing as John. John, posing as a surgeon, accompanies Michael to the operating room where Frank, who noticed the switch, allows him to watch Michael's operation before being put into custody.

Three months later, John's actions have sparked national debate about healthcare, and has made headlines on television and talk shows, and in court his family, friends and all the hostages are all at his trial as the jury foreman reads out the verdict. John is acquitted of attempted murder and armed criminal action, but convicted of kidnapping and false imprisonment. His lawyer assures him that he will likely serve no more than two years.

As John is escorted from the courthouse and driven to jail to await sentencing, Lester proclaims him as a hero, and a now-healthy Michael thanks his father for saving his life.

== Cast ==
- Denzel Washington as John Quincy Archibald, a desperate father
- Robert Duvall as Lt. Frank Grimes, a veteran CPD hostage negotiator
- James Woods as Dr. Raymond Turner, the hospital Cardiologist and one of John's hostages
- Anne Heche as Rebecca Payne, the hospital administrator
- Eddie Griffin as Lester Matthews, an injured man at the hospital and one of John's hostages
- Kimberly Elise as Denise Archibald, John's wife
- Shawn Hatosy as Mitch Quigley, one of John's hostages who is an abusive boyfriend
- Ray Liotta as Chief Gus Monroe, Grimes' supervisor
- David Thornton as Jimmy Palumbo
- Ethan Suplee as Max Conlin, the hospital security guard and one of John's hostages
- Kevin Connolly as Steve Maguire, a nurse at the hospital and one of John's hostages
- Paul Johansson as Tuck Lampley
- Heather Wahlquist as Julie Bird, one of John's hostages who is Mitch's girlfriend
- Troy Beyer as Miriam Smith, a pregnant woman and one of John's hostages
- Obba Babatundé as Sgt. Moody, the ranking CPD SWAT leader
- Troy Winbush as Steve Smith, Miriam's husband and one of John's hostages
- Laura Harring as Gina Palumbo
- Larissa Laskin as Dr. Klein
- Dina Waters as Debby Utley
- Martha Chaves as Rosa Gonzalez, an immigrant who brought her infant child to the hospital and one of John's hostages
- Daniel E. Smith as Mike Archibald, John and Denise's ailing son

In addition, in snippets of intermingled actual and fictional television coverage of the event and of the debate over the lack of adequate American health care coverage, are cameos (in order of appearance) by Jay Leno, Gloria Allred, Hillary Clinton, Larry King, Ted Demme, Arianna Huffington, Nas and Bill Maher, as themselves.

== Production ==
The film was shot in Toronto, Hamilton, Ontario, and Canmore, Alberta, although the story takes place in Chicago. Shooting took place from August 8 to November 3, 2000.

According to the commentary on the deleted scenes with Nick Cassavetes and writer James Kearns, the main theme of the movie was said to be "about a miracle and John's faith in God creating the miracle". They also mentioned how SWAT team advisors for the film related a similar true incident at St. Michael's Hospital in Toronto, where a man (Henry Masuka) took an ER hostage after it would not provide immediate service to his infant son on New Year's Eve 1999. When he exited the ER, he was shot and killed and found to be carrying an unloaded pellet gun.

== Reception ==
=== Box office ===
The film was released on February 15, 2002, by New Line Cinema. In the United States and Canada, John Q. grossed $71.8 million, with $30.5 million in other territories, for a worldwide total of $102.2 million, against a budget of $36 million. It opened at No. 1, its first of five consecutive weeks in the Top 10 at the domestic box office.

=== Critical response ===
On the review aggregator website Rotten Tomatoes, 26% of 133 critics' reviews are positive, with an average rating of 4.5/10. The website's consensus reads: "Washington's performance rises above the material, but John Q pounds the audience over the head with its message." Metacritic, which uses a weighted average, assigned the film a score of 30 out of 100, based on 33 critics, indicating "generally unfavorable" reviews. Audiences polled by CinemaScore gave the film an average grade of "A" on an A+ to F scale.

Owen Gleiberman of Entertainment Weekly gave it a "C", stating that "Cassavetes thinks he's making Dog Day Afternoon with a cause, but all he's done is to reduce everything he touches to a shrill, didactic cartoon."

== Legacy ==
The film incited fear in the healthcare industry of copycat incidents by disgruntled patients.

After the killing of Brian Thompson in 2024, this film was mentioned in a number of articles about the incident.

== Remake ==
The film was officially remade in India as the Hindi-language 2006 film Tathastu, in Kannada as Sugreeva and Tamil-language 2023 film Tamilarasan.

== See also ==
- Dog Day Afternoon, an earlier film with a similar hostage premise
- Money Monster, a later film with a similar hostage premise
- Health disparities
