= Tamilarasan =

2023 Indian Tamil action film by Babu Yogeswaran

- Theatrical release poster
- Directed by: Babu Yogeswaran
- Written by: Babu Yogeswaran
- Based on: John Q (English) by James Kearns
- Produced by: S. Kowsalya Rani
- Starring: Suresh Gopi; Vijay Antony
- Cinematography: R. D. Rajasekhar
- Edited by: A. L. Ramesh; Bhuvan Srinivasan
- Music by: Ilaiyaraaja
- Production company: SNS Movies
- Distributed by: Sakthi Film Factory; ZEE5
- Release date: 22 April 2023
- Running time: 129 minutes
- Country: India
- Language: Tamil

Tamilarasan is a 2023 Indian Tamil-language action thriller film written and directed by Babu Yogeswaran and produced by SNS Production Company. The film stars Suresh Gopi, Vijay Antony and Sonu Sood. The music was composed by Ilaiyaraaja. It is an official adaptation of the 2002 American film John Q.

Tamilarasan had its theatrical release on 22 April 2023, and released on the OTT platform ZEE5 on 16 June 2023. The film has received mixed reviews from critics.

== Plot ==
Tamilarasan is a compassionate police officer who hijacks a hospital where his son, Prabhakar has been admitted, after Prabhakar is neglected from getting a heart transplant by the greedy hospital staff, but Tamilarasan faces obstacles from the corrupt superior officer DCP Rana Pratap Singh and his personal enemies.

== Cast ==
- Suresh Gopi as Dr. Muruganandam
- Vijay Antony as Inspector Tamilarasan
- Radha Ravi as Commissioner Sugumaaran IPS
- Remya Nambeesan as Leena
- Sonu Sood as DCP Rana Prathap Singh IPS
- Yogi Babu as Jerry
- Sangeetha as Padma Srinivasan
- Kasthuri Shankar as Jagadeeswari
- Chaya Singh as Doctor
- Y. G. Mahendra as Arthanaari
- Munishkanth as Ganesh Kumar
- Robo Shankar as Nambirajan
- Master Pranav Mohan as Captain Prabhakaran, Tamilarasan's son
- Baby Thulin RA as Minnu
- Gowtham Sundararajan as Police Officer
- Sendrayan as an auto driver
- Aaditya Kathir as Aadhi
- Ashvin Raja as Vetrivel
- Madhumitha as Nurse
- Singampuli as Uppiliappan
- Ganja Karuppu as Kannan
- Rajendran as Muthupandi
- Manobala as Adhimoolam

== Production ==
The principal photography began on 18 January 2019. The film shooting was started on 18 January 2019. The cinematography was by cinematographer R. D. Rajasekhar and editing was handled by A. L. Ramesh and Bhuvan Srinivasan.

== Music ==
Tamilarasan

Soundtrack album by Ilaiyaraaja
- Released: 25 February 2023
- Recorded: 2019–2020
- Venue: Sathyam Cinemas Chennai
- Studio: Divo Studios
- Genre: Feature film soundtrack
- Length: 32:42
- Language: Tamil
- Label: Divo
- Producer: Ilaiyaraja

Ilaiyaraaja chronology
Viduthalai Part 1 (2023)	Tamilarasan (2023)	Custody (2023)

This film's music is composed by Ilaiyaraaja while lyrics are written by Arp. Jayaraam, Palani Bharathi and Madhan Karky The whole album was released but after sometime two singles was added to the album. The title track was released and sung by Yogi B, Suzanne D'Mello and Nakash Aziz all of them marking their debut for Ilaiyaraja and the next single Thamizhan Da and sung by Nakash Aziz and Arjun Chandy with the latter marking his first collaboration with Ilaiyaraaja. This is the last movie where Ilayaraja and S.P. Balasubrahmanyam worked together.

No.	Title	Lyrics	Singer(s)	Length
1.	"Thamizhanoda Veeramellaam"	ARP. Jayaram	Sid Sriram	5:04
2.	"Yaavum Yaavumey"	ARP. Jayaraam	V. V. Prasanna, Vibhavari Apte-Joshi	5:08
3.	"Pakkurappo Pakkurappo"	ARP. Jayaraam	Ilaiyaraja, Neeti Mohan	5:12
4.	"Neethan En Kanavu"	Palani Bharathi	S.P. Balasubrahmanyam	4:19
5.	"Poruththadhu Podhum"	ARP. Jayaraam	K. J. Yesudas	4:31
6.	"Thamilarasan (Title Track)"	Madhan Karky	Yogi B, Suzanne D'Mello, Nakash Aziz	3:28
7.	"Thamizhan Da"	Madhan Karky	Nakash Aziz, Arjun Chandy	5:00
Total length:				32:42

== Release ==
=== Theatrical ===
The film was originally scheduled to release on 6 March 2020, but was postponed due to COVID-19 pandemic crisis. The next time, The film fixed its release date as 31 December 2021, but was again postponed. The film was postponed for many years and was released on 22 April 2023.

=== Home media ===
Zee Tamil obtained the satellite rights of the film, while ZEE5 secured the digital rights. The film released on the ZEE5 platform on 16 June 2023.

== Reception ==
Tamilarasan received mixed reviews from critics.

=== Critical reception ===
M. Suganth of The Times of India gave the film a rating of 2 out of 5 and wrote, "The treatment is as old-fashioned as the songs that Ilaiyaraaja dishes out, it results in a movie-watching experience that is as boring as watching an IV drip." Avinash Ramachandran of Cinema Express gave the film a rating of 2 out of 5, stating, "As the world of Tamilarasan unravels, the narrative decisions pose many questions, but we end up with hardly any satisfying answers" A critic from Dinamalar gave the film a rating of 2/5, stating, "The film was supposed to be released in the 1980s, so the ladies may have cried and watched it. It's too late to release in 2023, which is too boring." A critic from Maalai Malar gave the film a rating of 2/5, stating, "The corrupt politicians and greedy hospital employees remind us of the films Ramanaa and Nenjirukkum Varai. The songs make us question, Is this composed by Ilaiyaraaja?"
