= Feminin (group) =

Malaysian girl group

- Origin: Kuala Lumpur, Malaysia
- Genres: Pop; R&B; hip hop
- Years active: 1992–1998; 2005; 2025
- Labels: New Southern; Warner Music Malaysia
- Past members: Asfarina Muhamad (As); Ruzilawati Muhamad (Watie); Andriaty Abdul Rahman (Yatie); Nor Intan Zanariah Abdul Zaharin (Deq Nor); Nor Askiela Zainal Abidin (Along)

Feminin (lit. 'Feminine') was a Malaysian girl group from Kuala Lumpur, consisting of sisters Asfarina (As) and Ruzilawati Muhamad (Watie), Andriaty Abdul Rahman (Yatie), Nor Intan Zanariah Abdul Zaharin (Deq Nor) and Nor Askiela Zainal Abidin (Along). The group achieved brief success between 1992 and 1997 and best known for their notable songs like "Untukmu", "Kini" and "Kehadiran". Their debut album, Untukmu, sold 100,000 copies on the day of its release, a record for an album by a Malaysian female group.

Feminin was one of the most successful female Malaysian music group of the 1990s. Aside from their music, they were known for their physical appearance and wide coverage in the entertainment media. Throughout their career, the group won numerous awards, including the inaugural Anugerah Industri Muzik for the Best New Duo/Group Artiste. The group disbanded in 1998 and have since, went indefinite hiatus to focus on their careers and personal lives individually, though they have been reunited twice.

== History ==
The members of Feminin started out as a dance group with the Edrina Collection, managed by Edriss Razhe, when they auditioned in the 1991 Malaysia Fiesta. They then brought together by Edriss, who found that the group members were talented and offer them a chance to become a recording artist. The group later signed to the New Southern Records (NSR).

After a year of preparation, Feminin launched their debut album, Untukmu on 26 July 1993 under NSR. The album included 10 tracks, with four of them were written by KRU. The titular song was released as a lead single. The album was well-received and sold 100,000 copies upon its release, a record for a work by a female Malaysian music group.

After the success of Untukmu, the group began to work on a second album, scheduled for a 1994 release. However, its founding member Along left Feminin, citing personal reason and creative differences, leaving the group to continue as a quartet. In May, the group released their first remix album, Feminin in the House Mega Mix, their last release as a quintet. The album contained remixed versions of tracks from Untukmu.

Their second album, Kini, their first release as a quartet, was released in July under Warner Music Malaysia, after previously having been signed to NSR. The album contained 10 tracks and two bonus tracks, with seven of them written by KRU. Two singles from the album, "Kini" and "Rindu", were hits, as was the album; it sold 50,000 copies on the day of its release. In 1995, they formed their own company, Feminin Productions and later, become a Malaysian ambassador for Lux brand, following Fauziah Latiff and Sheila Majid.

Feminin released their third and last album, Kembali, in February 1996. The album has 11 tracks including a cover version of "Hanya Sekali", originally performed by Singaporean girl group, Ideal Sisters. In the album, they recorded only one track in English, entitled "Ride & Slide". The album was well-received, sold 30,000 copies and certified Gold. In August 1997, Deq Nor left Feminin due to family and work commitments as well as her marriage, leaving the group to continued as a trio.

Feminin was among of few Malaysian artists, including Siti Nurhaliza, to perform at the 1998 Commonwealth Games function on 11 July 1998. The group disbanded in late 1998 and have since went indefinite hiatus to focus on their own careers and personal lives. In 2005, they reunited for a short period to release their first compilation album, Untukmu... Kini, included 16 songs from their first three studio albums including a new song, "Untukmu... Kini", which is a new version of their hit "Untukmu".

During the 2010s, Feminin released two more compilation albums, Kenangan Abadi (2011) and 20th Feminin (2013). The group reunited for a second time in May 2025 as one of the guest performers of KRU's GenKRU concert series.

== Style ==
Earlier in their career, Feminin incorporated rap and hip-hop styles in their debut album, Untukmu. Following the release of Kini, the group distanced themselves from singing rap songs and shifting to a more commercial pop, ballad and R&B nuances. While they exclusively sings in their native Malay, Feminin has recorded and released "Ride & Slide", their only song in English, from Kembali.

== Discography ==
=== Studio albums ===
| Title | Album details | Certifications | Sales |
|---|---|---|---|
| Untukmu | Released: 26 July 1993; Label: New Southern Records (NSR); Formats: CD, cassette | 2x Platinum | 100,000 |
| Kini | Released: July 1994; Label: Warner Music Malaysia; Formats: CD, cassette | Platinum | 50,000 |
| Kembali | Released: February 1996; Label: Warner Music Malaysia; Formats: CD, cassette | Gold | 30,000 |

=== Compilation albums ===
| Title | Album details |
|---|---|
| Untukmu... Kini | Released: 30 May 2005; Label: Warner Music Malaysia; Formats: CD, cassette |
| Kenangan Abadi | Released: 2011; Label: Warner Music Malaysia; Formats: CD, cassette |
| 14 Lagu Hit Paling Hebat: 20th Feminin | Released: 2013; Label: New Southern Records (NSR); Formats: CD, cassette |

=== Remix album ===
| Title | Album details |
|---|---|
| Feminin in the House Mega Mix | Released: May 1994; Label: New Southern Records (NSR); Formats: CD, cassette |

== Awards and nominations ==
Awards and nominations received by KRU
| Award(s) | Year | Recipient(s) and nominee(s) | Category | Result | Ref(s) |
|---|---|---|---|---|---|
| Anugerah Bintang Popular Berita Harian | 1993 | Feminin | Best Group Artiste | Nominated | |
| Anugerah Industri Muzik | 1993 | Feminin | Best Group/Duo Artiste | Won | |
| Anugerah Media Hiburan | 1994 | Feminin | Popular Group Artiste | Nominated | |
