= Cell Murugan =

Indian actor

- Born: Murugan
- Occupations: Actor, comedian
- Years active: 2001-present

Cell Murugan is an Indian actor and comedian who predominantly works in Tamil cinema. He is known for appearing alongside Vivek in several films.

== Career ==
Cell Murugan worked as a manager to Vivek and co-starred with him in almost all of his films. He played a notable role in 1977 (2009) as a Malaysian Tamil who warns Vivek not to go after a Malaysian-Chinese girl after a sign outside her house says "Awas Anjing" (transl. beware of dogs). His role in the film Anthony Yaar? (2009) was praised as a man whose mustache gets shaved off by Vivek in a bar. He played full length comedy roles in Sivappu Mazhai (2010), Pathayeram Kodi (2013), Killadi (2015) and Ezhumin (2018).

In 2022 and 2024, on Vivek's one-year and three-year death anniversary, respectively, Cell Murugan planted a sapling continuing his Green Kalam initiative in remembrance of him.

== Filmography ==
Year	Film	Role	Notes
2001	Citizen	Advocate	Uncredited role
2001	12B	Car owner	Uncredited role
2002	Youth	Thief	
2002	Kadhal Virus	Police Inspector	
2003	Kadhal Sadugudu	Patient	
2003	Saamy	Traffic Inspector	
2003	Thithikudhe	Film director	
2003	Thirumalai	Telugu devotee of Tirumala Vishnu	
2003	Enakku 20 Unakku 18	Traffic Inspector	
2004	Perazhagan	Murugan	
2005	Thaka Thimi Tha	Murugan	
2005	Anbe Vaa	Man with love letters	
2005	Vanakkam Thalaiva	Police Inspector	
2006	Paramasivan	Sandeep Munusamy	
2006	Saravana	Inspector T. Manavaalan	
2006	Kalvanin Kadhali	Cart puller	
2006	Madhu	Police Inspector	
2007	Aalwar	Ponds' friend	
2008	Singakutty	Police Inspector	
2008	Kuruvi	Malaysian Tamil	
2008	Aayudham Seivom	Arumugam	
2008	Durai	Traffic cop	
2009	Padikkadavan	Cell Murugan	
2009	Perumal	Idithangi's follower	
2009	1977	Murugan	
2009	Guru En Aalu	Rowdy	
2009	Anthony Yaar?	Meena's brother	
2010	Sivappu Mazhai	Chandy	
2010	Magane En Marumagane	Weightu Veerasamy	
2010	Singam	Mumbai Rowdy	
2010	Vaada	Annamalai's kidnapper	
2010	Bale Pandiya	Thirupathi	
2011	Seedan	Gumbidiswamy's assistant	
2011	Mappillai	Chinna's friend	
2011	Bhavani	Motorcycle driver	
2011	Oru Nunakkadha	420	Malayalam film
2011	Vedi	Balloon seller	
2012	Murattu Kaalai	Veterinarian	
2013	Pathayeram Kodi	Shankar Lal's assistant	
2013	Kantha	Needhi Nayagam	
2013	Chandra	Lekkachara	Kannada film
2014	Chandra	Kizhakku	
2014	Naan Than Bala	Thomas Alva Edison	
2014	Velaiilla Pattadhari	Manickam	
2015	Killadi	Rambo	
2015	Yennai Arindhaal	Police Officer	
2015	Buddhanin Sirippu	Jobless man	
2015	Palakkattu Madhavan	Chittukuruvi	
2015	Sakalakala Vallavan	Pasupathy's assistant	
2016	Manithan	Advocate	
2017	Muthuramalingam	Arul Murugan	
2017	Brindavanam	Mani	
2017	Velaiilla Pattadhari 2	Manickam	
2018	Ezhumin	Thoodhu	
2020	Dharala Prabhu	Vanangamudi	
2021	Aranmanai 3	Manickam	
2022	Beast	Home Minister's assistant	
2022	The Legend	Man from Manali	
2024	Raayan	Bartender	
2024	Vasco Da Gama	Mr. Perfect	
2025	Madharaasi	Theatregoer	Uncredited appearance in the song "Thangapoovey"
2025	Shakthi Thirumagan	Maaran	
2026	Anbe Diana	Mangababu	
2026	Vishwanath & Sons	Tea stall vendor	
