= Kini (Feminin album) =

Studio album by Feminin
- Released: 10 October 1994
- Recorded: December 1993 – June 1994
- Studios: KRU Studio; Channel 11 Studio; Booty Boys Studio
- Genres: Pop, R&B
- Length: 44:45
- Label: Warner Music Malaysia
- Producers: KRU; Feminin; Kevin Wayne

Feminin chronology
Untukmu (1993)	Kini (1994)	Kembali (1996)

Singles from Kini
- 1. "Kini" Released: 1994; 2. "Rindu" Released: 1994; 3. "Sendiri" Released: 1995

Kini (Now) is the second studio album by Malaysian girl group, Feminin, released on 10 October 1994 by Warner Music Malaysia. Three singles were released from the album.

== Production ==
Kini is the first studio album Feminin recorded and released with Warner Music Malaysia, after previously having been signed to New Southern Records (NSR), and their first album as a quartet following the departure of one of its founding member, Along. It was produced after the massive success of their debut album, Untukmu (For You; 1993).

The album was recorded in three different recording studios in Kuala Lumpur, namely KRU Studio, Channel 11 Studio and Booty Boys Studio. For the first time in their music career, Feminin serves as the co-producer for their second album. Majority of the songs in the album were composed and written by Malaysian boy band, KRU, while many of few songs were composed and written by Johan Nawawi (for "Dunia Cinta"), Razman ("Wira" and "Rindu") and Badiq ("Cinta Pertama").

Musicians who involved in the album were Shah Slam who plays guitar for the songs "Suatu Hari Nanti", "Wira" and "Kembali", Jimmy and Razak Rahman who plays saxophone for the songs "Cintaku" and "Rindu" respectively. The album has 12 tracks including two bonus tracks – "Tanpa Curiga" and "Cinta Pertama". The album was produced by KRU and Kevin Wayne.

== Release and reception ==
Originally scheduled to be released in July 1994, the album was released on 10 October the same year to popular success. Six music videos were produced for the album, for the songs including "Rindu", "Di Mana" and the title track. The album was well-received, sold 50,000 copies and being certified Platinum.

Writing for Harian Metro, Haswita Ashaari described Kini as "something that is new and mature".

Despite Kini's warm sales, Feminin decided to look for a new sound and broke off their partnership with KRU in 1995.

== Track listing ==
No.	Title	Writer(s)	Length
1.	"Kini"	Yusry Abd Halim, Edry Abd Halim	4:57
2.	"Suatu Hari Nanti"	Norman, Yusry	4:31
3.	"Cintaku"	KRU	3:52
4.	"Dunia Cinta"	Johan Nawawi	3:43
5.	"Wira"	Razman, KRU	4:28
6.	"Kembali"	KRU	3:54
7.	"Di Mana"	KRU	4:50
8.	"Sendiri"	KRU	3:54
9.	"Tetap Bersama"	KRU	3:46
10.	"Rindu"	Razman	4:27
11.	"Tanpa Curiga" (bonus track)	Kevin, Azman Abu Hassan	3:57
12.	"Cinta Pertama" (bonus track)	Badiq	3:14
Total length:			44:45

== Certifications ==
Country	Certification	Sales/Shipments
Malaysia	Platinum	50,000

== Release history ==
Region	Date	Format	Label
Malaysia	10 October 1994	CD, Digital download	Warner Music Malaysia
