= Kuruvi =

2008 film directed by Dharani

- Theatrical poster
- Directed by: Dharani
- Screenplay by: Dharani
- Dialogues by: B. Babusivan
- Story by: Dharani
- Produced by: Udhayanidhi Stalin
- Starring: Vijay; Trisha; Suman
- Cinematography: S. Gopinath
- Edited by: V. T. Vijayan
- Music by: Vidyasagar
- Production company: Red Giant Movies
- Distributed by: Red Giant Movies
- Release date: 3 May 2008
- Running time: 170 minutes
- Country: India
- Language: Tamil
- Budget: ₹18 crore

Kuruvi (transl. Sparrow) (Note: In Tamil, "Kuruvi" correctly means "sparrow", but it is also trade jargon for low-level contraband carriers.) is a 2008 Indian Tamil-language action comedy film written and directed by Dharani. It is produced by Udhayanidhi Stalin under Red Giant Movies. The film stars Vijay in the main lead role alongside Trisha, Suman, Vivek, Ashish Vidyarthi and Manivannan. It also marked Nivetha Thomas's Tamil debut as a child artist.

Kuruvi was released on 3 May 2008 and completed a 150-day theatrical run. It was one of the highest grossing Tamil films of 2008 in the United Kingdom alone, collecting £263,919 or ₹3 crore. The film collected $1,018,120 or ₹9 crore at the overseas box office. In 2021, The film was re-released in Kerala.

== Plot ==
Vetrivel "Velu", a racer lives with his large family in Chennai. Velu's father, Singamuthu, had gone to Kadapa in Andhra Pradesh to work at a colliery and he never returned to Chennai, prompting Velu and his family to think that Singamuthu is dead. Velu learns that a Malaysia-based crime boss named Gocha owes his father a huge sum of money. Velu and his friend Aaps travel to Malaysia as Kuruvi (Courier), the trade jargon for low-level contraband carriers. Velu and Aaps come to Malaysia at a time when internal rivalry and problems are surfacing in Gocha's family.

Gocha's younger sister, Radhadevi alias Devi, has refused to marry Soori, the brother of Konda Reddy, Gocha's Kadapa-based business associate. Irritated and preoccupied, Gocha doesn't devote any time or attention to resolve Velu's problem. Velu is ill-treated and thrown out of Gocha's place without any help. Determined to return to India only after his father's issue is solved to his satisfaction, Velu conceals himself in Gocha's residence and steals a large diamond owned by Gocha, feeling that it would pay off his father's debt, and returns to India with Aaps. Devi also follows Velu to India, having fallen in love with him, when Velu saves her from falling from a tall building during New Year's Eve.

Knowing that Velu has stolen his diamond, Gocha and his gang visit Velu's house and threaten his family with dire consequences unless Velu returns the diamond. After confronting Gocha, Velu learns that his father is alive and is being held as bonded labour along with many innocent people at Kadapa. Singamuthu had discovered diamonds at the colliery but refused to allow Gocha and Konda Reddy to illegally mine the diamonds for their own benefit. He had been held prisoner in Kadapa ever since. Velu immediately leaves for Kadapa, where he encounters Gocha again. He throws him onto a moving train thereby paralyzing him.

Velu soon discovers a slave camp run by Gocha and Konda Reddy at the colliery, where a womanising goon named Kadappa Raja is torturing the inmates. With the help of his uncle Elango (Ilavarasu), Venu sneaks into Gocha's mansion on the eve of Devi's wedding with Soori to find out his father's whereabouts. With the help of Devi who reveals that Gocha's own fingerprint is his laptop's password, he unlocks Gocha's laptop. On unlocking & seeing Gocha's laptop, Velu and Devi learn that Gocha and his associates have been cheating the government by illegally mining diamonds against the law and also have secret government documents in their possession.

Velu also paralyzes Soori by getting him stung by bees on the wedding day thereby stopping the wedding. He single-handedly takes on Konda Reddy, Kadapa Raja and their henchmen, killing them all. He drags Konda Reddy's dead body to Gocha's mansion. Gocha, who now uses a wheelchair, recovers on seeing the dead body of his associate and attempts to shoot Velu. He is arrested at that moment by a STF officer Raj, who reveals that Velu had forwarded all the information to them from Gocha's laptop. Singamuthu and the others are reunited with their families, and Velu reunites with Devi.

== Cast ==
- Vijay as Vetrivel alias Velu
- Trisha as Radhadevi alias Devi (voice dubbed by Savitha Radhakrishnan)
- Suman as Gocha, Devi's brother and Kadappa Diamond quarry's illegal business owner
- Vivek as Aaps, Velu's friend
- Ashish Vidyarthi as Konda Reddy Gocha's Diamond quarry illegal business partner
- Manivannan as Singamuthu, Velu's father and Gocha's Diamond quarry worker
- T. K. Kala as Parvathi, Velu's mother
- Saranya Ponvannan as Gocha's wife, Devi's sister-in-law
- Nivetha Thomas as Velu's sister
- Ilavarasu as Elango, Velu's uncle and Diamond quarry worker
- Sujatha Sivakumar as Singamuthu's 2nd Wife, Velu's Aunt
- S. N. Lakshmi as Singamuthu's Mother, Velu's Grandmother
- Chitti Babu as Gocha's P.A.
- Aarthi as Constable
- Pawan as Soori, Konda Reddy's brother
- G. V. Sudhakar Naidu as Kadappa Raja, Gocha's diamond quarry workers' head
- Narsing Yadav as Moneylender
- G. M. Kumar as Abdul Razak (Bhai)
- Lollu Sabha Jeeva as Bujjibabu
- Swaminathan as Rasappa
- Kalpana Shree as Vetrivel's sister
- Birla Bose as Hotel Manager
- Cell Murugan as Malaysian Tamil
- Sravan as Sravan, Rival Racer
- Kottachi as Kottangachi
- Chaplin Balu as Slave
- Maran
- Irfan Zaini as Devi's brother (uncredited)
- Vimal as Slave (uncredited)
- Vidharth as Slave (uncredited)
- Nassar in a cameo appearance as Raj, DGP of Encounter squad targeting business mafia
- Poetic Ammo (Yogi B, Dr. Burn and Emcee Jesz) in a cameo appearance in the song "Happy New Year"
- Malavika in a cameo appearance in the song "Dandaana Darna"
- Japan Kumar in a cameo appearance in the song "Dandaana Darna"

== Production ==
It was announced in June 2007 that Udhayanidhi Stalin, son of M. K. Stalin and grandson of the then-Tamil Nadu Ex-Chief minister M. Karunanidhi, would produce films under his production banner Red Giant Movies. Nayanthara was first approached to be heroine of the film, but Trisha was later selected. Suman replaced Prakash Raj as the antagonist. The film was predominantly shot in Chennai and Malaysia, while a song was shot in New Zealand.

== Soundtrack ==
The soundtrack is composed by Vidyasagar. The audio rights were acquired by Anak Audio and Ayngaran Music.The film's audio launch was held at the Little Flower Convent on 16 April 2008 in Chennai. Rediff.com wrote: "Vidyasagar's music has only sheen, no soul". Karthik of Milliblog wrote, "Kuruvi is no Gilli, but does have its own quirky charm".

The song "Mozha Mozhannu" generated controversy because the name of freedom fighter Thillaiaadi Valliammai was mentioned in the song.

Song	Singers	Lyricist	Length
"Happy New Year"	Yogi B, Dr. Burn, Emcee Jesz, Sunidhi Chauhan	Na. Muthukumar	04:05
"Dandaana Darna"	Sangeeth Haldhipur	Kabilan	03:40
"Thaen Thaen Thaen"	Udit Narayan, Shreya Ghoshal	Yugabharathi	03:38
"Palaanadhu Palaanadhu"	Vidyasagar, S. Rajalakshmi	Pa. Vijay	04:05
"Kuruvi Kuruvi"	Benny Dayal, Praveen Mani, Dr. Burn, Vetri Boys, SuVi	Na. Muthukumar	02:00
"Mozha Mozhannu"	Kay Kay, Anuradha Sriram	Pa. Vijay	03:55

== Critical reception ==
Kuruvi received mixed reviews from critics.

Rediff wrote "Kuruvi's got everything to appeal to Vijay fans – but Dharani the director is lost in this melee of fist-fights and elementary comedy". Sify wrote, "To give Dharani his due, Kuruvi is watchable in parts, for die-hard fans of Vijay. For ordinary viewers, the film lacks a basic story and stretches ones patience for nearly three hours". Ananda Vikatan rated the film 39 out of 100. The Hindu wrote that the film "tries its best to fly high, only that the effort isn’t enough because earlier his eagle (Ghilli) had soared much higher. Of course, Dharani keeps up the momentum and things move fast to the midway point".

== See also ==
- List of films featuring slavery
