= Yogi B =

- Born: Yogeswaran Veerasingam; December 14, 1974 (age 51); Kuala Lumpur, Malaysia
- Genres: Hip hop, rap
- Occupations: Singer, songwriter, record producer
- Years active: 1990–present
- Formerly of: Poetic Ammo

Balakrishna Ganeshan Yogeswaran Veerasingam (born December 14, 1974), popularly known by his stage name Yogi B or Yogi B., is a Malaysian Tamil rapper and music producer. He is noted for his pioneering contributions to the Tamil hip-hop genre.

== Early life ==
Yogeswaran Veerasingam was born on December 14,1974, in Kuala Lumpur, Malaysia, and grew up in a multicultural environment that would later influence his musical career. Raised in an Indian Tamil-speaking family, Yogeswaran's early exposure to diverse languages and cultural traditions played a crucial role in shaping his unique musical style. His grandfather, Kumaraswamy, was a notable Dravidian leader in Malaysia, known for his advocacy and impact within the Dravidian movement.

== Career ==
=== Poetic Ammo ===
Yogi B founded the Malaysian hip-hop group Poetic Ammo in the mid-1990s. Besides Yogi B, it consisted of Chandrakumar Balakrishnan (aka Land Slyde), Nicholas Ong (aka Point Blanc), and Sashi Kumar Balakrishnan (aka C. Loco). Although most of the group's songs were written in English, they also released tracks in Malay, Tamil, and Cantonese.

The band won the 'Best English Album' award at the Malaysian Anugerah Industri Muzik (AIM) Music Awards in 1999. They also received the 'Best Music Video' award at AIM in 2000 and 2001. Their music video 'Money Money' gained widespread national and international acclaim.

=== Rise to fame ===
The mid-2000s were transformative for Yogi B, marked by a surge in the popularity of Tamil hip-hop. His collaboration with the rap duo Natchatra (consisting of Dr. Burn and Emcee Jesz) played a pivotal role in this rise. In 2006, Yogi B achieved notable success with the release of the album Vallavan. Yogi B also served as the executive producer of the album.

The album's standout track, "Madai Thiranthu", became a sensation, resonating with both the Tamil diaspora and the Tamil community in India. The song, a unique fusion of the classic Ilaiyaraaja number with contemporary rap, captivated audiences worldwide. It garnered significant recognition from the Tamil diaspora in London, Australia, Sri Lanka, and Scandinavian countries. In South India, the song became closely associated with the now-defunct SS Music channel, which played it frequently. The album sold more than 25,000 units.

=== Playback singing ===
In 2007, Yogi B made his debut in the Tamil film industry with Polladhavan. He performed the song "Engaeyum Eppothum", a track that featured legendary playback singer S. P. Balasubrahmanyam and which was a remix of the similarly-named song from Ninaithale Inikkum. Yogi B's collaboration on this track marked a significant milestone in his career, bridging his independent music success with mainstream cinema.

Following his success with Polladhavan, Yogi B continued to collaborate with several renowned music composers, further establishing his presence in the Tamil film industry. He has worked with Vidyasagar (Kuruvi), A. R. Rahman (Enthiran), Sean Roldan (Velaiyilla Pattathari 2), Santhosh Narayanan (Kaala), D. Imman (Tik Tik Tik), and Anirudh Ravichander (Darbar).

== Discography ==
=== With Poetic Ammo ===
Year	Album	Artists	Ref.
1998	It's a Nice Day to Be Alive	Poetic Ammo	
2000	The World is Yours	Poetic Ammo	
2003	Return of tha' Boombox	Poetic Ammo	

=== With Natchatra ===
Year	Album	Artists	Ref.
2006	Vallavan	Yogi B and Natchatra	

=== As singer ===
Year	Movie	Song	Co-artists	Composer	Language	Notes
2007	Polladhavan	"Engeyum Eppothum"	S. P. Balasubrahmanyam, Sunitha Sarathy	Yogi B	Tamil	Also co-lyricist
2008	Kuruvi	"Happy New Year"	Dr. Burn, Emcee Jesz, Sunidhi Chauhan	Vidyasagar	Tamil	
2008	Ghajini	"BGM Rap Verse (Run Run)"		A. R. Rahman	Hindi	
2010	Enthiran	"Boom Boom Robot Da"	Keerthi Sagathia, Shweta Mohan, Tanvi Shah	A. R. Rahman	Tamil	
2010	Robo (D)	"Boom Boom Robo Da"	Keerthi Sagathia, Shweta Mohan, Tanvi Shah	A. R. Rahman	Telugu	
2011	Aadukalam	"Porkkalam (Tamil Rap)"	Alwa Vasu	G. V. Prakash Kumar	Tamil	
2011	Aadukalam	"Warriors (English Rap)"	Alwa Vasu	G. V. Prakash Kumar	Tamil	Also lyricist
2017	Velaiilla Pattadhari 2	"Life of Raghuvaran — Nada Da Raja"	Dhanush	Sean Roldan	Tamil	Also co-lyricist
2017	VIP 2 (D)	"Life of Raghuvaran — Nada Da Raja"	Rahul Nambiar	Sean Roldan	Telugu	Also co-lyricist
2017	VIP 2 (D)	"Life of Raghuvaran — Chal Re Raja"	Rahul Nambiar	Sean Roldan	Hindi	Also co-lyricist
2017	Vivegam	"Surviva"	Anirudh Ravichander, Mali Manoj	Anirudh Ravichander	Tamil	Also co-lyricist
2017	Vivekam (D)	"Surviva"	Anirudh Ravichander, Ranjith, Mali	Anirudh Ravichander	Telugu	Also co-lyricist
2018	Kaala	"Katravai Patravai"	Arunraja Kamaraj, Roshan Jamrock	Santhosh Narayanan	Tamil	
2018	Tik Tik Tik	"Tik Tik Tik (Title Track)"	Yuvan Shankar Raja, Sunitha Sarathy	D. Imman	Tamil	
2018	Ezhumin	"Poraadu Da"	Anand Aravindakshan	Ganesh Chandrasekaran	Tamil	
2020	Darbar	"Thani Vazhi"	Anirudh Ravichander, Shakthisree Gopalan	Anirudh Ravichander	Tamil	Also co-lyricist
2020	Athigaari	"Rudra V Parama"	Yunohoo, Pavithra Nair	Shameshan Mani Maran	Tamil	Also lyricist
2021	Salaga	"Salaga Title Track"	Sharath, Charan Raj, Sanjith Hegde	Charan Raj	Kannada	
2023	Tamilarasan	"Thamilarasan (Title Track)"	Suzanne D'Mello, Nakash Aziz	Ilaiyaraaja	Tamil	
2024	Viduthalai Part 2	"Poruthadhu Podham"		Ilaiyaraaja	Tamil	
2025	Kaantha	"Rage Of Kaantha"	Siddharth Basrur, AbhinavaKavi	Jhanu Chanthar	Tamil	Also co-lyricist
2025	Kaantha - (D)	"Rage Of Kaantha"	Siddharth Basrur, AbhinavaKavi	Jhanu Chanthar	Telugu	Also co-lyricist

=== As music director ===
Year	Movie	Language
2011	Oru Vaarthai Pesu	Tamil

== Personal life ==
Yogi B attributes much of his success as a Tamil hip-hop artist to the invaluable support of his mother, who died in 2013. Her demise affected him both personally and professionally. This loss, combined with two major surgeries for goitre, created a period of intense difficulty for him. Yogi B's mother played a crucial role in his musical career by assisting with the translation of Tamil rap portions, ensuring that the poetry and lyrical integrity were preserved.

Yogi B has expressed admiration for The Casteless Collective, an anti-caste music group founded by filmmaker Pa. Ranjith's Neelam Cultural Centre. Yogi B said that the collective’s alignment with social justice themes and its stance against caste discrimination resonate with his own values and artistic vision.

== Legacy ==
Yogi B's contributions to Tamil hip-hop have had a lasting impact on the genre. His ability to merge Tamil cultural elements with contemporary hip-hop has influenced a new generation of artists and shaped the evolution of South Asian music. His innovative work earned him the nickname 'Godfather of Tamil Hip-Hop'.
