= Ezhumin =

- Directed by: V.P. Viji
- Written by: V.P. Viji
- Produced by: V.P. Viji
- Starring: Vivek; Devayani; Azhagam Perumal; Prem; Raghavan Umasrinivasan
- Cinematography: Gopi Jagadeeshwaran
- Edited by: Karthik Ram
- Music by: Ganesh Chandrasekaran
- Production company: Vaiyam Mediyas
- Release date: 18 October 2018
- Running time: 109 minutes
- Country: India
- Language: Tamil

Ezhumin is a 2018 Indian martial arts film that primarily focuses on the importance of martial arts and self-defense. This film is written and directed by V.P. Viji, who also produced this film under his own production company, Vaiyam Mediyas. The film was released on 18 October 2018, with Telugu and Malayalam version released on the same date at a later time.

This film stars Vivek and Devayani in the lead roles. The film's music was composed by debutant Ganesh Chandrasekaran, with the film's background score composed by Srikanth Deva.

== Cast ==
- Vivek as Vishwanathan
- Devayani as Bharathi
- Azhagam Perumal as Sundaram
- Prem as G. Rajasekar
- Raghavan Umasrinivasan as the coach
- Cell Murugan as Thoodhu
- Pasanga Sivakumar as Ajay's father
- Subageetha as Ajay's mother
- Latha Rao as Aadhira's mother
- Porali Dileepan as Kavin's father
- Ranjana Suresh as Kavin's mother
- Vijay Anand as Sara's father
- Akila as Sara's mother
- Kiruthiga as Aadira
- V.P. Viji as Vinith's father
- Chitra as Vinith's mother

== Production ==
The shoot of the film begun on 8 January 2018 in Chennai, with the cast and crew assembling for a launch ceremony. The entire film was shot within Chennai in various locations, and the climax portion has shot in Omega Factory. Children were involved by performing various risky stunts without dupes and even more by walking all in the roof nearly 60 feet high from the ground level with no safety beds. We can witness many real stunts in the movie as they are real champions in martial arts to give the perfect punch and postures.

Production house involved in connecting all martial arts students across Tamil Nadu to step forward and extend their support for the awareness of self-defense which will be a part of movie promotion. Movie Trailer launch has launched on 24 June 2018 at RKV Studios, Vadapalani with guests including Silambarasan, Karthi, and Vishal. Trailer has been claimed very positive words from everyone with positive messages as like the tagline "Arise, Awake, and Achieve". The audio launch was conducted on 23 August 2018 at Kalaivanar Arangam with guests including D. Imman and Hiphop Tamizha Aadhi.

Director conducted audition in AVM for all martial arts students from Tamil Nadu and Selected 5 children Champions in Kung Fu, Karate, Silambam, Gymnastic and Kick Boxing among 1500 students. Selected candidates have won various prizes in District, State, and National Level tournaments. Director has got a strong point to create awareness about Self Defence as nowadays there are much sexual harassment, abuses, etc, for kids and women.

The director succeeded in convincing Vivek to play the character of Vishwanathan, while he cast the Devayani as the female lead opposite as his wife for the first time. Their character has been portrayed as a wealthy family who lives for their son Arjun. In addition, Azhagam Perumal has been roped for a negative shade character, whereas Rishi Attu fame will be doing a villain role. Porali Dileepan, Pasanga Sivakumar, Vijay Anand, Subageetha, Latha Rao, V.P. Viji, Chitra as parents for all other children.

== Soundtrack ==
The film's soundtrack, released on 23 August 2018, was composed by Ganesh Chandrasekaran. Music rights have been bagged by Sony Music India. The album received a huge response from the audience for the fresh sounding and powerful tracks. The song Ezhada was very emotional sung by actor Dhanush and the song Ezhu Ezhu power packed by Anirudh Ravichander.

No.	Title	Lyrics	Singer(s)	Length
1.	"Ezhada"	Thamizhanangu	Dhanush	3:37
2.	"Poradu Da"	Pa. Vijay	Yogi B & Anand Aravindakshan	3:18
3.	"Ezhu Ezhu"	Vivek	Anirudh Ravichander	2:04
4.	"Minmini Koottamey"	Mohan Raja	Jagadeesh & Yamini Ghantasala	3:38

== Critical reception ==
Deccan Chronicle wrote, "Kudos to director Viji for coming out with a clean film for children that is devoid of double entendre." Indian Express wrote, "On the whole, Ezhumin gives us an experience akin to watching our kids perform in a stage play. Though the story isn't flawless, the acting isn't world class and the production value isn't that great, as the curtain goes down, we cheer for them, forgetting the blemishes because we know that the kids have done their best." Times of India wrote "The movie, though offers some relevant advices about the safety of children and women, is too preachy at times. Overall, Ezhumin has only little to offer."
