= Vivegam =

2017 film directed by Siva

- Theatrical release poster
- Directed by: Siva
- Written by: Siva; Kabilan Vairamuthu; Aadhi Narayana
- Produced by: T. G. Thyagarajan; Sendhil Thyagarajan; Arjun Thyagarajan
- Starring: Ajith Kumar; Vivek Oberoi; Kajal Aggarwal; Akshara Haasan
- Cinematography: Vetri Palanisamy
- Edited by: Ruben
- Music by: Anirudh Ravichander
- Production company: Sathya Jyothi Films
- Distributed by: Sathya Jyothi Films
- Release date: 24 August 2017
- Running time: 142 minutes
- Country: India
- Language: Tamil
- Budget: ₹100–130 crore
- Box office: est. ₹125.2 crore

Vivegam (transl. Prudence) is a 2017 Indian Tamil-language action thriller film directed by Siva and produced by Sathya Jyothi Films. It stars Ajith Kumar, alongside Vivek Oberoi, Kajal Aggarwal, Akshara Haasan, Karunakaran, Aarav Chowdhary, Bharath Reddy and Sharat Saxena. The film marks the Tamil debuts of Vivek Oberoi and Akshara Haasan, as well as the only Tamil film of the former. The music was composed by Anirudh Ravichander, with the cinematography and editing handled by Vetri and Ruben.

Vivegam was released worldwide on 24 August 2017 to mixed reviews from critics and was an average grosser at the box office.

== Plot ==
Ajay "AK" Kumar, a former CTS Field Commander believed to be dead on records, intercepts an arms deal between the General Secretary of Europol police and the head of a Russian mafia gang in a dense Serbian forest and escapes with the weapons drive after eliminating the military personnel in the forest. The CTS agency learns that AK is alive after being presumed dead in a mission, where they had assigned AK's best friends and colleagues Michael, Rachael, Shawn, and the Chief Strategist Aryan Singha to track down AK.

Past: AK live a happy life with his wife Yazhini, who owns and manages an Indian restaurant. Their life is interrupted by a mission to trace Natasha, an outlaw hacker from Bulgaria who was responsible for cracking the security codes of the plutonium weapons. There have already been three man-made seismic activities caused by the explosion of plutonium bombs. Natasha is wanted by the Interpol, CIA and various other terrorist groups around the world for her hacking skills. AK's mission is to secure Natasha, thereby preventing two future seismic quakes targeted in India. AK heads to Serbia in search of Natasha and is guided by local translator Arumai APS Prakasam.

AK interrogates the hospital doctors in the city and finds that Natasha had undergone plastic surgery. An Albanian gang captures Natasha's boyfriend and tortures him to death. With the help of the pacemaker found in Natasha's boyfriend's body, AK traces Natasha and moves her to a safe house. Natasha was unaware that the code she decrypted was that of a nuclear weapon. She felt guilty and proposed to defuse the remaining weapons from a neutrino site. On their way to the site, Natasha gets killed by a group of terrorists, while Aryan, Michael, Rachael, and Shawn ambush AK. However, AK survives the ambush and recovers in the forest, where he retrieves the weapons drive during the arms exchange deal in the Serbian forest.

Present: Aryan, who is sure that AK has not discovered their betrayal as yet, send Rachel and Mike to meet AK after finding out his location, instructing them to kill AK as soon as they come into possession of the weapons drive. After they meet AK and start talking to him, AK switches on a lot of infra-red lights in the surroundings, effectively disabling the communication devices Rachel and Mike had been carrying, revealing that as he was about to fall from the top, he saw them shooting at him. Rachel and Mike realize too late that this was AK's trap all along, and they both are finished off by AK. Aryan hires a group of assassins to kill Yazhini, but AK neutralizes the assassins and saves her. Later, AK learns that Aryan and his teammates belong to a shadow government, which controls the economy of the world by war manipulation. With Yazhini's help, AK infiltrates into the CTS headquarters, where he meets Shawn and tortures him regarding the coordinates of buried weapon's location. Shawn gets killed by a time-bomb watch, while AK gets saved by Yazhini.

Aryan, as a CTS officer and shadow government agent, forces AK and Yazhini into hiding by framing AK as a wanted terrorist. AK releases a video challenging the CTS to save Aryan from being assassinated. Aryan is provided security and is not allowed to leave the building until the next 24 hours. Aryan escapes from the security by secretly killing his own guards. AK tries to stop the nuclear weapon from blasting by turning off the 10 main satellites by powerhub.

To prevent AK from continuing his job, Aryan kidnaps Yazhini and keeps her in a secret place. Aryan asks AK whether he will save Yazhini or stop the bomb. AK seeks proof for her kidnapping and Yazhini provides him with her location using morse code. AK arrives at the place, where he prevents the plutonium weapon from exploding and kills Aryan. AK, Yazhini, and their baby daughter Natasha go for a long drive, where a mission is assigned for AK.

== Cast ==
- Ajith Kumar as Ajay Kumar (AK)
- Vivek Oberoi as Aryan Singhania
- Kajal Aggarwal as Yazhini, AK's wife
- Akshara Haasan as Natasha
- Karunakaran as Arumai Prakasam (APS)
- Amila Terzimehić as Rachael
- Serge Crozon-Cazin as Michael
- Aarav Chowdhary as Shawn
- Swaminathan as Waiter
- Sharat Saxena as Maximus
- Bharath Reddy as Bharath
- Billy Murali as CTS officer
- Branka Pujić as Doctor
- Anka Gaćeša as Doctor's assistant
- Bojana Ordinačev as IT personnel
- Vojislav Tomic as IT personnel
- Katarina Gojkovic as Doctor
- Miloš Timotijević
- Radomir Petković
- Bashar Rahal as Russian Mafia Gangster
- Slobodan Stefanović as Albanian Leader
- Joakim Tasic as Hologram Boy
- Hivzo Nezirovic as Aryan's driver
- Slavisa Ivanovic as Military Officer
- Alexander Winters as Bandit
- Milan Jovanović in a special appearance

== Production ==
=== Development ===
Anirudh Ravichander was the music composer for the film, while Vetri and Ruben were signed to handle the cinematography and editing respectively. Anu Vardhan designed Ajith's costumes in the film, while Kaloyan Vodenicharov and K. Ganesh Kumar were hired as action choreographers for the film. The film's title Vivegam was announced in February 2017 and the official first-look poster was released, along with the title on 2 February 2017.

=== Filming ===
Principal photography commenced in Slovenia on 1 August 2016 and it was reported that at least 70% percent of this action thriller was to be shot in Europe. The first schedule was completed in Europe and the second schedule in Ramoji Film City in Hyderabad in October 2016. The team informed that nearly 75% of the film shot was complete and the rest of the production was ongoing in Chennai. It was reported that the film was filmed on a restricted military base in Eastern Europe. The team completed their final shoot schedule in Serbia on such locations like Belgrade city centre, Belgrade Museum of Aviation and Bor lake. Principal photography wrapped in July 2017.

== Music ==
The music was composed by Anirudh Ravichander in his second collaboration with Siva and Ajith Kumar after Vedalam. The soundtrack album features seven songs, with a theme music and a western number. The lyrics for the film was written by Kabilan Vairamuthu, Yogi B, Siva and Raja Kumari.

The first single track "Surviva" was released on 19 June 2017, which is a western-based EDM number, performed by Yogi B. The second single track "Thalai Viduthalai" was released on 10 July 2017, followed by the third single track "Kadhalaada" released on 20 July 2017. The soundtrack album in its entirety was released through the digital streaming platform JioSaavn and Sony Music India on 7 August 2017, where it received positive reviews from critics.

Vivegam

Soundtrack album by Anirudh Ravichander
- Released: 7 August 2017
- Recorded: 2017
- Studios: Albuquerque Records, Chennai
- Genre: Feature film soundtrack
- Length: 24:00
- Language: Tamil
- Label: Sony Music
- Producer: Anirudh Ravichander

Anirudh Ravichander chronology
Rum (2016)	Vivegam (2017)	Velaikkaran (2017)

Singles from Vivegam
- 1. "Surviva" Released: 19 June 2017; 2. "Thalai Viduthalai" Released: 10 July 2017; 3. "Kadhalaada" Released: 20 July 2017

=== Production ===
The song "Surviva", a western-based EDM number, was performed by Malaysian rapper Yogi B. The song contains lyrics about survival. With a tagline Believe in Yourself, this new track is believed to be along similar lines of never giving up and surviving.

The second song "Thalai Viduthalai" is in the death metal rock genre, which is based on a punchline – Never, ever GIVE UP! that became a rage after fans saw Ajith saying in a high-pitched tone in the teaser earlier. The song was written by Siva and is a highly motivating song to wake up in the morning and start your day with a new passion. The philosophy of the song is, irrespective of the number of times you have been knocked down, as long as you are willing to stand up again and fight back, you are not a failure. The heavy metal track and adrenaline pumping lyrics match the larger-than-life onscreen and off-screen image of Ajith. Besides composing tunes, Anirudh has also lent his voice to the song along with Harish Swaminathan. Anirudh quoted that, this song is a tribute and dedication to Ajith for his 25 years of grit, determination and hardwork in Tamil cinema."

The third song "Kaadhalada" is a classic number. In one of the recent interviews with a leading daily, Kabilan, who has penned the lyrics for the song, revealed how he got this opportunity. Kabilan said "I was initially called in to work on the script; I ve co-written the screenplay. That was my first job in Vivegam, and during a discussion, this opportunity to write the lyrics for a song came up." The lyricist did not reveal much about the song before its release, but opened up about the film and further added "Vivegam has come out in a very stylish manner. I'm sure it will be enjoyed by people of all ages."

The audio rights of the film were acquired by Sony Music India, for a whooping amount of ₹2 crore. Sridhar Subramanian, the CEO of Sony Music South, confirmed it on Twitter on 14 June 2017.

=== Release ===
The song teaser for the first single "Surviva" was released on 15 June 2017 at midnight. The full song was released on 19 June 2017 directly on JioSaavn, instead of YouTube, and was played over 400,000 times in just over 12 hours, according to a statement from Sony Music India, thus becoming the most played song in Saavn. The second single track "Thalai Viduthalai" was released on 10 July 2017 at midnight. The third single "Kadhalaada" was released on 20 July 2017.

=== Track listing ===
==== Tamil version ====
Sony Music India launched the album preview on 3 August 2017 on YouTube, in which the album consists of seven songs with lyrics written by Kabilan Vairamuthu, Yogi B, Siva and Raja Kumari. The album was released on 7 August 2017 at 5:00 p.m. on Saavn and later on other digital platforms.

No.	Title	Lyrics	Singer(s)	Length
1.	"Surviva"	Siva; Yogi B	Yogi B; Anirudh Ravichander; Mali Manoj	3:42
2.	"Thalai Viduthalai"	Siva	Anirudh Ravichander; Harish Swaminathan; Ajith Kumar	3:15
3.	"Kadhalaada"	Kabilan Vairamuthu	Pradeep Kumar; Shashaa Tirupati	4:16
4.	"AK Theme Music (Ready to Rage)"	Instrumental	Instrumental	1:23
5.	"Veriyera"	Siva	Anirudh Ravichander; M. M. Manasi; Poorvi Koutish	4:36
6.	"Kadhalaada (Reprise)"	Kabilan Vairamuthu	Shashaa Tirupati; Anirudh Ravichander; Narmatha; Pooja	2:18
7.	"Never Give Up"	Raja Kumari	Raja Kumari	4:30
Total length:				24:00

==== Telugu version ====
Vivekam

Soundtrack album by Anirudh Ravichander
- Released: 17 August 2017
- Genre: Feature film soundtrack
- Length: 24:00
- Language: Telugu
- Label: Sony Music
- Producer: Anirudh Ravichander

The songs of the Telugu version of the film was released on 17 August 2017 and the lyrics for the songs were written by Yogi B, Bhaskarabhatla Ravi Kumar and Ramajogayya Sastry.

No.	Title	Lyrics	Singer(s)	Length
1.	"Surviva"	Yogi B; Bhaskarbhatla Ravikumar	Anirudh Ravichander; Yogi B; Ranjith; Mali Manoj	3:42
2.	"Bhaga Bhaga"	Ramajogayya Shastry	Anirudh Ravichander; Deepak; Santosh Hariharan; Aravind Srinivas	3:15
3.	"Aanandam"	Ramajogayya Shastry	Anirudh Ravichander; Sathya Prakash; Shashaa Tirupati	4:16
4.	"AK Theme Music (Ready to Rage)"	Instrumental	Instrumental	1:23
5.	"Urakaalee"	Bhaskarbhatla Ravikumar	Anirudh Ravichander; M. M. Manasi	4:36
6.	"Aanandam (Reprise)"	Ramajogayya Shastry	Anirudh Ravichander; T.S. Sarath Santhosh; Shashaa Tirupati	2:18
7.	"Never Give Up"	Raja Kumari	Anirudh Ravichander; Raja Kumari	4:30
Total length:				24:00

==== Kannada version ====
No.	Title	Lyrics	Singer(s)	Length
1.	"Kaadu Kulithe"	Naveen	Sparsh; Ashwini	2:48
2.	"Surviva"	Pramod Jois	Shashank Sheshagiri; Chintan Vikas	3:42
3.	"Shuru Shuru Shuru"	Naveen	Sparsh	3:15
4.	"Baa Baaro"	Raju Hosetti	Lakshmi Vijay	4:37
5.	"Kaadu Kulithe (Reprise)"	Naveen; Pramod Jois	Arundhathi; Manoj Vasishta	2:15
Total length:				16:37

==== Reception ====
Professional ratings
Review scores
Source	Rating
Behindwoods	3.0/5 stars
IndiaGlitz	3.25/5 stars
Movie Crow	3.25/5 stars
Sify	4.0/5 stars
BollywoodLife	4.0/5 stars

Behindwoods gave 3/5 stars and wrote "Anirudh delivers a convincingly International album in his forte for Ajith's Vivegam!" Sharanya CR of The Times of India wrote "With Vivegam, Anirudh manages to give an album with songs that not just suit the mass image of Ajith, but also have an international appeal." Indiaglitz gave 3.25/5 stars and wrote "Vivegam is easily one of the best albums for Ajith as well as Anirudh; the album is plethora of rock and energy."MovieCrow gave 3.25/5 stars and wrote "Anirudh has delivered a stylish and engaging album to match Ajith's persona." Sify gave 4/5 stars and wrote "Anirudh adds an international flavour to a quintessential ‘mass’ album!" BollywoodLife gave 4/5 stars and wrote "Anirudh Ravichander has done it again, composed a winner of an album! He has understood the actioner's theme and the lead star perfectly and composed brilliant, foot tapping tunes. Right form death metal vibes to breezy, romantic tunes, he has given us an impressive variation. All in all, Do NOT miss the Vivegam album." IBT wrote "The album has many songs that win the hearts of the audience and it is easily one of the best albums composed by Anirudh."

== Marketing ==
The first look poster of Vivegam was released on 2 February 2017 at 12:01 AM. Ajith's physical transformation was praised, given that he had to undergo a painful knee operation in November 2015, after the release of his previous film Vedalam (2015).

The teaser trailer was released on 11 May 2017, which shows Ajith running about, flexing his muscles, dodging bullets and shooting bullets. The teaser became the fastest film teaser to reach 5 million views within 12 hours after breaking the record of 5 million views set by the Kabali (2016) teaser in 24 hours. It went on to become the most liked for an Indian film after surpassing the record of 500 thousand and more likes set by the Tubelight (2017) teaser.

The trailer was released on 17 August 2017, which shows elements of friendship, romance, sentiment and action. The trailer, which promises a "Tamil film with an international flavor, is dedicated to showing the attitude of Ajith's character that he will move mountains or die trying. He is beaten again and again, yet he keeps bouncing back.

== Release ==
=== Theatrical ===
Vivegam was released on 24 August 2017, alongside the Telugu version titled Vivekam. The film was also released in Kannada as Commando in 2018.

=== Home media ===
The satellite rights were purchased by Sun TV for a record price, which was informed through the channel's social media page on 9 August 2017.

== Reception ==
=== Box office ===
The film grossed ₹33.08 crore on its opening day and crossed the ₹100 crore mark on its first weekend.

=== Critical response ===
M. Suganth of The Times of India gave 3/5 stars and wrote "Vivegam is an over-the-top but engaging action thriller with a calculated mix of brawn and brain, action and sentiment, smartly pandering to fans while giving families something to connect with." Manoj Kumar. R of The Indian Express gave 3/5 stars and wrote "The film has good music, good visuals, high-voltage action sequences, picturesque landscapes and beautiful faces. Also add heartwarming moments between the characters of Ajith and Kajal Aggarwal to the list. Ajith and Siva get full marks for their efforts."

Sreedhar Pillai of Firstpost gave 3/5 stars and wrote "Vivegam is largely targeted at Ajith fans, and while it lacks logic it looks super stylish, and is a well-shot action entertainer." Sandeep Acharya of Hindustan Times gave 2.5/5 stars and wrote "Vivegam has rightfully come up for praise thanks for the difficult stunts that Ajith has pulled off. However, the film falls short of being great as it fares poorly in the writing department."

Sethumadhavan N of Bangalore Mirror gave 2.5/5 stars and wrote "Vivegam isn’t as entertaining as Veeram, nor is it as low on novelty like Vedalam. It tries to be an impactful spy action-thriller and on that front it scores well at least on the action front." Srivatsan of India Today gave 2.5/5 stars and wrote "With Vivegam, one hopes that Siva's trilogy aimed at making Ajith Kumar a larger-than-life character comes to an end."

Sowmya Rajendran of The News Minute wrote "Vivegam is like a circus - it has a bunch of talented performers pulling off gravity defying stunts in separate acts that are written to make the crowd clap as soon as each ends." Srinivas Ramanujan of The Hindu wrote "Vivegam is a misfire on many levels. It's an attempt to make an “international” thriller, with the assumption that a star with a huge fan base would be able to pull it off. Ajith's effort is sincere, but Vivegam just doesn't come together."

=== Accolades ===
Date of ceremony	Award	Category	Recipient(s) and nominee(s)	Result	Ref.
16 June 2018	Filmfare Awards South	Best Supporting Actor – Tamil	Vivek Oberoi	Nominated	
16 June 2018	Filmfare Awards South	Best Music Director – Tamil	Anirudh Ravichander	Nominated	
14 & 15 September 2018	South Indian International Movie Awards	Best Actor in a Negative Role – Tamil	Vivek Oberoi	Nominated	
14 & 15 September 2018	South Indian International Movie Awards	Best Music Director – Tamil	Anirudh Ravichander	Nominated	
14 & 15 September 2018	South Indian International Movie Awards	Best Cinematographer – Tamil	Vetri	Nominated	

== In popular culture ==
The line "Varen Maa" uttered by Ajith Kumar and the scene in which Kajal Aggarwal starts singing during the climax fight was parodied in Thamizh Padam 2.
