= Kembali (Feminin album) =

Studio album by Feminin
- Released: 1 February 1996
- Recorded: 1994 – 1995
- Studios: Kenny Studio; Studio 67
- Genres: Pop, R&B
- Length: 46:21
- Languages: Malay; English
- Label: Warner Music Malaysia
- Producers: Azman Abu Hassan; Goh Boon Hoe; Paul Moss

Feminin chronology
Kini (1994)	Kembali (1996)	Untukmu... Kini (2005)

Singles from Kembali
- 1. "Kehadiran" Released: 1996; 2. "Hanya Sekali" Released: 1996

Kembali (Return) is the third and final studio album by Malaysian girl group, Feminin, released on 1 February 1996 by Warner Music Malaysia. Two singles were released from the album.

== Production ==
After the release of their first two albums, Feminin decided to break off their collaboration with KRU as they were tired with hip-hop. Looking for a change, the group approached Azman Abu Hassan, Goh Boon Hoe and Paul Moss as the music producer. For the album, Feminin, through their own company Feminin Productions, conceptualised the album.

Although majority of their songs are in their native Bahasa Malaysia, the group had recorded only one track in English, entitled "Ride and Slide", marking the first time in Feminin's career that they had released an English song. The album has 11 tracks including a cover version of "Hanya Sekali", originally performed by Singaporean girl group, Ideal Sisters.

== Release and reception ==
The album was released on 1 February 1996 and was well-received, sold 30,000 copies and certified Gold.

== Track listing ==
No.	Title	Writer(s)	Length
1.	"Kehadiran"	Ahmad Izham Omar, As Muhammad	4:25
2.	"Bayangan Merbahaya"	Paul Moss, Azman Abu Hassan	4:16
3.	"Hanya Sekali"	M. Nasir	4:00
4.	"Kembali"	Mazlan Hamzah, Johan Nawawi	5:10
5.	"Ride and Slide"	Zubin	4:45
6.	"Godaan Kotaraya"	Azlina Aziz, Azman Abu Hassan	4:27
7.	"Penawar Luka"	Azman Abu Hassan	4:56
8.	"Pesanan"	Goh Boon Hoe, Zubin, Nico, Feminin	4:16
9.	"Aturkan"	Paul Moss, Huzz	4:33
10.	"Cinta Abadi"	Baby V	4:45
11.	"Lepaskan" (bonus track)	Illegal, Ahmad Izham Omar	4:30
Total length:			46:21
