= James Kearns =

James William Kearns (born 1947) is an American screenwriter. He is best known for writing the script for the film John Q. (2002) which starred Denzel Washington. He has also written several TV movies and episodes of television programs such as Mr. Belvedere, Jake and the Fatman, Highway to Heaven and Dynasty. He is a spokesperson for the Bipolar Help Center, and currently resides in Venice, California.
