= Mali (singer) =

Indian musician

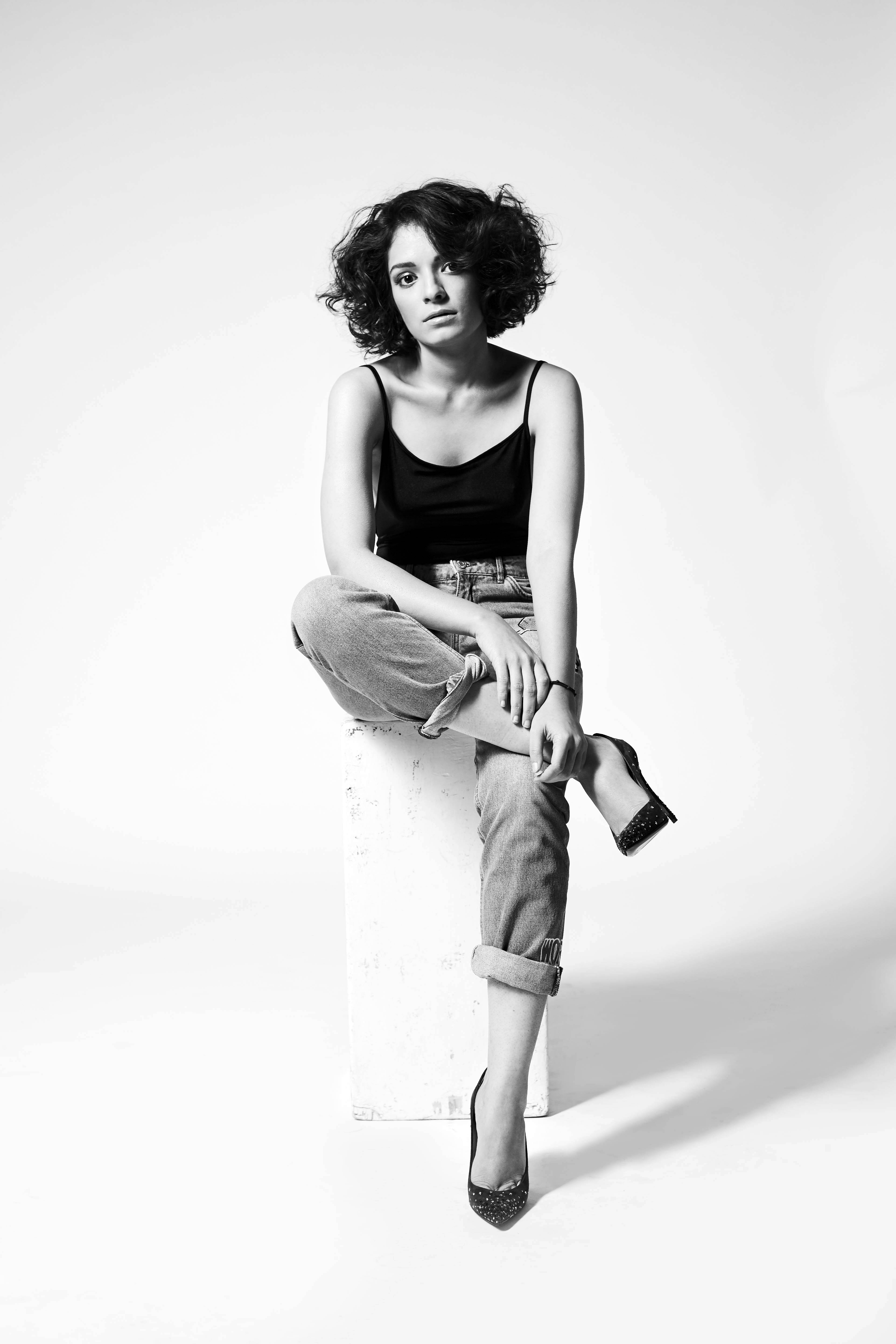
- Mali, pictured in 2017
- Born: Maalavika Manoj; 16 September 1993 (age 33); Chennai, Tamil Nadu
- Occupation: Singer-songwriter
- Years active: 2012–present
- Spouse: Sid Shirodkar (m. 2025)

Maalavika Manoj (born 16 September 1993) known professionally as Mali (/mælɪ/), is an Indian singer-songwriter based in Mumbai, Maharashtra.

== Early and personal life ==
Maalavika Manoj was born on 16 September 1993 in Chennai, Tamil Nadu to Malayali parents from North Malabar. Maalavika had been listening to music heavily since childhood. Though her parents were not musicians, they would play a lot of 1970s and 1980s style music to her. Maalavika grew up listening electronic music. When she was five years old, her parents decided to enroll her in various classes ranging from swimming and Bharatanatyam to piano and drawing classes. A few years later, she quit all of her classes other than piano, which she learned till she was 17 years old. Around that time, she also decided to try learning the guitar, because at that point she felt it was "cool".

Maalavika said she never had to seriously tell her parents that she wanted to be a musician, because "they're happy if I'm doing something I want and can sustain myself and be comfortable with a career in music." Her first singing performance was at a party when she was 12 years old. At the party, she sang Ella Fitzgerald's version of "Fever", with some of the lyrics changed to "suit the occasion". She did her schooling at Sacred Heart Matriculation School and studied for a Bachelor of Business Administration (BBA) at Loyola College, Chennai. In mid-2013, she left for France to complete her BBA degree, but returned to Chennai a year later after graduating. She graduated from Loyola in the same year, and moved to Mumbai, Maharashtra to pursue a career in music.

In late June 2024, Maalavika was engaged to composer Sid Shirodkar. She married him in February 2025.

== Career ==
In 2010, Maalavika performed at Maithri (the cultural events of Chettinad Vidyashram), and was named the "Best Vocalist". RJ Arjun Thomas heard her there and suggested that she form a band to join the radio station Chennai Live's band hunt that was taking place at the time. The band was eventually formed under the name "Bass-in-Bridge" in September 2010, with Arjun as the guitarist, Sajith Satya as the bassist, Leon James as the keyboardist, Maalavika as the vocalist and Shashank Vijay as the drummer. The name is a pun on "Basin bridge". Bass-in-Bridge was one of five underground bands (the other four being Wolf's Lair, Nailed, Blues Conscience, Blacklisted and Off the Record) that qualified for the event's finals which took place in November 2010, but Wolf's Lair emerged the winning band, with Blues Conscience and Off the Record as runners-up. Maalavika called being a finalist at the band hunt her "claim to fame". Bass-in-Bridge have also performed live at Chennai's Pasta Bar Veneto, Pondicherry's "Sec Saturday concert" and Yamaha Music Square's "Up on the Roof". In June 2011, Bass-in-Bridge performed at a music festival called "Fete de la Musique" at the Goethe Institute, Chennai. The band dissolved in the same year, with Leon, Maalavika and Sajith becoming solo artists.

Maalavika was featured in the "Sachin Anthem" composed by Dhanush, which was released in February 2012. In June 2012, she performed at the World Music Day celebrations organised by Goethe Institute and Alliance Française de Chennai in association with Unwind Center. In December 2012, she performed a few songs at a "Christmas Extravaganza" organised by Dr. John Joseph Foundation at YMCA, Vepery.

Maalavika's debut album Deceptive was to be released on 16 June 2013 at Chipstead, Taj Coromandel, but was released on iTunes a day in advance. She chose the stage name Mali. It was mixed by the US-based composer/mixer/producer Anton Pukshansky. The album also features other artists like Ujjayinee Roy, Karthick Iyer, "Ghatam" Karthik and Ed DeGenaro, all of whom helped Mali with the instrumentals. According to Mali, the album has "a mix of styles such as jazz, electronic, blues and so on" and she compares it to "a box of assorted chocolates – something for everyone". The song "No Place Like Home", which Mali considers "the tune dearest to her on the album" was composed over a period of three years; she wrote it when she was 16 years old. It took her 15 months to finish the whole album. The album has six songs, which include "This One's for You", "Deceptive", "It's Not the Same", "No Place Like Home", "Wannabe" and "Undefined". In July 2013, Mali performed at "Thank You for the Music", a tribute concert to ABBA held at Chennai's Museum Theatre.

In April 2015, Mali performed with Sapta, an independent electro-acoustic world music act, at the event "Daddy's Toxic Thursdays" in Tap Resto Bar, Mumbai. In the same month she performed at Mercedes Luxe Royale, a show sponsored by Mercedes-Benz and organised by designer Vivek Karunakaran in association with the Madras Midtown Round Table-42 at The Park in Nungambakkam, Chennai, and also at the launch event of Anams Man's Spring-Summer Collection held at ITC Grand Chola. Mali performed the song "Walk Away" during the third season of the Kappa TV show Music Mojo. In November, she performed the song "Deen", in collaboration with rapper Sofia Ashraf and Sapta. By January 2016, Mali had joined "The Diva Collective", a collaboration between several Chennai-based female vocalists. In September 2016, she released a single titled "Dreaming".

The five-track EP Rush, which had been in development as early as October 2015, was released on 27 January 2017. "Dreaming", originally released as a single, was included on this EP. The title track of this album was later ranked second in Rolling Stone India's list of "10 Best Indian Singles of 2017". In February 2017, Sony Music India released "Onnume Aagala", a duet single between Mali and Anirudh Ravichander on YouTube. In April 2018, Mali released "Play", a single which had her grandfather M. C. Rammohan as featured artist, playing the harmonica. In August 2019, she released a new single titled "Mango Showers". In March 2020, Mali was selected to be part of Spotify's prestigious RADAR program "Age of Limbo", the first single from her next album Caution to The Wind, was released in April 2020. In February 2021, Mali was featured in India's Forbes 30 Under 30 list. The complete Caution to The Wind album was released in April 2021.

In 2023, Mali performed at the first edition of Lollapalooza India in Mumbai, and at the opening of the Nita Mukesh Ambani Cultural Center. She was also chosen to represent Apple Music India and showcase her music-making process to Apple CEO Tim Cook during his visit to India. Mali also appeared in a commercial promoting Škoda India. Later that year, she received a nomination at the EMA Awards in the category of Best India Act. In 2024, Mali won the MTV Europe Music Award for Best Indian Act. In 2026, her latest album Where Was I? was released.

== Musical style ==
Mali's songs are usually inspired by melancholy. She describes "over-thinking" as "[o]ne of [her] weaknesses or strengths". On her songwriting style, she told The Telegraph, "When I start over-thinking, my best form of closure is writing it down. Once I write it all down, I feel I have expressed myself... literally crying to your friend when you are sad." In an interview with The Hindu, she described Skrillex, Hillsong, A. R. Rahman and Alanis Morissette as some of her influences in music, but noted that her "real inspiration to write music comes from situations or feelings that really strike a chord deep inside me". According to Suraksha P of The New Indian Express, Mali also takes inspiration from artists like Stevie Nicks, Joss Stone, Norah Jones, Katie Melua and Ella Fitzgerald. In an interview with The Times of India, the latter described Stone, Melua, Andrea Corr, Fitzgerald and Sara Bareilles as her favourite artists. In an interview with Deccan Chronicle, Mali described The Corrs, Morissette, Savage Garden, Backstreet Boys and ABBA as her early inspirations. According to Garvita Sharma of The Times of India, Mali's compositions are inspired by the changes in her life, which include "moving to a different place" or "going through a break-up".

== Other works ==
Although primarily an independent musician, Mali has sung for a few feature films in Tamil. Her first film song was "Come on Girls", composed by Anirudh Ravichander for 3 (2012), although she considers her role in the song to be small. (Note: Although 3 was released in March 2012, its album was released in December 2011.) Her other film songs include "Yeda Kuda..." from Kaliyugam, "Vaazhkaiye" composed by Vijay Antony for Haridas (2013), "Yaen Endral" from Idharkuthane Aasaipattai Balakumara, and "Hi My Name Is Malini" by Aravind-Shankar Malini 22 Palayamkottai (2014). After a brief hiatus, she returned to singing for films with two Harris Jayaraj compositions: "Irumugan Settai" for Iru Mugan (2016), and "He's My Hero" for Si3 in the same year. In November 2012, Mali was a speaker at the TEDxYouth@Chennai conference. In March 2013, she was a speaker at Ventura 2013, an international business plan competition organised by the Entrepreneurship Cell of National Institute of Technology, Tiruchirappalli.

== Discography ==
Singles and albums

Song	Year	Single/Album	Ref.
"Dreaming"	2017	Rush	
"Poor Girl's Dream"	2017	Rush	
"Changed Situations"	2017	Rush	
"Rush"	2017	Rush	
"Sooner or Later"	2017	Rush	
"Play"	2018	Non-album single	
"Mango Showers"	data-sort-value="" style="background: var(--background-color-interactive, #ececec); color: var(--color-base, inherit); vertical-align: middle; text-align: center; " class="table-na" | Non-album single		
"Mundane"	2020	Caution To The Wind	
"Absolute"	2020	Caution To The Wind	
"Age of Limbo"	2020	Caution To The Wind	
"Horoscope"	2020	Caution To The Wind	
"Really? Not Really"	2020	Caution To The Wind	
"Live Again"	2021	Caution To The Wind	
"Cabaret"	2021	Caution To The Wind	
"Sitting on the Fence"	2021	Caution To The Wind	
"Ashes"	data-sort-value="" style="background: var(--background-color-interactive, #ececec); color: var(--color-base, inherit); vertical-align: middle; text-align: center; " class="table-na" | Non-album single		
"Absolute (Apple Music Home Session)"	2023	Apple Music Home Session: Mali	
"Mundane (Apple Music Home Session)"	2023	Apple Music Home Session: Mali	
"Never Gonna Give You Up (Apple Music Home Session)"	2023	Apple Music Home Session: Mali	
"Semi Automatic Butane"	data-sort-value="" style="background: var(--background-color-interactive, #ececec); color: var(--color-base, inherit); vertical-align: middle; text-align: center; " class="table-na" | Non-album single		
"Walk Away"	data-sort-value="" style="background: var(--background-color-interactive, #ececec); color: var(--color-base, inherit); vertical-align: middle; text-align: center; " class="table-na" | Non-album single		
"Ashes"	data-sort-value="" style="background: var(--background-color-interactive, #ececec); color: var(--color-base, inherit); vertical-align: middle; text-align: center; " class="table-na" | Non-album single		
"Just for Once"	data-sort-value="" style="background: var(--background-color-interactive, #ececec); color: var(--color-base, inherit); vertical-align: middle; text-align: center; " class="table-na" | Non-album single		
"Dr. Dust"	data-sort-value="" style="background: var(--background-color-interactive, #ececec); color: var(--color-base, inherit); vertical-align: middle; text-align: center; " class="table-na" | Non-album single		

Film songs

Song	Year	Album	Composer	Ref.
"Come on Girls"	2011	3	Anirudh Ravichander	
"Vaazhkaiye"	2012	Haridas	Vijay Antony	
"Yaen Endral"	2013	Idharkuthane Aasaipattai Balakumara	Siddharth Vipin	
"Hi My Name is Malini"	2013	Malini 22 Palayamkottai	Aravind-Shankar	
"Irumugan Settai"	2016	Iru Mugan	Harris Jayaraj	
"He's My Hero"	2016	Si3	Harris Jayaraj	
"Onnume Aagale"	2017	Independent Album For Valentines Day	Anirudh Ravichander	
"Surviva"	2017	Vivegam	Anirudh Ravichander	
"Peela Peela"	2018	Thaanaa Serndha Koottam	Anirudh Ravichander	
"Dei Machan Dev"	2019	Dev	Harris Jayaraj	
"Mange Manzooriyan (Female)"	2022	Badhaai Do	Khamosh Shah	
"You and Me"	2023	Irugapatru	Justin Prabhakaran	
