= Raihan =

Malaysian music group

- Origin: Malaysia
- Genres: Nasyid
- Years active: 1996–present
- Label: Warner Music Malaysia
- Members: Che Amran Idris; Abu Bakar Md Yatim; Fadzli Aziz
- Past members: Azahari Ahmad; Nazrey Johani; Nordin Jaafar; ZulFadhli Mustaza; Amran Ibrahim

Raihan (derived from the Arabic word Rayḥān (Arabic: رَيـحَـان), "Fragrance of Heaven") is a Malaysian nasheed group, originally composed of five members, that became popular in Malaysia with the release of their debut album Puji-Pujian in October 1996. The group's original line-up comprised Nazrey Johani, Che Amran Idris, Abu Bakar Md Yatim, Amran Ibrahim, and Azhari Ahmad as the leader. Produced by Farihin Abdul Fattah, Puji-Pujian grossed sales of more than 750,000 units in Malaysia, and 3,500,000 units old worldwide, which makes them the most successful Malaysian music group in terms of album sales.

On 29 August 2001, founding member Azhari Ahmad died of a myocardial infarction (heart attack) shortly after attending the Era Awards ceremony in Genting Highlands, Pahang.

The remaining four members continued releasing albums. Raihan has released of 11 albums and won many awards in Malaysia. Raihan has won AIM Anugerah Kembara three times for their extensive international tours.

Nazrey Johani resigned from Raihan and was replaced by Nordin Jaafar (who resigned in early January 2007). Zulfadhli also is no longer with Raihan since November 2015.

== Achievements ==
=== International performances ===
In 1997, they were invited by Queen Elizabeth II to perform at Commonwealth Heads of Government Meeting in Edinburgh where they also received an honorary letter from Prince Charles for their performance in Commonwealth in Concert. The following year, they met the Queen during her visit to Malaysia for the 1998 Commonwealth Games in Kuala Lumpur. The group recorded two songs (Seal of The Prophet and God Is The Light) with Yusuf Islam in their second album Syukur.

=== Platinum status ===
Raihan is one of the most successful music groups in Malaysia. The debut album, Puji-Pujian is the highest selling album in Malaysia with a total sale of 3,500,000 units thus gaining 12 times Platinum status and Double Platinum in Singapore. In Indonesia, their fourth album, Koleksi Nasyid Terbaik sold more than 200,000 units and their tenth album, Bacalah sold more than 70,000 units.

=== World tour ===
Raihan is the third Malaysian group to perform at the Royal Albert Hall after Siti Nurhaliza and late Sudirman Arshad, and the first artist to perform for the second time (in 2008) for Evening of Inspiration for Islamic Relief UK, when they also launched their twelfth album, Selawat for the celebration of Mawlid. In 2004, they toured France covering seven cities: Bordeaux, Marseille, Nantes, Strasbourg, Lille, Lyon and Paris. They also had a road tour in United Kingdom in cities, including Glasgow, Edinburgh, Manchester, Birmingham, Cardiff, Bristol and Wembley. On 16 July 2005, they were invited to perform at Canada's Wonderland in Toronto to entertain Muslim visitors. They have performed in: Australia, Canada, China, France, Great Britain, Hong Kong, Indonesia, Ireland, Kuwait, Russia, Singapore, Saudi Arabia, South Africa, Thailand, Trinidad and Tobago and United States. By 2005, they have performed in Indonesia more than ten times, Thailand six times, United Kingdom four times and South Africa three times.

== International tours ==
- Singapore Indoor Stadium (Debut Live Concert)
- Commonwealth Conference in Edinburgh (1997)
- Royal Albert Hall London, Manchester, Glasgow, Birmingham and Bristol (UK)
- Cape Town, Durban and Johannesburg (South Africa)
- Brunei Darussalam
- Moscow, Saratov and Mahachkala, Russia
- Trinidad and Tobago, South America
- Toronto, Canada
- Aceh, Medan, Padang, Palembang, Riau, Batam, Bandung, Jakarta, Solo, Jogjakarta, Surabaya, Balikpapan, Gorontalo, Fakfak, Irian Jaya (Indonesia)
- Bangkok, Patani, Narathiwat, Yala, Satun, Thailand
- Kuwait City
- Dubai, Abu Dhabi, UAE.
- Damascus, Syria
- Algiers, Constantine, Algeria
- Hong Kong
- Paris, Bordeaux, Marseille, Nantes, Lille, Strasbourg, France
- Perth, Brisbane, Melbourne, Sydney, Australia

== Awards ==
Anugerah Industri Muzik Malaysia (Music Industry Awards)

- Best New Group (1998)
- Best Nasyid Album (Puji-Pujian) (1998)
- Best Album (Puji-Pujian) (1998)
- Kembara (Explorer) Award (1998)
- Best Duo/Group Vocal Performance in an Album (Syukur) (1999)
- Best Nasyid Album (Syukur) (1999)
- Best Duo/Group Vocal Performance in an Album (Senyum) (2000)
- Best Nasyid Album (Senyum) (2000)
- Kembara (Explorer) Award (2001)
- Best Duo/Group Vocal Performance in an Album (Demi Masa) (2002)
- Best Nasyid Album (Gema Alam) (2004)
- Best Duo/Group Vocal Performance in an Album (Allahu) (2005)
- Best Nasyid Album (Allahu) (2005)
- Best Nasyid Album (Ameen) (2006)
- Kembara (Explorer) Award (2006)
- Best Nasyid Album (Tawakkal) (2007)
- Best Nasyid Song 2009
- Malaysia's best selling album ever (PUJI-PUJIAN – 1.5Mil units) and total album sales of 3.5 million units (to date);
- Starred in Malaysia's first movie with a totally Islamic theme, SYUKUR 21;
- Won many local industry music awards for a variety of achievements including Best Album, Best Vocals, Album of the Year and Most Travelled Artistes, travelled in all six continents;
- Accorded the Malaysian Book of Records' Fastest Selling Album (Jan 1997)
- Awarded the Mahabbah award in Dubai (2006)
- Defined the Contemporary Nasyeed music genre, becoming the trendsetters and inspiring many local and international nasyeed acts
- Being the preferred benchmark for nasyeed repertoire and performances
- Appointed Peace Ambassadors representing Malaysia by the Prime Minister's Department (2006);
- Launching the annual RAIHAN World Tours (2006) and most significant of all (but seldom mentioned) – inspiring millions of lives to constantly become better Muslims.
- Listed in 50 faces of Malaysia 2008
- Listed in The 500 Most Influential Muslims in the World 2008, 2009, 2010

== Albums ==
Album information	Track listing
Puji-Pujian: Release Year: 1996	10 Tracks: 1. Puji-Pujian; 2. Peristiwa Subuh; 3. Iman Mutiara; 4. Sifat 20; 5. Rakan Selawat (Kenangan); 6. Sesungguhnya; 7. Rayuan Rindu; 8. Rakan Selawat (Maulid); 9. Kembali; 10. Assolatuwassalam
Syukur: Release Year: 1997	12 Tracks: 1. Syukur; 2. Balada Selawat; 3. Khabar Iman; 4. Kita Hamba; 5. Thank You Allah; 6. Seal Of The Prophets; 7. Rukun Kita; 8. Odei Anak; 9. Damba Cinta Mu; 10. 25 Rasul; 11. God is the Light; 12. Syukur (acapella)
Senyum: Release Year: 1999	11 Tracks: 1. Bismillah; 2. Senyum; 3. Tak Selamanya; 4. Nabi Anak Yatim; 5. Cinta Hakiki; 6. Bersatu; 7. Anak Permata; 8. 10 Malaikat; 9. Cahaya Selawat; 10. Ya Rasullallah; 11. Bismillah (acapella)

- 01. Puji-Pujian (1996)
- 02. Syukur (1997)
- 03. Senyum (1999)
- 04. Maafkan [with NowSeeHeart, Ajai, Rem, Amir and Man Bai] (1999)
- 05. Koleksi Nasyid Terbaik (compilation) (2000)
- 06. Syukur 21 [Syukur 21 film soundtrack] (2000)
- 07. Demi Masa (2001)
- 08. Gema Alam (2002)
- 09. Brotherhood (2003) [International Release]
- 10. Allahu (2004)
- 11. Ameen (2005)
- 12. Iqra'-Bacalah [Koleksi Terbaik Raihan 1 Dekad] (2005)
- 13. Tawakal (2006)
- 14. The Spirit Of Shalawat (2008)
- 15. Musafir Perjuangan (2010)
- 16. Zikir Teraphy (2011)
- 17. Lagu-Lagu Hafalan (2011)
