= Anugerah Industri Muzik =

Malaysian music award ceremony

- Awarded for: Outstanding achievements in the Malaysian music industry.
- Country: Malaysia
- Presented by: Recording Industry Association of Malaysia
- First award: 1993
- Website: aim.org.my

Television/radio coverage
- Network: RTM; Media Prima; Astro

Anugerah Industri Muzik ('Music Industry Award'), or AIM, is an award ceremony which celebrates the Malaysian music industry. The award is organized by the Recording Industry Association of Malaysia (RIM) and was first held on 15 December 1993. It is Malaysia's equivalent of the Grammy awards. The award is not only focused on Malay-language music produced in Malaysia but also music in English, Chinese, and Indian languages. Separate awards were introduced for the latter two language music subcategories in 1999 and 2013 respectively. One of these, known as the AIM Chinese Music Awards, was held in 1999 and 2001 before encountering a twelve-year hiatus due to insufficient funds.)

The broadcaster of the award has been changed several times, varying between RTM, Media Prima, and Astro.

Since its introduction, the award has been held every year, with the exception of 1994 and 2015, due to changes in the month of the ceremony. The 2016–2018 edition of AIM was not held due to financial constraints.

== Categories ==
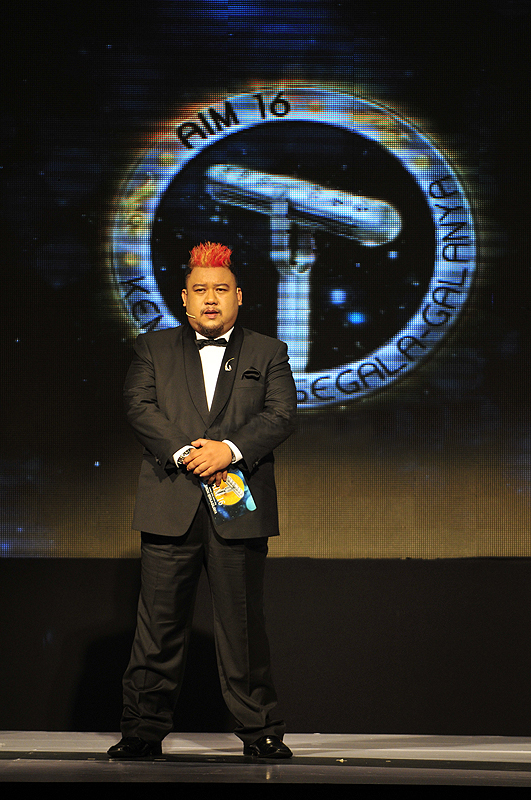
Afdlin Shauki hosting Anugerah Industri Muzik in 2009

During the first award ceremony in 1993, there were only ten categories. After the first award, the category for Best New Artist (Solo) was split into male and female categories, until 1999. Another category which existed until 1999 was Best New Artist (Group). Genre-specific best albums were introduced in 1995 and abolished in 2010 due to a declining number of albums released. The focus on Best Vocal Performance was changed from album to single in 2009. A Best Indonesian Album category was introduced in 1997, and was replaced by Best Malay Song Performed by a Foreign Artist in 2008 until 2013/2014. RIM has since added five new categories that recognize achievements by songs and music videos based on digital sales on all digital platforms. These new awards recognize significant contributions by record labels in the local music industry and provide opportunities to the public to be the jury through a new category, Best Malaysian Singer.

The current awards presented in Anugerah Industri Muzik are:

Main awards:

- Best Album (Album of the Year)
- Best Song (Song of the Year)

Performance awards:

- Best New Artiste
- Best Vocal Performance in a Song (Male)
- Best Vocal Performance in a Song (Female)
- Best Vocal Performance in a Song (Group)
- Best Duo/Collaboration Vocal Performance in a Song

Technical achievements awards:

- Best Album Cover
- Best Engineered Album
- Best Music Video
- Best Musical Arrangement in a Song

Best songs according to genres

- Best Pop Song
- Best Rock Song
- Best Hip Hop Song
- Best Ethnic Pop Song
- Best Nasyid Song
- Best Local English Song

Popularity awards

- Most Downloaded Song
- Most Streamed Song
- Most Viewed Official Music Video on YouTube
- Best Selling Ring Tone Song
- Best Malaysian Singer (The nominees are among the Best Vocal Performance in a Song (Male & Female) finalists)

Special awards

- Sri Wirama Award (for outstanding contributions to the Malaysian music industry)
- Kembara Award (for a Malaysian artist responsible for promoting Malaysian compositions outside the country; not awarded every year)

== Past winners ==
As of 2024, unlike similar music awards in other countries, no artist had won Best Album and Best Song in the same year.

=== Best Album ===
Siti Nurhaliza has the most wins in this category with seven including one for her duet album, Seri Balas with Noraniza Idris, out of nine nominations. Faizal Tahir comes second with two wins.

Year	Album	Artist	Producer(s)
1994	Dekat Padamu	Ning Baizura	J.P Abdullah
1995	Gamal	Zainal Abidin	Roslan Aziz
1996	Unplugged – Gema Di Timur Jauh	Search	Search
1997	Ooh! La! La!	KRU	KRU
1998	Puji-Pujian	Raihan	Farihin Abd. Fattah & Nasser Abd Kassim
1999	Adiwarna	Siti Nurhaliza	Azmeer, LY, Malek Osman, Adnan Abu Hassan, Salman, Ferdi Khalid NS, Azlan Abu Hassan, Johari Teh, Zuriani
2000	Seri Balas	Noraniza Idris & Siti Nurhaliza	Pak Ngah
2001	Iqrar 1421	Rabbani	Permata Audio Production (M) Sdn. Bhd.
2002	Phoenix Bangkit	M. Nasir	M. Nasir
2003	Sarah	Siti Sarah	Aalva Jitab, Aidit Alfian, Ajai, Along Exists, Azmeer, Belle, Edry Hashim, Helen Yap
2004	E.M.A.S	Siti Nurhaliza	Ajai, Aidit Alfian, Aubrey Suwito, Azmeer, Helen Yap, Julfekar, Wong, Zulkefli Majid, Zuriani
2005	Nazraku	Spider	Spider
2006	Gemilang	Jaclyn Victor	Aidit Alfian, Ajai, Azlan Abu Hassan, Edry Hashim, Jenny Chin, Mohariz Yaakup, Ramli M.S., Aubrey Suwito, Sunil Kumar, Michael Simon, Ahmad Izham
2007	Transkripsi	Siti Nurhaliza	Siti Nurhaliza, Aubrey Suwito, Jenny Chin, Mac Chew, Yasin, Cat Farish, Firdaus Mahmud, Damian VE
2008	Aku.Muzik.Kamu	Faizal Tahir	Ahmad Izham Omar, Faizal Tahir
2009	Lentera Timur	Siti Nurhaliza	Siti Nurhaliza, Adnan Abu Hassan, Aubrey Suwito, Fauzi Marzuki, Johan Nawawi, Johari Teh, M. Nasir, S. Atan, Zul Mahat
2010	Adrenalin	Faizal Tahir	Faizal Tahir, Audi Mok, Ahmad Izham Omar
2010/2011	MPO Celebrates 25 Years of Sheila Majid	Sheila Majid	
2011/2012	Salam Musik	Salammusik	
2012/2013	Luahan Hati Anak Seni	Hafiz	
2013/2014	Fragmen	Siti Nurhaliza	Aubrey Suwito, Faizal Tahir, Mujahid, Mike Chan, Ade Govinda, Siti Nurhaliza
2014/2016	Dato' Siti Nurhaliza Unplugged	Siti Nurhaliza	Siti Nurhaliza, Mujahid Abd Wahab, Aubrey Suwito & Hafiz Hamidun
2021/2022	Yonny (Deluxe version)	Yonnyboii	Yonnyboii & Wolfy
2022/2024	Belagu II	Dayang Nurfaizah	Aubrey Suwito

=== Best Song ===
Since its inauguration, the award was only given to songwriters, until the 2010–2011 edition, in which singers also received the trophy. Beginning the 2009 edition, the category's nominees have comprised winners for Best Ethnic Pop Song, Best Hip Hop Song, Best Nasyid Song, Best Pop Song, and Best Rock Song. From 2012–2013 onward, the winner of the Best Local English Song was included in the Best Song nominee list.

The composer Azlan Abu Hassan is the record holder for most wins, with four. In 2013–2014, "No More" by SonaOne became the first English-language song to be awarded this title.

Year	Song	Artist(s)	Composer(s)	Lyricist(s)
1994	"Satu"	S.M. Salim & Zainal Abidin	Roslan Aziz	Nizam & Zainal Abidin
1995	"Mentera Semerah Padi"	M. Nasir	M. Nasir	Nurbisa
1996	"Jentayu"	Johan Nawawi, Nora & Sheila Majid	Johan Nawawi	Usman Awang
1997	"Jerat Percintaan"	Siti Nurhaliza	Adnan Hj. Hassan	Osman Hj. Zainuddin, Hani MJ
1998	"Selamanya"	Innuendo	Azlan Abu Hassan	Rizal Kamaruzzaman / Cahaya Pena / Azlan Abu Hassan
1999	"Aku Cinta Aku Rindu"	Ajai & Nurul	Ajai	Ajai & Nurul
2000	"Ku Mohon"	Sheila Majid	Mac Chew	Sheila Majid
2001	"Menyemai Cinta Bersamamu"	Nora	Azlan Abu Hassan	Ucu (Ishak Ahmad)
2002	"Seandainya Masih Ada Cinta"	Dayang Nurfaizah	Ajai	Syed ENV
2003	"Keabadian Cinta"	Anuar Zain	Azlan Abu Hassan	Azalea
2004	"Selagi Ada Cinta"	Ning Baizura	Ajai	Nurul
2005	"Awan Yang Terpilu"	Ning Baizura	Lin Li Zhen	Loloq
2006	"Warkah Buat Laila"	Zahid	Ayub Ibrahim	Habsah Hassan
2007	"Juwita...Citra Terindah"	M. Nasir	M. Nasir	M. Nasir
2008	"Izinku Pergi"	Kaer Azami	Azlan Abu Hassan	Sulu Sarawak
2009	"Nafas Cahaya"	Misha Omar	M. Nasir	Loloq
2010	"Dan Sebenarnya"	Yuna	Yuna	Yuna
2010/2011	"Sedetik Lebih" (Note: In 2011, the Best Song award was originally given to Penakut by Yuna. However, the announcement was later found out to be a technical error on behalf of the awards' official external auditor, Ernst & Young. The co-manager for the award, Rosmin Hashim, had explained that the winner of the Best Song award had to be selected from the most voted out of five song entries in each of four subcategories: Best Pop Song, Best Rock Song, Best Ethnic Pop Song, and Best Nasyid Song, in which Penakut did not win any of them. The award was later given instead to Sedetik Lebih by Anuar Zain.)	Anuar Zain	Edry Abdul Halim	Edry Abdul Halim
2011/2012	"Patah Seribu"	Shila Amzah	Shila Amzah	Shila Amzah
2012/2013	"Lelaki"	Yuna	Yuna	Yuna
2013/2014	"No More"	SonaOne	SonaOne	SonaOne
2014/2016	"Sejati"	Faizal Tahir	Faizal Tahir & Mike Chan	Faizal Tahir & Mike Chan
2021/2022	"Goodbye, Hello"	Syamel & Ernie Zakri	Ernie Zakri, Syamel, Faizal Tahir & Mike Chan	Ernie Zakri, Syamel, Faizal Tahir & Mike Chan
2022/2024	"Jangan Mati Rasa Itu"	Aina Abdul	Aina Abdul	Aina Abdul

=== Best Engineered Album (Best Album Recording) ===
As one of the original categories in AIM, this category focuses on the technical aspects and the quality of an album recording. The award is given to the sound engineer(s) and the recording artist.

Year	Album	Artist	Engineers(s)
1994	Dunia Iklim	Iklim	Ahmad Zairi Ariffin, Peter Chong
1995	Gamal	Zainal Abidin	Guy Gray
1996	Di Suatu Hari Di Suatu Waktu	Teacher's Pet	Dot, Amir, Razman
1997	Ooh! La! La!	KRU	Edry Abdul Halim, Izan, Jongass, Martin, Horenburg, Steve Hall
1998	Innuendo	Innuendo	Illegal, Paul Moss, Remy Loh, Azlan Abu Hassan
1999	The Way We Jam	KRU	Edry Abdul Halim
2000	EL	Ella	Greg Henderson
2001	The World Is Yours	Poetic Ammo	Paul Morrison, Yogi B, C Loco
2002	Plan B	Too Phat	Illegal, Eka Shereen, Tham
2003	Mata Satu	Tribe	Jig, Omie, Bong, Dino, Aliff
2004	Monumental	Reshmonu	Hiresh, Chi Too, Simon Damian
2005	Puteri	Zainal Abidin	Mac Chew
2006	Kasih	Dayang Nurfaizah	Jenny Chin, Zailan Razak, Rosli Selasih
2007	Analogi	Kristal	Bong
2008	After8	Liang	Nick Lee, JD Wong, Illegal
2009	Harapan	Reshmonu	Hiresh, Murali, Will Quinell, CL Toh
2010	Into... Akasha	Akasha	Greg Henderson
2010/2011	Realize	Reza Salleh	
2011/2012	Hikmah	Nora Ariffin	Rahmad Ayob
2012/2013	Luahan Hati Anak Seni	Hafiz	CL Toh
2013/2014	Konsert Lentera Timur Dato' Siti Nurhaliza Bersama Orkestra Tradisional Malaysia	Siti Nurhaliza	Greg Henderson
2014/2016	Panic Bird	Froya	Lee Williams, Paul Morisson, Sel Gana, Drew Adams, Ivan Cheong
2021/2022	Belagu	Dayang Nurfaizah	Simon Khoo, Ari Renaldi, Aubrey Suwito
2022/2024	Imaji (Deluxe Edition)	Aina Abdul	Imamz, Peter Chong, Ezra Kong

=== Kembara Award ===
Year	Artist(s)
1996	Sheila Majid
1997	Slam
1998	Raihan
1999	KRU
2000	Siti Nurhaliza
2001	Raihan
2002	M. Nasir
2003	Too Phat
2004	Siti Nurhaliza
2005	Siti Nurhaliza
2006	Raihan
2008	Pop Shuvit
2010	Bunkface
2010/2011	Yuna
2011/2012	Mizz Nina
2012/2013	Shila Amzah
2014/2016	Yuna
