= Innuendo (group) =

Malaysian boy band

- Origin: Kuala Lumpur, Malaysia
- Genres: Pop, R&B, soul
- Instruments: Vocals
- Years active: 1992–2005, 2017
- Label: Positive Tone
- Past members: Sham Azhar "Sam" Nazeer; Ahmad Tajuddin "Taj" Mohamed Tahir; Saiful Amir "Pot" Abdul Wahab; Reymee Hussein

Innuendo was a Malaysian boy band, best known for their cover of Carefree's evergreen ballad, "Belaian Jiwa", and their '70s style single, "Only Dancin'".

== Career ==
Innuendo was formed in 1992 when a love for R&B and soul music brought Reymee bin Mohamed Hussein, Sham Azhar(Sam), Ahmad Tajuddin Bin Mohamed Tahir (Taj Addin) and Saiful Amir bin Abd Wahab (Pot Amir) together. As a group which contributed in the re-introduction of the local boy-band scene, Innuendo also successfully re-introduced a cappella tunes to Malaysian audiences after decades of being unheard of in mainstream media. After the departure of the fourth member, Sam, on August 20, 2002, this local harmony quartet-turned-trio continued with a new album, BrandNuEndo, and performed at award shows including AIM 2002 (Anugerah Industri Musik 2002) where they also picked up an award, and venues around the country including at Planet Hollywood every Sunday in August 2002.

== Discography ==
- Innuendo
- Innuendo Enhanced
- Brandnuendo
