= Positive Tone =

Malaysian record label

- Founded: 1993
- Founder: Jeff Siah, Kenny Tay
- Defunct: 2003
- Status: Inactive
- Distributor: EMI Music Publishing Sdn. Bhd.
- Genre: Various
- Country of origin: Malaysia
- Location: Kuala Lumpur, Malaysia

Positive Tone Sdn. Bhd. was a Malaysian record label, established in 1993 by Jeff Siah and Kenny Tay.

The label's first release is Leonard Tan's debut album. After Paul Moss and Ahmad Izham Omar joined Positive Tone, the label become one of Malaysia's top recording companies. In 1998, Positive Tone was acquired by EMI Malaysia, after the 1997 Asian financial crisis.

Some of the company's famous act includes Too Phat, Poetic Ammo, Reefa, VE, Ruffedge, Juliet the Orange, Nicestupidplayground and Innuendo. The label was closed in 2003, and all Positive Tone artists were absorbed into EMI Music Malaysia. As part of EMI's withdrawal from Southeast Asia market in 2008, EMI Music Malaysia was closed. The compilation album Best of Positive Tone was the last album to be released by EMI Music Malaysia.

== Notable artists ==
=== Solo ===
- Ferhad
- Deanna Yusoff
- Sarimah Ibrahim
- Leonard Tan
- Reefa
- Liza Aziz

=== Group ===
- Too Phat
- Poetic Ammo
- Teh Tarik Crew
- OAG
- Innuendo
- Pop Shuvit
- V.E.
- Ruffedge
- Juliet The Orange
- Nice Stupid Playground
- Naughtius Maximus
- John's Mistress
- Emberz of Soul

== See also ==
- List of record labels
