= Freakshow Vol. 1: Tales of the Travelling Tunes =

Studio album by Pop Shuvit
- Released: November 15, 2007
- Recorded: 2004–2007
- Studios: Studio 21:05 (Taman Tun Dr. Ismail, Kuala Lumpur)
- Genres: Rock, hip hop
- Length: 47:55
- Labels: Shuvit Management; YZ International
- Producer: Pop Shuvit

Pop Shuvit chronology
| All I Got Hip-Hop Collaboration (2006) | Freakshow Vol. 1: Tales of the Travelling Tunes (2007) | Cherry Blossom Love Affair (2011) |

Singles from Freakshow Vol. 1: Tales of the Travelling Tunes
- 1. "Rockera" Released: 2006; 2. "Freakshow" Released: 2007; 3. "Marabahaya" Released: August 2007; 4. "Suara Kaki Lima" Released: September 2007

Freakshow Vol. 1: Tales of the Travelling Tunes is the fourth studio album by Malaysian rock band Pop Shuvit, released on 15 November 2007 by their own record label, Shuvit Management. The album contains five songs previously included in their third album, Amped & Dangerous (2006) and features a collaboration with numerous international acts.

== Production ==
Freakshow Vol. 1: Tales of the Travelling Tunes was heavily influenced by Pop Shuvit. The band become the album's producer, replacing Greg Henderson, who had produced their first three albums. In an interview, Moots! revealed that the album was the band's third Malaysian release. He said: "It's [a] bit confusing because this is our fourth album but it's the third for the Malaysian market. The previous album, Amped & Dangerous, was recorded for the Japanese market. We have different (musical) styles for Japan and Malaysia – hard rock for Japan and hip hop for Malaysia". He also decribed their "new album is something completely different because it's a concept album". Of all 13 tracks in Freakshow Vol. 1, five of them were previously included in Amped & Dangerous.

The band also described Freakshow Vol. 1 as a "straight up, hip hop album". For the album, they decided on a collaboration album with international artists, eventually working with Dabo (Japan), Silksounds (Thailand), Ahli Fiqir (Singapore), Ras Muhamad (Indonesia), Wu-Tang Clan's Inspectah Deck (United States) and Nitro Y Fanta (Puerto Rico). Two songs in the album, "All I Got" and "Rockera" had the band sings in English whereas Dabo and Nitro Y Fanta sings in their respective native languages. "Pump Up the Stereo" was revised and remixed in a hip-hop version featuring Joe Flizzow of Too Phat and DJ Cheapshot from Styles of Beyond, and made exclusively for the Freakshow Vol. 1 album. "Anthem Revisited" featuring Vandal, and "Old Skool Rocka Jam" serves as the remakes of respective songs "Skaters' Anthem" (from their debut album Take It & Shuvit) and "Old Skool Rocka" (from their second album Here & Now). Emmett from Butterfingers were featured on "Motherland", marking the band's second collaboration with him after "Kaleidoscope" from Take It & Shuvit album.

Upon the band's request, Inspectah Deck from American hip-hip collective, the Wu-Tang Clan was chosen as their duet partner for "Piece of the Pie", which originally titled "Piece of Cake" before changed to "Piece of the Pie", during the song's recording. The album is also their first album to have Malay-languaged songs. "All I Got" was reworked and produced in Malay version and titled as "Suara Kaki Lima", featuring Singaporean hip-hop group Ahli Fiqir.

== Release and reception ==
The album was released on 15 November 2007. To promote the album, the band toured three states of Malaysia - Penang, Kuala Lumpur and Malacca to performe at the Pop Shuvit Freakshow Tour.

"All I Got", "Rockera" and "Freakshow" was released as singles prior to the album's release. "Pump Up the Stereo", "Suara Kaki Lima" and "Marabahaya" was later released as further singles. "Marabahaya" were selected as one of the soundtracks for Ahmad Idham's 2007 Malaysian action film, Impak Maksima. Music videos were produced for Freakshow" and "Marabahaya".

== Track listing ==
| No. | Title | Length |
|---|---|---|
| 1. | "All I Got" (featuring Dabo) | 4:04 |
| 2. | "Freakshow" (featuring Dandee of Silksounds) | 3:37 |
| 3. | "All That Glitters" (featuring Big Pooh of Little Brother, Cesar Comanche and L.E.G.A.C.Y.) | 4:33 |
| 4. | "Rockera" (featuring Nitro Y Fanta) | 3:56 |
| 5. | "Reggaeton Asiano" (featuring Roshan of K-Town Clan and Ras Muhamad) | 3:35 |
| 6. | "Pump Up The Stereo" (featuring Joe Flizzow, DJ Cheapshot RMX) | 3:45 |
| 7. | "Block Party" | 3:54 |
| 8. | "Piece of the Pie" (featuring Inspectah Deck of the Wu-Tang Clan) | 4:58 |
| 9. | "Marabahaya" | 4:23 |
| 10. | "Motherland" (featuring Emmett of Butterfingers) | 3:13 |
| 11. | "Anthem Revisited" (featuring Vandal) | 3:13 |
| 12. | "Old Skool Rocka Jam" | 3:18 |
| 13. | "Suara Kaki Lima" (featuring Ahli Fiqir) | 3:50 |
| Total length: | | 47:55 |

== Credits and personnel ==
The credits are adapted from the album's booklet liner notes.

Pop Shuvit

- Moots! - vocals
- JD - guitars, vocals, programming
- AJ - bass, programming
- Rudy - drums
- DJ Uno - turntables, programming

Musicians

- Dabo - vocals (track 1)
- Dandee of Silksounds - vocals (track 2)
- Big Pooh of Little Brother - vocals (track 3)
- Cesar Comanche - vocals (track 3)
- L.E.G.A.C.Y. - vocals (track 3)
- Nitro Y Fanta - vocals (track 4)
- Roshan of K-Town Clan - vocals (track 5)
- Ras Muhamad - vocals (track 5)
- Joe Flizzow - vocals (track 6)
- DJ Cheapshot - DJ scratches (track 6)
- Inspectah Deck of the Wu-Tang Clan - vocals (track 8)
- Emmett of Butterfingers - vocals, guitars (track 10)
- Vandal - vocals (track 11)
- Ahli Fiqir - vocals (track 13)

Production

- Pop Shuvit - producer
- Greg Henderson - engineer, mixer
- Joe Gastwirt - mastering
- Bustamam Mokhtar - photography
- Yaniz Merican - management
- Studio 21:05 - recording studio
- Joe Gastwirt Mastering Joint - mastering studio

== Awards ==
| Award | Year | Recipient(s) and nominee(s) | Category | Result | Ref(s) |
|---|---|---|---|---|---|
| Anugerah Industri Muzik | 2008 | Freakshow Vol. 1: Tales of the Travelling Tunes | Best Local English Album | Nominated | |
| Anugerah Industri Muzik | 2008 | Freakshow Vol. 1: Tales of the Travelling Tunes | Best Album Recording | Nominated | |

== Release history ==
Release history
| Region | Date | Format(s) | Label | Ref. |
|---|---|---|---|---|
| Malaysia | November 15, 2007 | CD; music download; streaming | Shuvit Management, YZ International, Universal Music Malaysia | |
