= Jamir Garcia =

Filipino singer (1978–2020)

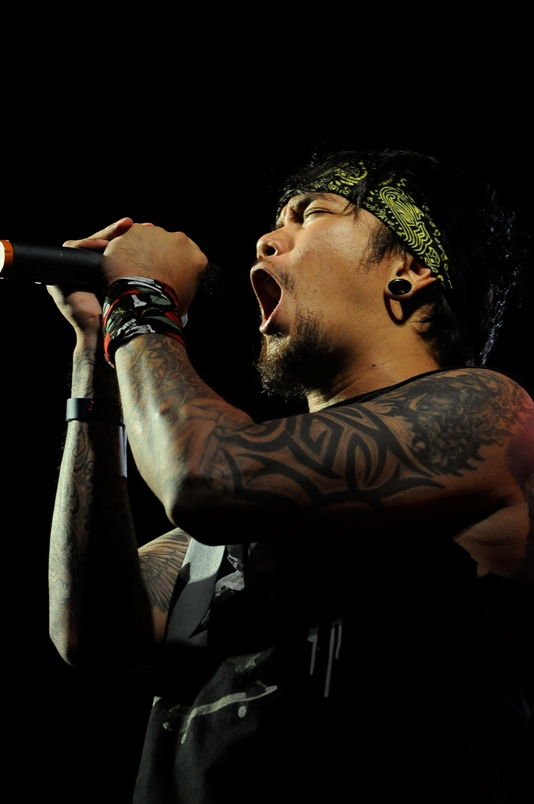
- Garcia performing with Slapshock at the University of the Philippines in 2011.

Background information
- Born: Vladimir Salenga Garcia; September 5, 1978; Pampanga, Philippines
- Died: November 26, 2020 (aged 42) Quezon City, Philippines
- Genres: Alternative metal; nu metal; rap metal; metalcore
- Occupations: Singer; songwriter
- Instrument: Vocals
- Years active: 1997–2020
- Formerly of: Slapshock; Rivermaya; Project E.A.R.; Pop Shuvit; Saint Loco; Ahli Fiqir; Thaitanium; Silksounds

Vladimir "Jamir" Salenga Garcia (5 September 1978 – 26 November 2020) was a Filipino musician best known as the lead vocalist of the nu metal band Slapshock.

== Slapshock ==
The band was formed during the University of the Philippines Fair on 14 February 1997, which was also their first ever gig. By early 1998, original singer Reynold Munsayac had left, and Garcia was brought in to replace him. The band's name came from guitar plucking and chord-slapping techniques that characterized the nu-metal sound. Rap-funk-punk-metal fusion band the Red Hot Chili Peppers was a significant influence. Their album 4th Degree Burn reached platinum status. "We started at a young age, and now we've matured. We evolved on our own. We don't confine ourselves to what is the mode today," Garcia claimed.Kinse Kalibre, their last album under PolyEast Records, was released in 2011. The group produced the album themselves. They received a nomination for Best Artist from MTV Asia, and were awarded Band of the Year by NU 107 in 2001, 2002, and 2003. They also received the Best Album Packaging award for Novena in 2002. Some of their songs are considered hardcore in genre.

Slapshock performed at the Dubai Desert Rock Festival on March 7, 2008, with Korn, Machine Head, Velvet Revolver, Muse, and Marky Ramone of the Ramones. "It was very fulfilling; we saw the bands that we idolize. We were inspired to write new materials. We became a band because of them," said Garcia. Though they sang a Tagalog song, the audience liked their music.

== Other work ==
In 2012, Garcia and apl.de.ap collaborated on the theme song for the movie El Presidente, which won Best Theme Song in the 2012 Metro Manila Film Festival.

In 2018, Garcia collaborated with the hip-hop group Chinese Mafia on the song "Laban" from the official soundtrack of the film We Will Not Die Tonight.

== Social issues ==
Slapshock was vocal about with its stance on issues facing Filipinos. "We get affected because we pay taxes to the government, then they can't even protect us," Garcia said.

== Death and funeral ==
On November 26, 2020, Garcia committed suicide by hanging in Quezon City. He was brought to Metro North Medical Center and Hospital, where he was declared dead.

== Slapshock discography ==
- 4th Degree Burn (PolyEast Records, 1999)
- Headtrip (PolyEast Records, 2001)
- Project 11-41 (PolyEast Records, 2002)
- Novena (PolyEast Records, 2004)
- Silence (PolyEast Records, 2006)
- Cariño Brutal (PolyEast Records, 2009)
- Kinse Kalibre (PolyEast Records, 2011)
- Night Owls (BMBX, 2014)
- Atake (Alley Road Records, 2017)
