= Phantom Frequencies =

Studio album by Pop Shuvit
- Released: September 6, 2024
- Recorded: 2014–2024
- Studios: Studio 21:05 (Taman Tun Dr. Ismail, Kuala Lumpur)
- Genres: Rock, hip hop
- Length: 30:40
- Labels: Shuvit Management, Universal Music Malaysia
- Producer: Pop Shuvit

Pop Shuvit chronology
Cherry Blossom Love Affair (2011)	Phantom Frequencies (2024)

Singles from Phantom Frequencies
- 1. "Space Between Us" Released: 6 October 2023; 2. "Gila Kuasa" Released: 6 August 2024

Phantom Frequencies is the sixth studio album by Malaysian rock band Pop Shuvit, released on 6 September 2024 by their own record label, Shuvit Management. It is their first studio album in 13 years since Cherry Blossom Love Affair (2011), following their reunion in early 2024, marking the longest gap between studio albums in the band's career.

== Production ==
Following the release of their fifth studio album, Cherry Blossom Love Affair, Pop Shuvit announced that they would take a break from releasing any studio albums and went hiatus to focus on respective careers and personal lives. However, they did live performances and release singles during their absence including "Ingat Kau Bagus" (2016) and "Binasa" (2020). In 2024, however, the band announced that they would reunited to release their first studio album in 13 years, which they titled Phantom Frequencies. The album's title was chosen through the use of artificial intelligence (AI).

Band drummer Rudy said the reunion was upon request from their fans, and said: "This is the right time for us to make a comeback. With the messages and requests we've received (from fans), it feels like this is the best time. If we were to follow suit, we wouldn't want to, but because many people have asked us to make a comeback. This is a big commitment, so we finally discussed and agreed to a release new album".

Although Phantom Frequencies is a studio album, it is more like an extended play (EP) as there are eight songs included in the album. They were joined by notable regional and international guest artists, including Noh Salleh (Hujan), Emmett (Butterfingers), Ray Toro (My Chemical Romance), Wing Meng (Love Me Butch), Dandee (Thailand), Yonnyboii, SYA, and Jamir Garcia (Slapshock). In the album, there is a song titled "Awas! (KRUmanic)", which is a remake version of Malaysian boy band KRU's 1994 single of the same name. The album was dedicated in loving memory of Garcia, frontman of Slapshock, who died on 26 November 2020 of committing suicide.

== Release and reception ==
The album was released on 6 September 2024, with a listening party held at Swee Lee, Lot 10 in Kuala Lumpur. Two songs in the album: "Space Between Us" and "Gila Kuasa" was released as main singles.

== Track listing ==
No.	Title	Length
1.	"Melaju"	3:16
2.	"Gila Kuasa" (feat. Noh Salleh)	3:40
3.	"Awas!" (KRUmanic)	3:35
4.	"Marabahaya Underground" (feat. Adam E, Yonnyboii, SYA, FareedPF)	4:39
5.	"Over You" (feat. Emmett I)	2:46
6.	"Believer" (feat. Wing Meng, Dandee, Emmett I, Jamir Garcia, Project E.A.R.)	4:19
7.	"Space Between Us" (feat. Wing Meng, Ray Toro, Dandee, Emmett I)	3:54
8.	"Berbisik" (feat. Jamir Garcia, Emmett I, Dandee)	4:22
Total length:		30:40

== Credits and personnel ==
The credits are adapted from the album's booklet liner notes.

Pop Shuvit

- Moots! - vocals
- JD - guitars, vocals, programming
- AJ - bass, programming
- Rudy - drums
- DJ Uno - turntables, programming

Musicians

- Noh Salleh - vocals (track 2)
- Adam E - vocals (track 4)
- Yonnyboii - vocals (track 4)
- SYA - vocals (track 4)
- FareedPF - vocals (track 4)
- Emmett I - vocals (tracks 5–8)
- Wing Meng - guitars (tracks 6 and 7)
- Dandee - vocals (tracks 6–8)
- Jamir Garcia - vocals (tracks 6 and 8)
- Project E.A.R. - vocals (track 6)
- Ray Toro - guitars, backing vocals (track 7)

Production

- Pop Shuvit - producer
- Greg Henderson - engineer, mixer
- Tom Baker - mastering
- Studio 21:05 - recording studio
- Precision Mastering - mastering studio

== Release history ==
Release history
Region	Date	Format(s)	Label	Ref.
Malaysia	September 6, 2024	CD; music download; streaming	Shuvit Management, Universal Music Malaysia	
