= Amped & Dangerous =

Studio album by Pop Shuvit
- Released: August 23, 2006
- Recorded: 2005–2006
- Studios: Studio 21:05 (Taman Tun Dr. Ismail, Kuala Lumpur)
- Genres: Rock; hip-hop
- Length: 46:34
- Labels: Shuvit Management; EMI Music Malaysia
- Producer: Greg Henderson

Pop Shuvit chronology
Here & Now (2005)	Amped & Dangerous (2006)	All I Got Hip-Hop Collaboration (2006)

Singles from Amped & Dangerous
- 1. "Set You on Fire" Released: 2006; 2. "Lets Sleeping Dogs Lie" Released: 2006; 3. "Pump Up the Stereo" Released: 2006; 4. "Wannabe" Released: 2007

Amped & Dangerous is the third studio album by Malaysian rock band Pop Shuvit, released on 23 August 2006 by their own record label, Shuvit Management and distributed by EMI Music Malaysia. This is the only band's album not released in Malaysia and it is only released in Japan.

== Production ==
Following the success of their second album, Here & Now (2005), which gained critical and commercial success in Japan, Pop Shuvit announced in an interview that they would be released their third album, which scheduled to be released before late August 2006. It become the band's first release under their own record label, Shuvit Management.

The album was recorded primarily at Studio 21:05, owned by the band guitarist JD Wong, in Taman Tun Dr. Ismail, Kuala Lumpur. They were joined by singers and rappers like Japanese rapper, Dabo for "All I Got", with lyrics in English and Japanese. Puerto Rican reggaeton duo, Nitro Y Fanta provided their voices for the song "Rockera", with lyrics in English and Spanish. The band also collaborated with Big Pooh of Little Brother, Cesar Comanche and L.E.G.A.C.Y. for the song "All That Glitters". John HD, vocalist of Malaysian metalcore band, Nervewreck sing choruses on "Set You On Fire". According to the band members, Amped & Dangerous was described as "a rollercoaster ride of crunching guitars", pounding rhythms and funked out hip hop beats and rhymes. Band drummer Rudy said: "This is essentially a guitar driven album that's made for the mosh pit. Simply put, it rocks harder!".

Like their previous albums, the album was produced, engineered and mixed by Greg Henderson and mastered by Tom Baker (who previously mastered their second album, Here & Now) at Precision Mastering in Los Angeles, California, United States. Some of the tracks in the album, including "Rockera" and "All That Glitters", were later included in the band's subsequent album, Freakshow Vol. 1: Tales of the Travelling Tunes (2007).

== Release and reception ==
The album was released exclusively in Japan on 23 August 2006 without a release for Malaysian market. Band guitarist JD said: "We had to think strategically this time around and only release tracks that cater for a specific market so the Japanese/Asian and Malaysian editions will be different". However, the Malaysian version or the album, titled Amped & Dangerous: The Street Edition, was released in December containing eight tracks and comes in a blister pack with trading cards.

Four singles were released from the album, with the first single being "Set You On Fire". Its music video was filmed in Stockholm, Sweden, featuring amateur casts and co-produced by Shuvit Management and Swedish production company, A-Lite Produktion. "Let's Sleeping Dogs Lie", "Pump Up the Stereo" and "Wannabe" was later released as further singles.

== Track listing ==
No.	Title	Length
1.	"Amped" (intro)	2:09
2.	"Dangerous"	5:16
3.	"Set You On Fire" (featuring John HD of Nervewreck)	3:40
4.	"Killing Time"	3:53
5.	"Motown" (Outtake)	0:32
6.	"Wannabe"	3:10
7.	"Pump Up the Stereo"	4:01
8.	"Pump It in the Air?" (Outtake)	0:09
9.	"Collide"	4:11
10.	"Let Sleeping Dogs Lie"	3:01
11.	"Paco" (Outtake)	0:32
12.	"Block Party"	3:54
13.	"Ziggy" (Outtake)	0:13
14.	"Old Skool Rocka" (Spacebar Remix)	5:10
15.	"All I Got" (featuring Dabo)	4:04
16.	"All That Glitters" (featuring Big Pooh of Little Brother, Cesar Comanche, L.E.G.A.C.Y.)	4:33
17.	"Rockera" (featuring Nitro Y Fanta)	3:56
Total length:		46:34

== Credits and personnel ==
The credits are adapted from the album's booklet liner notes.

Pop Shuvit

- Moots! - vocals
- JD - guitars, vocals, programming
- AJ - bass, programming
- Rudy - drums
- DJ Uno - turntables, programming

Musicians

- John HD - vocals (track 3)
- Dabo - vocals (track 15)
- Big Pooh - vocals (track 16)
- Cesar Comanche - vocals (track 16)
- L.E.G.A.C.Y. - vocals (track 16)
- Nitro Y Fanta - vocals (track 17)

Production

- Greg Henderson - producer, engineer, mixer
- Tom Baker - mastering
- Studio 21:05 - recording studio
- Precision Mastering - mastering studio

== Release history ==
Release history
Region	Date	Format(s)	Label	Ref.
Japan	August 23, 2006	CD; cassette; music download; streaming	Shuvit Management, S2S Recordings	
Malaysia	December 2006	CD; cassette; music download; streaming	Shuvit Management, EMI Music Malaysia	
