= Cherry Blossom Love Affair =

Studio album by Pop Shuvit
- Released: July 20, 2011
- Recorded: 2009–2011
- Studios: Studio 21:05 (Taman Tun Dr. Ismail, Kuala Lumpur)
- Genres: Rock, hip hop
- Length: 51:42
- Labels: Shuvit Management, Warner Music Malaysia
- Producer: Pop Shuvit

Pop Shuvit chronology
Freakshow Vol. 1: Tales of the Travelling Tunes (2007)	Cherry Blossom Love Affair (2011)	Phantom Frequencies (2024)

Singles from Cherry Blossom Love Affair
- 1. "Oh! Sizuka" Released: 2009; 2. "Liar Lara" Released: 2010; 3. "Running Away" Released: 2010; 4. "Getting Away With Murder" Released: 2011; 5. "Seperti Syurgamu" Released: 2011; 6. "Nebula 11" Released: 2011

Cherry Blossom Love Affair is the fifth studio album by Malaysian rock band Pop Shuvit, released on 20 July 2011 by their own record label, Shuvit Management. Six singles were released from the album.

== Production ==
Pop Shuvit announced in early 2011 that they will be released their fifth album after topping streaming platforms and radio charts with "Oh! Sizuka", "Liar Lara" and "Getting Away With Murder". The band's guitarist, JD Wong said they wanted to make it as a double album, which divided into two parts, namely Malay and English, while affirmed that "some songs in the album are special songs" in order to diversifying their musical genres.

In the album, they were joined by singers and musicians whom the band collaborated on seven songs. Dina Nadzir appeared in two songs – "Getting Away With Murder" and a cover version of P. Ramlee's "Aci Aci Buka Pintu". Project E.A.R., a collective which Pop Shuvit is one of the founding members, appeared in two songs – "Hold On (This Is The Only Way)" and a remake version of "Marabahaya". Other collaborators including Dandee and Big Bear from Thai hip-hop group Silksounds for "Story of a (Lonely Girl)" and Japanese magician Cyril Takayama for "Magic Man". The band choose Man Bai as their duet partner for "Seperti Syurgamu". Band drummer, Rudy said they choose him for his "vast experience". Although Man Bai was surprised to be asked and was under contract with a different record label, he accepted the offer to record the track in a period of a day.

The album title, which reads ‘CHERRY BLOSSOM LOVE AFFAIR’ in capital letters, in which the words "Cherry" and "Love Affair" in white color, while the word "Blossom" in red color. The album title was present in the cover, however, the Pop Shuvit name was not present.

== Release and reception ==
Originally scheduled for release in March 2011, the album was officially released on 20 July 2011. It was preceded by its first single, "Oh! Sizuka", which was released almost two years before the album. "Liar Lara" was released as the second single in 2010. The song's title was decided through a vote. "Running Away", "Getting Away With Murder" and "Nebula 11" was later released as further singles.

This was their last studio album before unofficially entered a hiatus, during which band members focused on family and work commitments and would not record another album until 2024's Phantom Frequencies.

== Track listing ==
No.	Title	Length
1.	"Nebula 11"	4:34
2.	"Running Away"	3:41
3.	"Mimpi Terakhir Dunia"	4:14
4.	"Getting Away With Murder" (feat. Dina Nadzir)	4:06
5.	"Oh! Sizuka"	4:28
6.	"Seperti Syurgamu" (feat. Man Bai)	4:30
7.	"Liar Lara"	3:55
8.	"Story of a (Lonely Girl)" (feat. Dandee and Big Bear)	4:07
9.	"Aci Aci Buka Pintu" (P. Ramlee tribute, feat. Dina Nadzir)	4:49
10.	"Magic Man" (feat. Cyril Takayama)	3:57
11.	"Hold On (This Is The Only Way)" (feat. Project E.A.R.)	4:22
12.	"Marabahaya" (feat. Project E.A.R.)	5:04
Total length:		49:47

== Credits and personnel ==
The credits are adapted from the album's booklet liner notes.

Pop Shuvit

- Moots! - vocals
- JD - guitars, vocals, programming
- AJ - bass, programming
- Rudy - drums
- DJ Uno - turntables, programming

Musicians

- Dina Nadzir - vocals (tracks 4 and 9)
- Man Bai - vocals (track 6)
- Dandee of Silksounds - vocals (track 8)
- Big Bear - vocals (track 8)
- Cyril Takayama - vocals (track 10)
- Project E.A.R. - vocals (tracks 11 and 12)

Production

- Pop Shuvit - producer
- Greg Henderson - engineer, mixer
- Tom Baker - mastering
- Studio 21:05 - recording studio
- Precision Mastering - mastering studio

== Release history ==
Release history
Region	Date	Format(s)	Label	Ref.
Malaysia	July 20, 2011	CD; music download; streaming	Shuvit Management, Warner Music Malaysia	
