= Novena (disambiguation) =

A novena is a nine-day devotional worship in Christianity.

Novena may also refer to:

- Novena, Singapore, a planning area
  - Novena MRT station
- Novena University, in Ogume, Delta State, Nigeria
- Novena (computing platform), an open-source computing hardware project
- Novena (album), by Slapshock, 2004
- The Novena, a 2005 Canadian film
