= Rap Untuk Rakyat =

Studio album by Ahli Fiqir
- Released: 19 June 2007
- Recorded: 2006 – 2007
- Studio: Haze World Studios; Platinum Studios
- Genre: Hip-hop; rap
- Length: 50:00
- Label: Powder Records; Warner Music Singapore
- Producer: SK Cheah

Ahli Fiqir chronology
Hari Ini Dalam Sejarah (2005)	Rap Untuk Rakyat (2007)	Irama Berima (2009)

Singles from Rap Untuk Rakyat
- 1. "2x5" Released: 2007; 2. "Dia Datang" Released: 2008

Rap Untuk Rakyat (Rap for the Masses) is the second and final studio album by Singaporean hip-hop group, Ahli Fiqir, released on 19 June 2007 by Powder Records and Warner Music Singapore. Two singles were released from the album.

== Production ==
Following the massive success of their debut album Hari Ini Dalam Sejarah (2005), Ahli Fiqir began working on a material for Rap Untuk Rakyat in late 2006. Songwriting was handled by the group, Syaheed, Illegal and D'Navigator as well as AJ and DJ Uno from rap rock band Pop Shuvit, with Tukang Kata writes majority of the lyrics. The album was produced by SK Cheah who also serves as executive producer. Rap Untuk Rakyat would be the last album Ahli Fiqir recorded and released as a quartet prior to the departure of its founding member, Tukang Kata, a year later.

== Release and reception ==
The album was released on 19 June 2007, with "2x5" and "Dia Datang" were released as singles. Music video for the album's first single, "2x5" were also produced.

== Track listing ==
All tracks are written by Ahli Fiqir except where noted.

No.	Title	Writer(s)	Arranged by	Length
1.	"Rap Untuk Rakyat" (Intro)	DJ Cza		0:40
2.	"Selamat Datang Ke Industri Muzik"	Daly; Tukang Kata	Syaheed	4:00
3.	"Kawan"	DJ Uno, Tukang Kata		4:01
4.	"2x5"	Illegal; Tukang Kata	Illegal	4:19
5.	"Beruk"	Daly; Tukang Kata	D'Navigator	3:56
6.	"Indung"	AJ; DJ Uno; Mawar Berduri; Tukang Kata		3:44
7.	"Ikut Rentak"	Illegal; Tukang Kata	Illegal	4:16
8.	"Langkah Laksamana"	Mawar Berduri; DJ Uno; Tukang Kata	Illegal	4:56
9.	"Dia Datang"	DJ Uno; Tukang Kata		4:16
10.	"Kelentong"	DJ Uno; Tukang Kata		3:30
11.	"Tiada Yang Kekal"	AJ; Tukang Kata		4:03
Total length:				50:00

== Release history ==
Region	Date	Format	Label
Singapore	19 June 2007	CD, cassette, digital download	Powder Records, Warner Music Singapore
