= Take It & Shuvit =

Studio album by Pop Shuvit
- Released: November 5, 2002 (Malaysia); September 2003 (United States); December 20, 2003 (Japan)
- Recorded: 2001–2002
- Studios: Synchrosound Studios; Craze Studios
- Genres: Rock; hip hop
- Length: 44:25
- Labels: Positive Tone; EMI Music Malaysia
- Producer: Greg Henderson

Pop Shuvit chronology
Take It & Shuvit (2002)	The Shuvit Remixes (2004)

Singles from Take It & Shuvit
- 1. "Jump" Released: 2002; 2. "Slip Away" Released: 2002; 3. "Skaters' Anthem" Released: 2003; 4. "Conversations" Released: 2003

Japanese version cover
- Japanese version cover

Take It & Shuvit is the debut studio album by Malaysian rock band Pop Shuvit, released on 5 November 2002 by Positive Tone and EMI Music Malaysia. The album was poorly received, with the band reflected that they received criticism owing to the album's negative response upon its release. A repackaged version of the album, Take It & Shuvit Again was released on December 20, 2003, simultaneously with its Japanese version.

== Production ==
Take It & Shuvit is the first album released by the band. The album was recorded primarily at Synchrosound Studios in Petaling Jaya, Selangor, except a cover version of Kris Kross' 1992 single "Jump", which was recorded at Craze Studios, also operated in Petaling Jaya. It consisted of 15 tracks, including 4 outtakes. The band were joined by two guest artistes – Emmett from Butterfingers sang chorus and bridge for "Kaleidoscope" and Amylene@Shorti sang chorus and bridge for "Conversations". Jamie Wilson plays acoustic guitar for "Kaleidoscope".

The album also became Pop Shuvit's only studio album to feature Point Blanc as the second lead vocalist, before leave the band to focus to his group, Poetic Ammo and later pursue his solo career. The album also marks Pop Shuvit's first collaboration with international acts. Slapshock, a Filipino rock band, featured in the song "Dog Eat Dog (Pinoy Metal Assault)". The album was produced and mixed by Greg Henderson, and mastered by CL Toh at Mastering One.

== Artwork ==
The cover design of the album showing a girl peeing on a drain on front cover, and a same girl pouring carbonated drink on a drain on back cover. According to the band: "We use a friend and filmed her as if she is peeing on a drain. But it was actually, we only poured water". In the booklet there are also images of band members posing outside an abandoned premises.

== Release and reception ==
The album was released in the band's native Malaysia on 5 November 2002 and was poorly received with its sales were lackluster. It also received negative reception upon its release. Prior to its official release, Pop Shuvit was banned by certain radio stations, including Radio Televisyen Malaysia (RTM), due to their sound was deemed "too loud". The album was released in the United States in September 2003, retaining original Malaysian album cover and in Japan on 20 December 2003. For the Japanese version, it has a different album cover.

Four singles were released from the album, with the first single being "Jump", followed by the second single "Slip Away". The album's third single, "Skaters' Anthem" was chosen as the theme song of the Summer X-Games and became one of the most downloaded local songs in Malaysian music history. "Conversations" was the fourth and last single for the album. Music videos were produced for the latter three.

The album also earned Pop Shuvit two nominations at the tenth edition of Anugerah Industri Muzik, namely Best New Local English Artiste and Best Local English Album. A repackaged version, Take It & Shuvit Again was released 20 December 2003 simultaneously with the Japanese version of Take It & Shuvit. It contains music videos for "Skaters Anthem" and "Slip Away", as well as a Malay version of the latter, titled "Masih Ada Cahaya", featuring Ramli Sarip and excluded music video of "Conversations".

== Track listing ==
All tracks are written by Pop Shuvit except where noted.

No.	Title	Writer(s)	Length
1.	"Pop Shuvit"		3:22
2.	"Slip Away"		3:58
3.	"Face Off"		4:32
4.	"Shout Outz" (outtakes)		0:06
5.	"Wrong"		4:30
6.	"Cut the Crap" (outtakes)		0:07
7.	"Jump" (Kris Kross cover)	Jermaine Dupri	4:22
8.	"Kaleidoscope" (feat. Emmett of Butterfingers)	Rudy, AJ, JD, Emmett	4:38
9.	"Dog Eat Dog World"		3:33
10.	"Cruisin'" (outtakes)		0:04
11.	"Skaters' Anthem"		3:41
12.	"Trip Wire"		3:15
13.	"Mo' Shout Outz" (outtakes)		0:04
14.	"Conversations" (feat. Amylene @ Shorti)	Uno, Rudy, AJ, JD, Amylene	3:52
15.	"Dog Eat Dog (Pinoy Metal Assault)" (feat. Slapshock)	Uno, Rudy, AJ, JD, Moots!, Jamir Garcia, Lean Ansing, Jerry Basco, Lee Nadela, Chi Evora	3:15
Total length:			44:25

Take it & Shuvit Again: Repackaged version
No.	Title	Length
1.	"Skaters' Anthem" (music video)	3:41
2.	"Slip Away" (music video)	4:07
3.	"Slip Away (Masih Ada Cahaya)" (music video, feat. Ramli Sarip)	4:07
4.	"The Space in Between" (format data, not playable)	0:58
5.	"Slip Away (Masih Ada Cahaya)" (feat. Ramli Sarip)	3:56

== Credits and personnel ==
The credits are adapted from the album's booklet liner notes.

Pop Shuvit

- Point - vocals
- Moots! - vocals
- JD - guitars
- AJ - bass
- Rudy - drums
- DJ Uno - turntables

Musicians

- Yogi B – vocal (track 7)
- Emmett of Butterfingers – vocal (track 8)
- Amylene@Shorti – vocal (track 14)
- Slapshock – vocal (track 15)
- Ramli Sarip – vocal (track 16, bonus track)
- Jamie Wilson – acoustic guitar (track 8)

Production

- Greg Henderson – producer, mixer
- CL Toh – mastering
- Synchrosound Studios – recording studio
- Craze Studios – recording studio
- Mastering One – mastering studio

== Awards ==
Award	Year	Recipient(s) and nominee(s)	Category	Result	Ref(s)
Anugerah Industri Muzik	2003	Take It & Shuvit	Best Local English Album	Nominated	

== Release history ==
Release history
Region	Date	Format(s)	Label	Ref.
Malaysia	November 5, 2002	CD; cassette; music download; streaming	Positive Tone, EMI Music Malaysia	
United States	September 2003	CD; music download; streaming	EMI	
Japan	December 20, 2003	CD; music download; streaming	S2S Recordings	
