= Hari Ini Dalam Sejarah =

Studio album by Ahli Fiqir
- Released: May 2005
- Recorded: 2003 – 2005
- Studios: Haze World Studios; Platinum Studios; Music Zone
- Genres: Hip-hop; rap
- Length: 68:20
- Labels: Powder Records; Warner Music Singapore
- Producer: Qumran

Ahli Fiqir chronology
Hari Ini Dalam Sejarah (2005)	Rap Untuk Rakyat (2007)

Singles from Hari Ini Dalam Sejarah
- 1. "Samseng" Released: 2004; 2. "Angguk-Angguk, Geleng-Geleng" Released: 2005; 3. "Tik Tok Simpati" Released: 2005

Hari Ini Dalam Sejarah (Today in History) is the debut studio album by Singaporean hip-hop group, Ahli Fiqir, released in May 2005 by Powder Records and Warner Music Singapore. The album was a huge commercial success and three singles were released.

== Background and production ==
Ahli Fiqir was established in 2002 with three original members—Daly, Tukang Kata, and Mawar Berduri. They did not record their own material until DJ Cza joined, completing the group as a quartet. They later signed a record deal with Warner Music Singapore.

The album was recorded primarily in Haze World Studios and Platinum Studios in Kuala Lumpur and in Music Zone in Singapore. For the album, Ahli Fiqir incorporates gurindam, syair and pantun, while preserving the Malay language. Its lyrical themes centered on social commentaries and life realities.

DJ Cza provides scratches for most of the tracks while DJ Mel provided piano sounds for "Ambila Ambillah" and Kelana Purba contributed Dikir Barat for "Dikir Rap". The album was produced by Qumran with Altimet and Illegal serves as co-producer, while the mastering process was done by C.L. Toh at the Mastering One.

== Release and reception ==
The album was released in May 2005, with "Samseng" being released as the album's first single. Three music videos were made for the album, for the songs "Samseng", " Angguk-Angguk, Geleng-Geleng" and "Tik Tok Simpati".

The album was well-received and selling 16,000 copies, leading Ahli Fiqir to won Best Singaporean Artist and Best Singaporean Album at the 2006 Anugerah Planet Muzik. A Malaysian special edition of the album was released in 2006, with some of the tracks were excluded and containing only one new song, "Cak Pong" and a video CD contains the music video for "Angguk-Angguk, Geleng-Geleng" and "Tik Tok Simpati".

== Track listing ==
All tracks are written by Ahli Fiqir except where noted.

Singapore edition
No.	Title	Writer(s)	Arranged by	Length
1.	"Inilah Barisan Kita"		Qumran	3:46
2.	"Angguk-Angguk, Geleng-Geleng" (feat. Mia G-Femininz)		Qumran; Syaheed	3:41
3.	"Tik Tok Simpati"	Mawar Berduri; Tukang Kata	D'Navigator	4:15
4.	"Kalau Melayu... Memang Melayu"		Damian Shortysoul	3:27
5.	"Ambila Ambillah"	Qumran; Tukang Kata	Altimet^{[a]}	4:15
6.	"Hari Ini Dalam Sejarah" (Interlude)	DJ Cza; Mawar Berduri; Qumran; Tukang Kata		0:57
7.	"Narapidana"		Qumran	4:49
8.	"Ahli Fiqir Boleh"	Mawar Berduri; Tukang Kata	Jit W. Lim; Qumran	4:31
9.	"Palsu"	Mawar Berduri	Fiquetional	3:43
10.	"Topeng Wajah"	Mawar Berduri; Tukang Kata	Illegal^{[a]}	4:13
11.	"Ahli Fiqir dan 7 Penyamun"		Qumran; Syaheed	3:59
12.	"Merdeka Minda"		Qumran	4:10
13.	"Samseng"		D'Navigator	4:27
14.	"Kembalikan Kampung Halamanku"		Fiquetional	3:40
15.	"Syair Si Ahli Fiqir"		Koko DMV; Qumran	3:28
16.	"Pesta"	R. Azman; Tukang Kata	Qumran	4:49
17.	"Dikir Rap" (feat. Kelana Purba)	R. Azman; Tukang Kata	Qumran	4:40
Total length:				68:20

Malaysian special edition
No.	Title	Length
18.	"Cak Pong"	4:45

Video CD
No.	Title	Length
19.	"Angguk-Angguk, Geleng-Geleng"	3:51
20.	"Tik Tok Simpati"	4:15

Notes

- ^{^a} signifies a co-producer

== Certifications ==
Country	Certification	Sales/Shipments
Singapore	Sold out	16,000

== Release history ==
Region	Date	Format	Label
Singapore	May 2005	CD, cassette	Powder Records, Warner Music Singapore
Malaysia^{Malaysian Special Edition}	April 2006	CD, cassette	Powder Records, Warner Music Malaysia

== Awards and nominations ==
Year	Awards	Category	Recipient/Nominated work(s)	Result
2006	2006 Anugerah Planet Muzik	Best Singaporean Album	Hari ini Dalam Sejarah	Won
2006	13th Anugerah Industri Muzik	Best Music Video	"Angguk-Angguk, Geleng-Geleng"	Nominated
