= Kinse Kalibre =

Studio album by Slapshock
- Released: December 7, 2011
- Recorded: 2010–2011
- Studio: Shock Sounds Recording Studio
- Genre: Alternative metal; metalcore
- Length: 50:55
- Label: PolyEast Records
- Producer: Slapshock

Slapshock chronology
Cariño Brutal (2009)	Kinse Kalibre (2011)	Night Owls (2014)

Singles from Kinse Kalibre
- 1. "Ngayon Na" Released: November 22, 2011; 2. "Langit" Released: July 8, 2012; 3. "Salamin" Released: June 24, 2013

Kinse Kalibre is the sixth studio album by Filipino heavy metal band Slapshock. It is the first album they released without Rhythm Guitarist and Backing Vocalist, Jerry Basco, as he left the band on 2009, It was released in 2011.

== Track listing ==
All lyrics are written by Jamir Garcia; all music is composed by Slapshock

No.	Title	Length
1.	"Kinse Kalibre Intro"	1:57
2.	"Ngayon Na"	4:35
3.	"Reset"	4:10
4.	"Deliryo"	3:53
5.	"Asal Demonyo"	4:25
6.	"Burn in Hell"	4:21
7.	"In the Line of Fire"	3:49
8.	"Langit"	4:54
9.	"Under the Needle"	4:13
10.	"Heartless"	5:36
11.	"Salamin"	4:45
12.	"All Hope Is Gone"	4:12
Total length:		50:55

== Personnel ==
- Jamir Garcia – vocals
- Chi Evora – drums
- Lee Nadela - bass
- Leandro Ansing - guitar

Additional Musician:

- Lourd De Veyra - Spoken Words (track 1)
- Guartered, Light of Luna & Even - chants (track 7)
- Dyanne Lucionne - Guest Vocals (track 10)

== Production ==
- Recorded and engineered by Lean Ansing
- Mixed by JD Wong at Twenty One O Five Productions
- Mastered by John Greenham at Area 51 Mastering, San Francisco California
- Photography by Xander Angeles of Edge of Light Studios
- Art direction, layout, and graphic design by Team Manila & Graphic Design Studio
