= Wooden Nickels =

Studio album by Cesar Comanche
- Released: 2000
- Recorded: 1998–1999
- Genre: Hip hop
- Length: 65:13
- Label: Defenders of the Free World
- Producer: 9th Wonder; Big Dho; Yorel

Cesar Comanche chronology
Wooden Nickels (2000)	Paper Gods (2002)

Wooden Nickels is the debut studio album by American rapper Cesar Comanche. The album was released through its own label, Defenders of the Free World, in 2000. The album was re-released in 2006, titled Wooden Nickels Revisited with 3 additional tracks. The production comes from then-unknown 9th Wonder, Big Dho and Yorel.

== Track listing ==
No.	Title	Length
1.	"Wjlr Intro" (feat. Big Dho)	1:51
2.	"The Beginning"	3:47
3.	"J-Vilyrical" (feat. Edgar Allen Floe)	5:24
4.	"Villianry" (feat. Von Lee)	0:58
5.	"Ode To Love"	4:13
6.	"Wjlr Interlude" (feat. Big Dho)	0:54
7.	"Postponed"	4:08
8.	"Strange'" (feat. 9th Wonder & Big Dho)	3:31
9.	"Trust"	3:48
10.	"No Respect" (feat. Edgar Allen Floe)	3:12
11.	"Headache"	4:31
12.	"Amnesia"	4:49
13.	"Wjlr Outro"	1:50
