= Here & Now (Pop Shuvit album) =

Studio album by Pop Shuvit
- Released: February 6, 2005
- Recorded: August – December 2004
- Studios: Studio 21:05 (Taman Tun Dr. Ismail, Kuala Lumpur); Synchrosound Studios (Petaling Jaya, Selangor)
- Genres: Rock; hip hop
- Length: 38:06
- Label: EMI Music Malaysia
- Producer: Greg Henderson

Pop Shuvit chronology
The Shuvit Remixes (2004)	Here & Now (2005)	Amped & Dangerous (2006)

Singles from Here & Now
- 1. "Old Skool Rocka" Released: 2005; 2. "Journey" Released: 2005; 3. "Without a Cause" Released: 2005

Here & Now (stylized as HERE&NOW) is the second studio album by Malaysian rock band Pop Shuvit, released on 6 February 2005 by EMI Music Malaysia. The album had commercial success in Japan.

== Production ==
Almost two years after the release of their debut album, Take It & Shuvit (2002), which gained commercial failure and lackluster sales, and following their successful debut in Japan, Pop Shuvit announced in September 2004 that they began working on a material for their second album, scheduled for release in late 2004 and early 2005, with Greg Henderson returned as the album's producer. However, before the album's recording process, one of the two lead vocalist of the band, Point Blanc, decided to leave the band and return to Poetic Ammo before going embark on his solo career, leaving Pop Shuvit as a quintet with Moots! as the only lead vocalist. On the album, the band were joined by American hip-hop group, Zion I, who contributed rap for "I Got tha' Flow"; Canadian rapper, Vandal for "Journey", also features Zain Hamid, a member of Malaysian boy band, Ruffedge. Wei Li of Vespertine plays violin for "Journey".

Recording process was done at two different studios – Studio 21:05 in Taman Tun Dr. Ismail, Kuala Lumpur and Synchrosound Studios in Petaling Jaya, Selangor, in the period of 4 months. Line 6 Amplifiers, Yamaha drums, Fender Basses and Vestax Turntables & Mixers were used in the album's recording, as well as Line 6 Bass Pod and Pioneer CDJs. The album was produced by Henderson, who produced their first album and also served as the engineer, and co-produced by the band's guitarist, JD Wong. The mastering process was done by Tom Baker at Precision Mastering in Los Angeles, California, United States. The cover art photography was taken by Malaysian photographer, Bustamam Mokhtar, features band members in an anime character. The album is dedicated to the victims of the 2004 Indian Ocean earthquake and tsunami, with an eulogy reads:

"In this day and age. We are victims of our own rage. In the pursuit of power and money in the name of God and Country. We have disregarded ourselves and this great land that we live free. Today, You have taught us a great lesson... a lesson in humility. Today, let us celebrate life... let us live life to its fullest... Here & Now".

The eulogy was written on 26 December 2004, which is the day the tragedy took place and the last day of the album's recording.

== Release and reception ==
The album was released on 6 February 2005 in Japan with Tower Records become distributor for the album's Japanese edition. It was later released on 1 April 2005 in the band's native Malaysia.

The first single to be released from the album was "Old Skool Rocka" with a music video featuring footage of the band's Japan tour. "Without a Cause" and "Journey" were released as further singles. It also received critical praise upon its release.

== Track listing ==
All tracks are written by Pop Shuvit.

No.	Title	Length
1.	"Here & Now"	2:55
2.	"Side Swipe"	3:49
3.	"Old Skool Rocka"	2:39
4.	"I Got Tha’ Flow" (feat. Zion)	3:58
5.	"Do You Wanna Rock"	1:00
6.	"Without a Cause"	3:30
7.	"Ego Trip"	3:21
8.	"Unknown Agendas"	1:44
9.	"Put 'Em Up"	3:52
10.	"Back 2 My Roots"	3:29
11.	"Journey" (feat. Vandal and Zain Ruffedge)	4:08
12.	"L.I.E.S"	3:38
Total length:		38:06

== Credits and personnel ==
The credits are adapted from the album's booklet liner notes.

Pop Shuvit

- Moots! - vocals
- JD - guitars, vocals, programming
- AJ - bass
- Rudy - drums
- DJ Uno - turntables, programming

Musicians

- Zion I - guest vocals (track 4)
- Vandal - guest rap (track 11)
- Zain Ruffedge - guuest vocals (track 11)
- Wei Li - violin (track 11; uncredited)

Production

- Greg Henderson - producer, engineer, mixer
- Tom Baker - mastering
- Bustamam Mokhtar - photography
- Uetake MacArthur - artwork design
- Jennifer Chia - A&R management
- Fauziah J. - makeup
- Kevin - hairstylist
- Studio 21:05 - recording studio
- Synchrosound Studios - recording studio
- Precision Mastering - mastering studio

== Awards ==
Award	Year	Recipient(s) and nominee(s)	Category	Result	Ref(s)
Anugerah Industri Muzik	2006	Here & Now	Best Local English Album	Nominated	

== Release history ==
Release history
Region	Date	Format(s)	Label	Ref.
Japan	February 6, 2005	CD; cassette; music download; streaming	S2S Recordings	
Malaysia	April 1, 2005	CD; cassette; music download; streaming	EMI Music Malaysia	
