= Night Owls (EP) =

EP by Slapshock
- Released: April 26, 2014
- Recorded: 2013 at Los Angeles, California, U.S.
- Genre: Heavy metal • metalcore
- Length: 18:34
- Label: BMBX
- Producer: apl.de.ap

Slapshock chronology
Kinse Kalibre (2011)	Night Owls (2014)	Atake (2017)

Singles from Night Owls
- 1. "Night Owls" Released: April 7, 2014; 2. "The Crown (Featuring Apl. De Ap)" Released: March 30, 2015; 3. "Turn Back Time" Released: June 2, 2015

Night Owls is the second EP by Filipino heavy metal band Slapshock. It is the first EP by the band to feature Rhythm Guitarist Jerry Basco as he rejoined the band in 2013. It was released on April 26, 2014, by apl.de.ap's label BMBX Entertainment. The album's carrier single "Night Owls" was released on April 7, 2014. The second single "The Crown" featuring Apl. De Ap was released on 2015.

== Track listing ==
All tracks are written by Jamir Garcia, Music by Slapshock, except where noted.

No.	Title	Writer(s)	Length
1.	"Introduction"		0:28
2.	"Dangerous"		3:15
3.	"Night Owls"		3:44
4.	"Turn Back Time"		4:03
5.	"The Crown"	Lyrics by Jamir Garcia, Apl. De Ap, Edgar Sinio, Music by Slapshock, Shavo Odadjian	3:04
6.	"Coma"		4:00
Total length:			18:34

== Personnel ==
- Vladimir Garcia – lead vocals
- Lee Nadela - bass
- Leandro Ansing - lead guitar
- Jerry Basco - rhythm guitar
- Richard Evora – drums

Additional musicians:

- Shavo Odadjian - additional guitar (track 5)
- Roem Baur - additional vocals (track 6)

== Production ==
- All tracks co-produced by Slapshock
- Executive Producers: Apl. de ap, David Kostiner, Audie Vergara, Lean Ansing
- Recorded in Los Angeles and San Francisco, California
- Mixing Engineers: Ben Grosse, Terry Date
- Mastered in Los Angeles by John Greenham
- Production: Damian Page Lewis and Edgar Sinio, Shavo Odadjian (track 5)
- Additional production (track 5): Damian Page Lewis and Edgar Sinio
- Vocal production: Todd Herfindel
- Engineered by Damian Page Lewis and Edgar Sinio
- Album cover design by Pj Cabasal
