= Irama Berima =

EP by Ahli Fiqir
- Released: 20 August 2009
- Recorded: 2009
- Genres: Hip-hop; rap
- Length: 21:41
- Labels: Powder Records; Warner Music Singapore
- Producer: SK Cheah

Ahli Fiqir chronology
Rap Untuk Rakyat (2007)	Irama Berima (2009)	Fiqir Fiqir (2009)

Singles from Irama Berima
- 1. "Fiqir Fiqir" Released: 2009; 2. "Derita Merindu" Released: 2009

Irama Berima (Rhyming Rhythm) is the debut and only extended play (EP) by Singaporean hip-hop group, Ahli Fiqir, released on 20 August 2009 by Powder Records and Warner Music Singapore.

== Production ==
Irama Berima was recorded by Ahli Fiqir during early 2009 and would be their first release as a trio following the departure of their founding member, Tukang Kata, who left in late 2008 due to family and work commitments. In the EP, there's a song called "Jangan Pergi Mawar", which specially dedicated to one of the group's member, Mawar Berduri. They also collaborated with singer-songwriter Yasin Sulaiman for the song, entitled "Fantasi". It also would be the group's very last official recording prior to their disbandment in April 2010.

== Release and reception ==
The EP was released on 20 August 2009 to popular success. Two singles were released for the EP – "Fiqir Fiqir" and "Derita Merindu". Irama Berima was one of two EPs released by Ahli Fiqir in 2009, the other being Fiqir Fiqir.

== Track listing ==
All tracks are written by Ahli Fiqir.

No.	Title	Length
1.	"Fiqir Fiqir"	3:39
2.	"Biarkan"	4:27
3.	"Derita Merindu"	4:34
4.	"Janganlah Pergi Mawar"	3:37
5.	"Fantasi" (feat. Yasin)	4:36
Total length:		21:41
