= Singapore hip-hop =

Music genre in Singapore

Singapore hip hop is a collective of hip hop music, graffiti arts, deejaying/turntablism, break dancing and beatboxing, which are performed by hip hop enthusiasts who are of Singapore-born mainly from the four main ethnic categories or "races": the Chinese, Malays, Indians and Eurasians. This movement began in the mid-1980s, influenced significantly by Singapore's role as an international port that facilitated cultural exchanges, notably with the United States where hip hop originated.

Hip hop in Singapore is multilingual, with artists performing mainly in English as well as in Chinese, Malay and Tamil. Malay-language hip hop is particularly prominent and has developed a subculture with a fan base extending across Southeast Asia. One notable example is the group Ahli Fiqir, which also achieved popularity in Malaysia and Indonesia.

== History ==
Singlish surfaced from the earliest hip-hop music liberation of Singapore from a nonexistent band called "Kopi Kat Klan".

In the 1990s, rap duo Construction Sight, consisting of Sheikh Heikel and Ashidiq Ghazali, after winning Asia Bagus Grand Championship, a talent show, was credited as "Singapore's first ever rap group". After winning the Grand Championship, they released a few rap albums. Sheikh was considered the god-father of the Singapore's rap scene.

In Canada, Masiah One of Merdek’s music is cited as the most successful Singapore-born, female rapper in the island’s music industry.

In 2011, there was a year, graffiti got the most brilliance, as AsNo Doink and Clogtwo represented in Taiwan and took the 2nd Asian Wall-Lords finals for Singapore, which was the highest honour any artist graffiti have achieved in Singapore. And in 2014, Asno Doink represented Singapore & Asia in a meeting of the Styles of the World to meet in Wisbeden Germany as part of the Made from Skratch Eurotour. He was awarded the "Best Text Writer" Award for his Javi inspired text. He together Made from Skratch, and his crew #ProjectBurnerz, collaborate with the *scape on a graffiti wall mural in August 2014, so that they would leave a mark on the most prominent wall in Singapore. Negotiations of another mural was planned in 2020.

In 2012, 2 beatboxers represented Singapore at the Beatbox Battle World Championship held in Berlin. They were Zul Mystroe (showcase category) and Dharni (battle category). Dharni, which earlier in 2009, was placed 4th in the Beatbox Battle World Championship and has been crowned World Champion in 2015

== See also ==
- Malaysian hip-hop
- Indonesian hip-hop
