= The Shuvit Remixes =

Remix album by Pop Shuvit
- Released: 2004 (Japan)
- Genres: Rock, hip hop, electronic
- Length: 47:25
- Labels: Positive Tone, EMI

Pop Shuvit chronology
Take It & Shuvit (2002)	The Shuvit Remixes (2004)	Here & Now (2005)

Professional ratings
Review scores
Source	Rating
Amazon.com	4/5 stars
Discogs	4/5 stars

The Shuvit Remixes is a remix album released by Malaysian rock group Pop Shuvit. The album was released in 2004 and is available only in Japan. It consists of eight tracks, including six remixes and two new recordings. Two new songs—"Here & Now" and "Without a Cause"—were later included in their second album, Here & Now (2005).

== Track listing ==
1. "Here & Now" (2:59)
2. "Without A Cause" (3:33)
3. "Skaters' Anthem" (TDR Remix) (6:14)
4. "Conversations" (Shiloh Remix) (9:57)
5. "Conversations" (DJ19 Remix) (8:11)
6. "Skaters Anthem" (Kook Mix) (Mold Remix) (6:24)
7. "Skaters' Anthem" (Hip Hop Middle Earth Mix) (4:16)
8. "Jump" (Live At Rock The World IV) (5:57)

== Credits ==
Lyrics by

- Amylene@Shorti (tracks: 4, 5)
- JD (6) (tracks: 3, 6)
- Jimbo (9) (tracks: 7)
- Moots (tracks: 1 to 7)
- Phlowtron (tracks: 7)
- Point (4) (tracks: 3 to 6)
- Rudy (10) (tracks: 2, 4, 5)

Music by

- AJ (6) (tracks: 1 to 7)
- Amylene@Shorti (tracks: 4, 5)
- DJ UNO (2) (tracks: 1, 2, 4, 5, 7)
- JD (6) (tracks: 1 to 7)
- Jimbo (9) (tracks: 7)
- Moots (tracks: 7)
- Point (4) (tracks: 3, 6)
- Rudy (10) (tracks: 1 to 7)
