= Ahli Fiqir =

Singaporean hip-hop group

- Origin: Singapore
- Genres: Hip hop; rap
- Years active: 2002–2010, 2012
- Labels: Powder Records; Warner Music Malaysia
- Past members: Samsolnahar Sibengat (Tukang Kata); Fadali Mohd Darif (Daly Filsuf); Noor Hidayati Mohamed Yusop (Mawar Berduri); Ceza Mutyara (DJ Cza)

Ahli Fiqir (hyperforeignism of Malay ahli fikir "Philosophers") was a Singaporean hip hop group consisting of Samsolnahar Sibengat (Tukang Kata), Fadali Mohd Darif (Daly Filsuf), Noor Hidayati Mohamed Yusop (Mawar Berduri) and Ceza Mutyara (DJ Cza).

The group, whose career spanned 8 years and widely known in Singapore and Malaysia, known for integrating elements of Malay literature into their music, and has several hit singles including "Samseng", "Angguk-Angguk, Geleng-Geleng", "Tik Tok Simpati", "2x5", "Dia Datang" and "Derita Merindu". They disbanded in 2010.

== History ==
Ahli Fiqir established in 2002 initially consisting of 3 original members - Fadali Mohd Darif (Daly Ahlifiqir; later known as Daly Filsuf), Samsolnahar Sibengat (Tukang Kata) and Noor Hidayati Mohamed Yusop (Mawar Berduri). The group itself was named after one of its members, Daly's stage name. Shortly after the group's formation, Medan-born Ceza Mutyara or DJ Cza joined them, completing the group as a quartet. In 2005, Ahli Fiqir released their first single, "Samseng", followed by their debut album, Hari Ini Dalam Sejarah. In 2006, the group won Best Singaporean Artist at the 2006 Anugerah Planet Muzik while their debut album won the Best Singaporean Album.

A year later, their second album, Rap Untuk Rakyat was released in mid-2007, two singles were released for the album. In 2008, Ahli Fiqir alongside Pop Shuvit (Malaysia), Saint Loco (Indonesia), Thaitanium, Silksounds and M.E.M. (all from Thailand) and Slapshock (Philippines) formed the supergroup known as Project E.A.R. (Project East Asian Revolution), a collective consists of Southeast Asian musicians. The group later released their debut and only EP, Irama Berima in August 2009, this time without Tukang Kata who left due to other commitments, Ahli Fiqir then continued as a trio. In April 2010, the group announced that they had officially disbanded. However, in 2012, the group reunited for short period to perform at the special concert to thanking their fans who supported them for years. The group has since gone indefinite hiatus as all of its members concentrated on their respective personal lives and careers.

== Discography ==
=== Studio albums ===
Title	Album details
Hari Ini Dalam Sejarah	Released: May 2005; Labels: Powder Records, Warner Music Malaysia; Formats: CD, cassette, digital download
Rap Untuk Rakyat	Released: June 2007; Labels: Powder Records, Warner Music Malaysia; Formats: CD, cassette, digital download

=== Extended play ===
Title	Album details
Irama Berima	Released: August 2009; Labels: Powder Records, Warner Music Malaysia; Formats: CD, digital download
Fiqir Fiqir	Released: October 2009; Labels: Powder Records, Warner Music Malaysia; Formats: CD, digital download

=== Singles ===
Title	Year
"Samseng"	2005
"Angguk-Angguk, Geleng-Geleng"	2005
"Tik Tok Simpati"	2006
"2x5"	2007
"Dia Datang"	2008
"Fiqir Fiqir"	2009
"Derita Merindu"	2009

=== Other appearances ===
Title	Year	Performing artist(s)
"Alhamdulillah"	2004	Too Phat, Yasin Sulaiman, Daly Ahli Fiqir, Dian Sastrowardoyo
"Pop Yeh Yeh"	2004	V.E, Joe Flizzow, Daly Ahli Fiqir
"Sayang Sayang"	2007	Altimet, Mawar Berduri
"Suara Kaki Lima"	2007	Pop Shuvit, Ahli Fiqir
"A.E.I.O.U."	2008	Elliza Razak, Ahli Fiqir
"Usah"	2008	Suki Low, Daly Ahli Fiqir
"Zakiah"	2009	Jinbara, Ahli Fiqir
"Jangan Lama-Lama"	2010	Jinbara, Ahli Fiqir

== Awards and nominations ==
Year	Awards	Category	Recipient/Nominated work(s)	Result
2006	2006 Anugerah Planet Muzik	Best Singaporean Artist	Ahli Fiqir	Won
2006	2006 Anugerah Planet Muzik	Best Singaporean Album	Hari ini Dalam Sejarah	Won
2006	13th Anugerah Industri Muzik	Best New Artist	Ahli Fiqir	Nominated
2006	13th Anugerah Industri Muzik	Best Music Video	"Angguk-Angguk, Geleng-Geleng"	Nominated
2010	17th Anugerah Industri Muzik	Best Hip Hop Album	Irama Berima	Nominated
