= Project 11-41 =

Studio album by Slapshock
- Released: June 2, 2002; January 2003 (Repackaged Edition)
- Studio: Tracks Studios
- Genre: Nu metal; alternative metal; rap metal
- Length: 1:20:42
- Label: EMI Philippines
- Producer: Rico Blanco

Slapshock chronology
Headtrip (2001)	Project 11-41 (2002)	Novena (2004)

Singles from Project 11-41
- 1. "Numb" Released: 2002; 2. "Queen Paranoia" Released: 2002; 3. "Wake Up" Released: June 2002

Professional ratings
Review scores
Source	Rating
AllMusic	4/5 stars

Project 11-41 is the third studio album by Filipino nu metal band Slapshock, released in 2002. It was certified platinum in the Philippines.

== Track listing ==
All tracks are written by Jamir Garcia, Music By Slapshock.

No.	Title	Length
1.	"Wake Up"	4:06
2.	"Satellite Kid"	5:21
3.	"Countdown"	4:51
4.	"Queen Paranoia"	4:30
5.	"Swallow"	3:58
6.	"Mother's Eye"	4:08
7.	"Get Down"	4:30
8.	"Windshield"	4:48
9.	"Numb"	5:39
10.	"Sunday Shivers"	4:53
11.	"Anino Mo"	4:59
12.	"Enemy"	5:15
13.	"Bleed"	4:29
14.	"Fuck U (Remix) (tracks ends in 4:30 and Bonus tracks "Burn My Skin" starts at 4:35)"	11:52

Bonus AVCD tracklist
No.	Title	Length
15.	"Bleed (Live at Folk Arts Theater)"	5:00
16.	"Shezzo Wicked (Live at Folk Arts Theater)"	5:11
17.	"Anino Mo (Live at Folk Arts Theater)"	4:55
18.	"Numb (Live at Folk Arts Theater)"	5:35

Bonus AVCD tracklist
No.	Title	Length
1.	"Queen Paranoia (Music Video)"	4:31

== Personnel ==
- Vladimir Garcia – lead vocals
- Lee Nadela - bass
- Leandro Ansing - guitar
- Jerry Basco - guitar, backing vocals
- Richard Evora – drums

Additional Musician:

- DJ Arbie Won - Turntablist (track 3)
- Mark Escueta - Drums (track 3 & 5)

== Credits ==
- Rico Blanco – producer
- Angee Rozul – engineer
