= 4th Degree Burn =

Studio album by Slapshock
- Released: 15 June 1999
- Recorded: 1998
- Studio: Tracks Recording Studio
- Genre: Rap metal; nu metal
- Length: 50:41
- Label: OctoArts-EMI Music Inc.
- Producer: Francis Reyes; Louie Talan

Slapshock chronology
| 4th Degree Burn (1999) | Headtrip (2001) |

Singles from 4th Degree Burn
- 1. "Agent Orange" Released: 1999; 2. "Sick Curtain" Released: 2000

Professional ratings
Review scores
| Source | Rating |
|---|---|
| AllMusic | 3/5 stars |

4th Degree Burn is the debut studio album by Filipino nu metal band Slapshock, released in 1999.

It was certified platinum in the Philippines.

== Track listing ==
All tracks are written by Slapshock

| No. | Title | Length |
|---|---|---|
| 1. | "High Times" | 3:13 |
| 2. | "Drown" | 3:42 |
| 3. | "Evil Clown" | 4:51 |
| 4. | "Madapaka" | 3:28 |
| 5. | "Shelter" | 4:00 |
| 6. | "Sgt.Trigger" | 4:02 |
| 7. | "Psycho Love" | 3:17 |
| 8. | "Sick Curtain" | 4:02 |
| 9. | "Sex Freak" | 4:19 |
| 10. | "Agent Orange" | 4:50 |
| 11. | "Sulok" | 3:46 |
| 12. | "Lo Mejor" | 3:22 |
| 13. | "Evil Clown" (Remix) | 3:39 |

== Personnel ==
- Vladimir "Jamir" Garcia – lead vocals
- Lee Nadela – bass
- Leandro Ansing – guitar
- Jerry Basco – guitar, backing vocals
- Richard Phaul "Chi" Evora – drums

Additional Musician

- Reg Rubio - Guest Vocals (track 6)
- Cecile Robledo - Guest Vocals (track 7)
- Ian Tayao - Guest Vocals (track 12)

== Production ==
- Executive producer: Chito R. Ilacad
- Supervising producer: Francis Guevarra
- Sound engineer: Angee Rozul
- Album cover and layout design: Rom Villaseran
- Additional live photo: Kathy Chua
- Clown remix: Ferq Foundation
