= Bayani: Fighting Game =

- Game logo
- Developer: Ranida Games
- Platform: Microsoft Windows
- Release: June 12, 2019 (early access)
- Genre: Fighting
- Modes: Single player, multiplayer

Bayani: Fighting Game, alternatively known as Bayani: Kanino Ka Kakampi? (transl. Hero: Who Will You Ally With?) is a Philippine indie fighting video game developed by Ranida Games which features characters inspired by historical figures from Philippine history.

== Characters ==
As of August 2018, the roster of Bayani features eight playable warriors. The roster consists of Joe Rizal, Dre, Rio, Tonio, Leon, Lolang Tsora, Fernando, and Oria.

== Development ==
=== Game design ===
Bayani was developed by Philippine game developer, Ranida Games. It is a 1-on-1 fighting game

Robert Edward Cruz is the lead game designer while a dedicated developer was tasked to work on one of the characters of the game. Anthony Dacayo is responsible for the character designs while cel shading is used to render the characters.

The characters are inspired from historical figures often considered as national heroes while historical events and landmarks were also used as basis for other elements of the game's design. However the game is set in the far future where the Philippines is known as the Neorepublic of the Philippines and Europe is known as Neuropa.

In terms of fighting mechanics, there are three types of attack commands; light, medium, heavy. Certain combinations allows players to perform combo attacks. Air juggle mechanic is also incorporated in the game allowing the player to send their opponent's character in the air and hit them multiple times before they fall to the ground.

=== Marketing ===
Bayani was first announced to the public by Ranida Games during the 2016 Electronic Sports and Gaming Summit at the SMX Convention Center in Pasay. A prototype version of the game featuring just two characters, Joe Rizal and Dre, was showcased with attendees allowed to play a demo of the game. At the 2017 iteration of the summit, Ranida Games showcased Bayani again.

From August 27 to 31, 2018 a more complete version of the game was made available for demo play at the SM City Masinag as a commemoration of National Heroes Day.

The game was officially released on June 12, 2019 on Steam for early access, the full version is in development and other consoles are planning in the future, but it was delayed due to the COVID-19 pandemic.
