= Headtrip (album) =

Studio album by Slapshock
- Released: January 26, 2001
- Studio: Tracks Studios
- Genre: Rap metal; nu metal
- Length: 1:00:45
- Label: OctoArts-EMI Music Inc.
- Producer: Francis Reyes; Louie Talan

Slapshock chronology
4th Degree Burn (1999)	Headtrip (2001)	Project 11-41 (2002)

Singles from Headtrip
- 1. "Get Away" Released: 2001

Professional ratings
Review scores
Source	Rating
AllMusic	3/5 stars

Headtrip is the second studio album by Filipino nu metal band Slapshock, released in 2001.

It was certified platinum in the Philippines.

== Track listing ==
All songs written by Jamir Garcia, Music By Slapshock

No.	Title	Length
1.	"Get Away"	4:58
2.	"Push Me"	4:11
3.	"Fuck You"	5:12
4.	"Shezzo Wicked"	4:49
5.	"Takot Sa'yo"	3:38
6.	"Circus Jesus"	5:05
7.	"27 Suicide Kings"	3:51
8.	"Purple"	4:56
9.	"Like U"	5:23
10.	"Point Blank"	5:05
11.	"My Skar"	3:45
12.	"Slap Vs Freak"	4:27
13.	"Sick Curtain (Cyco Remix)"	5:24

== Personnel ==
- Vladimir Garcia – lead vocals
- Lee Nadela – bass
- Leandro Ansing – guitar
- Jerry Basco – guitar, backing vocals
- Richard Evora – drums

Additional musicians

- Myra Ruaro – vocals, guest appearance on "My Skar"
- Freq Foundation – Slap Vs Freak Remix
- Francis Guevarra – Sick Curtain Remix

== Production ==
- Executive producer: Chito R. Ilacad
- Supervising producer: Francis Guevarra
- Sound engineer: Angee Rozul
- Album cover and layout design: Rom Villaseran
- Additional live photos: Ayan Tolentino, Jim Ayson
