= Pop Shuvit (band) =

Malaysian rap rock band

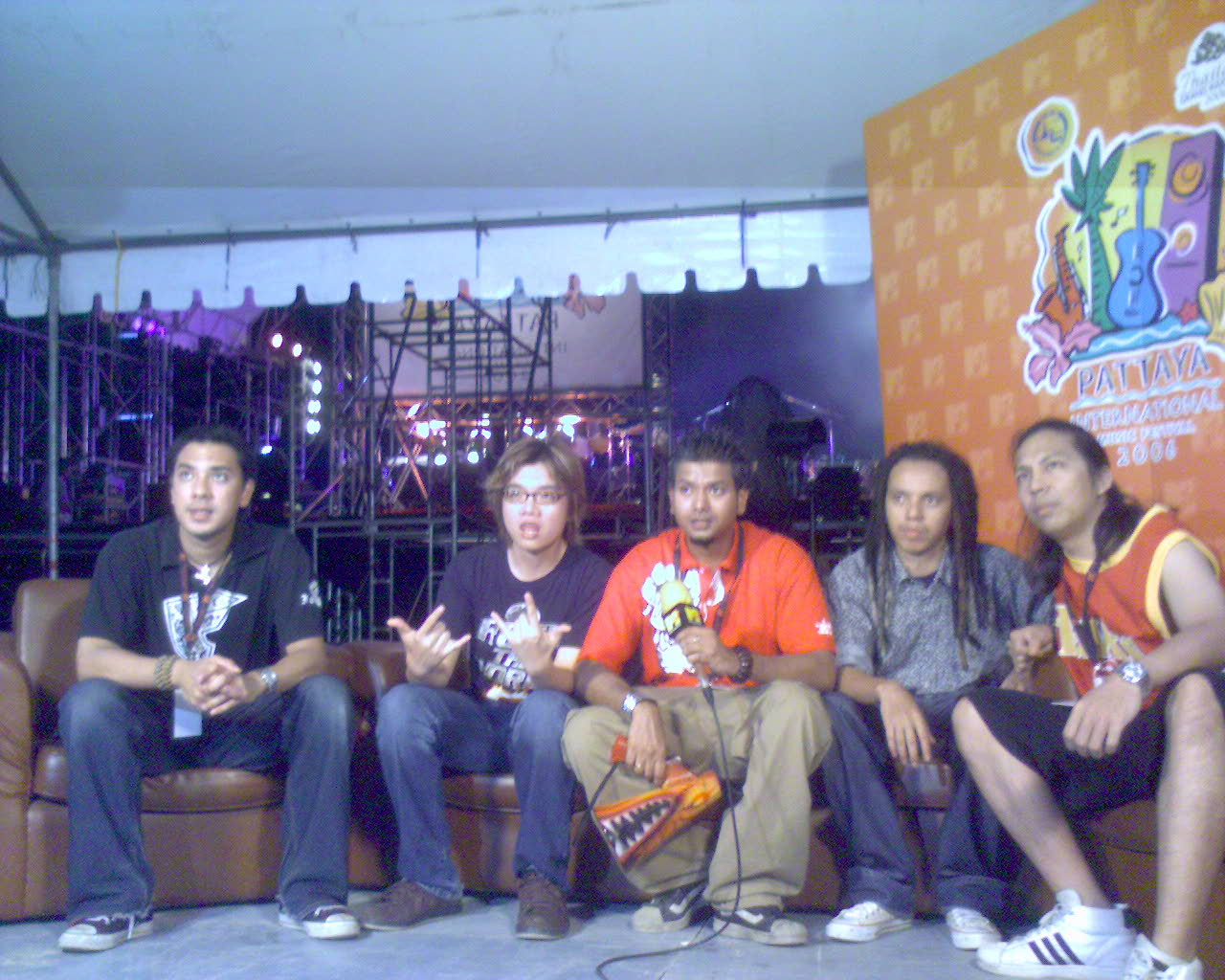
- Pop Shuvit in 2006

Background information
- Origin: Kuala Lumpur, Malaysia
- Genres: Hip hop; rap rock; hardcore punk; nu metal
- Years active: 2001—present
- Label: Shuvit Management
- Spinoffs: Project E.A.R.
- Members: Muralidharan Marimuthu (Moots!); Jedidiah Wong (JD); Nazrin Nasir (AJ); Azlan Rudy Malik (Rudy); Syazlee Zalsyam Zakaria (DJ Uno)
- Past members: Nicholas Ong (Point Blanc)

Pop Shuvit is a Malaysian rap rock band. Comprising Moots! (MC), JD (vocals, guitar), AJ (bass guitar), Rudy (drums) and DJ Uno (vocals, DJ), the band who got its name from a skateboarding trick of almost the same name began making waves in the local music scene in late 2001 and since then, has had 5 successful releases under their belt and gained a sizeable fanbase in Asia notably in Malaysia, Japan, Thailand and Singapore. Known for their adrenaline-packed live shows and eclectic blend of hip hop and rock, Pop Shuvit are being touted as Asia's leading hip hop rock band. They also founded a South east Asian collective called Project E.A.R (East Asian Revolution) with a show stopping performance at the MTV asia awards in 2008 together with dandee and thaitanium (Thailand), slapshock (Philippines), Saint Loco (Indonesia) and Daly Ahli FIqir (Singapore).

== History ==
Pop Shuvit originally have six members upon its establishment in 2001. One of them is Nicholas Ong Chong Quan or popularly known as Point Blanc, former member of Malaysian hip hop group, Poetic Ammo as the co-vocalist. He left the band in early 2004 after the release of Take It & Shuvit to concentrate on Poetic Ammo and later pursue his solo career, leaving Moots! as the sole vocalist of the band.

=== Take It and Shuvit ===
Their debut album Take It & Shuvit was released in November 2002. Prior to its official release, Pop Shuvit was banned by certain radio stations due to their sound was deemed "too loud". The album broke new ground when their first single "Skaters' Anthem" was released exclusively on the Internet and became one of the most downloaded local songs in Malaysian music history. The hype and street buzz from the track caught the ears of ESPN, who in turn licensed the track for use in their Summer X-Games broadcast that hit millions of households worldwide. As further credit to Pop Shuvit, ESPN played their music videos and tracks off the album throughout the duration of competition.

In 2003, Pop Shuvit released Take it & Shuvit in Japan and became the first Malaysian band to hit the music chart in Japan. The overwhelming support from Japanese youth market ensured that all tracks of the album charted the top 20 on the Tower Records sales charts (even beating raprock luminaries like Linkin Park) without any promotion to back the album.

=== Here and Now ===
The success of their releases in Japan led to Pop Shuvit touring the land of the rising sun in 2005 to support their second release, Here & Now, leading to one of the most successful and talked about headlining tours for any Malaysian rock band. The album was a hard-hitting social commentary of urban culture and spurred hits like Old Skool Rocka and Journey, with the latter earning the band the No. 1 Song of the year on the Malaysian English Top Ten for 2005 and "Best Rock Act”

=== The Shuvit Remixes ===
The band released a dance remix album, The Shuvit Remixes and a hip hop EP, All I Got Hop Hop Collaboration in 2004 and 2006 respectively. The remix of their track "Conversations" from The Shuvit Remixes was hand picked by DJ Nick Warren for inclusion in pioneering UK dance music label Global Underground's mix CD, Shanghai GU28 that peaked at No. 19 on the UK TOP 40 Dance Album Charts. The hip hop EP, a 4 track 12 inch vinyl release, featured collaborations with some of hip hop's most respected emcees from around the globe, including US emcees Rapper Big Pooh from Little Brother.

In mid-2006, Pop Shuvit collaborated with Disagree, another Malaysian rock band, to produce the song "Football Mad Nation" in conjunction with the FIFA World Cup.

=== Amped and Dangerous ===
Pop Shuvit's third album, Amped & Dangerous hit stores in Japan on 23 August 2006 without a release in the Malaysian market. The 12-song set is described as "a rollercoaster ride of crunching guitars", pounding rhythms and funked out hip hop beats and rhymes. "This is essentially a guitar driven album that's made for the mosh pit. Simply put, it rocks harder!" says skinman Rudy about the new material. Malaysian fans would expect something different as Guitarist/Producer JD hinted, "We had to think strategically this time around and only release tracks that cater for a specific market so the Japanese/Asian and Malaysian editions will be different." The Japanese edition of the album will be released throughout Asia as an import edition so fans will still be able to obtain both copies. Pop Shuvit walked away with the "Best Live Act" at the Malaysian English Top Ten Awards 2006.

=== Freakshow Vol. 1: Tales of The Travelling Tunes ===
Pop Shuvit recently released their fourth Studio Album, Freakshow Vol. 1: Tales of the Travelling Tunes with the first single of the album being, Freakshow which featured Dandee from Silksounds. "Marabahaya" was from this album which is the 1st single from the Impak Maksima soundtrack. "Marabahaya" has received very high rotation on both hitz.fm and Fly FM and it is one of the crowds favourite.

=== My Chemical Romance Asian tour ===
Pop Shuvit was the official opening act for My Chemical Romance on their Asian tour. Gerard Way was impressed after Pop Shuvit opened for them in Kuala Lumpur so MCR offered Pop Shuvit the opportunity to be their opening act for their five remaining shows. However Pop Shuvit had other commitments so they only accepted two.

=== Project E.A.R. ===
Pop Shuvit, together with Ahli Fiqir (Singapore), Saint Loco (Indonesia), Slapshock (Philippines), Silksounds and Thaitanium (Thailand), formed a supergroup called Project E.A.R. (East Asian Revolution), which made their debut in the 2008 MTV Asia Awards in Malaysia.

=== MTV World Stage Live 2011 ===
At the MTV World Stage Live in Malaysia 2011 that took place at I-City, Shah Alam, Pop Shuvit shared the stage with Kpop sensation, Beast, alternative rock band Neon Trees, and multiple MTV award-winning Thirty Seconds to Mars. Pop Shuvit kick-off the show with "Old Skool Rocka". Performing "Oh! Sizuka" as the second song and followed by "Running Away," a new song from the new album Cherry Blossom Love Affair. Malaysian legend Man Bai then joined Pop Shuvit on stage for the first-ever live performance of "Seperti Syurgamu", another new song from the new album. Next, Project E.A.R. (East Asian Revolution) also came on the stage for "Mantera/Marabahaya" and the band wrapped up with lead singer Moots stage diving into the mosh pit.

=== Marabahaya XV ===
On 21 April 2024, Pop Shuvit released a trailer for 'Marabahaya XV' on their official YouTube account.

On 26 April 2024, the music video for 'Marabahaya XV' was released on Pop Shuvit's official YouTube account which was directed by longtime Project E.A.R. collaborator, Dandee. Featured Artists' included Shigga Shay, SonaOne & Tarvethz.

== Band members ==
Current

- Murali Dharan "Moots!" Marimuthu – MC (2001–present)
- Jedidiah "JD" Wong Jhin Yee – vocals, guitar (2001–present)
- Nazrin "AJ" Mohd Nasir – bass guitar (2001–present)
- Azlan "Rudy" Abdul Malik – drums (2001–present)
- Syazlee Zalsyam "DJ Uno" Zakaria – vocals, DJ (2001–present)

Past

- Nicholas "Point Blanc" Ong Chong Quan – MC (2001–2004)

== Discography ==
=== Studio albums ===
- Take It & Shuvit (2002)
- Here & Now (2005)
- Amped & Dangerous (2006)
- Freakshow Vol. 1: Tales of the Travelling Tunes (2007)
- Cherry Blossom Love Affair (2011)
- Phantom Frequencies (2024)

=== Other albums ===
- Take It & Shuvit Again (2003)
- The Shuvit Remixes (2004)
- All I Got Hip Hop Collaboration (2006)

== Awards ==
- 15th Anugerah Industri Muzik
  - Anugerah Kembara
- 17th Anugerah Industri Muzik
  - Best Music Video (Oh! Sizuka)
