= K-Town Clan =

Hip-hop group from Kajang, Malaysia

- Origin: Kajang, Selangor, Malaysia
- Genres: Hip hop; crunk; world; experimental hip hop
- Labels: The Goodfellaz Enterprise
- Members: Big Bo; Roshan Jamrock; Dra-Vid
- Website: www.ktownkings.com

K-Town Clan (also abbreviated as KTC) is a Malaysian-based hip hop group from Kajang, Malaysia. The group has written and produced several chart-topping hit singles on national radio, and was shortlisted to Top 50 for an international music production competition organized by Timbaland.

They have shared the stage with international acts such as Status Quo, Demi Lovato, the Backstreet Boys, and 2NE1. They were also the opening acts for artists Fatman Scoop and Lil Jon on their tour in Malaysia. K-Town Clan is known for introducing the hip hop subgenre of crunk to Malaysia, along with their energetic and high octane performances.

== History ==
=== Formation ===
K-Town Clan was formed by schoolmates in their hometown of Kajang, Malaysia, sometime in the early 2000s. The group consists of three rappers, known by their stage names Big Bo, Roshan Jamrock and Dra-Vid.

As a child, Jamrock's parents exposed him to music, including bands such as Lynyrd Skynyrd, The Beatles, and Gipsy Kings, among many others. His cousins who were studying in the United States introduced hip hop artists like Tupac, 2 Live Crew, and Snoop Dogg. Jamrock then met Dra-Vid at Kajang High School when he was 13 years old, and discovered they had the same interests and passion. They also met Big Bo, and would eventually form the trio K-Town Clan.

In 2004, the group made their debut appearing on a national talent search competition called BlastOff, in which they were crowned the Grand Champions during the finale. Some time after, in the Orange Club at Kuala Lumpur, they had an audition and performed Lil' Jon & the East Side Boyz's song Get Low. This earned them 10,000 ringgit and a trip to London. Following the events, K-Town Clan released their debut single Come Get Some in 2008, which made it onto the local radio station's top 10.

=== Hiatus, Playground, and Crunk Cowboys and the Moon $hine Music (2011–present) ===
After releasing their debut single, the group went on hiatus until 2011. They then got together and performed at the International College of Music's hip hop contest in 2011, where they once again reached the top. K-Town Clan eventually released their second hit single Give Em The Ughh and their debut studio album Playground in September 2011.

Their second album Crunk Cowboys and the Moon $hine Music, is expected to be released on January 31, 2018.

== Discography ==
=== Studio albums ===
- Playground (2011)
- Crunk Cowboys and the Moon $hine Music (2018)

== See also ==
- List of Malaysian hip hop artists
- Poetic Ammo
