= Cesar Comanche =

American rapper (born 1976)

- Born: Christopher Robinson; November 18, 1976 (age 49)
- Origin: Jacksonville, North Carolina, US
- Genres: Hip hop
- Occupation: Rapper
- Instrument: Vocals
- Years active: 2001–present
- Label: DOTFW
- Website: cesarcomanche.8m.com

Christopher Robinson (born November 18, 1976), known by his stage name Cesar Comanche, is an American rapper.

== Biography ==
Comanche is one of the founding members of North Carolina–based The Justus League.

Originally from Jacksonville, North Carolina, he began rhyming in 1994, but did not pursue is as a career until 1996. In that same year, he met producer 9th Wonder, and began performing live and recording songs.

In 1999, Comanche and 9th Wonder organized other industry colleagues and artists from the Triangle area to form the Justus League crew in 1999. He has since performed with Tha Liks, The Coup, Hieroglyphics, Z-Man, Dilated Peoples, Living Legends, Wordsworth, Aceyalone, and O.C.

Comanche regularly tours across the globe in many countries including the US, the UK, Estonia, Poland, Sweden, Canada, Germany, Denmark, France, Romania, Croatia, Switzerland, and Austria. He has also appeared on television shows such as Time Warner Cable's Music Choice Rap Channel, NBC's Hip Hop Nation, WB Network's Distortion 2 Static and Little Brother's "You Hear It First" segment on MTV2. He has also been featured in several music videos, including Little Brother's "Speed" and his own "Lamb to Lion" video which won a "Most Creative Atmosphere" award from the University of North Carolina at Chapel Hill.

Comanche has independently released two solo albums on his own Defenders of the Free World imprint (2000's Wooden Nickels and 2002's Paper Gods) and with Blues Interactions (2005's Squirrel and The Aces The Japan Tour) with ABB Records (2005's Squirrel and The Aces) and has appeared on Little Brother's The Listening LP, Edgar Allen Floe's True Links LP, featured in the theme song This Side of the River of the Princeville, NC Documentary; Away Team; Legacy; and 9th Wonder's National Mayhem Triple album; Eternia's It's Called Life LP, the Justus League's NC State of Mind Vol. 1 mixtape, and the Hall of Justus' Singles Files mixtape.

During time off from his extensive touring schedule, Comanche is currently recording for his fifth album, tentatively titled, Die In Your Lap.

== Discography ==
=== Albums ===
- Wooden Nickels (2000)
- Paper Gods (2002)
- Squirrel and The Aces: The Japan Tour (2005)
- Squirrel and The Aces (2005)
- Wooden Nickels Revisited (2006)
- Die In Your Lap (2009)
- Like a Night In the Thief (2014)

=== Features ===
- The Listening Little Brother (2002)
- NC State of Mind Justus League (2003)
- City Lights Nicolay (2004)
- Single Files DJ Flash (2004)
- Hub City Revival DJ KO (2004)
- Mixology DJ Fuzz (2004)
- Streetwise LP Edgar Allen Floe (2004)
- Real Shit Djimon (2005)
- Bakers Dozen ABB Records (2005)
- It's Called Life Eternia (2005)
- The Dream Merchant Vol. 1 9th Wonder (2005)
- This Side of the River Documentary - Princeville Soundtrack (2006)
- Simbiosis El Cerebro (2007)
- Freakshow Vol. 1 "Tales of the Traveling Tunes" Pop Shuvit (2007)

=== Engineering Credits ===
- Paper Gods Cesar Comanche (2002)
- Mixology DJ Fuzz (2004)
- Squirrel and The Aces: The Japan Tour Cesar Comanche (2005)
- Squirrel and The Aces Cesar Comanche (2005)
- Chain Letters Supastition (2005)
- Monkey Barz Sean Price (2005)
- Chemistry Buckshot & 9th Wonder (2005)
- Reloaded Smif-n-Wessun (2005)
- This Side of the River Documentary - Princeville Soundtrack (2006)
- Simbiosis El Cerebro (2007)
- Median's Relief Median (2007)
- Freakshow Vol. 1 "Tales of the Traveling Tunes" Pop Shuvit (2007)
