= Silence (Slapshock album) =

Studio album by Slapshock
- Released: May 26, 2006
- Genres: Alternative metal; metalcore
- Length: 50:40
- Label: EMI Philippines
- Producer: Francis Reyes

Slapshock chronology
Novena (2004)	Silence (2006)	Cariño Brutal (2009)

Singles from Silence
- 1. "Direction" Released: April 25, 2006; 2. "Waiting" Released: May 29, 2006; 3. "Adios" Released: January 12, 2007; 4. "Stranded" Released: June 22, 2008

Professional ratings
Review scores
Source	Rating
AllMusic	3/5 stars
Ultimate Guitar	10/10 stars

Silence is the fifth studio album by Filipino heavy metal band Slapshock, released in 2006. The album introduced a metalcore sound, which was continued on subsequent releases.

== Track listing ==
All songs written by Jamir Garcia, Music By Slapshock

No.	Title	Length
1.	"Shed My Skin"	4:25
2.	"Direction"	3:40
3.	"Sleepless Blvd"	3:28
4.	"Last Ride"	3:26
5.	"Walk Away"	4:14
6.	"Adios"	4:34
7.	"What We Are"	4:13
8.	"Back Home"	3:20
9.	"Blisters"	3:22
10.	"Waiting"	3:58
11.	"Divine"	4:03
12.	"Pagtila"	3:52
13.	"Stranded"	4:06

== Personnel ==
- Jamir Garcia – lead vocals
- Richard Evora – drums
- Lee Nadela - bass
- Leandro Ansing - lead guitar
- Jerry Basco - rhythm guitar, backing vocals

== Credits ==
- Cassie Jayne Legaspi - Woman in the cover photo
- Francis Reyes – producer
- Angee Rozul – engineer
