= Cariño Brutal =

EP by Slapshock
- Released: October 31, 2009
- Recorded: 2009
- Studio: Shock Sounds Recording Studio
- Genre: Alternative metal; metalcore
- Length: 26:24
- Label: PolyEast
- Producer: Slapshock

Slapshock chronology
Silence (2006)	Cariño Brutal (2009)	Kinse Kalibre (2011)

Singles from Cariño Brutal
- 1. "Can't Stop Us Now" Released: June 19, 2009; 2. "Cariño Brutal" Released: October 30, 2009; 3. "Like Eskimo" Released: May 18, 2010

Cariño Brutal is the first EP by the Filipino heavy metal band Slapshock, It is the last record they released with Guitarist Jerry Basco, as he amicably left the band in 2009, released in 2009.

== Track listing ==
All songs written by Jamir Garcia, Music By Slapshock

No.	Title	Length
1.	"Stronger"	4:38
2.	"Alive"	4:11
3.	"Like Eskimo"	4:52
4.	"Forever"	4:11
5.	"Can't Stop Us Now"	4:06
6.	"Cariño Brutal"	4:25

Bonus DVD tracklist
No.	Title	Length
1.	"Footage From North American Tour 2009"
2.	"Footage From Canadian Tour 2008"
3.	"Music Video: Stranded; Sigaw; Cariño Brutal"

Professional ratings
Review scores
Source	Rating
ultimate-guitar.com	7/10 stars

== Personnel ==
- Jamir Garcia – lead vocals
- Chi Evora – drums
- Lee Nadela - bass
- Leandro Ansing - lead guitar
- Jerry Basco - rhythm guitar, backing vocals

== Production ==
- Produced by Slapshock
- Recorded and engineered by Lean Ansing at Slaphouse Studios, Alley 2, Project 6, Quezon City, Philippines
- Mixed by J.D. Wong at Twenty One O Five Productions 46A, Lorong Rahim Kajai 14, Tmn Tun Dr. Ismail 60000 Kuala Lampur, Malaysia
- Mastered by John Greenhaim Area 51 Mastering, San Francisco, California
- Photography by EverywhereWeShoot.com
- Packaging design by:TeamManila.com
- DVD created by Ayanstein Tolentino
