= Dabo (rapper) =

Japanese hip hop rapper (born 1975)

- Born: 芦田 大介 (Ashida Daisuke); January 6, 1975 (age 51); Noda, Chiba, Japan
- Occupations: Hip hop singer; rapper
- Years active: 1996–present

Dabo (ダボ); born 6 January 1975 is a Japanese hip-hop rapper. He first appeared on the Japanese hip-hop scene in the 1990s, collaborating in a Shakkazombie song, "Tomo ni ikkou". Since 2002, he has released three albums: Hitman (2002), Diamond (2003), and The Force (2006). Dabo's lyrics are more hard-edged than most J-pop, or Japanese pop, and represent a tough Japanese street culture. He also appears as a playable character in the Japanese version of Def Jam Vendetta.

== Music career ==
He became a member of Nitro Microphone Underground in 1997. In 1999 he released his first single, Mr. Fudatzkee. In 2001, he was the first Japanese artist to be signed by Def Jam Japan. That same year, he made his major debut as a solo artist releasing Platinum Tongue, which reached number fifteen on the Japanese (Oricon) music charts. In addition to his solo works, Dabo racked up numerous credits collaborating with various artists. In addition to his solo works, he has amassed more than 60 credits working with various artists.

== Discography ==
Solo Albums
Year	Title	Label
2001	Platinum Tongue (CD, analog)	Def Jam Japan (UICJ-1002)
2002	Hitman (CD, analog)	Universal Music
2003	Diamond (CD, analog)	Universal Music
2007	Baby Mario World (CD, analog)	Toshiba EMI
2010	Hi-Five (CD, analog)	Toshiba EMI

Solo Singles
Year	Title	Label
	Mr. Fudatzkee (analog)	
2000	Supadondada (CD, analog)	Reality (RLTCD-002)
2001	Hakushukassai (applause) (CD, analog)	Def Jam Japan (UICJ-5001)
2001	Zero (CD, analog)	Def Jam Japan (UICJ-5002)
2001	Pinky~dakara, sono te o hanashite ~ Feat. Tyler (CD, analog)	Def Jam Japan (UICJ-5003)
2001	Lexxxusgucci (CD, analog)	Def Jam Japan (UICJ-5005)
2002	D.A.B.O. (CD, analog)	Def Jam Japan (UICJ-5008)
2002	Ai wa Automa (Love is Automatic) Feat.Hi-D (CD, analog)	Def Jam Japan (UICJ-5010)
2002	Nee-D (Lady) Feat. Lisa (CD, analog)	Def Jam Japan (UICJ-5013)
2003	Clap Ya Hands (CD)	Def Jam Japan (UICJ-5022)
	Chosen One Feat. Chosen Lee (analog)	

Collaborations
Year	Title & Artist	Label
1997	Tomo ni Ikkou -version pure- Shakkazombie feat. Goretex, Suiken, Dabo, Macka-chin	Cutting Edge (CTCR-14082)
1998	Premium Magic Dabo	Polystar (PSCR-5697)
1998	Break Point DJ Sachiho feat. AKEEM DA MANAGOO, Dabo, Goku, K-BOMB, ZEEBRA	Gauss (GACR-2003)
1998	L'Adieu Tina feat. Dabo	Tokuma (TKCA-71712)
1999	64 BARS RELAY Shakkazombie feat. Dabo, XBS, Suiken (on JOURNEY OF FORESIGHT)	Cutting Edge (CTCR-14134)
2000	Liquid of Love Tyler feat. Dabo	BMG (FHCB-5002)
2000	Taboo -Fore Play Mix DJ Hasebe feat. Momoko Suzuki, Dabo	Warner (WPC6-10070)
2000	33:25 (Wussup Tokyo!?) Dabo & Buckwild (on Syncronicity 2nd Session)	Future Shock (PSCR-5870)
2000	Dialogue Goku feat. Dabo	Ai Network (EWCC-86502)
2000	Akugi Deli feat. Goretex, Suiken, S-Word, Dabo (on Aquarius)	Reality (RLTCD-006)
	3 Oze Hardway P.H. feat. Dabo, Mummy-D	
2000	Relax Matha F*ka G.K. Maryan feat. Goretex, Macka-chin, Dabo, Suiken, Gama	Entsutsu (ERCD-2002)
2000	Daisan Ninja Kieru Makyuu feat. Dabo	Daisan Ninjya (D3N-CD-001)
2000	Ketatsu(?) Tokyo DJ Oasis feat. Dabo, S-Word (on Tokyo Desert)	SME (AICT-1274)
2000	Queens IS (Remix) LL Cool J feat. Dabo	Def Jam (UICD-6011)
2000	Nitro Microphone Underground Nitro Microphone Underground	Def Jam Japan (UICJ-1001)
2001	Dear Sweet Love -Afterglow Version Kaana feat. Dabo	Toshiba EMI (TOCT-4274)
2001	Shonan Hustler 2 Zebra feat. Dabo, Uzi, G.K.Maryan	Future Shock (PSCR-5987)
2001	Tekitou a.k.a Shunkashuutou Macka-chin feat. S-Word, XBS, Dabo, Bigzam, Goretex, Suiken, Deli (on CHIN ATTACK)	Reality (RLTCD-007)
2001	Honey Love (Hot) DJ Masterkey feat. Dabo (on Daddy's House Vol.1)	Life (LECD-10001)
2001	Brotherhood Kawabata and Dabo (on The Way We Are)	/DefStar (DFCL-1052)
2001	In My World Dabo feat. Pushim	KI/OON (KSCL-423)
2001	Jolty Floor (Live at DBEB) Eternal B and Dabo (on ESDN)	Warner Indies (WINN-82091)
	It's Okay Shakkazombie feat. Dabo	
	Are You Ready for D Deli feat. Dabo (on Kuchiguruma)	
	Nani Hoshii? Soul Scream feat. Dabo	
	Nitemare DJ Masterkey feat. Dabo, Suiken, Deli, Bigzam	
	Midnight Kingdom DJ Hazime feat. Big Dick Bruna a.k.a. Dabo, Bigzam, C.T (on Harlem ver.1.0)	
	Let Me Ge-ology feat. Dabo and Truth Enola	
	Do or Die Q and Dabo	
	One Shot 1 Kiri Gagle feat. Dabo	
	Two Timing Tyler feat. Big-O and Dabo	
	? Tsutchie feat. Dabo	
	Winding Road BoA feat. Dabo	
	Sing my Life Suite Chic feat. Dabo	
	Keep Rollin Ozrosaurus feat. Dabo and Uzi	
	I Wanna Know You (J.J. remix) Pushim feat. Dabo (on Dancehallic)	
	Customize Mabo(=Macka-chin + Dabo) (on 3 on 3)	
	The Shwing Lisa feat. Dabo	
	Koko ni Touch! D.O.I. feat. Dicky-Dee a.k.a. Dabo, Pushim	
	In Da Club (Bounce with Me) DJ Yutaka feat. Dabo	
	Koko Tokyo Aquarius feat. Big-O, Dabo, S-Word	
	Training Day Ganxsta D.X feat. Dabo, DJ Toshiki	
	Big Bangz S-Word feat. Deli, Dabo, Macka-chin, Goretex, Suiken, Bigzam, XBS (on STAR ILL WARZ)	
	Playboy AI feat. Dabo	
	Twisted Galaxy Revolver Flavour feat. Dabo, Low-IQ-01	
	It's My Turn (Fight !!!) Dabo	
	Who Dat? aile feat. Dabo	
	Big Shit Kieru Makyuu feat. Dabo, Youth	
	Ya Heard!? Pt.2 Sphere of Influence feat. Dabo & Tokona-X	
	What's going on HI-D feat. Dabo, Twigy & DJ Beat	
	Unstoppable Equal feat. Dabo	
	One (Remix) XBS feat. Bigzam, Dabo, Deli, Goretex	
	21MC Romero SP feat. Triptik, F.U.T.O, Maccho, Akitaken Dobuana, MC Q, Den, Buck Town Yas, Smooth B, MC Poppo, Luna, Dirty Harry Potter, Afra, Hannya, Rude Boy Face, Dabo, 565, Masaru, Uzi, Zebra, E.G.G. Man, Chada Man	
	Put Your Fist Up Maguma MC'S feat. Dabo	
	HOW WE LOW ~who the finest. who the biggest~ Tokona-X feat. Dabo, Bigzam, Mr.Oz	
	O.P.D. Michico feat. Dabo and Mikris	
	Ring My Bell Tyler feat. Dabo	
	Thunder Break Beats Kaminari-Kazoku. feat. AI, Habiscream, Dabo	
	Put Ya Hands Up Romero SP feat. Dabo	
	This Is How We Do DJ Celory a.k.a. Mr.Beats feat. Dabo, HI-D	
	CHECK MATE SSG feat. Dabo	
	Wick-Wick-Wack (Pop Killa 2004) Illicit Tsuboi feat. F-deezee a.k.a. Dabo, Mikris	
	Platinum # HGSP feat. Dabo, 4WD	
	Party Up Home Grown feat. Dabo	
	Hot Dance Hall Corn Head feat. Dabo, Akitaken Dobuana	
	Toriitomento Kreva feat. Dabo, Cuezero	
	All I Got Pop Shuvit feat. Dabo	
2010	"I Rep" Dabo, Anarchy & KREVA	Lexington Co., Ltd
2011	"ケツにマシンガン(REMIX)" feat. DJ TY-KOH, K DUB SHINE & SHINGO★西成	
2011	Tokyo Headz Bigzam feat. Dabo, Micho & Jiro (prod. by JOE IRON)	BIGBANG (Bigbang-001)
2014	東京弐拾伍時 Dabo, Macka-Chin, Suiken & S-word (prod. by DJ Hazime & Bachlogic)	Lexington Co., Ltd
