= Novena (album) =

Studio album by Slapshock
- Released: 2004
- Studio: Backyard Project Studios, Cebu City, Cebu
- Genre: Alternative metal; nu metal
- Length: 47:13
- Label: EMI Philippines
- Producer: Francis Reyes

Slapshock chronology
Project 11-41 (2002)	Novena (2004)	Silence (2006)

Singles from Novena
- 1. "We Are One" Released: August 2, 2004; 2. "Misterio" Released: 2004; 3. "Miles Away" Released: May 2005

Professional ratings
Review scores
Source	Rating
AllMusic	3/5 stars

Novena is the fourth studio album by Filipino alternative metal band Slapshock, released in 2004.

It was certified gold in the Philippines.

== Track listing ==
All songs written by Jamir Garcia, Music By Slapshock

No.	Title	Length
1.	"We Are One"	4:24
2.	"The Gift"	4:22
3.	"Runaway"	4:23
4.	"Lie (One More Day)"	3:59
5.	"Something Beautiful"	3:47
6.	"Inside Out"	4:25
7.	"March Of The Ants"	3:14
8.	"Dead Like Me"	3:40
9.	"Return Of The Samurai"	3:07
10.	"Great Escape"	3:48
11.	"Misterio"	4:02
12.	"Miles Away"	4:04

== Personnel ==
- Vladimir Garcia – lead vocals
- Lee Nadela - bass
- Leandro Ansing - guitar
- Jerry Basco - guitar, backing vocals
- Richard Evora – drums

Additional Musician:

- Jun-Rey Parajes - violin, guest appearance
- Tooting Demeterio - vocals, guest appearance
- Papa Sok Alfafara - percussion, guest appearance

== Album Credits ==
- Francis Reyes – producer
- Angee Rozul – engineer

== Accolades ==
Year	Award giving body	Category	Nominated work	Result
2005	Nu 107.5 Year End Countdown	Top 20 OPM Songs on the 2004 NU107 Countdown	"We Are One"	8th
2005	Nu 107.5 Year End Countdown	Top 107 Songs for 2004	"We Are One"	13th
