= Butterfingers (Malaysian band) =

Malaysian rock band

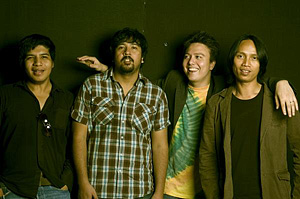

Background information
- Origin: Kuala Lumpur, Malaysia
- Genres: Alternative rock, grunge, post-grunge
- Years active: 1993–2009, 2016 (1st Reunion), 2019 – present (2nd Reunion)
- Labels: EMI Malaysia, Butterworld
- Spinoffs: monoloQue, Emmett I, Scan
- Members: Emmett: Loque; Kadak; Loko; Kalai; Numlock

Butterfingers is a Malaysian rock band that was formed in 1993. It is one of the most successful of the bands in the Malaysian underground and mainstream music industry that performed in English during the early 1990s. The band has produced three demos, two compilations and six studio albums, the first four sung in English and the other two in Malay.

== Band members ==
- Emmett Roslan Ishak – lead vocals, rhythm guitar, violin, ukulele, piano
- Khairil 'Loque' Ridzwan Anuar – lead guitar, vocals, keyboard, piano, samples
- Mohd Fakharudin 'Kadak' Mohd Bahar – bass
- Noor Haffizal 'Loko' Rashid – drum, percussion
- Former members – Khairul 'Kalai' Mois – drum, Azmir 'Numlock' Karim – programming
- Occasional live members – 'Kuduk' (drums), 'Batak' (guitar, keyboard), Greg Henderson (lead guitar)

== Biography ==
=== History ===
In 1991, a group of students at Malay College Kuala Kangsar (MCKK), which included Loque, Kadak and Kalai (who joined the band soon after their drummer left), formed a band called Loque's Tail. Producing their own material, the band was heavily influenced by Metallica. Later, the grunge genre was making waves in Malaysia and Loque's Tail decided to have a change in their musical direction from metal to grunge and punk.

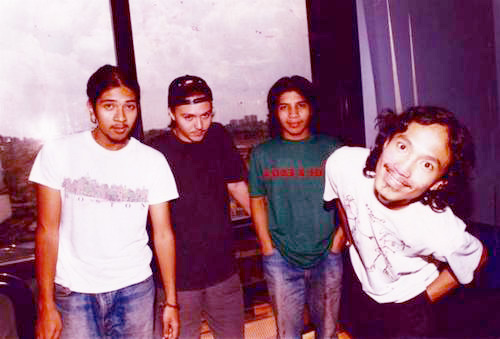
Original line-up, from left – Loque, Emmett, Kadak & Kalai

During a school break in 1993, Loque frequently visits a jamming studio named the Black Widow Studios in Petaling Jaya. During one of his visits he bumped into Emmett, who was there jamming with his own band at the time, Grunge Dayz. Impressed with Emmett's cover of "Under the Bridge" by Red Hot Chili Peppers, Loque then show his skills on "I Could Have Lied" to Emmett. Loque approached him to form a new band, which they finally settled on Butterfingers for the band's name. Not long after, Butterfingers was a hit in the local underground scene, playing in packed gigs.

Butterfingers produced their first pair of demos in 1994, "Girl Friday"(Butterfingers first song) and When You're Addicted (later renamed to "Nicc o'Tynne"), which were first performed at the Cobra Club House, circa late 1994 and early 1995. With the positive feedback and confidence received from the gig, they decided to record more songs.

12 goats, 6 oranges and 2 angles was their first demo, which came from a live session at FM Studio on 10 January 1995. The demo displayed the raw energy they were known for, and heavily influenced by grunge with Emmett's vocals being presented in the same fashion as Kurt Cobain's. Many of the locals had the impression that their demo was an unreleased Nirvana album. Later on, Butterfingers became a staple name in underground scene, along with other bands such as OAG, The Splatters and Spiral Kinetic Circus. They then released further demo tapes such as Butter Couldn't Melt, and Dragon.

=== Rise To Fame (1996–1999) ===
Butterfingers then released their debut album, 1.2 Miligrams (1996) after signing with EMI Malaysia. The album is quoted to have been "...laced with Nirvana-esque tunes, much like Mudhoney's early albums...". The album went on to achieve the local Gold status for sales of over 15,000 units. They went on to release their second album Butter Worth Pushful (1997) with a much more matured sound which debuted at number six on the Malaysian International RIM Charts, a first ever for a local band. The album continued to propel Butterfingers to a higher level of local fame, earning them their second consecutive Gold status (with an estimated total of over 18000 units sold), and it also gave them their first AIM (Anugerah Industri Muzik or Music Industry Award) nominations for 'Best Engineered Album' and 'Best English Album'.

In March 1999, Transcendence (1999) debuted at the number three on the RIM International Charts was released and sold over 60,000 units, which was considered to be Butterfinger's best work. The album went on to earn Butterfingers their first Double Platinum Award. This album also contains their most well-known song, "The Chemistry (Between Us)".

=== Post Transcendence & Hiatus (2000–2015) ===
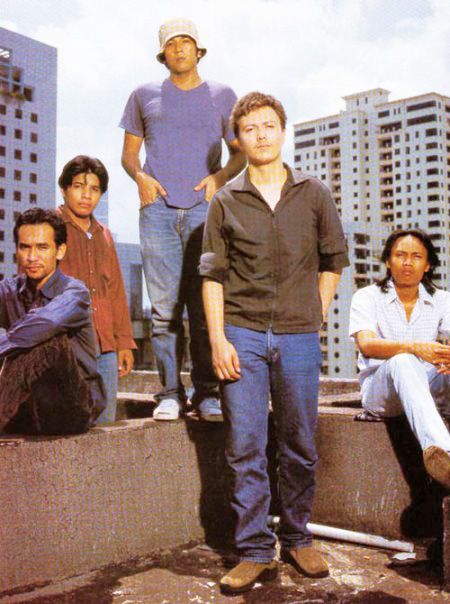
2001, from left – Numlock, Kadak, Loque, Emmett & Loko

After the success of Transcendence and the release of Butter Late Than Never (2000), a collection of old live tracks and outtakes with some previously unreleased songs from earlier demos, Butterfingers released Malayneum (2001) to critical acclaim, despite the mixed reaction from fans who still wanted a more 'grunge-y' sound the band was known for. After the release of a greatest hits album The Best is Yet to Come (2003), the band started working on their next album which would eventually become their first album that was sung in the Malay Language, entitled Selamat Tinggal Dunia (2005).

In 2003, Emmett had left to pursue his studies in Canada, leaving the rest of the band to release and promote Selamat Tinggal Dunia without him. Loque later left for Berklee College of Music in Boston in 2006.

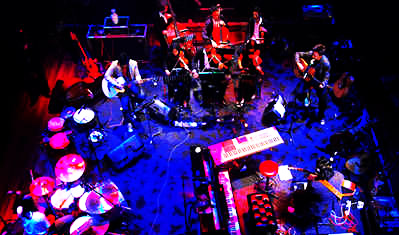
Butterfingers full line-up farewell show at Istana Budaya, Kuala Lumpur

After returning from Boston, Loque started a new project called monoloQue. Loque was reported to have said that he has no interest reforming Butterfingers in a recent interview:

"To me there's no point in repeating myself. I'm not trying to be Metallica here, or Wings, or Search. To gather old fans and play the old songs. I don't really mind it. I need to progress. As a composer, as an artist I really need to try new things. There's always a stigma with Butterfingers. I've accepted it. That's why I don't do 'Butterfingers X' or 'Real Butterfingers'. monoloQue is a different entity entirely. Even though my element will always be 'Butters'. The sound is me, I'm 'Butters'. No matter how you take me out of the equation. Apart from the songs and the sound, it's me, Emmett, Kadak and Loko. So when you say Butterfingers, it has to be all of us because people want to hear Emmett, they want to hear Kadak's sound, and Loko. Up until Malayneum (2001) the Butterfingers thing was going smoothly; up to Selamat Tinggal Dunia (2005), it had already gone into a writer's block phase for me. And I don't know how I came up with those songs. That's what makes the album special to me. 'Butters' will always be inside me, I started it all and it's my baby. So when fans cannot accept things as they have gone now, I just feel they need to move on as well. They cannot be selfish to ask me to play Butterfingers again. It's not because I don't want to because of monoloQue, I did monoloQue because I already made an oath to myself – I'd rather sell 10 records loving what I'm playing than selling 100,000 copies and waiting before, with limitations and obligations towards other people. I don't think I'll be doing scoring if I had stuck with Butterfingers, all the opportunities I can tell you came from my ideas with monoloQue. Thankfully, I'm happier now and can put food on the table with monoloQue."

Butterfingers ended their hiatus with another Malay album which would also be their last album together, Kembali (2008). The album was well received by fans and critics alike.

On 17–18 January 2009, they performed an unplugged session at Istana Budaya.

On 29 March 2009, they performed their farewell show at the Sunburst Music Festival at Bukit Kiara Equestrian Club, Kuala Lumpur. Butterfingers performed with Greg Henderson (who had replaced Loque, who was back in Boston).

Emmett returned to Malaysia and performed at the Petronas Technology University on July 31, 2015. Later, he also performed as "Emmett I" and have few single as a solo act.

In some interviews in 2009, Loque informed that the band was not disbanded but in a long hibernation mode because each band members were busy with their own career and project.

=== Reunion (2016 – present) ===
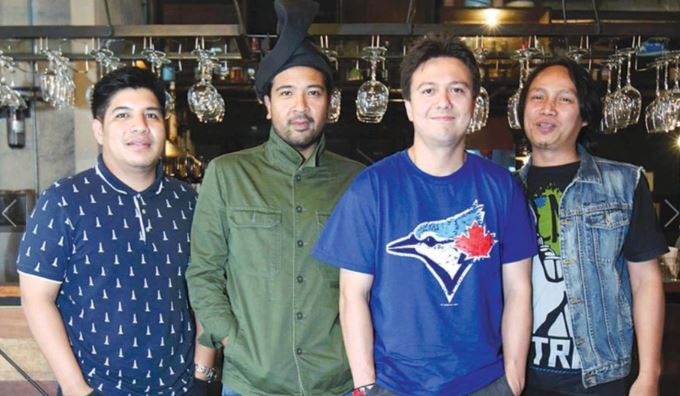
Butter's in 2016, From left: Kadak, Loque, Emmet and Loko

After a long hiatus, they reunited in 2016 and headlined the Rockaway Festival (ROCKAWAY THE SAGA CONTINUES) that took place on November 19 at Extreme Park, Bukit Jalil. The festival were divided by two phases and features international acts such as Scorpions, Third Eye Blind, Taking Back Sunday, and The Get Up Kids, Ron ‘Bumblefoot’ Thal, Malaysian's local acts such as Alleycats, Zainal Abidin, Wings, Deja Voodoo Spells, One Buck Short, Pop Shuvit, Hujan, Radhi OAG, Indonesia's The Changcuters and many more.

On 2 November 2019, the band had another reunion 'sold out' concert to celebrate the anniversary of their most best selling album in Malaysia's mainstream music industry which was the Transcendence (1999) album. The Butterfingers: Transcendence 20th Anniversary Concert was held at Malawati Stadium in Shah Alam in conjunction with the Selangor Youth Republic carnival and powered by TM's Unifi.

After the big success of Transcendence reunion concert, the band was also expected to perform at another music festival NUSAFEST 2020 at Bandar Malaysia, Kuala Lumpur in March with local acts such as Cromok, Joe Flizzow, Exists (Reunion), Rusty Blade, Indonesian act such as Slank, PADI Reborn, Seringai and many more. Due to COVID19 pandemic, the festival was postponed

== Musical style ==
Butterfingers music is often characterised under the genre of Grunge. As time went on, they have evolved with a more matured sound, progressing with multiple influence variations including alternative rock, post-grunge, classic rock, psychedelic rock, progressive rock and traditional/folk. During their English language era, the band's primary lyricist was Emmett, while Loque was the primary songwriter throughout the band's conception. Often attributed for their live performances, the band rarely perform in large venues such as arenas and amphitheaters. Instead, they regularly plays smaller venues. Loque once said in an interview, "We're definitely a live band. That's what it's all about for us. We make records so we can go out and play for the people."

== Discography ==
=== 1994 – 2 tracks untitled recording (Demo) ===
- 1. Girl Friday
- 2. When You're Addicted (later renamed to "Nicc o'Tynne")

=== 1995 – 12 goats, 6 oranges and 2 angels (Demo) ===
- 1. Wet Blanket
- 2. Ginseng
- 3. Kindergarten (later renamed to "Hatemaster")
- 4. When You're Addicted (later renamed to "Nicc o'Tynne")
- 5. Mystery
- 6. My Gum
- 7. Spoilt (later renamed to "Spoilt (in the end)")

=== 1996 – Butter Couldn't Melt (Demo) ===
- 1. LCD (Liquid Crystal Display)
- 2. Stolen
- 3. Fahrenheit
- 4. Jump 'n' Dive

=== 1996 – Dragon (Demo) ===
- 1. Stolen
- 2. Generation X
- 3. Ugly
- 4. Tune For Non-matured But Cool Teenagers

=== 1996 – 1.2 Milligrams(Butterworld/EMI) ===
- 1. Naive Sick Chasm
- 2. Chrome
- 3. Nicc o'Tynne
- 4. Me
- 5. Wet Blanket
- 6. F*
- 7. Royal Jelly
- 8. Ugly
- 9. In the Calm
- 10. Sober
- 11. 10db + Royal Jelly alt. take (hidden track)

=== 1997 – Butter Worth Pushful (Butterworld/EMI) ===
- 1. Fire is a Curse?
- 2. Girl Friday
- 3. E
- 4. Stolen
- 5. Vio-pipe
- 6. Apple Tree
- 7. Skew
- 8. Love
- 9. Ruin by the Selling Out
- 10. Delirium
- 11. Garden City of Lights
- 12. Still River + Vio-pipe alt. take (hidden track)

=== 1999 – Transcendence (Butterworld/EMI) ===
- 1. The Chemistry (Between Us)
- 2. Epitome
- 3. Meltdown
- 4. Mermaids (Fair-God & Stone Faces)
- 5. Doomsday Out
- 6. Faculties of the Mind
- 7. Floating in a Vacuum
- 8. Weird
- 9. RnR (Rock & Radical)
- 10. Mokhsha
- 11. Mystery
- 12. Words vs Wisdom + Noise + Inhale

=== 2000 – Butter Late Than Never (unreleased tracks, live and rarities) (Butterworld/EMI) ===
- 1. To Gather (demo)
- 2. Stolen (1.2 mg version)
- 3. e (demo)
- 4. Silk (live on Time Highway Radio 1996)
- 5. Hatemaster (demo)
- 6. Faculties of the Mind (live at The Last War, December 1999)
- 7. Spoilt (in the end)
- 8. Wet Blanket (demo)
- 9. Jump & Dive (demo)
- 10. Sober (alt. take)
- 11. Sad Sunday Evenin' Blues (New song)
- 12. Epitome (instrumental demo)

=== 2001 – Malayneum (Butterworld/EMI) ===
- 1. Malayneum
- 2. Antidotes
- 3. Pretty Rain
- 4. State of Abyssmal
- 5. Ginseng
- 6. Am I Phoney?
- 7. Mating Season
- 8. Pacific
- 9. No One Else
- 10. Suddenly

=== 2003 – The Best is Yet to Come 1994-20XX (Butterworld/EMI) ===
1. Chrome
2. Nico O'Tynne
3. Wet Blanket
4. Fo
5. Fire Is A Curse?
6. Girl Friday
7. e
8. Vio-Pipe
9. Ruin by the Selling Out
10. Garden City of Light
11. The Chemistry (Between Us)
12. Epitome
13. Doomsday Out
14. Floating in a Vacuum
15. Malayneum
16. Mating Season
17. Antidotes
18. Pendulum ((Unreleased))

=== 2005 – Selamat Tinggal Dunia (Butterworld/EMI) ===
- 1. Ngilu(Hidup makan tidur mati muzik)
- 2. Daulat Tuanku
- 3. Cuai
- 4. Urusan Seri Paduka Baginda
- 5. Selamat Tinggal Dunia
- 6. Kabus Ribut
- 7. Merpati Sejoli
- 8. Hanyut
- 9. Taman Tasik Perdana
- 10. Tentang Tentang
- 11. Kuku Besi (Tidak Dirilis)
- 12. Siaran tergendala (Tidak Dirilis)
- 13. Makan Dalam (Tidak Dirilis)

=== 2008 – Kembali (Butterworld) ===
- 1. Joget Global
- 2. Bebas
- 3. Maharani
- 4. Terus Terang
- 5. Air Liur di Kuala Lumpur
- 6. Lengkap Semula
- 7. Merdeka
- 8. 1000 Tahun (mahu hidup)
- 9. Gelombang Cinta
- 10. Mendaki Menara Condong
- 11. Mati Hidup Kembali

=== VCD ===
- Peristiwa Batu Keras, Live @ Hard Rock Cafe
- Rock the World III – "Tentang-tentang"
- Rock the World IV – "Merpati Sejoli"

=== Special Release/Live album ===
- The Butterfingers' Made For JAPAN Release 2004 Butterworld/EMI
- "Peristiwa Batu Keras" Live CD/VCD 2006 Butterworld/EMI

=== Music Videos ===
- "Mati Hidup Kembali" – 2009
- "Bebas" – 2009
- "Merdeka" – 2008
- "Kembali" – 2008 (Single)
- "Cuai – Live" – 2004 (Unreleased Video – only through fan site)
- "Vio-Pipe" – 2004 (Unreleased Video – only through fan site)
- "Ngilu" – 2004
- "Kabus Ribut" – 2004
- "Malayneum" – 2001
- "Girl Friday" – 1997
- "Chrome" – 1996
- "Nicc O'Tynne" – 1996

=== Hit songs ===
- Naive Sick Chasm from the album 1.2 Milligrams
- Chrome from the album 1.2 Milligrams
- Royal Jelly from the album 1.2 Milligrams
- Nicc O'Tynne from the album 1.2 Milligrams
- Me from the album 1.2 Milligrams
- Fire is a Curse? from the album Butter Worth Pushful
- Stolen from the album Butter Worth Pushful
- Ruin by the Selling Out from the album Butter Worth Pushful
- Girl Friday from the album Butter Worth Pushful
- Delirium from the album Butter Worth Pushful
- Vio-pipe from the album Butter Worth Pushful
- The Chemistry (between us) from the album Transcendence
- Faculties of the Mind from the album Transcendence
- Epitome from the album Transcendence
- Weird from the album Transcendence
- Malayneum from the album Malayneum
- Pacific from the album Malayneum
- Mating Season from the album Malayneum
- Pretty Rain from the album Malayneum
- Cuai from the album Selamat Tinggal Dunia
- Kabus Ribut from the album Selamat Tinggal Dunia
- 1000 tahun (mahu hidup) from the album Kembali
- Terus Terang from the album Kembali
- Bebas from the album Kembali
