= Slapshock =

Filipino heavy metal band

- Origin: Quezon City, Metro Manila, Philippines
- Genres: Heavy metal; metalcore; alternative metal; nu metal (early); rap metal (early)
- Years active: 1996–2020
- Labels: PolyEast; BMBX
- Past members: Jamir Garcia; Lee Nadela; Lean Ansing; Jerry Basco; Chi Evora; Reynold Munsayac
- Website: www.slapshock.com

Slapshock was a Filipino heavy metal band from Metro Manila. They were formed in 1996, originally as a nu metal act, with their early musical style compared to that of Korn. They later shifted towards a metalcore style.

== Background ==
The group was formed on February 14, 1996, by several students at UP Diliman, with original vocalist Reynold Munsayac; he was soon replaced with guitarist Jerry Basco's cousin Jamir Garcia.

Heavily influenced by American East Coast rap, they played in clubs in Manila in the 1990s. Playing in the trenches of pioneering rock clubs Mayric's and Club Dredd, and inciting musical mayhem during college events helped Slapshock grab the audience's attention and the recording industry's.

=== First major deal and 4th Degree Burn ===
The band was signed by EMI Music (Polyeast Records) Philippines in 1998, followed by the release of their first platinum-selling album 4th Degree Burn. This album is the birthplace of many cult-favorite tracks like "Agent Orange" which became the rock anthem of the youth during that time and introduced the band to both the underground and commercial scenes. The song won various accolades including Best Engineered Recording in 13th Awit Awards. The band also won awards in NU Rock Awards 2000 including Best New Artists, Listener's Choice and Music Video of the Year for their song "Agent Orange".

=== Headtrip ===
On January 26, 2001, the band launched their 2nd album "Headtrip" at U.P. Bahay Ng Alumni. the band received nominations at 2001 NU Rock Awards. and the band won Artists of the Year, Listener's Choice and Bassist of the Year for Lee Nadela at 2001 Nu Rock Awards.

=== Project 11 41 ===
The band was featured on Rivermaya's first live album, Live and Acoustic, filmed and recorded on May 18, 2002, from the "Double Trouble: Akoustik Rampage" concert held at the Music Museum, Greenhills, San Juan.

In 2002, their 3rd platinum-selling disc Project 11-41 (2002). the band won award as "Artists of the Year" at 2002 Nu Rock Awards.

On August 30, 2002, the band performed at Folk Arts Theater and become the first rap metal band to sell out all of 8,000 seats in the venue.

In January 2003, the repackaged album of Project 11:41 was released. it includes a limited bonus AVCD featuring live versions of the song "Bleed", "Anino Mo", "Shezzo Wicked" & "Numb" as well as the music video of the song "Queen Paranoia". also the band were nominated in the 2003 MTV Asia Awards as Favorite Artists: Philippines. The Band also presented the Favorite Rock Act to Linkin Park.

=== Novena ===
The gold record award album "Novena" was released in 2004. with the music video of their hit song “Mistero” featuring the multi awarded film-maker, Lav Diaz. the album won Best Album Packaging in 2004 NU Rock Awards. and won Best Album Packaging in the 18th Awit Awards in 2005.

=== Silence ===
Following the most awaited album "Silence" 2006 with their hit single “Direction” which was a huge hit penetrating new and younger audience. and the song "Adios" was used as a theme song for the new E-games "Supreme Destiny".

=== Recollection. Dubai Rock Fest and the formation of Project EAR ===
On December 12, 2007, Slapshock released their second compilation album, "Recollection", a collection of their greatest hits and includes a new track, "Sigaw" (Shout).

The band also received the distinction of being the first Filipino, and Asian band for that matter, to play at the Dubai Desert Rock Festival on March 7, 2008. They shared the stage with rock heavyweights Korn, Killswitch Engage, Velvet Revolver, As I Lay Dying, Machine Head and Muse at this most prestigious annual rock event in the Middle East.

Slapshock also became as one of the founding members of the Asian super group PROJECT E.A.R. (East Asian Revolution) The latter is a collaboration of top artists from Malaysia, Indonesia, Thailand and Singapore, which debuted during the 2009 MTV Asian Music Awards.

=== Cariño Brutal ===
The critically acclaimed album Cariño Brutal (2009). They made music videos for their second single, "Like Eskimo", as well as "Cariño Brutal" from their 2009 album of the same title. The latter's single of the same name went on to become 2010's biggest rock hit. and the band won as Rock Artists Of The Year at the 2nd PMPC Music Award in 2010.

In 2010, another feat for the band happened when they were handpicked by the Macau Cultural Center to once again represent the Philippines at the MACAU Hush Music Fest in November 2010. They were also the guest VJ artist of MYX for the month of August 2010.

On February 13, 2010, the band along with Valley of Chrome Opened for the American Heavy Metal Band Trivium in their concert in A-Venue Events Hall, Makati.

=== Kinse Kalibre ===
Their seventh studio album "Kinse Kalibre", was released in 2011, with its lead single '"Ngayon Na", which topped the Myx Daily Top 10 for three straight weeks. Their second single for the album was a hard rock song called “Langit” (Heaven). the album won Best Album Package on the 25th Awit Awards in 2012.

That same year Slapshock opened for Deftones (February 2011), and Korn (August 2011) when they played in Manila. The band also shared the stage with names in metal like Death Angel, Sepultura, Shadows Fall, The Darkest Hour, Trivium, Lamb of God, Megadeth, Cradle of Filth, Lacuna Coil, The Word Alive and Testament. They played with other Asian artists from Beijing, Hong Kong, Kuala Lumpur and New Delhi. They were also chosen to open for Avenged Sevenfold in Araneta Coliseum a year after in 2012.

On July 31, 2013, the band opened for American Metal band Killswitch Engage on their Concert on Skydome, SM North Edsa.

Slapshock was the representative of the Philippines in 2014 Music Matters in Clarke Quay, Singapore.

Slapshock also holds the most magazine front cover of Pulp Magazine.

=== International Record Deal & Night Owls ===
In 2013, they signed with apl.de.ap's label BMBX Entertainment and will head out to the United States to record their next album to be released, tentatively, in the first quarter of 2014. On April 7, 2014, they released a single "Night Owls". from their upcoming album. on April 26, 2014, their new album "Night Owls" was released. all recorded, mixed and mastered in Los Angeles, California. It was produced by Apl.de.Ap (Black Eyed Peas) and Shavo Odadjian (System of A Down) and mixed by big names in the recording industry like Ben Grosse and Terry Date.

In January 2014, Slapshock released their single "Unshakeable" featuring Pop Shuvit Guitarist JD Wong as a tribute for the Typhoon Haiyan Victims.

=== 20th Year Anniversary “ATAKE” (Final Studio Album) ===
The band just reached a milestone in their career as they are celebrating their 20th Anniversary in 2017, On May 16, 2017, the band released a Music Video of the carrier single "Atake". from their upcoming album. on November 11, 2017, their 9th studio album entitled, ATAKE was released with 10 new tracks, under their own label Alley Road Records. On November 22, 2017, the band released their 2nd single "Luha". the third single "Lason" Music video was released on July 16, 2018. On the same year, the band fourth single "Bandera" was used as a theme song for an upcoming indie fighting video game Bayani: Fighting Game, and a music video was released on April 15. 2019. on September 13, 2019, the band released their fifth and final single "Sinungaling". On 2018, the band announced an Australia tour to promote the album.

=== Last Active Year, 2019 — 2020 ===
In July 2019, the band announced a Canada Tour to promote their latest album.

Slapshock was considered as one of the highest paid rock + metal band in the Philippines, actively toured all over the country from 1999 - 2020, and to North America, Middle East, Australia and Asia.

They were also the Philippines’ representative to Bay Beats Music Festival in Esplanade, Singapore and played for Filipino fans in Yes 24 Live Hall, Seoul, South Korea in 2019.

Slapshock played their last public performance at UP Fair Diliman on February 10, 2020. also the band announced that they are currently working on their new album.

The band was the headliner and brand ambassador of the longest Rock Band competition in the country, Red Horse Beer Pambansang Muziklaban, they were also endorsers of Dickies and Macbeth Footwear Philippines, Sennheiser, Schecter Guitars, Sabian, Cleartone Strings and D&D Custom Guitars

On May 10, 2020, The band released a single "Sana Pag Gising". a song about hope amid COVID-19 crisis.

On August 29, 2020, the band released a cover version of Sylvia La Torre's famous kundiman, "Cariñosa" as a part of rock n collab sponsored by Red Horse Beer.

=== Official disbandment and Jamir Garcia's death ===
In October 2020, the band's bassist Lee Nadela announced to the public that the band had broken up.

The reason for disbandment was Slapshock lead singer Jamir Garcia being accused of unauthorized cash withdrawals from the band's royalties from digital sales of songs, as well as misappropriation of talent fees belonging to Slapshock guitarist Jerry Basco, which both led to the band's breakup and a lawsuit filed.

On November 26, 2020, a month after their disbandment, vocalist Jamir Garcia was found dead in his home due to suicide by hanging.

=== Aftermath ===
On January 22, 2021, Project EAR released a music video for "Dark Times". the last song recorded by the band with the late Slapshock frontman Jamir Garcia.

On August 20, 2021, Rico Blanco & Balcony Entertainment will produce Jamir Garcia posthumous solo album. and the first single "Paraiso" was released on September 5, 2021.

In late 2021, two former Slapshock members Lean Ansing & Chi Evora formed a new band called "Chelsea Alley". with new members Ariel Lumanlan on guitars and John Borja on vocals. the band released their debut single "Heneral' on December 25, 2021. as a tribute for their former bandmate Jamir Garcia. a music video was released on April 25, 2022

On February 14, 2022, former Slapshock member Chi Evora and Lean Ansing along Jeffrey Tam pay tribute to Jamir Garcia in ‘Wala Ka Na’ music video, it also honours other late Filipino musicians, including rapper D-Coy and singer April Boy Regino.

On March 28, 2022, Project Ear along with Greyhoundz's Reg Rubio, Ian Tayao of Wilabaliw, and two former Slapshock members Lean Ansing and Chi Evora released the single "Fade to Black". As a tribute for the late slapshock frontman "Jamir Garcia". and D-Coy.

On September 5, 2022, Balcony Entertainment announced 2nd single from Jamir Garcia entitled "Di Maipaliwanag" .

On August 12, 2023, Chelsea Alley announced on their social media accounts a birthday celebration event on September 5, 2023 in Social House, Makati to commemorate the legacy of Jamir Garcia, and to have listening party to 4 unreleased songs that they made before Jamir's untimely death in November 2020. With official streaming release on September 7, 2023.

== Members ==
Final line-up

- Jamir Garcia – lead vocals (1997–2020; died 2020)
- Lee Nadela – bass (1996–2020)
- Lean Ansing – lead guitar (1996–2020)
- Jerry Basco – rhythm guitar, backing vocals (1996–2009, 2013–2020)
- Chi Evora – drums (1996–2020)

Former member(s)

- Reynold Munsayac - lead vocals (1996–1997)

== Discography ==
=== Studio albums ===
- 4th Degree Burn (1999)
- Headtrip (2001)
- Project 11-41 (2002)
- Novena (2004)
- Silence (2006)
- Kinse Kalibre (2011)
- Atake (2017)

=== Compilation albums ===
- Back to the 2 Inch (2003)
- Recollection (2007)

=== Extended plays ===
- Cariño Brutal (2009)
- Night Owls (2014)

=== Singles/music videos ===
- "Agent Orange"
- "Evil Clown"
- "Madapaka"
- "Get Away"
- "Shezzo Wicked"
- "Numb"
- "Wake Up"
- "Queen Paranoia"
- "Anino Mo"
- "We Are One"
- "Misterio"
- "Miles Away"
- "Direction"
- "Waiting"
- "Adios"
- "Stranded"
- "Sigaw"
- "Cariño Brutal"
- "Like Eskimo"
- "Ngayon Na"
- "Langit"
- "Salamin"
- "Unshakable"
- "Night Owls"
- "The Crown"
- "Turn Back Time"
- "Atake"
- "Luha"
- "Lason"
- "Bandera"

== Awards and nominations ==
Year	Award giving body	Category	Nominated work	Results
2000	Awit Awards	Best Engineered Recording	"Agent Orange"	Won
2000	NU Rock Awards	Best New Artist	—N/a	Won
2000	NU Rock Awards	Listener's Choice	—N/a	Won
2000	NU Rock Awards	Rock Video of the Year	"Agent Orange"	Won
2000	NU Rock Awards	Song of the Year	"Evil Clown & Agent Orange"	Nominated
2000	NU Rock Awards	Album of the Year	"4th Degree Burn"	Nominated
2000	NU Rock Awards	Best Album Packaging	"4th Degree Burn"	Nominated
2000	NU Rock Awards	Artist of the Year	—N/a	Nominated
2000	NU Rock Awards	Vocalist of the Year	(for Jamir Garcia)	Nominated
2000	NU Rock Awards	Guitarist of the Year	(for Jerry Basco & Lean Ansing)	Nominated
2000	NU Rock Awards	Bassist of the Year	(for Lee Nadela)	Nominated
2000	NU Rock Awards	Drummer of the Year	(for Chi Evora)	Nominated
2001	NU Rock Awards	Artist of The Year	—N/a	Won
2001	NU Rock Awards	Bassist of the Year	(for Lee Nadela)	Won
2001	NU Rock Awards	Listener's Choice	—N/a	Won
2001	NU Rock Awards	Song Of the Year	"Get Away"	Nominated
2001	NU Rock Awards	Album of the Year	Headtrip	Nominated
2001	NU Rock Awards	Best Music Video	"Get Away"	Nominated
2001	NU Rock Awards	Best Album Packaging	Headtrip	Nominated
2001	NU Rock Awards	Vocalist of the Year	(for Jamir Garcia)	Nominated
2001	NU Rock Awards	Guitarist of the Year	(for Jerry Basco & Lean Ansing)	Nominated
2001	NU Rock Awards	Drummer of the Year	(for Chi Evora)	Nominated
2001	MTV Pilipinas Music Award	Favorite New Artist in a Video	"Agent Orange"	Nominated
2001	MTV Pilipinas Music Award	Favorite Group Video	"Agent Orange"	Nominated
2001	MTV Pilipinas Music Award	Favorite Song	"Agent Orange"	Nominated
2002	NU Rock Awards	Artist of The Year	—N/a	Won
2002	NU Rock Awards	Song Of the Year	"Numb"	Nominated
2002	NU Rock Awards	Best Rock Video Of the Year	"Numb"	Nominated
2002	NU Rock Awards	Best Album Packaging	"Project 11:41"	Nominated
2002	NU Rock Awards	Vocalist of the Year	(for Jamir Garcia)	Nominated
2002	NU Rock Awards	Guitarist of the Year	(for Jerry Basco & Lean Ansing)	Nominated
2002	NU Rock Awards	Bassist of the Year	(for Lee Nadela)	Nominated
2002	NU Rock Awards	Drummer of the Year	(for Chi Evora)	Nominated
2003	MTV Asia Awards	Favorite Artist: Philippines	—N/a	Nominated
2003	MTV Pilipinas Music Award	Best Director	Team Manila for "Numb"	Won
2003	MTV Pilipinas Music Award	Favorite Group	"Numb"	Nominated
2003	MTV Pilipinas Music Award	Best Video	"Numb"	Nominated
2004	NU Rock Awards	Best Album Packaging	Novena	Won
2004	NU Rock Awards	Bassists of the Year	(for Lee Nadela)	Nominated
2005	18th Awit Awards	Best Album Packaging	Novena	Won
2007	MYX Music Awards	Favorite MYX Live Performance	—N/a	Nominated
2007	20th Awit Awards	Best Album Package	"Silence"	Nominated
2010	2nd PMPC Star Awards for Music	Rock Album of the Year	"Cariño Brutal"	Nominated
2010	2nd PMPC Star Awards for Music	Rock Artists Of The Year	(for "Cariño Brutal" album)	Won
2011	Myx Music Awards 2011	Favorite Song	"Cariño Brutal"	Nominated
2011	Myx Music Awards 2011	Favorite Group	—N/a	Nominated
2011	Myx Music Awards 2011	Favorite MYX Live Performance	—N/a	Won
2012	Myx Music Awards 2012	Favorite Rock Video	"Ngayon Na"	Nominated
2012	Myx Music Awards 2012	Favorite Group	—N/a	Nominated
2012	25th Awit Awards	Best Album Package	Kinse Kalibre	Won
2012	25th Awit Awards	Best Performance by a Group of Recording Artists	"Ngayon Na"	Nominated
2012	4th PMPC Star Awards for Music	Rock Album of the Year	"Kinse Kalibre"	Nominated
2012	4th PMPC Star Awards for Music	Male Rock Artists Of The Year	—N/a	Nominated
2014	Yahoo Celebrity Awards	Band of the Year	—N/a	Nominated
2015	Myx Music Awards 2015	Favorite Rock Video	"Unshakeable"	Nominated
2015	Myx Music Awards 2015	Favorite Group	—N/a	Nominated
2016	Myx Music Awards 2016	Favorite Group	—N/a	Nominated

Awards
Preceded by Sandwich	NU Rock Awards; Best New Artist; 2000	Succeeded by Itchyworms
