= Project E.A.R. =

Southeast Asian music supergroup

Project E.A.R. (East Asian Revolution) is a supergroup of bands and artists from Southeast Asia. It is a collaboration of bands from five countries in Southeast Asia which include Ahli Fiqir from Singapore, Pop Shuvit from Malaysia, Saint Loco from Indonesia, Thaitanium and Silksounds both from Thailand and Slapshock of the Philippines. Also joining from Thailand is M.E.M.

They debuted at MTV Asia 2008 where they performed their song "Marabahaya", which means "danger" in Malaysian and Indonesian.

== Collaborators ==
- Singapore

Ahli Fiqir represented Singapore with Daly as collaborating artist for the project. He introduced his fast and swift rapping music genre merging the art of rhyming in the Malay language with the modern hip hop beats. Ahli Fiqir plays important role in introducing Singapore's unique music culture.

- Malaysia

A nominee in the 2008 MTV Asia Awards, Pop Shuvit represented Malaysia. Formed in 2001, the band has been known for their blend of hip hop and rock. The band served as front act for My Chemical Romance's concerts across Malaysia, Hong Kong and the Philippines.

- Indonesia

Reaping most accolades and awards for their debut album Rock Upon A Time, Indonesia's Saint Loco is the most popular band in their home country. For Project E.A.R, Joe will represent his band contributing his vocals to the performance.

- Thailand

From Thailand, Thaitanium and Silksounds will represent the land of smiles. For Thaitanium, members Kan, Way and Day will represent in the super group together with Dandee from Silksounds.

- Philippines

Slapshock of the Philippines with band members Jamir and Lean contributed their rap metal music genre in the collaboration. The band is among the most popular band in the rock scene in the Philippines.

== Album track ==
1. South East A
2. Marabahaya
3. Hold On
4. No Sleep for the Wicked
