= Mizz Nina discography =

- Studio albums: 2
- Singles: 7
- Music videos: 12
- Promotional singles: 3

This is the discography of Malaysian singer-songwriter Mizz Nina. It consists of two studio albums, seven singles (including one as a featured artist), three promotional singles and twelve music videos (including one as a featured artist).

== Albums ==
=== Studio albums ===
| Title | Album details |
|---|---|
| What You Waiting For | Released: July 17, 2010; Label: Warner Music Malaysia; Formats: CD |
| Takeover | Released: May 26, 2012; Label: YZ International; Formats: CD, digital download |

=== Albums with Teh Tarik Crew ===
- Are We Rap Stars Now (2000)
- How’s The Level? (2004)
- What’s Next? (2007)

== Singles ==
=== As main artist ===
| Year | Title | Album |
|---|---|---|
| 2010 | "What You Waiting For" (featuring Colby O' Donis) | What You Waiting For |
| 2011 | "Takeover" (featuring Flo Rida) | Takeover |
| 2012 | "With You" | Takeover |
| 2012 | "Rentak Yang Sama" | Takeover |
| 2012 | "Summer Burning" | — |
| 2013 | "Around the World" (featuring Jay Park) | — |

=== As featured artist ===
| Year | Title | Album |
|---|---|---|
| 2011 | "Haters Jockin' Me" (Dandee featuring Mizz Nina & Joe Flizzow) | — |

=== Promotional singles ===
| Title | Year | Album |
|---|---|---|
| "Let Me C U Get It" | 2010 | What You Waiting For |
| "Kurnia" (featuring Noh Hujan) | 2010 | What You Waiting For |
| "Get It" (Remix) (featuring Theo Martins & DJ Fuzz) | 2011 | — |

== Music videos ==
| Year | Song title | Director(s) | Video Shoot Location | Link(s) |
|---|---|---|---|---|
| 2009 | Sometime (feat. Dandee) (official music video) | Nam-il Cho | N/A | Vimeo |
| 2010 | What You Waiting For (feat. Colby O' Donis) (official music video) | Scott McCullough | Los Angeles, California | YouTube |
| 2010 | Kurnia (feat. Noh Hujan) (official music video) | Fadzly Tajuddin | Malaysia | YouTube |
| 2011 | Get It (Remix) (feat. Theo Martins & DJ Fuzz) (official music video) | DJ Cza | N/A | YouTube |
| 2011 | Takeover (feat. Flo Rida) (official music video) | Dale Resteghini | Miami, Florida | YouTube |
| 2012 | With You (official music video) | Diffan Sina Norman | Malaysia | YouTube |
| 2012 | Rentak Yang Sama (official music video) | DJ Cza | Malaysia | YouTube |
| 2012 | Summer Burning (official music video) | Amaro Shake | Kuala Lumpur, Malaysia | YouTube |
| 2013 | Haters Jockin' Me (official music video)^{1} | Aaron Man | N/A | YouTube |
| 2013 | Around the World (feat. Jay Park) (official music video) | Nam-il Cho | Seoul, South Korea | YouTube |

^{1}As featured artist.

- This list does not include music video teasers, behind-the-scenes or the-making-of music videos, live acoustic sessions and live performances.
