= Shout! Awards =

Malaysian award show

- Awarded for: Excellence in colouring the entertainment industry
- Country: Malaysia
- Presented by: 8TV
- First award: 17 July 2009
- Final award: 9 November 2012
- Website: www.shoutawards.com.my

The Shout! Awards was an entertainment award show created to celebrate the Malaysian entertainment scene which was said (at the time) had rapidly developed. The award recognised people of music, television, film and radio industry as well as the entertainment industry as a whole.

There were 16 award categories including the biggest title – The Ultimate Shout! Award. The nominees were voted by the public online except for the Ultimate Shout! Award where it was decided by the judges.

== Shout! Awards 2009 ==
The first ever Shout! Awards was held on 17 July 2009 and was aired live on 8TV. The voting started from 8 June and ended on 16 July 2009.

=== Nominees and winners ===
Winners are highlighted in bold.

==== Ultimate Shout! Award ====
- **Bunkface**

==== Music ====
- **Rockstar Award (Rock Awards)**
  - **Bunkface**
  - Butterfingers
  - Estranged (band)
  - Hujan
  - Meet Uncle Hussain
  - Pop Shuvit
- **Popstar Award (Pop Awards)**
  - Aizat
  - Couple
  - Siti Nurhaliza
  - Jaclyn Victor
  - Nikki
  - **Stacy**
- **Power Vocal Award (Powerful Vocals Awards)**
  - Ayu
  - Dato' Siti Nurhaliza
  - Dina
  - **Jaclyn Victor**
  - Lan (Meet Uncle Hussain)
  - Syarul Reza (Love Me Butch)
- **Flava Award (Hip Hop / R&B Awards)**
  - Ahli Fiqir
  - Caprice
  - Jin Hackman
  - **Joe Flizzow**
  - Malique
  - Phlowtron
- **Break Out Award (Best New Act)**
  - **Bunkface**
  - Hujan
  - Joe Flizzow
  - Malique
  - Meet Uncle Hussain
  - Pesawat

==== Television and Film ====
- **Best On Screen Chemistry**
  - Cheryl Samad & Nazrudin Rahman ('Ghost')
  - Syafinaz Selamat & Paul Moss (OIAM2)
  - Vanidah Imran & Afdlin Shauki ('Sepi')
  - Zahiril Adzim & Liyana Jasmay ('KAMI')
  - **Upin Dan Ipin ('Upin & Ipin' – TV series)**
- **Fresh TV Series Award (New TV Series including Dramas and / or Sitcoms)**
  - Field Trip! USA
  - Frontpage
  - **Ghost**
  - Kekasihku Seru
  - Sindarela
- **Breakthrough Film Award**
  - Budak Kelantan @ Kelantan Boys
  - Kala Malam Bulan Mengambang
  - **KAMI**
  - Los Dan Faun
  - Sepi
- **Favorite TV Program (Non Drama)**
  - Destinasi Bajet (Season 2)
  - **Field Trip! USA**
  - Homegrown (Season 3)
  - Majalah 3
  - OIAM 2
- **Favorite TV Host**
  - Daphne Iking ('The Breakfast Show')
  - Marion Caunter (OIAM2)
  - **Nazrudin Rahman ('The Breakfast Show')**
  - Qushairi aka Qi ('Destinasi Bajet Season 2')
  - Qushairi aka Qi ('Field Trip! USA')

==== Radio ====
- **Coolest Radio Announcer**
  - Fara Fauzana
  - Hunny Madu
  - **JJ**
  - Phat Fabes
  - Rudy
- **Favorite Radio Show**
  - Fly FM Must Have Music (Hunny Madu)
  - Fly FM Night Flight (Basil & Hafiz)
  - **Fly FM Pagi Show (Ben, Nadia & Phat Fabes)**
  - Hot FM AM Show (Fara Fauzana & Faizal Ismail)
  - Indie X (Smek & Mat)

==== The Works ====
- **Stylo Award (Most Stylish Awards)**
  - **Dynas Mokhtar**
  - Faizal Tahir
  - Marion Caunter
  - Maya Karin
  - Sazzy Falak
- **Hot Chick Award**
  - Andrea Fonseka
  - Daphne Iking
  - Fazura
  - **Marion Caunter**
  - Marsha
- **Hot Guy Award**
  - **Faizal Tahir**
  - Jonathan Putra (JP)
  - Tony Eusoff
  - Zahiril Adzim
  - Zizan Nin

== Shout! Awards 2010 ==
The second edition of Shout! Awards was held on 20 November 2010 at Putra Stadium, Bukit Jalil, Kuala Lumpur. Like the previous year, the award was aired live on 8TV. The voting session started on 18 October 2010 and ended on 20 November 2010. Xpax, Celcom's brand for prepaid mobile services which is also a sponsor for the edition, also introduced a new award called Mobile Artist of The Year Award.

During that night, then-newcomer singer-songwriter, Yuna was awarded the Ultimate Shout! Award, an award given to the artist who had created a scene or phenomena in the entertainment industries. The award was presented to her by the 2009's recipient, Bunkface.

Besides being awarded with the highest recognition, Yuna also won another two awards, Popstar Award (Pop Award) as well as Break Out Award (Best New Act); making her the biggest winner on that night with three awards in total. She was then followed by local indie band, Bunkface who picked up two awards; Rockstar Award (Rock Award) and Music Video Award (Best Music Video) for 'Prom Queen'.

=== Nominees and winners ===
Winners are highlighted in bold.

==== Ultimate Shout! Award ====
- **Yuna**

==== Music ====
- **Rockstar Award (Rock Awards)**
  - Azlan & the Typewriter
  - **Bunkface**
  - Faizal Tahir
  - Hujan
  - Meet Uncle Hussain
  - Pop Shuvit
- **Popstar Award (Pop Awards)**
  - Aizat
  - Dato' Siti Nurhaliza & Krisdayanti
  - Jaclyn Victor
  - Mizz Nina
  - **Yuna**
  - Zee Avi
- **Power Vocal Award (Powerful Vocals Awards)**
  - Azlan & the Typewriter
  - Black
  - Dato' Siti Nurhaliza & Krisdayanti
  - **Faizal Tahir**
  - Jaclyn Victor
  - Rithan (Deja VooDoo Spells)
- **Flava Award (Hip Hop / R&B Awards)**
  - Altimet
  - DJ Fuzz & Malique
  - Joe Flizzow
  - Malique
  - **Mizz Nina**
  - Sonaone
- **Music Video Award (Best Music Video)**
  - **Prom Queen by Bunkface**
  - Osaka by Disagree
  - Do It, Duit by Joe Flizzow
  - Mirage by Pesawat
  - Marabahaya by Project E.A.R
  - Cinta Kosmik by The Fabulous Cats
- **Break Out Award (Best New Act)**
  - Azlan & The Typewriter
  - Black
  - Mizz Nina
  - Monoloque
  - **Yuna**
  - Zee Avi
- **Mobile Artist of the Year Award**
  - **Khatimah Cinta by 6ixth Sense**
  - Menatap Matamu (Chorus) by Aril
  - Tinggal Kenangan by Saleem
  - Dan Sebenarnya (WkndSessions) by Yuna
  - Cukup Indah by Alif Satar

==== Television and Film ====
- **Best On Screen Chemistry**
  - **Afdlin Shauki & Liyana Jasmay (Papadom)**
  - Upin & Ipin (Upin & Ipin)
  - Remy Ishak & Tiz Zaqyah (Nur Kasih)
  - Farid Kamil & Lisa Surihani (Lagenda Budak Setan)
  - Wakakaka Crew & Giler Battle Crew (Showdown 2010)
  - Afdlin Shauki & Rashidi Ishak (Setem)
- **Fresh TV Series Award (New TV Series including Dramas and / or Sitcoms)**
  - Adamaya
  - Arjuna
  - Blogger Boy
  - Gelora Di Hati Sara
  - **Nur Kasih**
  - Qalesya
- **Breakthrough Feature Award**
  - Cuci The Musical
  - Geng : Pengembaraan Bermula
  - **Lagenda Budak Setan**
  - Papadom
  - Pisau Cukur
  - Setem
- **Favorite TV Program (Non Drama)**
  - Imam Muda
  - One In A Million Year 3
  - Melodi
  - Raja Lawak 4
  - Anugerah Juara Lagu 24
  - **Showdown 2010**
- **Favorite TV Personality Award**
  - Ally Iskandar (Anugerah Juara Lagu 24)
  - Awal Ashaari (Fuhhh!)
  - Aznil Haji Nawawi (Jangan Lupa Lirik)
  - Daphne Iking (The Breakfast Show)
  - Henry Golding (The Quickie)
  - **Zizan Raja Lawak (Raja Lawak 4)**

==== Radio ====
- **Coolest Radio Announcer Award**
  - Faizal Ismail (HotFM AM Krew)
  - Hafiz Hatim (FlyFM's Night Flight)
  - Jeremy Teo (RedFM Evenings)
  - Hunny Madu (FlyFM Campur Chart)
  - Fara Fauzana (HotFM AM Krew)
  - **Phat Fabes (FlyFM Pagi Show)**
- **Favorite Radio Show Award**
  - Malaysia's Hottest Music ~ 10@10 (Hunny Madu)
  - FlyFM Pagi Show (Phabes, Ben & Nadia)
  - The Red FM Breakfast Show with JD & Dilly (JD & Dilly)
  - FlyFM Campur Chart (Hunny Madu)
  - **HotFM AM Krew (Fara Fauzana, Faizal Ismail & AG)**
  - FlyFM's Rush Hour (Jules & Prem)

==== The Works ====
- **Hot Chick Award**
  - Maya Karin
  - Mizz Nina
  - Nora Danish
  - Nur Fazura
  - **Scha Alyahya**
  - Vanidah Imran
- **Hot Guy Award**
  - Faizal Tahir
  - Farid Kamil
  - Hans Isaac
  - **Henry Golding (8TV Quickie)**
  - Remy Ishak
  - Shaheizy Sam

== Shout! Awards 2012 ==
The third and last known edition of Shout! Awards was held on 23 November 2012 at the Surf Beach at Sunway Lagoon, Bandar Sunway, Petaling Jaya, Selangor. The original date was 24 November 2012; the new date was made in September 2012. This is the first time Shout Awards was held in an open place Nominees for the edition was announced on 19 October 2012 while the votings was started on 22 October 2012. The edition was aired live on 8TV and repeated the next day on TV9 at 10:30 pm.

The edition introduced two new awards, both of them are related to social media and placed in the Social Media category. The Shout! Aloud Award is given to Malaysians who contribute content to the social media such as vlogs while the Wired Celebrity Award is given to Malaysian celebrities who have become popular through the social media.

=== Nominees and winners ===
Winners are highlighted in bold.

==== Ultimate Shout! Award ====
- **KRU**

==== Music ====
- **Rockstar Award (Rock Awards)**
  - **Bunkface**
  - Estranged
  - Faizal Tahir
  - Hujan
  - Love Me Butch
  - Monoloque
- **Popstar Award (Pop Awards)**
  - Aizat
  - Dato' Siti Nurhaliza
  - Hafiz
  - Jaclyn Victor
  - Najwa
  - **Yuna**
- **Power Vocal Award (Powerful Vocals Awards)**
  - Azlan & the Typewriter
  - Black
  - Faizal Tahir
  - Jaclyn Victor
  - **Shila Amzah**
  - Yuna
- **Flava Award (Hip Hop / R&B Awards)**
  - Altimet, Joe Flizzow and Sonaone
  - **Black ft Malique**
  - Malique ft Jamal Abdillah
  - Malique and Rabbani
  - Mizz Nina
  - Zizan and Kaka
- **Break Out Award (Best New Act)**
  - Diandra Arjunaidi
  - Go Gerila!
  - Kyoto Protocol
  - **Massacre Conspiracy**
  - Najwa
  - Oh! Chentaku
- **Music Video Award (Best Music Video)**
  - **With You by Mizz Nina**
  - Got to Go by Najwa
  - Carilah Duit by One Buck Short
  - Deja Vu by Shila Amzah
  - Livin' Rock and Roll by The Azenders
  - Terukir di Bintang by Yuna

==== Television and Film ====
- **Best On Screen Chemistry**
  - Awie, Johan and Usop Wilcha (SHY8) (Hantu Kak Limah Balik Rumah)
  - Zizan Razak and Aaron Aziz (KL Gangster)
  - Remy Ishak and Tiz Zaqyah (Nur Kasih The Movie)
  - Aaron Aziz and Maya Karin (Ombak Rindu)
  - Josiah Hogan and Iedil Putra (Projek Pop)
  - **Johan and Zizan Razak (Raja Lawak Musim 6)**
- **Fresh TV Series Award (New TV Series including Dramas and / or Sitcoms)**
  - Betul Ke Bohong?
  - Friday I'm In Love
  - Projek Pop
  - Tentang Dhia
  - **Versus**
  - Yuna – Bintang Di Langit
- **Favorite TV Program (Non Drama)**
  - Anugerah Juara Lagu Ke-26
  - Karoot Komedia X (Raya)
  - Maharaja Lawak Mega (Final)
  - **Showdown 2012**
  - Super Spontan
  - Versus – Konfrontasi Terakhir
- **Breakthrough Local Feature Award**
  - Bunohan
  - Hantu Kak Limah Balik Rumah
  - Hikayat Merong Mahawangsa
  - Nur Kasih The Movie
  - Ombak Rindu
  - **Songlap**
- **Favorite TV Personality Award**
  - Adibah Noor (Super Spontan)
  - Hafiz Hatim (Showdown 2012)
  - Henry Golding (Welcome To The Rail World)
  - Johan (Raja Lawak 6)
  - Razif Hashim (Best In The World)
  - **Zizan Razak (Raja Lawak 6)**

==== Radio ====
- **Coolest Radio Announcer Award**
  - Faizal Ismail (HotFM AM Krew)
  - Fara Fauzana (HotFM AM Krew)
  - Hafiz Hatim (FlyFM's Pagi Rock Crew)
  - **Hunny Madu (FlyFM Malaysia's Hottest Music)**
  - Nabil Ahmad (Suria FM's Ceria Pagi di Suria)
  - Phat Fabes (FlyFM's The Phat Fabes and Ben Show)
- **Favorite Radio Show Award**
  - 33RPM
  - Dansa Era Bersama Nazpoleon, G dan DJ Fuzz
  - Fly FM Stripped
  - Fly FM Pagi Rock Crew
  - Fly FM The Phat Fabes & Ben Show
  - **Top 5 Panggilan Hangit-Fara, AG, FBI**

==== The Works ====
- **Hot Guy Award**
  - **Aaron Aziz**
  - Hans Isaac
  - Henry Golding
  - Remy Ishak
  - Shaheizy Sam
  - Zizan Razak
- **Hot Chick Award**
  - Nur Fazura
  - Lisa Surihani
  - Marion Rose Counter
  - Maya Karin
  - **Nora Danish**
  - Scha Alyahya

==== Social media ====
- **Shout! Aloud Award**
  - Faradyable
  - IniAnwarHadi
  - JinnyboyTV
  - **Matluthfi90**
  - Popteevee
  - The WKND
- **Wired Celebrity Award**
  - AG Coco
  - Altimet
  - Celepets
  - Fatimah Abu Bakar
  - Sofia Jane
  - **Yuna**
