= Mizz Nina =

- Born: Shazrina binti Azman; 1 July 1980 (age 46); Kuala Lumpur, Malaysia
- Occupations: Fashion designer; motivational speaker; television personality; humanitarian
- Spouses: Noh Salleh (m. 2011; div. 2022) Essam Muhammad (m. 2023)
- Relatives: Azman Hashim; (father)
- Musical career
- Genres: Pop; R&B; dance-pop; hip-hop
- Instruments: Vocals; drums; piano
- Years active: 2000–2013
- Label: Mizz Nina Productions

Shazrina binti Azman, also known as Mizz Nina, (born 1 July 1980) is a Malaysian fashion designer, motivational speaker, television personality, humanitarian, and co-founder of Dopstv, an Islamic lifestyle channel. She first gained renown as a musician, singer-songwriter, rapper, and dancer, but has since retired to focus on her fashion career and humanitarian work.

In 2016, Mizz Nina and her two partners founded the Islamic lifestyle channel DOPS (Deen of Peace Studios) TV Sdn Bhd which has produced a number of TV series and talk shows. She is also involved with organizations that assist the underprivileged, including Cinta Syria Malaysia, 1moment4them, Possible Dreams International, Feeding The Needy, Miasa, and Into Taqwa Malaysia.

== Career ==
She is the daughter of Azman Hashim, who is the Chairman of AmBank Group.

=== 1999–2007: Teh Tarik Crew ===
This group consists of several main members who are Santesh, Berg (UMP), Epi, and Amar (FKP). In 1997, she formed First Born Troopz with Fiquetional, with whom she would co-found the seminal Malaysian hip-hop group, the Teh Tarik Crew in 1999. The group's full-length album, How’s The Level? received two AIM nominations in 2002. By 2004, Mizz Nina had earned two more AIM nominations through the Teh Tarik Crew's sophomore album, What’s Next?. The group later disbanded in 2007 to pursue solo careers.

=== 2007–2013: Going solo ===
In July 2010, Mizz Nina released her first solo album, What You Waiting For. She collaborated with 3 international singers, including Theo Martins on the song "Let Me C U Get It", Colby O' Donis on "What You Waiting For", and Grammy nominee Planet Asia on the song "Hope". Mizz Nina toured to Sri Lanka and India to promote her greatest hit "What You Waiting For".

In February 2012, she released a new single called "With You". A lyric video of the song was released onto YouTube, which had earned over 6,000 views on its debut week and reached 40,000 views within 3 weeks. Three months later, she released her second solo album called Takeover. In September of the same year, she released her latest single called "Summer Burning" which was produced by DJ Poet Name Life and written by Jamie Munson, Lucy McIntosh and Mizz Nina herself. Mizz Nina had also teamed up with the American rapper Flo Rida on a song called "Takeover". The music video, filmed in Miami, became a YouTube hit at the time earning 1,505,221 views on YouTube.

In February 2013, Mizz Nina released the single, Around The World which featured Korean-American superstar, Jay Park. The single was produced by Cha Cha Malone. On 26 March 2013, she released the music video for Around The World on her official YouTube channel, mizznina1780. The music video was filmed in December 2012 in Korea with Jay Park. At the time, the CD single for Around The World was gifted free of charge to customers who made purchases at her Mizz Demeanor shop.

While touring the US to promote her new single with Flo Rida titled Takeover in 2012, she was given the opportunity to host The MTV Iggy Show — Episode 12 live in Times Square, New York City. The episode aimed to expose innocent bystanders to three new artists breaking out around the globe, such as raw rock from Mexico's Le Butcherettes, wavy hip-hop from American emcee Robert Raimon Roy, and the Swedish strains of First Aid Kit's viral country. Mizz Nina recalls this as "an experience I will never forget".

==== Concerts and Live Performances ====
Mizz Nina was invited to perform for numerous concert events, such as, MTV World Stage 2012, Watsons Music Festival 2012, Twin Towers Alive 2011 and 2013, Bella Awards, and Arthur's Day 2011. On 1 December 2011, she was one of the opening acts for Pitbull live In Malaysia. She also travelled to Melbourne in October 2012 to perform and launch her TakeOver album. On 18 May 2013, she held her first concert in Kuala Lumpur at the KL Live, Life Centre.

=== 2011–2022: Marriage and subsequent retirement as singer ===
Mizz Nina was married to Noh Salleh, a vocalist for the indie rock band Hujan. Their wedding was held at her family's former residence near Ukay Heights, Ampang on 1 July 2011. She performed Hajj with Noh in 2013. Following her return from the pilgrimage, Mizz Nina appeared to embody a more modest image which came as a surprise to reporters and netizens who had grown accustomed to her pop singer persona. It was during this period where she announced her retirement from singing to focus on her production and fashion aspirations, in addition to her newfound passion for her Muslim faith. Mizz Nina and Noh Salleh announced on Instagram that they would be separating in August 2022.

Since retiring, Mizz Nina is known to provide services as a vocal coach. She was once seen coaching students at the Singing Shop Studio in Amcorp Mall.

== Business ==
=== Fashion label ===
Mizz Nina is a fashion designer for her own women's fashion label called Mizz Demeanor and Madeena Clothing. In 2014, Mizz Nina organized a World Hijab Day workshop with the latter company MaDeena on 1 February at Amcorp Mall, Petaling Jaya.

=== Production ===
Through her production company, Big Fish Entertainment, Mizz Nina produced a 13-episode children's program called The Cici & Caca Show.

== Other appearances ==
=== As host ===
| Year | Title | |
|---|---|---|
| 2015 | Beyond Translation | Astro Oasis |
| 2016 | Queen Of The Deen | Astro Oasis |
| 2016 | Into Taqwa With Mizz Nina | TV Alhijrah |
| 2017 | The Mizz Nina Show | Astro Maya HD |

== Discography ==
=== Studio albums ===
- What You Waiting For
- Takeover

== Awards and nominations ==
Anugerah Industri Muzik

Anugerah Industri Muzik (or AIM) (literal English translation: Music Industry Awards), is an annual event similar to that of the Grammy Awards which recognizes Malaysia's finest artists. The year indicates the ceremony year, with the event awarding the works of the previous years.

Anugerah Industri Muzik Malaysia (AIM)
| Year | Category | Nominated Work(s) | Album | Result | Ref. |
|---|---|---|---|---|---|
| 2012 (AIM19) | The Best Album Cover "Kulit Album Terbaik in Malay" | TAKEOVER's Album Cover | Takeover | Won | |
| 2012 (AIM19) | Touring Artist Award "Anugerah Kembara in Malay" | Takeover Tour | Takeover | Won | |
| 2012 (AIM19) | Best Hip Hop Song "Lagu Hip Hop Terbaik in Malay" | Just You and Me | Takeover | Nominated | |

Shout! Awards

The Shout! Awards is an entertainment award show, created to celebrate the Malaysian entertainment scene which is said to have rapidly developed. The award recognizes people of the entertainment industry, such as those in music, television, film, and radio.

Shout! Awards
| Year | Category | Nominated Work(s) | Result |
|---|---|---|---|
| 2010 | Popstar Award (Pop Awards) | | Nominated |
| 2010 | Flava Award (Hip Hop / R&B Awards) | | Won |
| 2010 | Break Out Award (Best New Act) | | Nominated |
| 2010 | Hot Chick Award | | Nominated |
| 2012 | Flava Award (Hip Hop / R&B Awards) | | Nominated |
| 2012 | Music Video Award (Best Music Video) | With You | Won |
| 2013 | Music Video Award (Best Music Video) | Around The World (featuring Jay Park) | Nominated |
| 2013 | Flava Award (Hip Hop / R&B Awards) | | Won |

Anugerah Bintang Popular Berita Harian (Berita Harian's Most Popular Star Awards)

Anugerah Bintang Popular Berita Harian (or ABPBH) is an award ceremony that recognizes the most popular artists of the year. The award is a yearly ceremony organized by a Malaysian newspaper company, Berita Harian. Its results are entirely based on votes cast by readers.

Anugerah Bintang Popular Berita Harian (ABPBH)
| Year | Category | Results |
|---|---|---|
| 2013 (ABPBH 23) | Artis Wanita Stailo | Nominated |
| 2014 (ABPBH 24) | Pasangan Selebriti Romantis (with Noh Salleh) | Nominated |
