= Altimet =

Yang Berhormat Tuan Altimet MLA
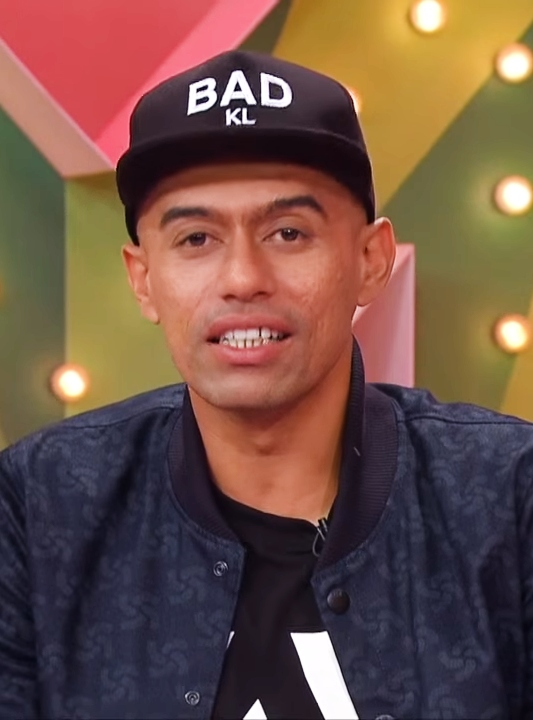
- Altimet on MeleTOP 14 April 2015

Member of the Selangor State Legislative Assembly for Lembah Jaya
- Incumbent
- Assumed office 12 August 2023
- Preceded by: Haniza Mohamed Talha (PH–PKR)
- Majority: 6,678 (2023)

Faction represented in Selangor State Legislative Assembly
- 2023 –: Pakatan Harapan

Personal details
- Born: Syed Ahmad Bin Syed Abdul Rahman Al-Hadad; 27 November 1978 (age 47) Petaling Jaya, Selangor, Malaysia
- Party: People's Justice Party (PKR)
- Other political affiliations: Pakatan Harapan (PH)
- Children: 3
- Education: International Medical University
- Website: najwanhalimi.com

Altimet
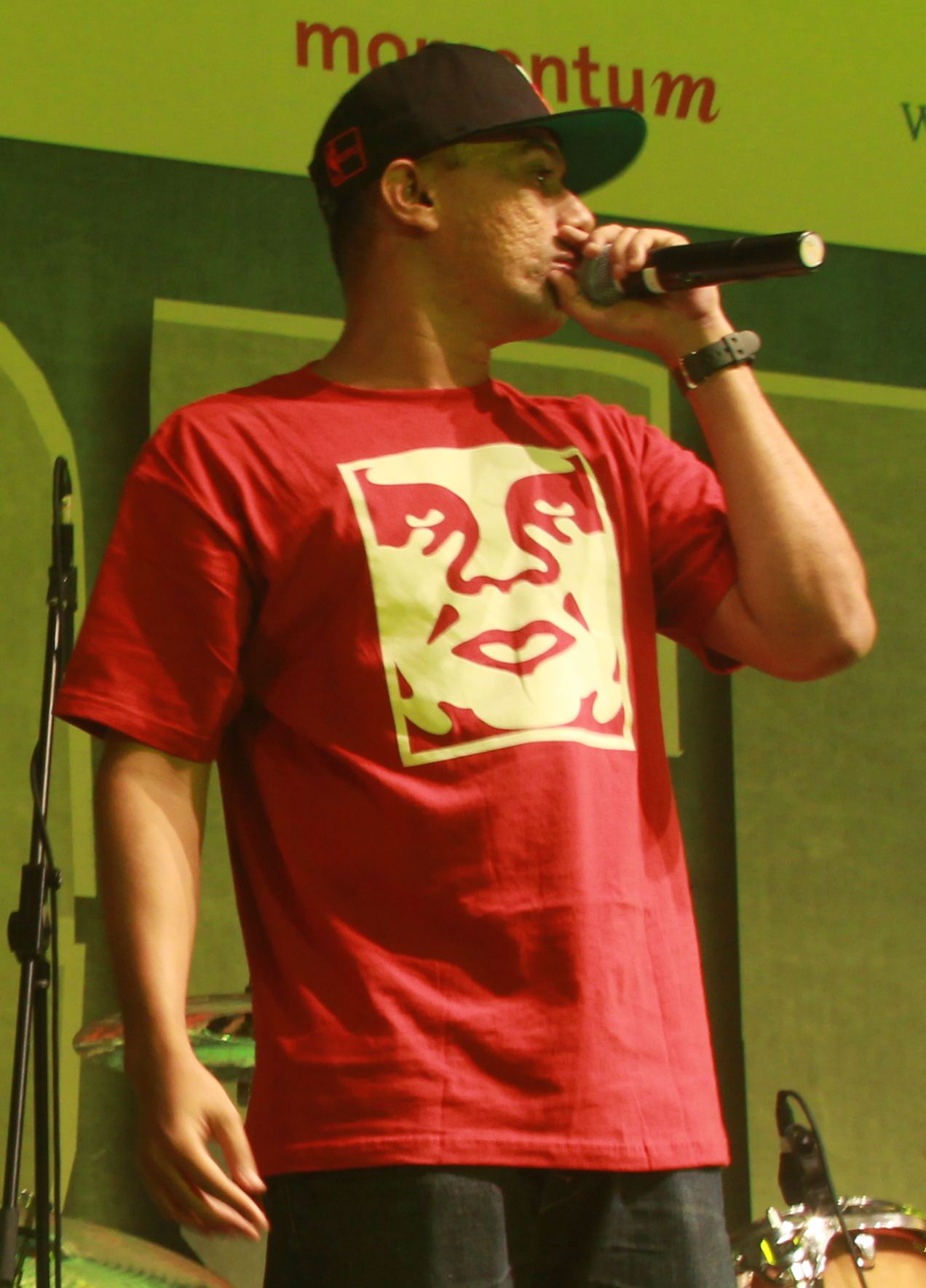
- Altimet performing in 2011

Background information
- Genres: Hip hop, rap
- Occupations: Composer, songwriter, actor
- Years active: 1999–2019 (as singer); 1999–now (as composer and songwriter)
- Label: Kartel Records
- Website: altimet.com.my

Syed Ahmad bin Syed Abdul Rahman Al-Hadad, or, better known online as Altimet, (born 27 November 1978) is a Malaysian politician, composer, lyricist, actor and former singer who has served as Member of the Selangor State Legislative Assembly (MLA) for Lembah Jaya since August 2023. He is a member of the People's Justice Party (PKR), a component party of the Pakatan Harapan (PH) coalition. He was a former member of the Teh Tarik Crew group, which was active between 1999 and 2007.

== Early life ==
Altimet was born on 27 November 1978, in Petaling Jaya, Selangor to Syed Abdul Rahman bin Syed Ali Alhadad and Sharifah Jamalah binti Syed Agil Alsagoff. He received his primary education at Sekolah Kebangsaan Subang Jaya and Sekolah Kebangsaan Raja Muda, Shah Alam and furthered his secondary education at the Bukit Bintang Boys' School and Mara Junior Science College (MRSM) in Muar, Johor. He then furthered his studies at the university level at the International Medical University in Bukit Jalil, Kuala Lumpur. Altimet was first exposed to hip hop music since the age of 11, citing the song "Bring the Noise" as sparking his interest in hip hop music.

== Career ==
=== Music ===
Altimet began his music career by joining the hip hop group Teh Tarik Crew established in 1999. The group also consisted of Mizz Nina, DJ Fuzz and Fiquetional. Under Teh Tarik Crew, Altimet released three albums, Are We Rap Stars Now (1999), How's The Level? (2002) and What's Next? (2004). After the group disbanded in 2007, he began his solo career.

In November 2013, Altimet collaborated with Singaporean singer Awi Rafael on a song "Kalau Aku Kaya".

In 2016, Altimet released the single "Memang Mudah" in which he collaborated with Sasi The Don and Maya Hanum. The song was recorded in conjunction with the Mudah.my's 9th anniversary.

He was the winner of the Best Performance category trophy through the song "Amboi" on the 32nd edition of Anugerah Juara Lagu (AJL) on 11 February 2018.

He ended his career as a singer on his 40th birthday on 27 November 2018. Nevertheless, he remained in the music industry as a songwriter. His final live performance was The Last Altimet Show, which was held at 16 February 2019.

=== Business ===
Altimet founded an Islamic concept clothing label for men and children named Benua Clothing with a partner who is also a close friend of his, Mohd Nizar Manaf. The label began operating in early May 2014. In addition, he also manages one of the branches of Joe's Barbershop, a barber shop chain founded by Joe Flizzow.

In 2018, he also announced that he would set up a barber shop franchise and invest in a pizza company and Al-Quran learning app, Recite.

In 2020, Altimet and manager Yasmeen Zainal collaborated to launch SVLTAN Management, an artiste management company.

=== Other appearances ===
Altimet is one of the 120 celebrities in the country who contributed to the Pete Teo's 2008 musical initiative Malaysian Artistes For Unity aimed at promoting multiculturalism and Bangsa Malaysia through songs and videos. Other celebrities involved include Afdlin Shauki, Awie, Ning Baizura, Jason Lo, Sharifah Amani, Adibah Noor and Maya Karin.

In 2016, he was appointed one of ambassadors for the 1Malaysia for Youth initiative. Altimet made him film debut in the movie Rentap as a special appearance and became the lead actor of the drama PU Wid in Astro Oasis and Astro Maya HD.

In 2017, he was cast as Sarjan Ahmad in the theatrical play Ola Bola The Musical.

== Personal life ==
Altimet has been married since 2004 and has three children. He disclosed his marriage during The Last Altimet Show.

Altimet ventured into politics by officially joining Parti Keadilan Rakyat (PKR) in April 2021. The main objectives of his participation include helping to achieve his dream of seeing the PKR president Anwar Ibrahim become the Prime Minister of Malaysia as well as strengthening the involvement of the arts in the country's political landscape.

== Discography ==
Studio Album

- First Among Equals (2007)
- Kotarayaku (2014)
- Amboi (2016)
- Air (2018)
- O (2018)

== Filmography ==
=== Film ===
Year	Title	Role
2014	Rentap	Special appearance
2018	Busker	Special appearance
2019	Ejen Ali: The Movie	Andik (Voice Actor)
2021	Hutang 2D	Gua Mambang
2021	Belaban Hidup: Infeksi Zombie	Sukma

=== Television ===
Year	Title	Role	TV Channels	Notes
2012	Umrah Kita	TV Host	TV9	With Noh Salleh & Aizat Amdan
2015	Sounds Of Muslims: Austria	TV Host	TV9	
2016	Sounds Of Muslims: Greece & Macedonia	TV Host	TV9	
2016	PU Wid	Tora	Astro Oasis	
2017	Sounds Of Muslims: Denmark	TV Host	TV9	
2017	My Mudah Stories		Astro Ria	

=== Teater ===
Year	Title	Role	Notes
2018	Ola Bola The Musical	Sarjan Ahmad	

=== Music video ===
Year	Title	Role	Catatan
2008	Here In My Home	Himself	Special song for Malaysian Artistes For Unity
2014	Hello	Himself	With The Trisno Trio
2016	Amboi	Himself	
2018	Bunga	Himself	
2018	Jejaga	Himself	With A'trez, Minah B & Mat Piah

== Concerts and tours ==
- The Last Altimet Show (2019)

== Awards and Nominated ==
Year	Awards	Category	Nominated	Result
2018	Anugerah Juara Lagu ke-32	Best Performance	"Amboi"	Won
2018	Anugerah Bintang Popular Berita Harian 2017	Popular Male Singers	—N/a	Nominated
2018	Anugerah Bintang Popular Berita Harian 2017	Popular Duo/Group Collaboration Artists (with Hazama)	—N/a	Nominated

== Election results ==
Selangor State Legislative Assembly
Year	Constituency	Candidate	Votes	Pct	Opponent(s)	Votes	Pct	Ballots cast	Majority	Turnout
2023	N20 Lembah Jaya	Syed Ahmad Syed Abdul Rahman Alhadad (PKR)	26,298	57.27%	Sharifah Haslizah Syed Ariffin (PAS)	19,620	42.73%	45,918	6,678	69.94%
