= AG Coco =

- Born: Mohd Hezry bin Mohd Hafidz; 7 July 1984 (age 42); Alor Star, Kedah, Malaysia
- Other name: AG
- Education: Maktab Mahmud Alor Setar
- Occupations: Musician; songwriter; record producer; film producer; Actor
- Years active: 2003–present
- Spouse: Zuliana Eusoff (m. 2016)
- Children: 1
- Musical career
- Genres: Rock
- Instrument: Guitar
- Labels: Kamar Seni Recording Studio; Noh Phrofile
- Website: agcoco.com

Mohd Hezry bin Mohd Hafidz (born 7 July 1984), better known by his stage name AG Coco, is a Malaysian record producer, actor, songwriter and lead guitarist of the rock band Hujan.

Born and raised in Kedah, Hezry first became known as a lead guitarist for rock band Hujan in the late 2000s, producing singles for recording artists such as Yuna, Tomok and Hafiz. He also led as an orchestra conductor for local television productions and competition television series.

== Life and career ==
Hezry was born on 7 July 1984 in Alor Setar, Kedah. He was raised in a middle-class background, attending Maktab Mahmud Alor Setar. In his early years, he was introduced to bass and bought a secondhand RM300 drum kit with an agreement with his mother to get a good score for his examination in return for the drum sponsorship. His first band, D'Relax participated in the local competition battle of the bands in Kedah/Perlis region and won first place in the gig as drummer of the band. Later, he and other members of five different bands post-competition formed Coco (Combination of Creative Obsessions). Recording company soon interested in Coco band and eventually signing them as recording artist in 2003.

Originally known as Akademi Seni Kebangsaan (ASK), but renamed to Akademi Seni Budaya dan Warisan Kebangsaan (ASWARA) in 2006, was where Hezry expanded his musical knowledge mainly in jazz. For his weekly performance evaluation there, instead of just performing with the academy student, he brought Hujan, an outsider group to perform according to what his lecturer had taught him by performing "Pagi Yang Gelap". He first contacted Noh Salleh in Myspace knowing that Noh's songs could take off in the local music industry.

Kamar Seni Recording Studio was established in 2009. Initially, his family was against his musical career in the beginning because of social stigma of musicians cannot support themselves. His recording studio has been producing multiple local recording artists and local television music shows.

== Discography ==
=== Writing credits ===
Hujan

- 1, 2, 3, Go! (2007)
- Check Check Rock Rock (2007)
- Hujan (2008)
- Mencari Konklusi (2009)
- Lonely Soldier Boy (2010)
- Sang Enemy (2012)
- Jika Sempat (2016)
- Suria (2018)
- Pelangi Dan Kau (2020)

Yuna

- Terukir Di Bintang (2012)
- Lelaki (2013)

Coco

- Kombinasi (2003)
- Mengintai ke Langit (2006)
- Hey You (2009)

Astro

- P. Ramlee: Satu Indiepretasi (2011)
- Ada Imam dikalangan Kita
- Aku Sudirman

== Film scores ==
Shorts film

- Adik (directed by Fazryl Samad)
- Kampung Bangsar (directed by Sharifah Amani)
- Hawa (directed by Sharifah Amani)
- Terbang (directed by Hisham Salleh & Linus Chung)
- Blessings (directed by Hisham Salleh & Linus Chung)
- DYA (directed by Faidzal Annuar)

Feature film

- Impak Maksima (Excellent Film)
- Anak Jantan (Grand Brilliance)

== Concert tours ==
- Fantasia Music Tour (2004)
- Kugiran Hujan Ke United Kingdom (2007)
- Check Check Rock Rock Tour Hujan (2007)
- Mencari Konklusi Tour (2009)
- Hujan & Search Europe Tour (2011)
- Festival Muzika Melbourne Australia (2012)
- Yuna Homecoming Tour (2013)
- Hujan London Tour (2016)
