= AmMetLife =

Life insurance company

AmMetLife Insurance Berhad
- Type: Private limited company
- Industry: Insurance
- Predecessor: AmLife Insurance Berhad
- Founded: 30 April 2014; 12 years ago
- Headquarters: Menara 1 Sentrum; Jalan Tun Sambanthan, Kuala Lumpur, Malaysia
- Key people: Wan Saifulrizal Wan Ismail (CEO); Wong Teck Kat (Chairman)
- Products: Life insurance
- Parent: MetLife International Holdings Inc. (50% + 1 share) (MetLife); AMMB Holdings Berhad (50% – 1 share)
- Website: www.ammetlife.com

AmMetLife Takaful Berhad
- Type: Private limited company
- Industry: Takaful
- Predecessor: AmFamily Takaful Berhad
- Founded: 30 April 2014; 12 years ago
- Headquarters: Menara 1 Sentrum; Jalan Tun Sambanthan, Kuala Lumpur, Malaysia
- Key people: Nazrulhisham Abdul Hamid (CEO); Azman Hashim (Chairman)
- Products: Family Takaful
- Parent: AMMB Holdings Berhad (50% + 1 share); MetLife International Holdings Inc. (50% – 1 share) (MetLife)
- Website: www.ammetlifetakaful.com

AmMetLife is the name of Malaysian life insurance company, AmMetLife Insurance Berhad, and family takaful operator, AmMetLife Takaful Berhad. The companies are joint ventures between AmBank Group and New York-based MetLife. They offer a range of insurance and wealth protection products through AmBank's branch offices.

AmMetLife was formed when MetLife agreed to purchase stakes in AmBank Group's life insurance and family takaful businesses for RM812 million. The deal closed in April 2014. MetLife has 50 percent plus one share in AmMetLife Insurance and 50 percent less one share in AmMetLife Takaful. As part of the deal, AmMetLife has an exclusive 20-year agreement to sell insurance and takaful products through AmBank and AmIslamic Bank.

As of March 2015, AmMetLife had an agency force of 1,100 and had the 10th highest market share among 14 life insurers in Malaysia.
