= Azman Hashim =

Malaysian businessman

Yang Berbahagia Tan Sri Dato' Seri Azman Hashim PSM SSTM DPMS JMN KMN AO
- Born: 17 July 1939 (age 87); Kampung Baru, Kuala Lumpur, British Malaya (now Malaysia)
- Occupations: Businessman; Accountant
- Known for: Founder and former chairman of AmBank
- Spouse: Tunku Arishah Tunku Maamor (m. 1963)
- Children: 5, including Mizz Nina

Tan Sri Dato' Seri Azman bin Hashim (born 17 July 1939) is a Malaysian businessman and investor who is one of the richest people in Malaysia. His net worth was estimated by Forbes to be US$660 million in 2024.

== Early life ==
Azman bin Hashim was born on 17 July 1939 in Kuala Lumpur into a family of 13 siblings and spent his childhood in Kampung Baru. His mother, Zabedah Shahid, was a schoolteacher who later became headmistress of the Kampung Baru Girls' School, and his father was a technician. Azman's grandmother was from Imabari, Ehime, Japan. He attended the Malay Boys' School in Setapak and the Methodist Boys' School in Sentul. In 1954, at age 15, he sat for the Senior Cambridge Examination and obtained First Class marks. He became a Chartered Accountant and Chartered Secretary before the age of 21.

== Career ==
Azman's career began in Perth, where he worked at Chartered Accountants Messrs O.L. Haines & Co from 1955 to 1960 on a Colombo Plan scholarship. Upon his return to Malaysia in 1960, he spent four years at Bank Negara Malaysia before leaving to start his own chartered accountancy firm, Azman & Co., which later became Azman Wang Salleh & Co. He became a fellow of the Institute of Chartered Accountants Australia and the Institute of Chartered Secretaries and Administrators in 1960, and later the Institute of Bankers, Malaysia, the Institute of Directors, Malaysia and the Malaysian Institute of Management. He joined Maybank in 1966 as its non-executive director, then served as executive director from 1971 to 1980. He was Executive Chairman of Kwong Yik Bank Berhad from 1980 and 1982.

Azman purchased the AmBank Group (AMMB), then called the Arab-Malaysian Merchant Bank, in 1982. He oversaw the company during the Malaysian economic crisis in 1980; the 1997 Asian financial crisis, during which the bank was nearly folded into Affin Bank in an effort by the government to consolidate banks; and the 2008 financial crisis. In 2017, he began to transition out of his roles of Chairman and Director in six companies within AmBank Group: AmBank, AmInvestment Bank, AmMetLife Takaful, AmBank Islamic, AmMetLife Insurance, and AmGeneral Insurance. He was Chairman of AmBank Group from 1991 to 2019. After fully retiring from AMMB in 2022, he remained in his role of Chairman for the Asian Institute of Chartered Bankers, Asian Banking School, Financial Industry Collective Outreach, Malaysia South-South Corp, Malaysia-Japan Economic Association, Perdana Leadership Foundation, Malaysia South-South Association, and University of Technology Malaysia's Business School Advisory Council, and as Chairman Emeritus of the Pacific Basin Economic Council. He also continued to serve as Chairman Emeritus and honorary advisor on AmBank's board.

Over the course of his career, he has held roles as Chairman of the Asian Institute of Finance's board of directors, Japan-Malaysia Economic Association (MAJECA), Malaysian Investment Banking Association, National Productivity Corporation, and Institute of Bankers Malaysia. He has also served as president of the Malaysia South-South Corporation, Malaysia-Japan Economic Association, and Friends of Prisons Association. In 2015, he was an existing member of the National Economic Consultative Council II, APEC Business Advisory Council, Malaysia-British Business Council, and the International Centre for Education in Islamic Finance. He is also Pro Chancellor of Open University Malaysia.

== Awards and honours ==
Awards given to Azman throughout his career include: Asia's Banker of the Year (FinanceAsia, 1985); ASEAN Businessman of the Year (ASEAN Business Forum, 1993); Manager of the Year (Harvard Business School Alumni Club of Malaysia, 1995); Grand Entrepreneurial Award (Kuala Lumpur Malay Chamber of Commerce, 1996); Menteri Besar Grand Entrepreneurial Award (Selangor Chamber of Commerce, 1997); Academy Values for Life Excellence for his humanitarian contributions (2004); and the Lifetime Achievement Award (Islamic Business and Finance Awards, 2009).

The Ace Convention Centre in Kuala Lumpur and University of Technology Malaysia (UTM) both have auditoriums named after him. In 2018, after two years of RM5 million in donations to the school's endowment fund, UTM officially named its banking school the Azman Hashim International Business School. UTM's campus also has a Azman Hashim Stadium. In 2019, the Open University Malaysia established the Azman Hashim Chair in E-Learning. In 2020, he donated a Japanese garden, Miyakubo Hashim (橋夢) Park, to Imabari, Ehime, Japan, where his grandmother was born. In 2023, a RM13.9 million sports facility, the Azman Hashim Community Sports Centre, opened in Sibu Jaya.

=== Honours of Malaysia ===
- Malaysia:
  - Commander of the Order of Loyalty to the Crown of Malaysia (PSM) – Tan Sri (1988)
  - Companion of the Order of the Defender of the Realm (JMN) (1984)
  - Officer of the Order of the Defender of the Realm (KMN) (1972)
- Negeri Sembilan:
  - Knight Grand Companion of the Order of Loyalty to Tuanku Muhriz (SSTM) – Dato' Seri (2010)
- Selangor:
  - Knight Commander of the Order of the Crown of Selangor (DPMS) – Dato' (1980)

=== Foreign honours ===
- Australia:
  - Honorary Officer of the Order of Australia (AO) (2008)
- Japan:
  - Third Class of the Order of the Rising Sun (1987)

=== Honorary degrees ===
- Universiti Utara Malaysia: Honorary Doctorate in Philosophy (1985)
- National University of Malaysia: Honorary Degree in Business Administration (2004)
- University of Malaya: Honorary Doctorate in Management (2013)
- International Islamic University Malaysia: Honorary Doctorate in Philosophy in Finance (2013)
- Universiti Sains Malaysia: Honorary Doctorate in Management (2016)
- University of Technology Malaysia: Honorary Doctorate in Management Leadership (2017)

== Personal life ==
Azman married Tunku Arishah Tunku Maamor on 3 March 1963 and has two sons and three daughters. One of his daughters, Shazrina, is a fashion designer and former vocalist. His son Shahman was made chairman of RCE Capital in 2022 and his daughter Shalina is Chairman at Amcorp Properties. Azman is involved in the charitable organizations Malaysian Liver Foundation, Better Malaysia Foundation, and AmGroup Foundation.

His official biography, The Entrepreneurship Banker by Datuk Dr Paddy Bowie, was released in 2015.
