= AmBank Tower =

Skyscraper in Kuala Lumpur, Malaysia

- Menara AmBank
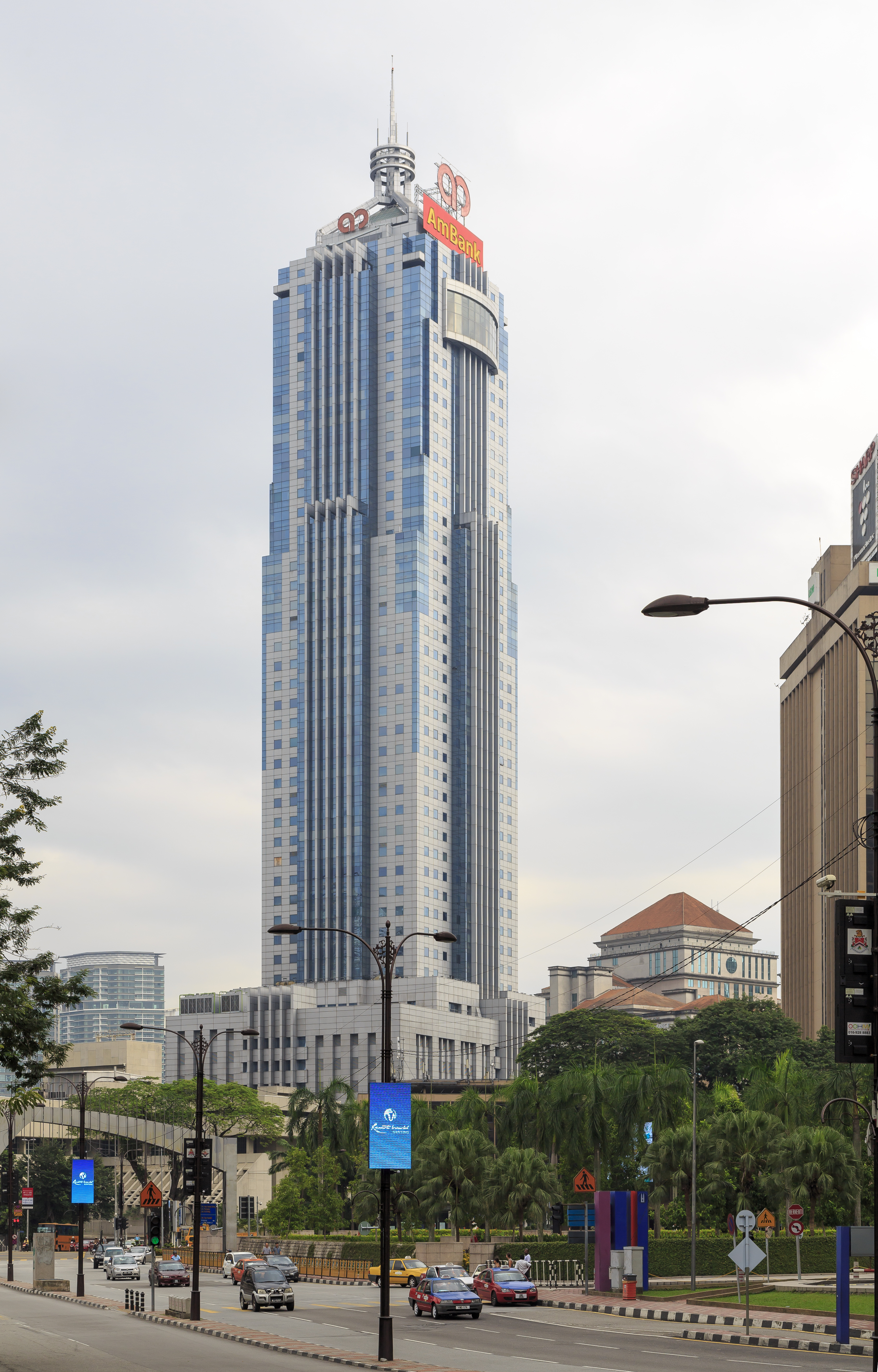

General information
- Status: Completed
- Type: Commercial offices
- Location: 8 Jalan Yap Kwan Seng; Kuala Lumpur, Malaysia
- Coordinates: 3.162073°N 101.710970°E
- Completed: 1998

Height
- Architectural: 210 m (690 ft)
- Tip: 227 m (745 ft)
- Antenna spire: 17 m (56 ft)
- Top floor: 205.7 m (675 ft)

Technical details
- Floor count: 50
- Floor area: 458,187 m^{2} (4,931,880 sq ft)

Design and construction
- Architects: TR Hamzah & Yeang

AmBank Tower (Malay: Menara AmBank) is the 41st tallest skyscraper in Malaysia. The tower is located in Jalan Yap Kwan Seng; merely 0.05 km from the Kuala Lumpur City Centre. The tower was officially launched by the fourth Prime Minister of Malaysia, Mahathir Mohamad in 2003. It also has an 17 m (56 ft) antenna on the top of the building. The tower houses the headquarters of AmBank Group.

== Tenants ==
Besides AmBank, the tower also houses notable tenants such as Klinik Pergigian Cana, Co-working space (HQ by International Workplace Group), as well as Wolf & Turtle Coffee, Cafe Mesra & Bungkus Kaw Kaw.

== History ==
In June 2026, AmBank (M) Bhd, a wholly owned subsidiary of AMMB Holdings, signed a conditional sale and purchase agreement to buy Menara AmBank from AmFIRST REIT, represented by its trustee, Maybank Trustees, for 331 ℛℳ million. Because AmBank is a major unitholder of the REIT, the deal was a related-party transaction, and the REIT appointed Affin Hwang Investment Bank as independent adviser to its non-interested directors. At the time of the announcement, the building had a net lettable area of 453,419 sq ft and was 77.8% occupied.

In the financial year ended 31 March 2025, it generated about RM19.9 million in rental income and RM9.4 million in net property income, and its audited net book value in the REIT's accounts was about RM326.2 million. AmFIRST REIT planned to use the proceeds to settle the redemption sum discharging existing charges over the property, partly repay bank borrowings and cover disposal expenses. The sale became unconditional on 21 September 2026 after all conditions were fulfilled. The property has 557 parking bays. AmFIRST REIT's chief executive said the tower's occupancy, in the high-70% range, had weighed on the trust's overall portfolio occupancy.

== See also ==
- List of tallest buildings in Kuala Lumpur
- AmBank
