= Daphne Iking =

Malaysian television personality

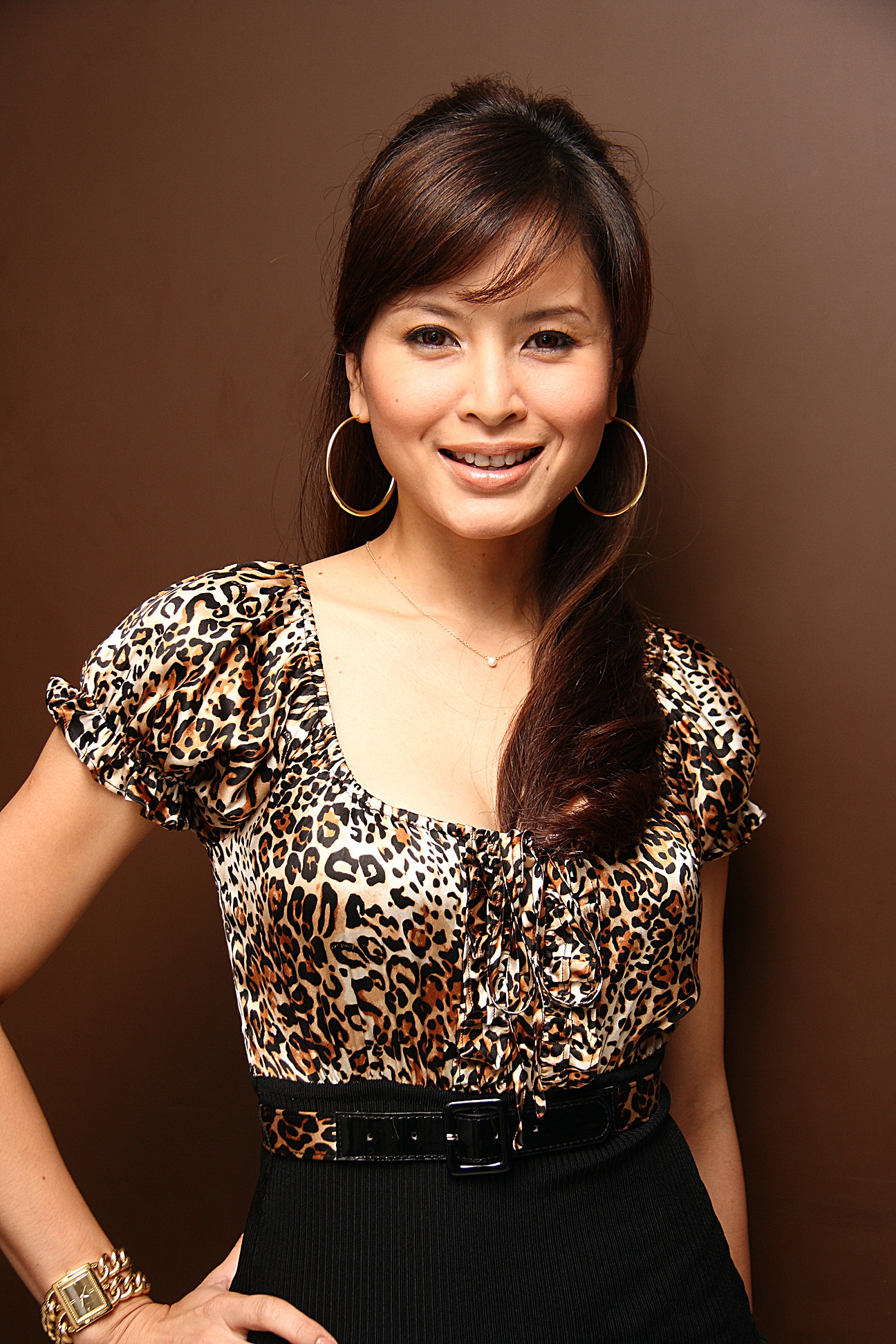
- Born: Daphne Eleanor Mozes Iking; 6 July 1978 (age 48); Keningau, Sabah, Malaysia
- Other name: Dahlia Eleanor Iking
- Education: Universiti Sains Malaysia, Penang
- Occupations: Model, Professional Emcee, Corporate Trainer (Public Speaking and Media Handling), Actress, TV Anchor, Journalist, Producer, Wellness Advocate
- Years active: 2003–present
- Known for: The Breakfast Show, Explorace, Ringgit Sense
- Spouses: Ryan Chong (m. 2007; div. 2009) Azmi Abdul Rahman (m. 2010)
- Children: Isobel, Iman, Isidore, Ilon
- Website: defttalks.com

Dahlia Eleanor Iking (née Daphne Mozes Iking; born 6 July 1978), known as Daphne Iking, is a Malaysian television personality, an emcee and an occasional actress.

== Early life ==
Daphne was born in Keningau, Sabah, Malaysia to a former nurse, Naili Juliah Ganahong (b. 1956) who was a resident of that town and a former policeman, banker turned local politician Mozes Michael Iking (1951–2016) who hailed from Tambunan district. She is the second eldest amongst four siblings and grew up in the UK before moving back to Malaysia in 1988, where she resided in Penampang. before leaving to Penang to further her tertiary studies there. She completed both her degree and master's degree in communications at the Universiti Sains Malaysia, Penang in 2002. She converted to Islam in early 2010.

== Television and other ventures ==
Prior to her career in television Daphne worked as a marketing executive for Skywalker TV. Iking first entered the television scene as the model in a Pond's advertisement. The next year saw her co-hosting Ringgit Sense, a TV3 show on finance, alongside Nazrudin Rahman.

Daphne Iking won the beauty queen title of Unduk Ngadau Kuala Lumpur in 2003. Then in late May 2003, she represented Kuala Lumpur at the state level at Hongkod Koisaan, Penampang and becoming the first winner representing Kuala Lumpur to win the title.

Iking quickly became a recognisable face as the host of reality show Explorace, a reality show similar to The Amazing Race, in 2004 for two years where she is known for her lively personality. She then went on to host PNB World Investment Challenge on TV3, Vector Challenge on 8TV, Explorace Kids on TV3 and Health and Beauty Capsule in May/Antabax. She also reported for TV3's factual programmes The Brand and Majalah Tiga.

In 2006, she gained a supporting role as Daphne in 8TV's dramedy series KL Lights. She also hosted with Nazarudin Rahman again in My Australian Adventure, a sponsored travelogue show in TV3.

As well as having hosted My Australian Adventures, the Malaysian celebrity was also the scriptwriter for the show.

Later that year, she moved to ntv7 and hosted The Breakfast Show. She was the assistant producer of The Breakfast Show.

She was a supporting actress in telemovie Adik, in 2007 and played a minor role in Singaporean drama District 9 Pilot.

In 2009, Iking was nominated in the Malaysian Shout! Awards for "Favourite Television Personality" as host for The Breakfast Show.

Iking played a con-woman in Belukar, a Malaysian independent film released in 2010 and won the "Most Promising Actress" for this role.

In late 2010, Iking played as a nurse suffering from domestic abuse which is one of the characters included in the short film Prelude in F Minor.

She was also the supporting actress in the local comedy film My Spy in 2010.

In October 2010, Daphne Iking was nominated for the second time for "Favourite Television Personality" as the host of The Breakfast Show during the Shout! Awards.

Iking left The Breakfast Show after four years in 2011 as she was invited to be part of an English Women's programme called "Bella" on ntv7.

Daphne has stepped out of her comfort zone hosting shows only in the English medium, and started taking offers to do Malay programmes. RTM commissioned a production house to create a new program “Ekspresi Kreatif D.I.Y Daphne” with Daphne as the host – a show that depicts her love for DIY projects.

Recognised as a well-known face in the Malaysian entertainment industry, Daphne was offered to host TLC's hit reality show "Say Yes To The Dress Asia" alongside fashion designer Dato' Jovian Mandagie.

She appeared for the third time in the list of FHM Malaysia's annual Most Wanted Female 2010 at number 40.

She also appeared in music video "Sumandak Sabah" by Marsha Milan and Velvet Aduk alongside the Unduk Ngadau winners.

In 2019, she was invited to share her journey as a Mualaf on Astro's Naura Shares, followed by a guest host stint with Sheikh Hussin Yee.

In August 2019, she was invited to host a 10 episode show “Girl’s Day Out” with fellow activist friend and TV Personality, Lisa Surihani for Astro Naura. The show talks about Women's Rights in Islam and debunking the common myths surrounding Muslim Women and their roles in society.

== Personal life ==
By October 2006 she started a relationship with businessman Ryan Chong Yiing Yih. They met while Iking was filming KL Lights. She revealed that she was getting married, in a live talk show. The wedding was held in Bali, Indonesia in January 2007 and the event was published in the Malaysian edition of Hello magazine. The couple had a daughter, Isobel Daniella.

In 2009, Chong accused a managing director, Darren Choy Khin Ming under the Penal Code of 498 of Malaysian law for "enticing or taking away or detaining with a criminal intent a married woman". Iking and Chong divorced that year.

She embraced Islam, prior to her wedding with entrepreneur Azmi Abdul Rahman.
