= Perdana Leadership Foundation =

- Yayasan Kepimpinan Perdana
- Formation: 2003
- Founder: Mahathir Mohamad
- Founded at: Putrajaya, Malaysia
- Type: Non-profit organisation
- Legal status: Foundation
- Headquarters: Precinct 8, Putrajaya
- Location: Malaysia
- Coordinates: 2.9127°N 101.6738°E
- Region served: Malaysia
- Honorary President: Mahathir Mohamad
- Board of Trustees Chairman: Azman Hashim
- Executive director: Nik Mohamed Nik Yaacob
- General manager: Zarina Abu Bakar
- Website: www.perdana.org.my

YouTube information
- Channel: Perdana Leadership Foundation
- Genre: Political Influencing
- Subscribers: 972
- Views: 226,830
- Last updated: July 2026

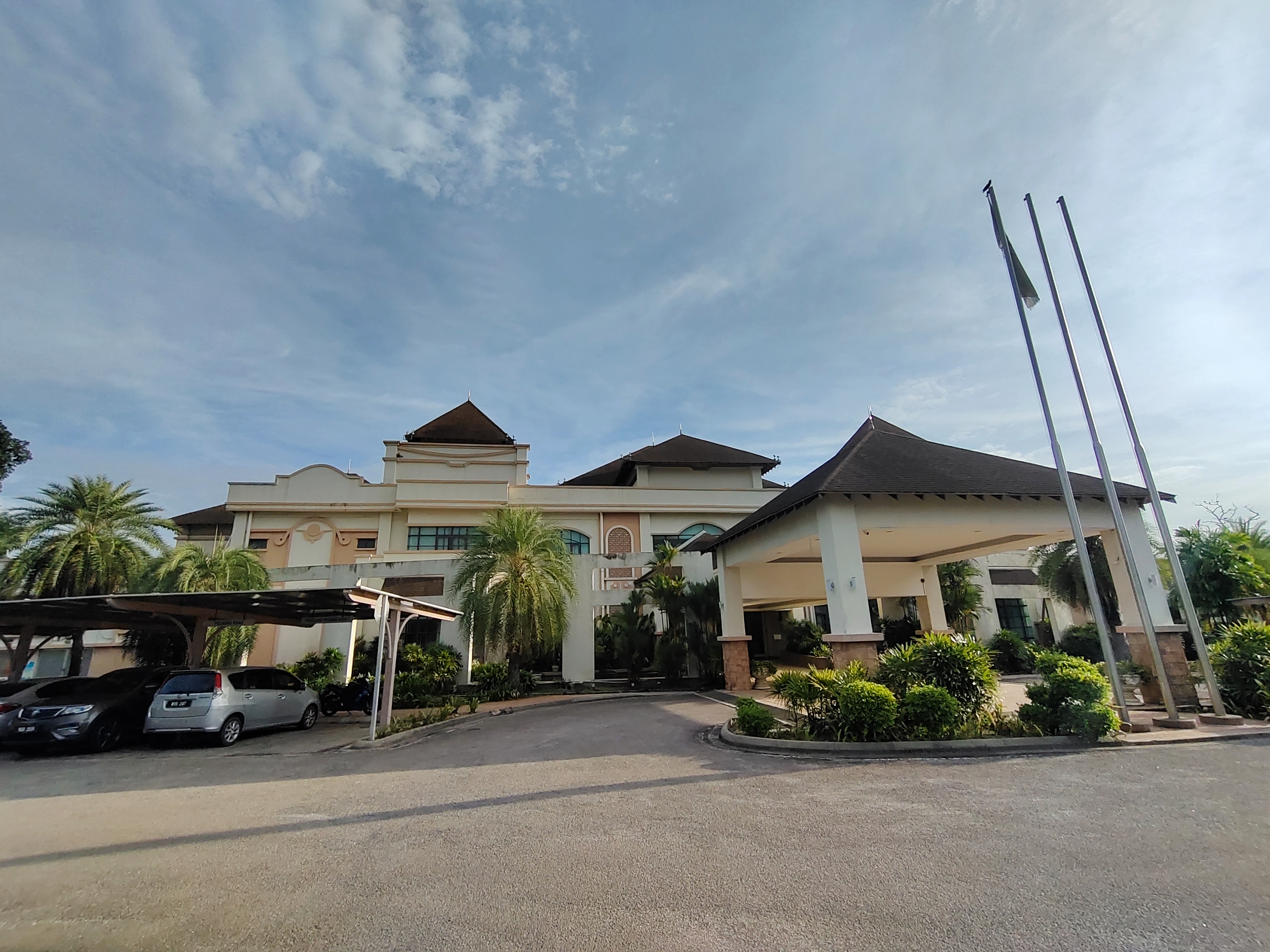
Perdana Leadership Foundation

Perdana Leadership Foundation (Malay: Yayasan Kepimpinan Perdana) is a foundation established to preserve, research and disseminate information on the past Prime Ministers of Malaysia. The foundation's main aim is to increase awareness of Malaysia's intellectual heritage based on its belief that past leadership can provide important resources and insights for future development. A tax-exempt, non-profit organisation, the Foundation intends to become the premier institution for the study of Malaysia’s past Prime Ministers and the central resource centre for research into national stewardship as well as a platform for reflection, debate, and discussion with distinguished figures in Malaysian leadership.

A broader objective is to initiate greater understanding and co-operation through research and idea-sharing, while inspiring a positive change in the values of Malaysians throughout the world.

Established in early 2003, the idea was mooted by Mathias Chang, Political Secretary to the Prime Minister and was well accepted by the government and private sectors. Thus, a special trust committee was formed with members mostly from private sector and headed by Azizan Zainul Abidin (President, Putrajaya Corporation; President, Petronas) to materialize this idea. The Foundation was launched by then-Prime Minister, Abdullah Ahmad Badawi on 10 May 2005. Before that, Mahathir launched the Perdana Library on 29 April 2004.

In June 2016, The Umno Supreme Council decided to cease all government financial support for the PLF. The party made this decision following a proposal by the Umno Youth wing, which cited the foundation being utilized to topple the government. After these allegations were made, the PLF issued a statement denying that it received direct government funding, clarifying that its operations were funded by private donations and that the state only paid for building rental and civil servants' salaries.

In March 2023, the Minister in the Prime Minister's Department (Sabah, Sarawak Affairs and Special Functions), Armizan Mohd Ali, stated in a written parliamentary reply that Mahathir retained the legal right to utilize the office space within the PLF building for his secretariat under the Members of Parliament (Remuneration) Act 1980. The government confirmed no direct financial allocations were provided to the foundation, with expenditures restricted to renting space for the former Prime Minister's secretariat.

== Objectives ==
Objectives of Perdana Leadership Foundation:

- To research, document, disseminate and publicise the intellectual legacies of Malaysia’s past prime ministers.
- To elucidate and illuminate the contribution of Malaysia’s past Prime Ministers in the social, economic and political development of the nation.
- To create awareness of the development process of the nation and serve as a platform for future development.
- To be a resource centre of policies, strategies and initiatives that were adopted under Malaysia’s various prime ministers which may be used and adapted as models for the development of other nations.

The Foundation’s broader objective is to promote global understanding by providing a channel for scholars and thinkers to undertake research and idea-sharing.

== Administration ==
Mahathir delivered a speech at PLF in 2025

Its Honorary President is the fourth & seventh prime minister, Mahathir Mohamad. The foundation also has a Board of Trustees, chaired by Azman Hashim, whose members are prominent figures in the banking, education and property sectors. Day-to-day management is headed by Nik Mohamed Nik Yaacob, formerly the CEO of Sime Darby Berhad.

== Library ==

The Foundation operates a physical and digital library, the Perdana Library which provides direct access to a wealth of information on Malaysia's past Prime Ministers. The Library collects, organises, preserves and disseminates materials by and about Malaysia's national leaders and events connected to them, and outlines the policies, strategies and initiatives they adopted. In line with the Foundation's objective of disseminating information on Malaysian leadership, these materials are digitised and are made available to the public through the Internet. To date, the Foundation has close to 10,000 items in its physical collections (including photos and audio video materials) and more than three hundred and thirty thousand records in its digital collections. Some of the Library's resources can be accessed for free via the Foundation's website while others are available only to members.

== Digital Preservation Initiative ==
The Foundation actively digitises materials connected to the leadership history of the country. These materials include speeches, books, news clippings, magazine articles, videos and audio tapes. It collaborates with the National Archives and the National Library to digitise these institutions' holdings (with a copy handed back to the source institution) and seeks to take this initiative nationwide to centralise and digitise materials of historical import. To date, the Foundation has digitised more than three hundred thirty thousand documents, equivalent to more than eight million pages, consisting of speeches of former PMs, news clippings, journal articles, and Parliamentary Hansards. In terms of technology, the Foundation has invested in a book scanning machine, OCR software and an upgraded search engine to enable more efficient research.

== Building ==
The building is located at Precinct 8, Putrajaya. This building is equipped with facilities such as a Library (Perdana Library), auditorium, meeting rooms, administrative offices and a banquet hall.
