= Lesson of the Season =

EP by Bunkface
- Released: December 2007
- Genre: Pop punk; punk rock; alternative rock
- Length: 24:09
- Label: Bunkface Production
- Producer: Bunkface

Bunkface chronology
| Lesson of the Season (2007) | Phobia Phoney (2010) |

Lesson of the Season is an EP by Bunkface, released in December 2007 on their own budget. This EP represents the band's first release of songs. The song "Silly Lily" was number 1 on Hitz.fm's Malaysian Top Ten for 8 weeks and number 1 on Fly.fm's Campur Chart for 10 weeks. "Silly Lily" was the first song they made.

== Track listing ==
All tracks are written by Sam, Youk, Paan and Biak

| No. | Title | Length |
|---|---|---|
| 1. | "Tired Mission" | 3:43 |
| 2. | "Silly Lily" | 3:40 |
| 3. | "Highschool Rocker" | 3:52 |
| 4. | "Fine" | 4:20 |
| 5. | "Land Of Hope" | 4:17 |
| 6. | "Last Minute" | 4:15 |
| 7. | "Hyper Killer" |
| Total length: | | 24:09 |

== Personnel ==
- Sam - vocals, rhythm guitar
- Youk - back-up vocals, bass
- Paan - back-up vocals, lead guitar
- Biak - drums, percussion
