= NexG PrePaid =

NexG PrePaid is a pre-paid credit card issued by AmBank, Malaysia. The card is available in AmBank branches and most 7-Eleven stores in the country. It was the first attempt to bring pre-paid credit cards into the Malaysian market and as of 2007, more than 100,000 NexG cards are in circulation.

== See also ==
- VISA
- American Express
- Diners Club
- Discover
- Maestro
- Octopus card
