= Malam Ini Kita Punya =

Studio album by Bunkface
- Released: October 3, 2014
- Recorded: 2014
- Genre: Pop rock, Pop punk, Punk rock
- Length: 27:24
- Label: Sony Music Entertainment
- Producer: Bunkface

Bunkface chronology
Bunk Not Dead (2012)	Malam Ini Kita Punya (2014)

Singles from Malam Ini Kita Punya
- 1. "Anugerah Syawal" Released: 6 August 2013; 2. "Rentak Laguku" Released: 15 February 2014; 3. "Malam Ini Kita Punya" Released: 9 September 2014; 4. "Darah Muda" Released: 17 July 2015

Malam Ini Kita Punya (Malay for 'Tonight, We Have...' ) is the third studio album from Malaysian punk rock band, Bunkface. This album was released on 3 October 2014 at the Bee, Publika, Kuala Lumpur. The album contains seven Malay tracks, all of which were written by Sam. It is their first album produced by Sony Music Entertainment Malaysia following Bunkface signing to be under the recording company earlier in the year.

== Release and promotion ==
For the promotion of the album, Bunkface was chosen as DiGi x Deezer Spotlight Artis of the Month. Bunkface is the first act to be featured in DiGi x Deezer Spotlight session in Malaysia. The session was held at the Bee, Publika Shopping Gallery. For Deezer promotion, the album was released on 29 September 2014; almost a week before the official launch.

== Singles ==
- Rentak Laguku was released on iTunes on 10 February 2014. The single features Malaysian rock legend, Amy Search. A music video was subsequently uploaded on Bunkface's Vevo account on 15 February 2014. The song received critical success, including winning Best Rock Song at Anugerah Industri Muzik 2013/2014 as well as short-listed for the prestigious Anugerah Juara Lagu 2014.
- Malam Ini Kita Punya was released as the second single on iTunes on 30 August 2014. A music video was subsequently uploaded on Bunkface's Vevo account on 10 November 2014. The video was shot on a helipad at KH Tower (Menara KH) in Kuala Lumpur. The video was directed by Zul Luey.
- The third radio single, Darah Muda was released on the first day of 2015 Eid al-Fitr. An official video was released on 17 July 2015 through their Vevo account. The video - directed by Nasir Mehmood Sabir Mohd (KixASS) - includes footage of Bunkface's travelogue to Ishikawa, Japan, Sam's marriage as well as their live shows.

== Track listing ==
No.	Title	Writer(s)	Length
1.	"Salam (Intro)"		1:35
2.	"Malam Ini Kita Punya"	Sam Bunkface	3:35
3.	"Kembali"		3:36
4.	"Rentak Laguku (feat. Amy Search)"	Sam Bunkface	3:55
5.	"Darah Muda"		3:48
6.	"Orang Kita"		4:00
7.	"Goyang"		3:46
8.	"Anugerah Syawal"		3:09
Total length:			27:24

== Awards ==
Year	Award	Recipients and nominees	Category	Result	Host country
2014	Anugerah Industri Muzik Ke-21	"Rentak Laguku"	Best Rock Song	Won	Malaysia
2014	Anugerah Juara Lagu 2014	"Rentak Laguku"	Best Song	Nominated	Malaysia
2015	Anugerah Planet Muzik	Malam Ini Kita Punya	Best Song (Malaysia)	Nominated	Singapore
2015	Anugerah Planet Muzik	Bunkface	Best Band	Nominated	Singapore
2015	Anugerah Juara Lagu Ke-30	Malam Ini Kita Punya	Best Song	Nominated	Malaysia
