= Bunk Not Dead =

Studio album by Bunkface
- Released: 17 July 2012
- Genres: Punk rock, pop punk, alternative rock
- Length: 43:00
- Label: Bunkface Production
- Producer: Bunkface

Bunkface chronology
Phobia Phoney (2010)	Bunk Not Dead (2012)	Malam Ini Kita Punya (2014)

Singles from Bunk Not Dead
- 1. "Panik" Released: 11 February 2012; 2. "Jatuh" Released: 3 April 2012; 3. "More" Released: 9 May 2012; 4. "Kita Perang Kita Menang"; 5. "Agenda Jahiliah"

Bunk Not Dead is the second album released by Bunkface, a Malaysian punk rock band. It was produced by their own 'Bunkface Productions'. The album was released on 17 July 2012 in Malaysia. Bunk Not Dead consists of 9 English songs and 4 Malay songs, including their hit singles "Panik", "Jatuh" and "More".

This album took two years to complete due to hectic touring schedules. The first single, "Panik", was recorded entirely in Jakarta and Indonesia with an estimated cost of RM16,000. For the remaining songs, they were recorded in Iseek Music Studio, located in Kota Damansara. Mixing of the album was done by 'Mas Henk' of Palu Studio from Jakarta, Indonesia, while the Mastering process was handled by Tom Waltz of 'Tom Waltz Mastering' from USA.

In Bunk Not Dead, Bunkface showed musical maturity, with deeper lyrics and heavier music than their previous works. This album presents a sense and expression of anger from Bunkface to the world around them, especially their nation's music industry, which has been discriminating the local punk rock music scene.

Bunkface have made a joint venture with Hunter Interactive Worldwide. Bhd. which made the album the first to use the Augmented Reality technology. AR album is an album that contains hidden code behind images allows the graphics in the album is moving when viewed through an Android phone or an iPhone. But it is only available in limited edition copies While still working with Indigital Music Sdn Bhd (digital), Bunkface also used the services of Warner Music Malaysia to help in the distribution of the album throughout Malaysia

== Track listing ==
No.	Title	Writer(s)	Length
1.	"More!"	Sam	3:24
2.	"Bunk Not Dead!"	Sam	2:16
3.	"Hollywood Just Died!"	Sam	3:16
4.	"Agenda Jahilliah"	Sam	3:50
5.	"Panik"	Sam	3:44
6.	"Jatuh"	Sam	3:49
7.	"Kita Perang Kita Menang"	Sam, Youk	3:40
8.	"Supernova"	Sam	3:37
9.	"In Another Life"	Sam	1:31
10.	"Wont Let You Go"	Sam	3:16
11.	"The Mr Dj Took It Away"	Sam	3:09
12.	"Better Off This Way"	Sam	3:29
13.	"The Insider"	Sam	4:07

== Personnel ==
- Sam - Vocals, guitar
- Paan - Guitar, backing vocals
- Youk - Bass, backing vocals
- Ijam Coda - Drums
- Wawa - Keyboards and synths
- Ajam - Keyboards and synths
- Genervie Kam Shi Ling - Piano on "Jatuh"
- Mas Henk(Pak Hiro)- Mixing
- Tom Waltz - Mastering
