= Phobia Phoney =

Studio album by Bunkface
- Released: March 29, 2009
- Genre: Punk rock, alternative rock, pop punk
- Length: 34:04
- Label: Bunkface Production
- Producer: Bunkface

Bunkface chronology
Lesson of the Season (2007)	Phobia Phoney (2009)	Bunk Not Dead (2012)

Singles from Phobia Phoney
- 1. "Situasi"; 2. "Bunk Anthem"; 3. "Revolusi"; 4. "Prom Queen"; 5. "Ekstravaganza"; 6. "Escape Dance"; 7. "Soldier"; 8. "Dunia"

Phobia Phoney is the debut album released by Bunkface, a Malaysian punk rock band, in 2010. It was made by their own production named Bunkface Production.The album was released in March 2009 in Malaysia. Phobia Phoney is made up of 6 English songs and 4 Malay songs. It is including their hit singles such as "Situasi", "Revolusi", "Prom Queen", "Ekstravaganza", "Escape Dance", "Soldier" and "Dunia".

"The album is about the fear (phobia) of getting to that step, to get to that level where we are now. We were really scared, so that journey taught us how to handle situations, discrimination and we revolutionized ourselves from time to time. The discrimination bit came up when we started the band, when we tried to bring our sound to the music industry, to build up Bunkface, and people were rejecting and saying this and that, so to us it was like “Fine, we don’t care what you want to say, we’re going to try,” and here we are now. We realized at one point that we were ready to go and ready to step to that level, therefore the album title is called Phobia Phoney – it's about our journey," The band stated in an interview with MTV.

== Track listing ==
No.	Title	Length
1.	"Bunk Anthem"	2:59
2.	"Prom Queen"	3:05
3.	"Revolusi"	3:22
4.	"Soldier"	4:13
5.	"Escape Dance"	3:09
6.	"Dunia"	3:42
7.	"Ekstravaganza"	3:41
8.	"Situasi"	3:57
9.	"You & Me"	3:13
10.	"Minute To The End"	3:26

== Personnel ==
- Sam – vocals, guitar
- Paan – guitar, backing vocals
- Youk – bass, backing vocals
- Ejam – drums
- Gjie – synths and keyboards
