= Bunkface =

Malaysian rock band

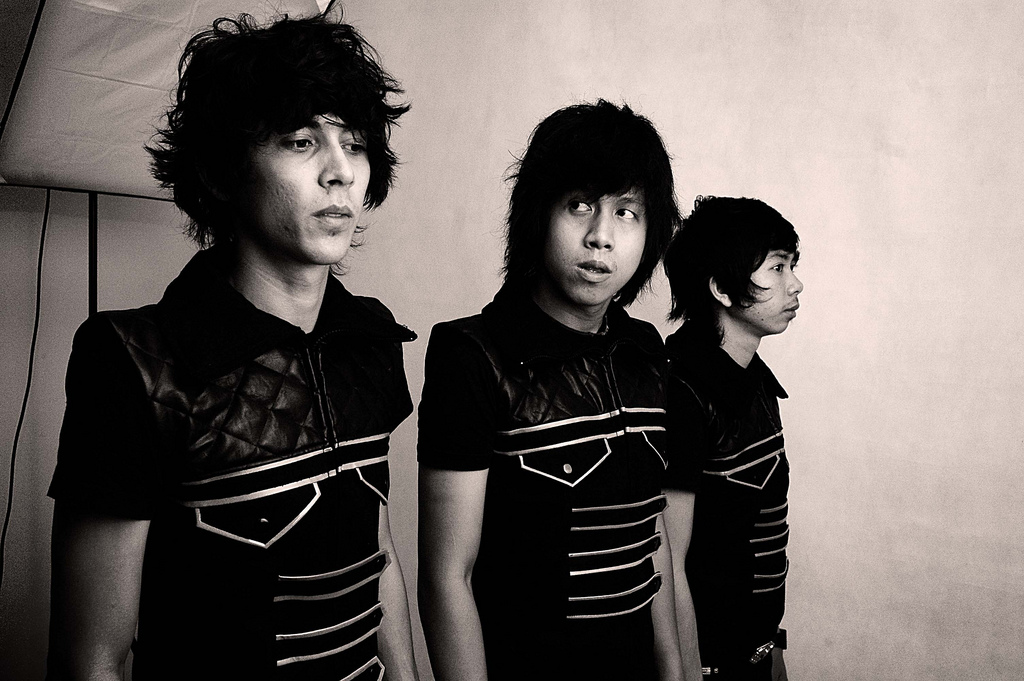
- From left to right: Sam, Youk, and Paan

Background information
- Origin: Klang, Malaysia
- Genres: Punk rock, pop punk, alternative rock, pop rock, pop
- Years active: 2005–present
- Labels: Bunkface Production, Sony Music Entertainment
- Members: Sam; Youk; Paan; Biak
- Website: www.facebook.com/bunkfaceband/

Bunkface is a Malaysian rock band formed in 2006. The band consists of lead vocalist and rhythm guitarist Sam (Shamsul Anuar), bass guitarist Youk (Farouk Jaafar), lead guitarist Paan (Ahmad Farhan), and drummer Biak (Alif Sufian). The name Bunkface was suggested by Biak which was influenced by the Sum 41 song "Crazy Amanda Bunkface". Popular songs by Bunkface include "Silly Lily", "Situasi", "Revolusi", "Prom Queen", "Through My Window", "Ekstravaganza", "Panik", "Rentak Laguku", "Malam Ini Kita Punya", "Darah Muda" and "Masih Di Sini". Their fanbase are called "Bunkers".

== Biography ==
Bunkface began as a group of four friends from SMK Sri Andalas who enjoyed casual jam sessions in [[Klang (city)}|Klang]], Selangor. The band's name, "Bunkface", was inspired by the Canadian band Sum 41's song "Crazy Amanda Bunkface" and suggested by their drummer, Biak.

=== Early recognition (2006–2007) ===
In March 2006, Bunkface won first place at the Band Rakan Seni Budaya competition organized by Universiti Malaya, which marked their debut media feature in ROTTW music magazine. This achievement introduced them to Malaysia's underground music scene. During this time, they also connected with Demoplanet.tv, a platform that provided sponsorships and helped produce their first music video. Later that year, they participated in the reality competition Blast Off, gaining broader recognition.

In December 2007, Bunkface released their debut EP Lesson of the Season, a collection of six English tracks blending pop-punk and alternative rock. The hit single "Silly Lily" dominated the [[Hitz (radio station)}|hitz.fm]] Malaysian Top Ten chart for eight weeks and the Fly.fm Campur Chart for 10 weeks. Their first Malay-language single, "Situasi", reached #1 on XFresh FM’s chart and #3 on Era FM’s chart for three consecutive weeks.

=== Breakthrough years (2008–2009) ===
In 2009, the band won the Rockstar, Breakout, and The Ultimate Shout! awards at the inaugural Shout! Awards. These achievements earned them an invitation to perform at the One Movement For Music festival in Perth, Australia—their first international performance.

=== Rise to stardom (2010) ===
In March 2010, Bunkface released their first full-length album, Phobia Phoney, featuring a mix of Malay and English tracks, including hits like "Situasi", "Revolusi", "Prom Queen", and "Soldier". They also gained massive popularity with the Telekom Malaysia campaign song "Through My Window".

=== MTV World Stage and side projects ===
Bunkface represented Malaysia at the MTV World Stage Live in Malaysia 2010, held on 31 July 2010 at Surf Beach, Sunway Lagoon, Selangor, sharing the stage with international artists such as Katy Perry, Tokio Hotel, and Wonder Girls.

Later, Sam, the band’s frontman, formed a side project called The Azenders in mid-2010 together with musicians from other Malaysian bands, including Izal (bass, from One Buck Short), Ajam (synth/strings, from Dichi Michi), and Kudut (drums, from Robot Asmara). The Azenders released their debut single "Ladies & Gentlemen", followed by a Malay-language track titled "Peribadi".

=== 2011–2013: Panik, controversy, and international tours ===
In September 2011, Bunkface released the single "Panik," which was banned by Malaysian state broadcaster RTM due to the use of the word "Reformasi" in its lyrics. Despite the controversy, the band continued to pursue their musical career.

They went on to perform at the Hong Kong Asian Music Festival (HKAMF), representing Malaysia, where they advanced to the finals and finished in third place.

The festival, organized by the IFPI in Hong Kong, was held at the Hong Kong Convention and Exhibition Centre and involved six countries across Asia: China, Taiwan, Singapore, South Korea, Malaysia, and the host Hong Kong. Japan was originally expected to participate but withdrew due to the unstable domestic situation following the 2011 earthquake and tsunami. In the preliminary round, Bunkface performed the song "Escape Dance" and competed against artists such as Wu Qiong (China), Kewei (Singapore), and The Boss (South Korea).

In the final, the contestants were asked to perform a popular international song of their choice. Bunkface selected "We Are the Champions" by Queen, which earned them third place overall for stage presence and vocal performance. Their participation placed them on par with other popular Asian artists and impressed both audiences and judges.

Around the same period, Bunkface released their second studio album, which contained 13 tracks, including nine in English and four in Malay. The band also toured Indonesia, performing at events such as the Jakarta Urbanfest 2011 and Hard Rock Cafe Jakarta, further expanding their popularity in Southeast Asia.

They also appeared on the popular Indonesian talk show Bukan Empat Mata, where they performed their hit single "Situasi." Before Bunkface, only Siti Nurhaliza and Amy Search from Malaysia had appeared on the show. Their tour in Indonesia was supported by sponsorship from AirAsia and Jamu Mak Dara, which also facilitated coverage by Malaysian media during their activities in Jakarta.

=== Celebrating milestones (2014–2016) ===
Their third album, Malam Ini Kita Punya, was released in 2014 under Sony Music Entertainment.

In 2015, Bunkface became one of the few Malaysian bands to perform at the renowned Summer Sonic Festival in Japan. The festival is known for featuring world-class artists. Their participation was regarded as a significant milestone in the band’s career, marking their presence on the international stage and helping to introduce Malaysian rock music to a global audience.

At the 2015 edition, Bunkface shared the stage with a diverse lineup of international stars, including Ariana Grande, Pharrell Williams, Imagine Dragons, The Script, Carly Rae Jepsen, Clean Bandit, All Time Low, and Babymetal. According to the Summer Sonic 2015 official lineup, Bunkface appeared in the "Asian Calling" segment alongside other Southeast Asian acts such as Caracal (Singapore) and The Steve McQueens (Singapore).

The band celebrated their 10th anniversary in 2016 with a major concert, Bunkface X Live in Kuala Lumpur, at Chin Woo Stadium, where they launched a compilation album of their greatest hits.

=== National pride (2018–2019) ===
In 2018, Bunkface composed the official theme song for Malaysia’s National Day, "Kita Punya Malaysia". The following year, they released their fourth album, POP, and performed at music festivals in Indonesia (Road to Soundrenaline Indonesia and Big Bang Jakarta Music Festival).

=== Recent years (2022–2024) ===
In 2022, Bunkface celebrated their 15th anniversary with a two-night concert, 15 Years of Korang, drawing over 10,000 fans. In 2023, they performed in Borneo with their Rock In Borneo solo concert in Kota Kinabalu, Sabah.

In 2024, Bunkface returned to Dewan Filharmonik Petronas (DFP) for a solo concert featuring 20 of their hits.

== Musical style and influences ==
Bunkface considers their music as pop punk, and they have cited Sum 41, Green Day, Blink 182, Fall Out Boy, The Offspring, Simple Plan, Good Charlotte, Yellowcard and Nofx as their main influences.

== Controversies ==
In 2020, Bunkface stirred controversy over homophobic lyrics in their song "Akhir Zaman" ("The End of Times"). The lyrics urge the LGBT community to "go and die". Following the release of the song, there was an uproar in Malaysia's LGBT community. The band issued a statement on Instagram on March 6, 2020, where they referred to the Quran to defend their anti-LGBT lyrics.

In 2025, Bunkface was dropped as the opening act for American rock band, Green Day, in a concert in Kuala Lumpur. Their cancellation was purportedly due to 'logistical' issues, but some local Green Day fans rejoiced.

== Music videos ==
- Our Way
- Hyper Killer (2007)
- Silly Lilly (2007)
- Bunk Anthem (2008)
- Prom Queen (2009)
- Through My Window (2009)
- Ekstravaganza (2010)
- Revolusi (2010)
- Dunia (2011)
- Situasi (2011)
- Panik (2012)
- Anugerah Syawal (2013)
- Anugerah Syawal (Media Prima ft Idola Kecil Ultra) (2014)
- Rentak Laguku (2014)
- Malam Ini Kita Punya (2014)
- Darah Muda (2015)
- Huawei Best Wei (2015)
- Masih Di Sini (2016)
- Warnai Dunia (2016)
- Shopping is Forever (Bunkface & Kaka Azraff) (2017)
- Dunia Baru (2017)
- Orang Kita (ft Amir Jahari) (Lyric Video) (2017)
- Kembalii (2017)
- Apa Pun Tak Boleh ft Datuk Jeffrydin & Caprice (2018)
- Kita Punya Malaysia (2018) – Malaysia National Day Official Song
- Shiver (2018)
- Setiap Malam Aku Bersamamu (Lyric Video) (2019)
- Suara (2019)
- Akhir Zaman (Lyric Video) (2020)
- Tolong (2020)
- Yang Benar, Aku (2020)
- Sentiasa Bersamamu (2021)
- Korang (2022)
- I Miss You (2022)
- REMP-IT (2022)
- Toxicated (2023)
- Malaysia Madani (2023)
- HILANG (2024)
- Memberontak (2024)
- Hitch a Ride (Announced and sang in “15 Years of Korang” concert)
- We’re Gonna Be Alright (announced)
- Aku Amy (TikTok Announcement)
- Untitled (announced)

== Band members ==
=== Current members ===
- Sam – lead vocal, rhythm guitar (2006–present)
- Youk – backing vocal, bass (2006–present)
- Paan – lead guitar, backing vocal (2006–present)
- Biak - Drummer (2006-2007, hiatus, 2022-present)

=== Former members ===
- Jabariah – bass ( 2005–2006)

=== Touring and session members ===
- Ejam Coda – Drums, percussion (2008–2012)
- Gjie 6ixth Sense (band) 6ixth Sense – keyboards, synthesizers (2009–2011)
- Wawa – Keyboards, synthesizers (2010–2012)
- Wan 6ixth Sense – drums and percussion (Bunk Not Dead Tour 2013–2015)
- Ainol – drums and percussion ( 2015–2022 )
- Ajam – Rhythm guitar, keyboards, synthesizers, backing vocals (2013–present)
- Izzie Musa - Keyboards, synthesizers (2017-2020)

=== Bunkids members ===
- Maleeq
- Umar
- Safiya
- Idris
- Maryam
- Paul

== Discography ==
=== EP ===
- Lesson of the Season (2007)

=== Album ===
- Phobia Phoney (2010)
- Bunk Not Dead (2012)
- Malam Ini Kita Punya (2014)
- Bunkface X (2016)
- POP (2019)
- unnamed punk rock album (announced to be released in 2020, delayed)

== Awards and nominations ==
Bunkface awards and nominations
Awards and nominations
Award	Wins	Nominations

Totals (Note: Certain award groups do not simply award one winner. They acknowledge several different recipients, have runners-up, and have third place. Since this is a specific recognition and is different from losing an award, runner-up mentions are considered wins in this award tally. For simplification and to avoid errors, each award in this list has been presumed to have had a prior nomination.)
- Wins: 15
- Nominations: 30

- 2009 Shout! Awards: Rockstar Awards, Break Out Award, as well as The Ultimate Shout! Award.
- 2009 Anugerah Juara Lagu: Finalist (for the song Situasi)
- 2009 AVIMA Awards : Best College Act
- 2010 Anugerah Bintang Popular 2009 : Most Popular Duo / Group
- 2010 Anugerah Industri Muzik: Kembara Award & Best Rock Song (for the song Situasi)
- 2010 Shout! Awards : Rockstar Award and Best music video (for the song "Prom Queen")
- 2010 Anugerah Juara Lagu 25 : Finalist (for the song "Ekstravaganza")
- 2011 Shout! Awards : Rockstar Awards
- 2011 HK Asia Music Festival : 3rd place
- 2011 Komposer Muda Berbakat MACP : Sam (Young Composer under 25 years old)
- 2012 Shout! Awards : Rockstar Award
- 2013 Shout! Awards : Rockstar Award
- 2014 Shout! Awards : Rockstar Award
- 2014 Anugerah Industri Muzik : Best Rock Song (Rentak Laguku ft Amy Search)
- 2014 Anugerah Juara Lagu : Finalist (Rentak Laguku ft Amy Search)
- 2015 Anugerah Juara Lagu : Finalist (Malam Ini Kita Punya)
- MTV EMA 2016: Bunkface was nominated for Best SEA Artist at the MTV EMA 2016

=== 2011 Hong Kong Asia Music Festival ===
Finalist: 3rd Place

=== 2011 Komposer Muda Berbakat MACP ===
won: Sam (young composer)

=== 2016 MTV Europe Music Awards ===
Bunkface nominated in Best SEA Artist at the MTV EMA 2016

=== Anugerah Industri Muzik ===
Year	Category	Songs	Album	Result	Lost to
2010 (AIM17)	Best New Artist			Nominated	Yuna
2010 (AIM17)	Best English Song	Prom Queen	Phobia Phoney	Nominated	Yuna - Deeper Conversation
2010 (AIM17)	Best Rock Song	Situasi	Phobia Phoney	Won	
2010 (AIM17)	Best Song	Situasi	Phobia Phoney	Nominated	Yuna - Dan Sebenarnya
2010 (AIM17)	Anugerah Kembara ("International Achievement Award")			Won	
2011 (AIM18)	Best Rock Song	Extravaganza	Phobia Phoney	Nominated	A.P.I. - Pelita
2013 (AIM20)	Best Rock Song	Panik	Bunk Not Dead	Nominated	Amy Search - Di Bawah Gerbang Skaea
2014 (AIM21)	Best Rock Song	Rentak Laguku	Malam Ini kita Punya	Won	
2022 (AIM23)	Best Rock Song	Korang		Nominated	Tugu Ugut - Sekumpulan Orang Gila
2022 (AIM23)	Best Rock Song	I Miss You		Nominated	Tugu Ugut - Sekumpulan Orang Gila

=== Anugerah Juara Lagu (AJL) (Song of the Year) ===
- Kumpulan Exist, Akim & The Majistret and Bunkface are the music groups that have most frequently reached the finals of Juara Lagu, with 4 participations each.

Bunkface in Anugerah Juara Lagu:
1. Anugerah Juara Lagu 2009 - "Situasi"
2. Anugerah Juara Lagu 2010 - "Ekstravaganza"
3. Anugerah Juara Lagu 2014 - "Rentak Laguku"
4. Anugerah Juara Lagu 2015 - "Malam Ini Kita Punya"

At the 2016 Anugerah Juara Lagu, Bunkface withdrew from the competition with their song Darah Muda.

=== Anugerah Bintang Popular Berita Harian ===
Year	Category	Result
2009	Popular Duo/Group Singer	Won
2010	Popular Duo/Group Singer	Nominated
2011	Popular Duo/Group Singer	Nominated
2018	Popular Duo/Group Singer	Nominated

=== Anugerah SHOUT! ===
Year	Category	Result
2009	Break Out Award	Won
2009	Rockstar Award	Won
2009	The Ultimate Shout! Award	Won
2010	Rockstar Award	Won
2010	Music Video Award	Won
2011	Rockstar Award	Won
2012	Rockstar Award	Won
2013	Rockstar Award	Won
2014	Rockstar Award	Won
