= AmBank =

Malaysia-based bank

AmBank Group Berhad

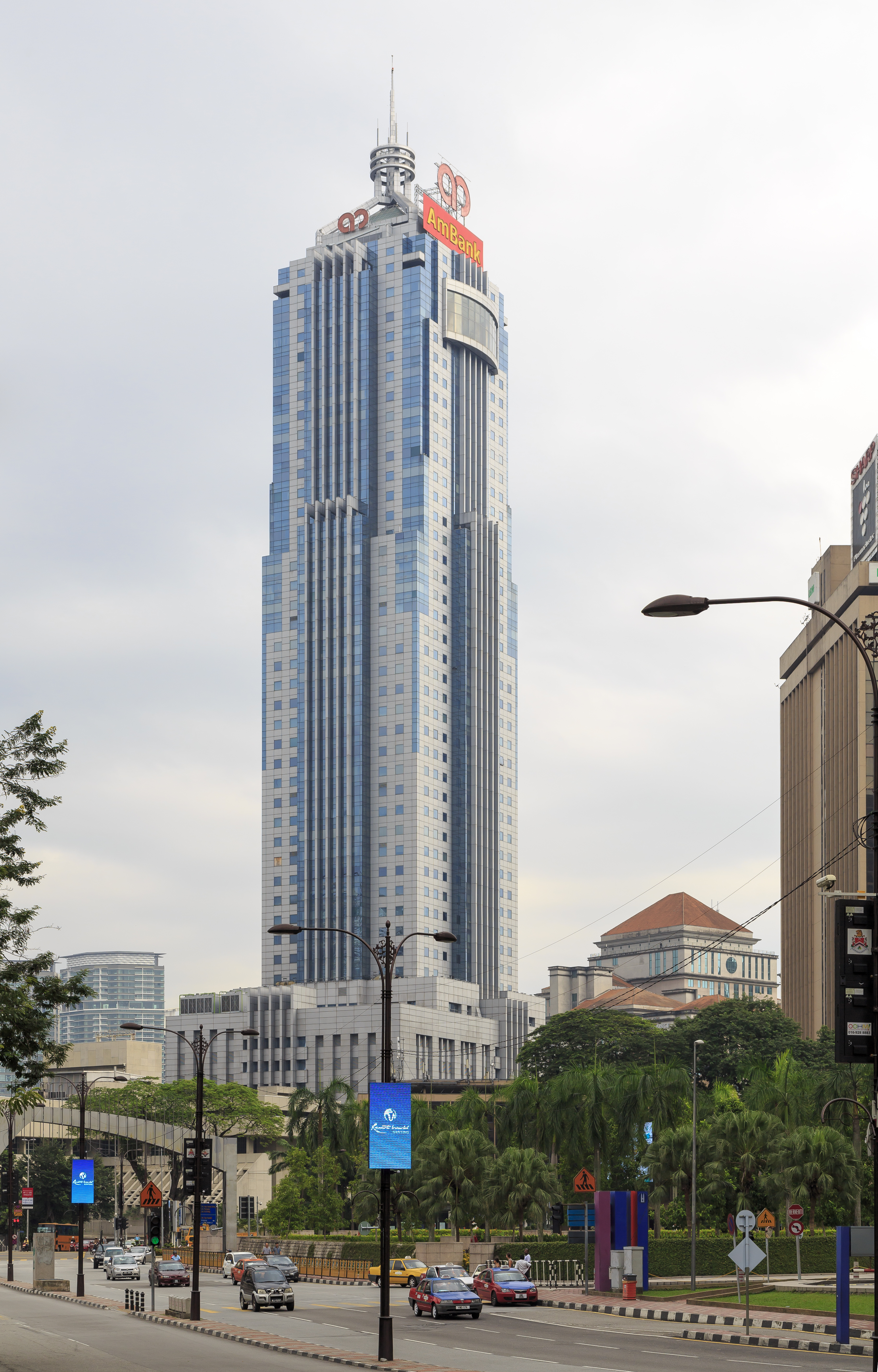
- Menara AmBank, AmBank's headquarters
- Company type: Public limited company
- Traded as: AMBANK 1015
- ISIN: MYL1015OO006
- Industry: Banking and Finance
- Founded: 1975; 51 years ago
- Founder: Hussain Najadi
- Headquarters: Kuala Lumpur, Malaysia
- Number of locations: Malaysia - 175 branches
- Area served: Personal banking services in Malaysia
- Key people: Voon Seng Chuan, Chairman; Jamie Ling Fou-Tsong, CEO
- Products: Banking and Finance Services
- Revenue: ▲RM9.324 Billion (Fiscal Year Ended 31 March 2020)
- Operating income: ▲RM 2.69 billion(2023); RM 2.57 billion(2022)
- Net income: ▲RM 1.74 billion(2023); RM 1.502 billion(2022)
- Total assets: ▲RM197.54 billion(2023); RM 174.86 billion(2022)
- Total equity: ▲RM18.135 billion(2023); RM 16.76 billion(2022)
- Number of employees: 7,652 (2025)
- Parent: Amcorp Group Berhad
- Rating: A3
- Website: www.ambankgroup.com

AmBank Group comprises AMMB Holdings Berhad (AMBANK 1015) is one of the largest banking groups in Malaysia whose core businesses are retail banking, wholesale banking, Islamic banking, and life and general insurance.

The Group trades under a number of brands, including AmBank, AmInvestment Bank, AmInvest, AmBank Islamic, AmGeneral Insurance and AmMetLife. AmBank, its key brand, covers its retail and wholesale banking businesses and is supported by a network of 175 branches and 766 ATM machines in Malaysia (as stated on its website).

The AmBank Group was founded in 1975 by Hussain Najadi, initially known as the Persian-Malaysian Development Bank.

Tan Sri Azman Hashim, the current group chairman, has an interest of 14.01% in AMMB Holdings as at 30 June 2014. The single largest shareholder in AMMB Holdings is Australia's ANZ Group with a stake of 23.78% as at 30 June 2014. In 2006, Amcorp's interest in AMMB was reduced to 18.8% from 32.9% after the Tan Sri Azman sold 300 million shares to ANZ Group.

Both domestically and abroad, it is known as the bank which was central to the 1MDB scandal, and its reputation has been tarnished as a result.

== History ==
1976

- The Group commenced operations on 1 April 1976 as a joint venture comprising Arab and Malaysian shareholders.

1977

- The Group acquired a 70.0% shareholding in Malaysian Industrial Finance Company Limited ("MIFCL"), which was later renamed Arab-Malaysian Finance Berhad ("AMFB").

1980

- AMMB co-lead managed the $200 million, 12-year Syndicated Term Loan for the Malaysian government.
- AMMB initiated the formation of Malaysian Kuwaiti Investment Company Sdn Bhd, a joint venture between Perbadanan Nasional Berhad and Kuwait Real Estate Investment Consortium and Public Institution for Social Security, Kuwait.
- AMMB acted as Adviser to Kuwait Real Estate Investment Consortium, Singapore.
- AMFB became the first private sector institution in Malaysia to issue public bonds – RM20.0 million 8.5% Guaranteed Bonds 1987, listed on the KLSE.

1982

- Y Bhg Tan Sri Dato' Azman Hashim acquired 100.0% shareholding in the Group.
- The Group acquired the remaining 30.0% shareholding of AMFB, making it a wholly owned finance company subsidiary.

1983

- The Group established a credit and leasing company, Arab-Malaysian Credit Berhad.

1984

- The Group launched the first venture capital company to undertake private equity investments – Malaysian Ventures Berhad.
- The Group arranged the first leveraged lease facility in the country for Sistem Televisyen Malaysia Berhad (TV3).
- AMMB completed its Government-assigned study on the privatisation of Jabatan Telekom.
- The Group acquired Arab-Malaysian Insurance Berhad, a general insurance company formerly known as Teguh Insurance Company Sdn Bhd.

1985

- The Group acquired Perima Assurance Berhad, a life insurance company. Both the life and general insurance companies were later merged in 1987, holding composite insurance licences, and the entity's name changed to Arab-Malaysian Eagle Assurance Berhad (now known as AmAssurance Berhad).

1986

- The Group acquired a stockbroking firm, Kris Securities Sdn Bhd, later renamed as AmSecurities Sdn Bhd.
- The Group relocated to its corporate headquarters at Jalan Raja Chulan.
- In December 1986, Antah Holdings Berhad and the Tokai Bank Limited, Japan acquired 20.0% shareholding each in the Group.
- Launched Arab-Malaysian Unit Trusts Berhad, to manage unit trust funds.

1987

- On 22 January 1987, AMMB launched the first unit trust to invest 90.0% in Malaysian Government securities, called the Arab-Malaysian Gilts, to provide tax-exempt income to individual investors on their short term funds.
- In July, AMMB launched the AMIGOS (Arab-Malaysian Individuals' Government Securities) programme to enable retail investors to invest in government securities.
- AMMB sponsored the establishment of The Malaysia Fund Inc, a close-ended investment fund listed on the New York Stock Exchange, to invest in equities of Malaysian companies listed on the KLSE. The Malaysia Fund raised US$87.0 million.

1988

- AMMB became the first merchant bank to be listed on the KLSE.
- AMMB was appointed as Adviser to the Government to formulate the National Privatisation Masterplan.
- AMMB launched the first equity unit trust fund, called the Arab-Malaysian First Fund.

1989

- On 21 April 1989, AMMB together with the Nikko Securities Co. Ltd Tokyo and the International Finance Corporation, Washington launched a US dollar-denominated unit trust fund, The Malaysia Growth Fund, aimed primarily at Japanese investors.
- On 28 September 1989, the Arab-Malaysian Property Trust became the first property trust to be listed on the KLSE.

1990

- AMMB was appointed as Adviser and Managing Underwriter for the flotation of Telekom Malaysia Berhad.
- AMFB acquired First Malaysia Finance Berhad.

1991

- In July 1991, the Group acquired a 49.0% equity stake in Fraser International Pte Ltd, the holding company of Fraser Securities, Singapore.
- AMMB, in collaboration with The Nikko Securities Co. Ltd. in Japan, sponsored the establishment of Malaysia Fund (Labuan), the first offshore unit trust fund in the Federal Territory of Labuan.
- Incorporation of AMMB Holdings Berhad, as the vehicle for the implementation of a corporate restructuring scheme. Pursuant to the restructuring scheme, AMMB Holdings Berhad became the holding company of the Arab-Malaysian Banking Group, and assumed the listing status of AMMB.
- Arab-Malaysian Finance Berhad, the Group's finance company, was listed on the KLSE.
- Establishment of AMMB Labuan (L) Ltd to provide offshore funds management.

1992

- AMMB Holdings Berhad won the Asian Management Award for Financial Management from Asian Institute of Management.

1993

- AMMB launched Tabung Ittikal Arab-Malaysian, the first Islamic Unit Trust Fund on 12 January 1993.
- AMMB was Co-Manager of General Electric Corporation's $300 million Dragon Bonds Issue.
- AMMB acted as Manager and Arranger for the RM240.0 million Syndicated Credit Facility for the construction of Menara Kuala Lumpur.

1994

- On 1 August 1994, the Group ventured into commercial banking with the acquisition of the Malaysian operations of Security Pacific Asian Bank Limited from Bank of America (Asia) Limited. Commencement of commercial banking operations under Arab-Malaysian Bank Berhad.

1995

- On 1 April 1995, AMMB International (L) Ltd commenced offshore banking operations in Labuan, the first merchant bank to offer offshore banking services.
- AMMB Futures Sdn Bhd commenced futures broking business.

1996

- AMMB Holdings Berhad's annual report won the "Overall Award for the Most Outstanding Annual Report" for six consecutive years from 1991 to 1996 in the NACRA competition.
- Macquarie Bank Limited, Australia acquired 30.0% shareholding in AMMB Futures Sdn Bhd.
- Macquarie Bank Limited, Australia acquired 30.0% shareholding in AMMB Asset Management Sdn Bhd and Arab-Malaysian Unit Trusts Berhad.
- The 1996 Far Eastern Economic Review Survey of Asia's 200 Leading Companies ranked AMMB first in the overall category of "Innovative in Responding to Customer Needs" and third in terms of "Overall Leadership".
- Visa International awarded the AmBank Al-Taslif VISA Card the "1996 Member Excellence Award for the Most Creative Card Programme in Asia".

1997

- AMMB Securities (HK) Limited commenced stockbroking operations in Hong Kong.
- The Group's website was awarded the "Internet Website of the Year" for 1997 by the Association of Computer Industry Malaysia ("PIKOM").

1998

- AMFB acquired the assets and liabilities of Abrar Finance Berhad, in line with the Government's plan to consolidate the industry.
- AMMB received the "Derivatives OTC National Award" from Malaysian Monetary Exchange Berhad.

2000

- CFO Asia selected AMMB Holdings Bhd Annual Report FY 2000, as one of the top three annual reports in Malaysia.

== Recent ==
2001

- AMFB acquired MBF Finance Berhad.
- AmBank, AMFB, and the Selangor state government launched Tabung Perumahan Ehsan, a special housing loan scheme for the lower-income group in the State.

2002

- Merger of Arab-Malaysian Finance Berhad and MBf Finance Berhad, following the vesting of the assets and liabilities of AMFB into MBf Finance Berhad. MBf Finance Berhad changed its name to AmFinance Berhad. AMFB was converted into a holding company.
- Re-branding and changing of the name from "Arab-Malaysian Banking Group" to "AmBank Group" with new Group corporate colours of red and yellow

2003

- Bangunan AmFinance, now known as Menara AmBank, was officially launched by Mahathir Mohamad, who was Malaysia's Prime Minister at the time

2005

- Completed privatisation of AMFB Holdings Berhad.
- Listed AmInvestment Group Berhad ("AIGB") on Bursa Malaysia on 18 May 2005, the Group's investment banking operations.
- On 1 June 2005, the merger of AmBank and AmFinance took place to create AmBank (M) Berhad, the sixth-largest domestic bank in the country.

2006

- In January 2006, AmPrivate Equity, a private equity fund, was launched.
- On 10 March 2006, Insurance Australia Group Limited acquired 30% shareholding in AmAssurance Berhad.
- On 20 April 2006, Am ARA REIT Managers Sdn Bhd was incorporated with AIGB holding 70% equity and ARA Asset Management (Malaysia) Limited 30%, to manage the AmFIRST REIT to be listed on Bursa Malaysia.
- On 1 June 2006, AmIslamic Bank commenced operations, with the vesting of the Islamic assets and liabilities of AmBank (M) Berhad into a separate subsidiary company.
- On 21 December 2006, AmFIRST REIT listed on Bursa Malaysia.
- The AmInvestment Group was awarded seven RAM League Awards by Rating Agency Malaysia for its outstanding achievements in the domestic bond market.

2007

- The AmBank Group completed the integration exercise of AmSecurities Sdn Bhd into AmInvestment Bank on 3 March 2007. The AmInvestment Bank began operating as a full-fledged investment bank effective 5 March 2007, offering both merchant banking and stockbroking services.
- On 18 May 2007, AmBank Group commemorated the entry of Australia and New Zealand Banking Group Limited as its strategic partner and major investor.
- On 19 June 2007, AMMB Holdings Berhad proposed the privatisation of AIGB and the proposed rights issue of up to 326,887,241 new shares, on the basis of one new share for every eight existing ordinary shares and every eight Converting Preference Share in the company at an issue price of RM3.40 per share.
- The signing of a Memorandum of Understanding ("MOU") between AmInvestment Bank Berhad and Woori Investment & Securities Co Ltd, on 29 November 2007 to promote the parties mutual interests for co-operation in the investment banking business.

2008

- Completed the AMMB Holdings Berhad ("AMMB") rights issue and privatisation of AIGB on 15 January 2008, with AIGB effectively becoming a wholly owned subsidiary of AMMB.
- Completed the transfer of the Fund Based Activities of AmInvestment Bank to AmBank (M) Berhad and AmIslamic

Bank Berhad on 12 April 2008 as part of AMMB's internal corporate restructuring post the AIGB privatisation.

- Establishment of AmG Insurance Berhad to facilitate the separation of the composite insurance business of AmAssurance Berhad into general insurance and life insurance business.
- Malaysian Ventures Management Incorporated Sdn Bhd ("MVMI"), the private equity fund management subsidiary of AMMB, entered into a joint venture agreement with Konzen Capital Pte Ltd, a member of Konzen Group, to manage a $320 million Pioneering Water Fund in Asia.
- AmBank and ANZ enter into a technical services agreement to establish the AmBank Group foreign exchange, interest rate and commodities derivatives business.
- Islamic Stockbroking (window service) launched under the brand of AmIslamic, the universal brand of Islamic products and services across all subsidiaries of the AmBank Group.
- On 9 December 2008, Friends Provident plc acquired 30.0% stake in AmLife Insurance Berhad (formerly AmAssurance Berhad).
- IAG increased its stakeholding in AmG Insurance Berhad from 30.0% to 49.0%.

2009

- AmIslamic Funds Management Sdn Bhd obtains license for Islamic funds management from the Securities Commission to carry out management of offshore and domestic Islamic financial instruments for institutional and retail investors.
- AmCapital (B) Sdn Bhd officially opened on 11 May 2009, bringing funds management, Islamic finance and investment advisory to Brunei Darussalam.

2013

- On 29 July 2013, AmBank founder Hussain Ahmad Najadi was shot dead near the headquarters. A tow truck driver, Koong Swee Kwan, allegedly kills him over suspicious parking lure dispute.

2017

- Proposal merger between RHB Bank and AmBank Group.
- Ambank Not Selling Off Its General Insurance Business: CEO Tahir.

2018

- On 25 September 2018, AmBank Group and Malaysian Administrative Modernisation and Management Planning Unit were recognised at the Red Hat Forum Kuala Lumpur, "for their outstanding and innovative use of Red Hat solutions".

2019

- On 1 January 2019, AMMB Holdings Bhd appointed Voon Seng Chuan as AmBank (M) Bhd's new chairman, replacing Azman Hashim.

== See also ==
- AmBank Tower
- AmMetLife
- List of banks in Malaysia
- Malaysian Electronic Payment System
- NexG PrePaid
- OCBC bank
