= Noh Salleh =

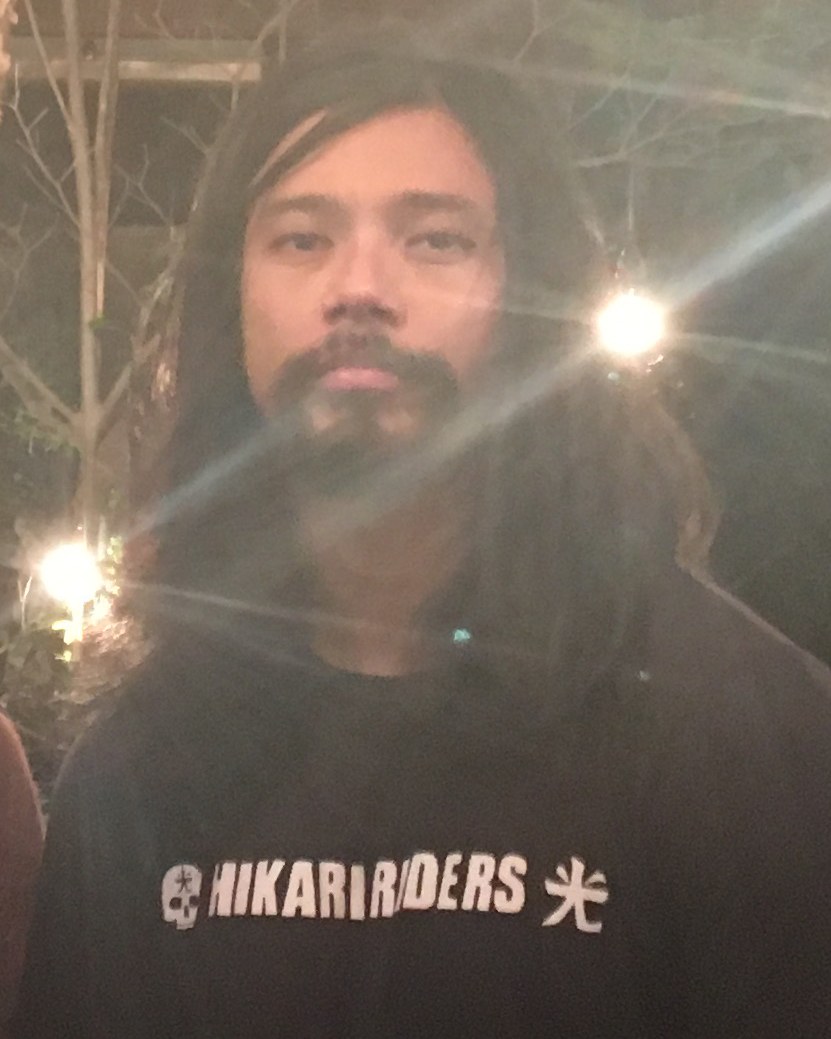
- Noh Salleh in 2019
- Born: 15 March 1985 (age 41); Kuching, Sarawak, Malaysia
- Occupations: Musician; singer; songwriter; record producer
- Spouses: Mizz Nina (m. 2011; div. 2022) Fatin Athirah Mustapa (m. 2023)
- Musical career
- Genre: Rock
- Instruments: Vocals; guitar
- Years active: 2005–present
- Labels: Noh Phrofile Enterprise; Hujan Selaseh Sdn Bhd
- Website: hikaririders.com

Mohammad Noh bin Salleh (born 15 March 1985) is a Malaysian singer-songwriter, musician, and record producer. He is best known as the frontman and principal songwriter of the rock band Hujan, who have released six studio albums. He has also recorded with his side project EP, "Angin Kencang" and "Debu Bercahaya" as a solo artist.

== Early life ==
Born in Kuching and raised in Miri, Sarawak, Noh moved to Kuala Lumpur and worked as an assistant in a recording studio owned by Ahmad Idham. In between music sessions, he taught himself musical knowledge and asked the musicians about jazz chords that interested him.

== Music career ==
=== Band ===
Noh began his music career as a hip hop singer with the group MIX with three of his friends; Asyraf Hardy, MC Wayne and Ogie. The group signed a contract with the Cat Presents Productions recording label owned by Cat Farish and appeared with their only studio album Mula Dari Dulu in 2006. MIX was later disbanded as Noh was starting his own band.

Hujan began forming in 2005 after Noh uploaded some of his demos to Myspace, which was later discovered by AG Coco who introduce him to bigger audience in music scene. In earlier stage of Hujan, they were heavily influenced by jazz and rock in songwriting. Noh Salleh and Hang Dimas played their first gig on 17 February 2006 at Malam Pesta Gagalis Ubu in Lost Generation Space as Hujan.

He began his career with Hujan in 2005, along with guitarist AG Coco, who became a dominant figure in the independent music scene. Their self-titled debut album Hujan in 2008, became the fastest-selling debut album in Malaysia history, with massive success from the singles "Pagi yang Gelap" and "Bila Aku Sudah Tiada".

=== Solo career ===
Noh debuted his solo work Angin Kencang in July 2014. The album was mainly inspired by his then-wife Mizz Nina with elements of 1960s and 1970s French popular music; and it was co-produced with Adink Permana, Ade Paloh and Mondo Gascaro from the Indonesian band Sore.

=== Recent Releases ===
In 2024, Noh Salleh released the single “Rahsia Tuhan,” which served as the original soundtrack for the Malaysian film Babah. The song, inspired by personal experiences of loss, resonated deeply with audiences and achieved significant chart success in Malaysia.

In January 2025, he released another single titled “Nirmala,” continuing his exploration of personal and emotive themes in his music.

== Personal life ==
Noh Salleh married Malaysian singer and television personality Mizz Nina on 1 July 2011. The couple announced on their Instagram that they had separated on 4 August 2022.

== Discography ==
=== M.I.X ===
- Mula Dari Dulu (2006)

=== Hujan ===
- 1, 2, 3, Go! (2007)
- Check Check Rock Rock (2007)
- Hujan (2008)
- Mencari Konklusi (2009)
- Lonely Soldier Boy (2010)
- Sang Enemy (2012)
- Jika Sempat (2016)
- Suria (2018)
- Pelangi & Kau (2020)

=== Da Vagabonds ===
- Da Vagabonds (2014)

=== Solo ===
- Angin Kencang (2014)
- Debu Bercahaya (2019)
- Bisikan (2020)
- Rahsia Tuhan (2024)
- Nirmala (2025)

=== Other collaborations ===
- "Hantu" with M.I.X – (2006)
- "Puteri Santubong" with M.I.X – (2006)
- "Akademi Cinta" featuring Nas Adila with M.I.X – (2006)
- "Pelita" featuring A.P.I – Hooperz (2010)
- "Kurnia" featuring Mizz Nina – What Are You Waiting For (2010)
- "Selamat Pagi Sayang" featuring DJ Fuzz – Mixtape Mixology 3 (2010)
- "Kotarayaku" featuring Altimet – Kotarayaku (2011)
- "Senandung Harapan" featuring Feby Putri – (2026)
