= Hujan =

Malaysian indie rock band

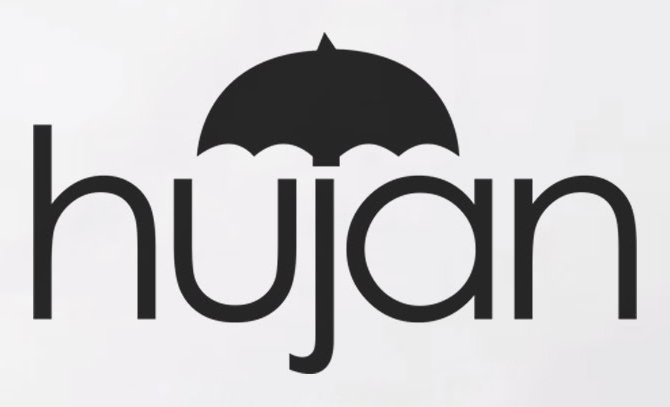

Background information
- Origin: Miri & Kuala Lumpur, Malaysia
- Genres: Alternative rock
- Years active: 2005–present
- Labels: Noh Phrofile Enterprise; Hujan Selaseh Sdn Bhd; FMC Music Sdn Bhd
- Members: Noh Salleh; AG Coco; Azham Ahmad (Ambobzeela/Am); Izzat Uzaini
- Past members: Hang Dimas; Nazeri Nazirul (Dukegong); Azhar Imran (Jaja)
- Website: hikaririders.com

Hujan ("Rain") is a Malaysian indie rock band formed in Kuala Lumpur, in 2005. It was founded by vocalist Noh Salleh and lead guitarist AG Coco. Fans of Hujan are called Raingers.

Hujan released its first two EPs in 2007, 1, 2, 3, Go! and Check Check Rock Rock, released by independent record label Noh Phrofile Enterprise. Hujan found mainstream success and strength of radio airplay with Pagi Yang Gelap, a single from 1, 2, 3, Go!. It was popular on indie radio stations such as X FM.

They have released six studio albums, as well as one live album, Live at Planet Hollywood (2009).

Noh Hujan, the frontman of Hujan, has released his own music projects under his real name, Noh Salleh.

== History ==
In 2005, Noh Salleh uploaded a few demos as a personal solo project onto Myspace. AG Coco, who at the time was a music student, contacted Noh to perform his songs as study material.

Noh Salleh and Hang Dimas played their first gig on 17 February 2006 at Malam Pesta Gagalis Ubu in Lost Generation Space as Hujan. The band released their first two EPs, 1, 2, 3, Go! and Check Check Rock Rock both in 2007. Hujan won Best Rock Album and Best Rock Song on Anugerah Industri Muzik in 2009.

In September 2009, Noh Salleh invited Izzat Uzaini to join Hujan through a text message, who was looking for a new bassist for Mencari Konklusi Tour.

== Band members ==
Current members

- Noh Salleh – vocals, rhythm guitar (2005–present)
- AG Coco – lead guitar, producer (2005–present)
- Azham Ahmad – drums (2005–present)
- Izzat Uzaini – bass (2009–present)

Former members

- Hang Dimas – keyboard
- Azhar Imran "Jaja" – bass
- Nazeri Nazirul "Dukegong" – bass

Timeline

== Discography ==
=== Studio albums ===
- Hujan (2008)
- Mencari Konklusi (2009)
- Lonely Soldier Boy (2010)
- Sang Enemy (2012)
- Jika Sempat (2016)
- Pelangi Dan Kau (2020)

=== EP ===
- 1, 2, 3, Go! (2007)
- Check Check Rock Rock (2007)
- Hujan UK Release (2008)
- Suria (2018)
- Pelangi Dan Kau (2020)

=== Original soundtracks ===
- Jiwa Kelajuan (OST Impak Maksima)
- Bahgia (OST Kisah Cinta)

=== Compilations ===
- CD Issue-9 Majalah JUNK: Pagi Yang Gelap
- Support Our Local Act Volume 1: Bila Aku Sudah Tiada

== Awards and nominations ==
Anugerah Planet Muzik
Year	Category	Song	Album	Result
2009	Best Vocal Performances on Song for Duo/New Band	Pagi Yang Gelap	Hujan	Nominated
2009	Duo / Best Band		Hujan	Nominated
2009	Best Song	Pagi Yang Gelap	Hujan	Nominated
2009	Best Album		Hujan	Nominated
2009	Most Popular Malaysian Artist			Nominated
2009	Most Popular Regional Artist			Nominated
2011	Most Popular Regional Artist			Nominated

Anugerah Juara Lagu (AJL)
Year	Song	Album	Category	Result
2009 (AJL24)	Aku Skandal	Hujan	Open	Nominated
2010 (AJL25)	Mencari Konklusi	Mencari Konklusi	Open	Nominated

Anugerah Bintang Popular Berita Harian (ABPBH)
Year	Category	Result
2008	Penyanyi Berkumpulan / Duo Popular	Nominated
2009	Penyanyi Duo / Berkumpulan Popular	Nominated

Shout! Awards
Year	Category	Result
2009	Break Out Award	Nominated
2009	Rockstar Award	Nominated
2010	Rockstar Award	Nominated
