= Rebirth Into Reality =

Studio album by Too Phat
- Released: 22 September 2005
- Recorded: 2004 – 2005
- Studios: Platinum Studios; A System Studios
- Genres: Hip-hop; rap
- Length: 147:40
- Labels: Kartel Records; EMI Music Malaysia
- Producers: Malique; Joe Flizzow

Too Phat chronology
| Too Phat Classics (2004) | Rebirth Into Reality (2005) | Too Phat Too Furious (2007) |

Singles from Rebirth Into Reality
- 1. "Snap" Released: 2005; 2. "Dua Dunia" Released: 2005; 3. "Million Miles" Released: 2006; 4. "How Me Seksi" Released: 2006

Rebirth Into Reality is a fourth and final studio album by the Malaysian hip-hop duo, Too Phat, released on 22 September 2005 by Kartel Records and EMI Music Malaysia. It is their first studio album with Kartel Records, a record label set up by the duo member Joe Flizzow, after having signed with Positive Tone and it is also their first album to use the new Too Phat logo. The album features a collaboration with numerous Asian artists including Siti Nurhaliza, Inul Daratista, Kyla, Joey Boy and Machi. An international edition of the album was released in 2006, while its remastered version was released in 2020.

== Production ==
Rebirth Into Reality is heavily influenced by Too Phat. They become the album's producer, replacing Ahmad Izham Omar and Greg Henderson, who co-produced their first three albums. The duo decided on a collaboration with numerous artists from six Asian countries, eventually working with Siti Nurhaliza (Malaysia), Alicia Pan and Junior Kim (Singapore), Inul Daratista (Indonesia), Kyla (Philippines) and Joey Boy (Thailand) as well as Machi (Taiwan).

Upon Too Phat's request, EMI Music Malaysia contacted Siti Nurhaliza to be their duet partner for the song "Dua Dunia" and its English version, "Million Miles". Although Siti was surprised to be asked and was under contract with Suria Records, she accepted the offer. "How Me Seksi" with Inul, one of the tracks in Rebirth Into Reality, combines both hip-hop and dangdut. For the song, Malique and Joe Flizzow recorded in Kuala Lumpur while Inul recorded the track in Jakarta. Originally titled "Goyang Rabak", it was later changed to "How Me Seksi" during the song's pre-recording.

On the album, Malique contributed three solo tracks "My Size 9's", "Run" and "Que Chill" while Joe Flizzow recorded his two solo tracks "Mariposa" and "Average Joe". They were also joined by musicians who involved in the album's production. D'Navigator, best known for his works with Too Phat, provided beatbox for "Most Beautiful Girl", while DJ T-Bone, who had previously provided DJ scratches for most of their songs, also provided scratches for five tracks. For "Kartello Jam", Hamzah, guitarist of Malaysian rock band The Times played guitars while AJ and Rudy from Pop Shuvit plays bass and drums respectively and Izham plays the keyboards. Wei Li of Vespertine plays violin for "I Believe", while Munir Alsagoff plays guitar for "Island Girl". "Jacuzzi Love" with Malaysian R&B group Sloppy Seconds is the only track in the album in which both Malique or Joe Flizzow did not contributed rap.

Actress-singer, Hannah Tan provided backing vocals for "Phat Girls Groove". The album also saws Too Phat performed songs in English while their guest artists sang in their respective native languages. For example, "Perhitung" with Akbar Azmi from Brothers, had him contributed rap in Malay while Malique and Joe contributed rap in English, while for "Rub Pa Gun Kwam Mun", the duo rapped in English while Joey Boy rapped in Thai. Rebirth Into Reality was recorded in Platinum Studios and A System Studios and mastered by CL Toh at Mastering One. For the album, the duo decided to envisioned Rebirth Into Reality as a double album, making Too Phat one of few hip-hop acts in the world to release a double album of original material.

== Artwork ==
The album's cover art was designed by Nini and Bert Ismeth Ulam Raja with photography was taken by Malaysian photographer, Bustamam Mokhtar, using black and white shades. The album cover depicts a Shure 55SH microphone, which also serves as the corporate logo of Kartel Records and the typeface used for the Too Phat's new logo on the album's front and back cover is the Corleone, the same typeface used for the logo of the 1972 American film, The Godfather.

== Release and reception ==
Rebirth Into Reality was released as a double album with 30 songs on 22 September 2005. The album was issued with a long boxset consists of two digipacks, namely "Rebirth" which represents Malique and "Reality" representing Joe Flizzow. An international edition of the album was released in April 2006 with 18 songs. A remastered version of Rebirth Into Reality was released in 2020 by Universal Music Malaysia and PMP Entertainment and reissued with a CD jewel case format.

As of 2007, Rebirth Into Reality was sold more than 25,000 copies, while "Dua Dunia" was downloaded more than 120,000 times.

== Track listing ==
Disc 1: Rebirth
| No. | Title | Writer(s) | Length |
|---|---|---|---|
| 1. | "Snap" | D'Navigator; Malique; Joe Flizzow | 3:25 |
| 2. | "On and On" (featuring Kyla) | Illegal; Malique; Joe Flizzow | 4:18 |
| 3. | "Hey Love" | D'Navigator; Malique; Joe Flizzow | 4:30 |
| 4. | "Love That's True" | Tripdisz; Malique; Joe Flizzow | 3:21 |
| 5. | "Most Beautiful Girl" (featuring V.E.) | Damian Shortysoul; Lah Ahmad; Illegal; Malique; Joe Flizzow | 3:14 |
| 6. | "Phat Girl's Groove" | Eka Shereen; Malique; Joe Flizzow | 3:33 |
| 7. | "Dua Dunia" (featuring Siti Nurhaliza) | Lah Ahmad; D'Navigator; Malique; Joe Flizzow | 4:16 |
| 8. | "True School" | D'Navigator; Malique; Joe Flizzow | 4:25 |
| 9. | "My Size 9's" (Malique's solo) | Lah Ahmad; Malique | 4:57 |
| 10. | "How Me Seksi" (featuring Inul Daratista) | Andi Ayunir; Hary Minggoes; Yonni Dores; D'Navigator; Malique; Joe Flizzow | 4:35 |
| 11. | "Malaysia's Finest" (featuring Arafah of Phlowtron, Koncept83 of KLG Sqwad, Naqib of 3 Flow, Wordsmith of Rapperfectionists and DJ Iman) | Illsteez; Arafah; Koncept83; Naqib; Wordsmith Of Rapperfectionists; Malique; Joe Flizzow | 8:04 |
| 12. | "Deal With Emotions" (featuring Reefa and Supafreak of Phlowtron) | Illegal; Reefa; Supafreak; Malique; Joe Flizzow | 5:47 |
| 13. | "Run" (Malique's solo) | Tripdisz; Malique | 4:47 |
| 14. | "Que Chill" (Malique's solo) | Tripdisz; Malique | 4:44 |
| 15. | "I Believe" | Malique; Joe Flizzow | 3:45 |
| Total length: | | | 73:25 |

Disc 2: Reality
| No. | Title | Writer(s) | Length |
|---|---|---|---|
| 1. | "Showtime" (featuring Phlowtron and KLG Sqwad) | Arafah; Crazy Carleed; Supafreak; Balance; Koncept83; Ming Dynasty; DJ T-Bone; Malique; Joe Flizzow | 4:40 |
| 2. | "KL" | D'Navigator; Malique; Joe Flizzow | 5:01 |
| 3. | "Down to Ride" (featuring JG of Parking Lot Pimp and Alicia Pan) | Terry Lee; JG; Malique; Joe Flizzow | 3:58 |
| 4. | "Forgot My Lyrics" | Malique; Joe Flizzow | 3:56 |
| 5. | "Left to Right" (featuring Koncept83 of KLG Sqwad) | D'Navigator; Koncept83; Malique; Joe Flizzow | 3:48 |
| 6. | "Perhitung" (featuring Akbar of Brothers) | Malique; Joe Flizzow | 4:15 |
| 7. | "Million Miles" (featuring Siti Nurhaliza) | Lah Ahmad; D'Navigator; Malique; Joe Flizzow | 4:06 |
| 8. | "Crazy 88" | D'Navigator; Malique; Joe Flizzow | 4:24 |
| 9. | "Engine #9" (featuring Machi) | Jae Chong; Luke Tsui; Malique; Joe Flizzow | 5:09 |
| 10. | "Island Girl" | Terry Lee; Malique; Joe Flizzow | 4:52 |
| 11. | "Rub Pa Gun Kwam Mun" (featuring Joey Boy) | Joey Boy; Carlo Nanni; Malique; Joe Flizzow | 4:34 |
| 12. | "Jacuzzi Love" (featuring Sloppy Seconds) | D'Navigator; Farez; Malique; Joe Flizzow | 4:15 |
| 13. | "Mariposa" (Joe Flizzow's solo) | D'Navigator; Farez; Joe Flizzow | 4:52 |
| 14. | "Average Joe" (Joe Flizzow's solo; featuring Junior Kim) | Terry Lee; Joe Flizzow | 4:15 |
| 15. | "Kartello Jam" | D'Navigator; Malique; Joe Flizzow | 9:00 |
| Total length: | | | 78:42 |

Notes

- "On and On" contains a sample from "Hey Mr. D.J." performed by Zhané from their 1994 debut studio album, Pronounced Jah-Nay and an interpolation from "One More Chance" performed by The Notorious B.I.G. from his 1994 debut studio album, Ready to Die.
- "Love That's True" contains a sample from "A Love That's True, Pt. 1" performed by Slick Rick from his 1994 studio album, Slick Rick. The song also contains a sample from "Have You Seen Her", performed by The Chi-Lites from their 1971 studio album, (For God's Sake) Give More Power to the People and a sample from "Biz is Goin' Off" performed by Biz Markie from his 1988 studio album, Goin' Off and an interpolation from "Criminal Minded" performed by Boogie Down Productions from their 1987 debut studio album of the same name.
- "My Size 9's" contains audio sample from the 1983 movie, Scarface, directed by Brian De Palma and starring Al Pacino.
- "Que Chill" contains audio sample from "Wind Chimes Birds & Streams (Loon Garden)" by E-mu Systems and a speech by Kanye West at the 47th Grammy Awards.
- "I Believe" contains a sample from "People Get Ready" performed by Aretha Franklin from her 1968 studio album, Lady Soul and a sample from "Nuthin' but a 'G' Thang" performed by Dr. Dre featuring Snoop Dogg from his 1992 debut studio album, The Chronic and also an interpolation of "Juicy" performed by The Notorious B.I.G." featuring Total from his 1994 debut studio album, Ready to Die.
- "Showtime" contains a sample from "I'm a Bachelor" performed by The Temptations from their 1975 studio album, A Song for You.
- "KL" contains a sample from "I Loved and I Lost" performed by The Impressions and Curtis Mayfield from their 1968 studio album, We're a Winner.
- "Left to Right" contains a sample from "Gopher" performed by Yma Sumac from her 1954 studio album, Mambo!.
- "Crazy 88" contains an excerpt from the 2004 movie, Kill Bill: Volume 2, directed by Quentin Tarantino ans starring Uma Thurman.
- "Engine #9" contains a sample from "The Choice Is Yours" performed by Black Sheep from their 1991 debut studio album, A Wolf in Sheep's Clothing.
- "Mariposa" contains a sample from "Love, Love, Love" performed by Donny Hathaway from his 1973 final studio album, Extension of a Man.
- "Kartello Jam" contains a sample from "Dove" performed by Cymande from their 1972 debut studio album of the same name and also contains an excerpts from the 2003 movie, Once Upon a Time in Mexico, directed by Robert Rodriguez and starring Antonio Banderas and an interpolation of "A Blues for Nina" from the Love Jones movie soundtrack.

== Release history ==
| Country | Release date | Format | Label |
|---|---|---|---|
| Malaysia | 22 September 2005 | CD, digital download | Kartel Records, EMI Music Malaysia |
