= Whutthadilly? =

Studio album by Too Phat
- Released: 30 December 1999
- Recorded: 1998 – 1999
- Studios: Haze World Studios; Playtime Studios; Carrybase Studios
- Genres: Hip-hop; rap
- Length: 57:37
- Labels: Positive Tone; EMI Music Malaysia
- Producers: Ahmad Izham Omar; Greg Henderson

Too Phat chronology
Whutthadilly? (1999)	Plan B (2001)

Singles from Whutthadilly?
- 1. "Lil' Fingaz" Released: October 1999; 2. "Too Phat Baby" Released: December 1999; 3. "Jezzebelle" Released: March 2000; 4. "bo-M.O.-h" Released: June 2000

Whutthadilly? is a debut studio album by Malaysian hip-hop duo, Too Phat, released on 30 December 1999 by Positive Tone and EMI Music Malaysia. Four singles were released from the album.

== Production ==
In 1998, Too Phat, who was then a trio with Doctah K is one of its original members, were signed with the independent record label, Strange Culture Records and released two singles, "Give It Up" and "Whutthadilly?". Soon after, they leave the label and later, Doctah K left the group, leaving only Malique and Joe Flizzow to continued as a duo. By early 1999, Too Phat, who was then unsigned with any record label, began working on their debut album, where they also handles pre-production and many technical aspects. Joe Flizzow said on the album's production: "We've spent so much money for the album, and at any one time, we were sleeping in the studio".

In October the same year, they was approached by Ahmad Izham Omar who was then the A&R manager of Positive Tone. Illegal, one of Too Phat's producer, played one of their songs to Izham. They then met Paul Moss who was then the label's A&R director and had a long discussion. The duo became artist under Positive Tone. Whutthadilly? was recorded at the three different recording studios, namely Haze World Studios, Playtime Studios and Carrybase Studios. The album was produced by Izham and Greg Henderson, with CL Toh handles mastering. American musician and composers George Brown and Babyface contributed two songs "Too Phat Baby" and "My, My, My" respectively.

== Release and reception ==
The album was released on 30 December 1999, just two days before the New Year's Day 2000. "Li'l Fingaz", "Too Phat Baby" and "Jezzebelle" were released as the lead singles, with the latter received music videos. The album was well-received, leading Too Phat to won the Best New Local English Artist and nominated for the Best Engineered Album at the 8th Anugerah Industri Muzik in 2001. The music video for "Jezzebelle" also nominated for the Best Music Video at the same award.

== Track listing ==
No.	Title	Writer(s)	Length
1.	"Intro"	DJ T-Bone; Illegal; Malique; Joe Flizzow	1:02
2.	"Too Phat Baby" (feat. Ruffedge)	Spit; G. Brown; Illegal; Malique; Joe Flizzow	4:12
3.	"Bla, Bla" (feat. Reefa)	G-Soul; Malique; Joe Flizzow; Reefa	4:39
4.	"Lil' Fingaz" (feat. Damian of Soulstreet)	G-Soul; Malique; Joe Flizzow	4:46
5.	"Jampi"	Illegal; Lady D	1:06
6.	"bo-M.O.-h" (feat. Lady D & Sri Jimbit Dikir United)	Lady D; Illegal; Malique; Joe Flizzow	4:51
7.	"I Like You Now"	G-Soul; Malique; Leaflizard	4:33
8.	"Goin' Grazy"	G-Soul; Malique; Leaflizard	4:53
9.	"Jezze Interlude"	Ahmad Izham Omar; Illegal	0:27
10.	"Jezzebelle" (feat. Innuendo)	Lady D; Ahmad Izham Omar; Illegal; Malique; Joe Flizzow	4:29
11.	"Skoo The Nonsense" (feat. Naughtius Maximus, First Borne Troopz & Da Joint)	G-Soul; Jungle Jerry; Spit; Mista Rem; G; Fiquetional; Mizz Nina; Malique; Joe Flizzow	5:40
12.	"My, My, My" (feat. Haze & Sam of Innuendo)	Babyface; D'Simmons; Haze; G-Soul	4:51
13.	"Whutthadilly?" (Too Ill Mix)	Illegal; Malique	4:17
14.	"Give It Up" (feat. Liyana & Damian of Soulstreet)	Mr. Khoo; Wan Ermie; Illegal; Malique; Joe Flizzow	4:53
15.	"Whutthadilly?" (Original demo-mix bonus track)	Mr. Khoo; Wan Ermie; G-Soul; Malique	4:00
Total length:			57:37

Notes

- "Intro" contains a sample from "Seiring Sejalan" composed by Ahmad Nawab and performed by Sharifah Aini and Broery Marantika from the 1976 film, Hapuslah Airmatamu produced by Sabah Film Productions.
- "Too Phat Baby" contains an interpolation from "Too Hot" composed by George Brown and performed by Kool & The Gang from the album Ladies' Night.
- "bo-M.O.-h" contains a sample from the 1997 film, Layar Lara, directed by Shuhaimi Baba.
- "Goin' Crazy" contains a sample from the British TV series Black Adder, produced by the BBC.
- "Jezzebelle" based on the original version performed by Innuendo.
- "Skoo the Nonsense" contains an interpolation from the Alfred Hitchcock Presents theme song by Stanley Wilson.

== Credits and personnel ==
The credits are adapted from the album's booklet liner notes.

Performers and musicians

- Too Phat - vocals (all tracks)
- Ruffedge - vocals (track 2)
- Reefa - vocals (track 3)
- Damian of Soulstreet - vocals (track 4), additional vocals (track 14)
- Lady D - traditional vocals (track 5), vocals (track 6)
- Sri Jimbit Dikir United - vocals (track 6)
- Fareez of Soulstreet - additional vocals (track 7)
- Phat Tim - additional vocals (track 7)
- K-Laid - additional vocals (track 8)
- Innuendo - vocals (track 10)
- Naughtius Maximus - vocals (track 11)
- First Borne Troopz - vocals (track 11)
- Da Joint - vocals (track 11)
- DJ T-Bone - DJ scratches (track 11)
- Haze - vocals (track 12)
- Sam of Innuendo - vocals (track 12)
- Liyana Lil' Boogie - vocals (track 14)
- DJ Ken - DJ scratches (track 15)

Technical and production

- Too Phat - composer (all tracks), lyrics (all tracks), arranger (track 15), producer (tracks 1 and 14)
  - Malique - composer (track 8), co-producer (tracks 3, 7 and 8), lyrics (tracks 7, 13 and 15)
  - Joe Flizzow - lyrics (track 3), co-producer (track 8)
- Reefa - lyrics (track 3)
- Leafizard - lyrics (track 7), composer (track 8)
- Fiquetional - lyrics (track 11)
- Mizz Nina - lyrics (track 11)
- G - lyrics (track 11)
- M'$ta Rem - lyrics (track 11)
- Spit - lyrics (track 11)
- DJ T-Bone - arranger (track 1)
- Illegal - composer (tracks 2, 6 and 13), producer (tracks 2, 10, 13 and 14), arranger (tracks 1, 2, 6, 9, 10 and 13), engineer (tracks 1, 5, 6, 9, 10, 13 and 14), mixer (tracks 1, 2, 5, 6, 9, 10, 13 and 14)
- Spit - lyrics (track 11), engineer (tracks 2 and 4)
- G-Soul - composer (tracks 3, 4, 7, 8, 11 and 13), producer (tracks 3, 4, 6–8 and 11), arranger (tracks 3, 4, 6–8 and 11), additional arranger (track 6), engineer (tracks 3, 4, 7, 8, 11 and 12), mixer (tracks 3, 4, 7, 8, 11 and 12)
- G. Brown - composer (track 2)
- Ahmad Izham Omar - composer (tracks 9 and 10), performer (track 9), producer (tracks 9 and 10), arranger (tracks 9 and 10)
- Lady D - composer (tracks 5 and 10), lyrics (tracks 6 and 10), producer (track 6)
- Kenneth "Babyface" Edmonds - composer (track 12)
- Daryl Simmons - composer (track 12)
- Haze - composer, arranger, producer (track 12)
- Mr. Khoo - engineer (tracks 14 and 15)
- Wan Ermie - engineer (track 14), arranger (track 15), producer (track 15)

Credits

- Kevin Rozario - art direction
- Too Phat - creative director
- The Big Orange - creative director
- Fadhil - design
- Zulfikar - design
- Chantran of Priya Studio - photography
- CL Toh - mastering
- Playtime Studios - recording and mixing studios
- Carrybase Studios - recording and mixing studios
- Haze World Studios - recording studios
- Mastering One - mastering studios

== Awards ==
Award	Year	Recipient(s) and nominee(s)	Category	Result	Ref(s)
Anugerah Industri Muzik	2001	Whutthadilly?	Best Engineered Album	Nominated	
Anugerah Industri Muzik	2001	"Jezzebelle"	Best Music Video	Nominated	

== Release history ==
Country	Release date	Format	Label
Malaysia	30 December 1999	CD, digital download	Positive Tone, EMI Music Malaysia
