= Plan B (Too Phat album) =

Studio album by Too Phat
- Released: 30 March 2001
- Recorded: 2000 – 2001
- Studio: Playtime Studios
- Genres: Hip-hop; rap
- Length: 63:56
- Labels: Positive Tone; EMI Music Malaysia
- Producers: Ahmad Izham Omar; Greg Henderson

Too Phat chronology
Whutthadilly? (1999)	Plan B (2001)	360° (2003)

Alternative cover
- Platinum Edition cover

Singles from Plan B
- 1. "Anak Ayam (Freak to the Beat)" Released: 1 March 2001; 2. "You" Released: July 2001; 3. "Just a Friend" Released: October 2001

Plan B is a second studio album by Malaysian hip-hop duo, Too Phat, released on 30 March 2001 by Positive Tone and EMI Music Malaysia. The album was sold 45,000 copies and certified platinum. A platinum edition of the album was released with the addition of two new songs.

== Production ==
Following the commercial success of their debut album, Whutthadilly?, Too Phat return to studio in late 2000 and began working on their second album, entitled Plan B. The album was recorded primarily at Playtime Studios was produced by Ahmad Izham Omar and Greg Henderson. On the album, Malique and Joe Flizzow co-wrote all tracks. American rapper, Biz Markie received writer credits for the new arrangement of his original song, "Just a Friend". The duo approached Camelia and Sharifah Aini to be their duet partners for the song "What You Want" and "You" respectively. They were also joined by musicians including Tham and Rabbit on guitars, Izham on piano, DJ T-Bone on turntables.

== Release and reception ==
Plan B was released on 30 March 2001. "Anak Ayam (Freak to the Beat)" was released as the album's first single. Two music videos were produced for "Anak Ayam" and "Just a Friend". The music video for "Just a Friend" was filmed in Kuala Lumpur and produced in collaboration with Hotlink and features a cameo appearances from M. Nasir, Fauziah Latiff and Ferhad as well as Watson Nyambek. The album was well-received, sold over 45,000 copies and being certified double platinum. The album also earned Too Phat a Gold Disc. A Platinum Edition of the album was released in October 2001 with the addition of two new songs, namely "Clap to This" and "Last Song". It also came up with the bonus VCD that contains the duo's home video footage and music videos for "Jezzebelle" and "Just a Friend".

The album also leading Too Phat to won the Best Local English Album and the Best Engineered Album as well as to be nominated for the Best Vocal Performance in an Album (Group) at the 9th Anugerah Industri Muzik in 2002. Writing for the New Straits Times, Zainal Alam Kadir called the album "more amusing, more refreshing, more danceable with even more groove", while Abie Abdullah from Harian Metro described the album is "more Malaysia". Terrina Hussein from The Malay Mail also praised the album and considered it as "purely potent".

== Track listing ==
No.	Title	Writer(s)	Length
1.	"Boogie Down?"	Damian Soulstreet; Malique; Joe Flizzow	3:44
2.	"Anak Ayam (Freak to the Beat)"	Damian Soulstreet; Malique; Joe Flizzow	4:26
3.	"Emcee Interlude"		1:03
4.	"Just a Friend" (feat. V.E.)	Biz Markie; Malique; Joe Flizzow; Leaflizard	5:18
5.	"Wanna Battle?" (feat. Reefa, Mizz Nina of Teh Tarik Crew, Noreen of Muchachaz and M.O.B.)	Damian Soulstreet; Malique; Joe Flizzow; Reefa; Mizz Nina; Noreen; Saint; Sam	4:24
6.	"Deejay Interlude"		1:20
7.	"Camelia Skit"		0:31
8.	"What You Want?" (feat. Camelia)	Illegal; Lady D; Malique; Joe Flizzow	4:34
9.	"It's On You" (feat. Teh Tarik Crew)	Soul G; Malique; Joe Flizzow; Altimet; Fiquetional	4:53
10.	"Who Wants To Be An Illionaire? Skit"		2:48
11.	"Illion" (feat. Emberz of Soul)	Illegal; Lady D; Malique; Joe Flizzow	4:20
12.	"Pink Lady"	G-Soul; Illegal; Eka Shereen; Malique; Joe Flizzow	5:53
13.	"B-Boy Interlude"		1:00
14.	"Get Stoopid"	Damian Soulstreet; Malique; Joe Flizzow	4:08
15.	"Jezzebelle" (Remix)		4:45
16.	"Graffiti Interlude"		0:55
17.	"You" (feat. Sharifah Aini)	Haze; Malique; Joe Flizzow	4:37
Total length:			63:56

Platinum Edition bonus tracks
No.	Title	Writer(s)	Length
18.	"Clap to This" (feat. Lil' Marissa)	Damian Soulstreet; Malique; Joe Flizzow	4:10
19.	"Last Song"	Malique; Joe Flizzow	5:26
20.	"Emcee, B-Boy, DJ and Graffiti Interlude"		1:00

Platinum Edition bonus VCD
No.	Title	Length
1.	"Phat Home Video"	31:59
2.	"Anak Ayam (Freak to the Beat)"	5:06
3.	"Jezzebelle"	5:13

Notes

- "Boogie Down" contains a sample from "Kuda Ku Lari" performed by Sharifah Aini from the album Inilah Laguku.
- "Anak Ayam (Freak to the Beat)" contains a sample from "Kuda Ku Lari" performed by Sharifah Aini from the album Inilah Laguku and the chorus contains an interpolation of a freestyle recorded by Dilated Peoples from The Wake Up Show by Sway & King Tech.
- "Just a Friend" based on the original song performed by Biz Markie.
- "Get Stoopid" contains a sample from the movie Enter the Dragon directed by Robert Clouse starring Bruce Lee.
- "Clap to This" contains a sample from "Keepin' the Faith" performed by De La Soul and also from "The Classical Collection" by Niccolò Paganini.

== Release history ==
Country	Release date	Format	Label
Malaysia	30 March 2001	CD, digital download	Positive Tone, EMI Music Malaysia
