= SonaOne =

French-Malaysian singer, songwriter, and rapper (born 1988)

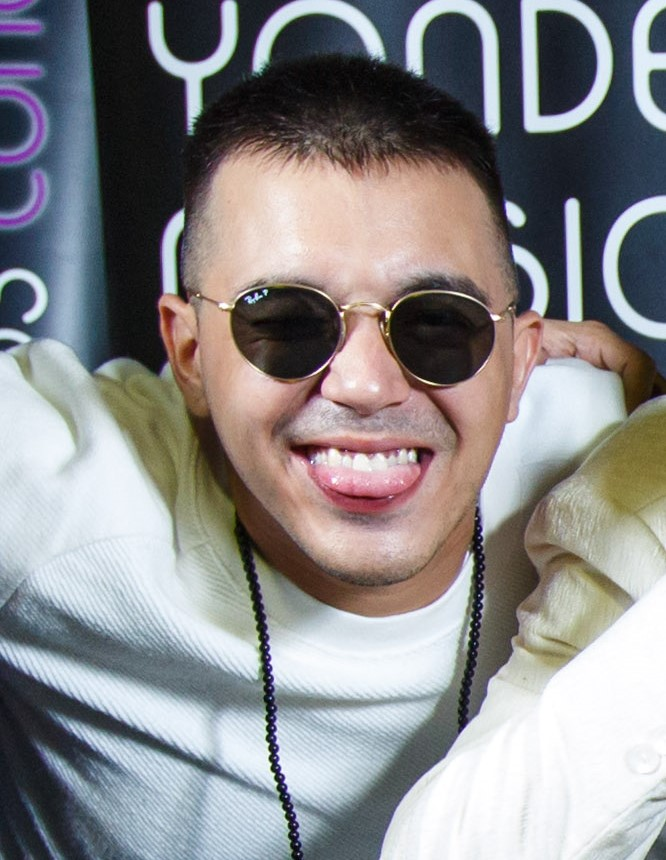
- SonaOne in 2016

Background information
- Born: Mikael Adam bin Muhammad Rafee Michel Lozac’h; 30 November 1988 (age 37); Kuantan, Pahang, Malaysia
- Genres: Hip hop; R&B; Pop Music; Trap Music; French Rap
- Occupations: Rapper; Singer; Record Producer; Composer; Songwriter; Audio Engineer; Music Video Director; Graffiti Artist
- Instruments: Vocals; Keyboards; Drum; Sampler
- Years active: 2005–present
- Labels: Def Jam South East Asia; Def Jam Malaysia; Universal Music Malaysia; Kartel Records (defunct)

Mikael Adam bin Muhammad Rafee Michel Lozac’h or Mikael Adam Lozac’h, (born 30 November 1988) better known as SonaOne & Kid Kenobi is a Malaysian rapper, singer, songwriter, record producer and graffiti artist. He gained recognition through the songs "I Don't Care" with Karmal, "No More" and with fellow rapper Joe Flizzow & Altimet "Havoc" and "Apa Khabar". In 2014, he and Joe Flizzow won the 29th Anugerah Juara Lagu for their hit charting song Apa Khabar. His song "No More" was awarded the best song in the 21st Anugerah Industri Muzik. It made him one of few composers who have won two major awards in the same year, with the other being Adnan Abu Hassan.

== Early life ==
SonaOne was born in Kangar, Perlis on November 30, 1988. His mother, Noorzulaily, a Malaysian dance designer was married to a Frenchman, Michel Lozach. He has lived abroad since he was two weeks old as his parents worked in a resort, Club Med. Due to the background of his parents, they settled in many places including Spain, France and Japan. At the age of 6, his uncle gave him a gift of a Sony Soundpad which was the first musical instrument he played while attending music classes. While staying in Paris, SonaOne took part in graffiti-painting activities. Returning to Malaysia at age 10, SonaOne studied at a French school and continued his interest in graffiti-painting in Kuala Lumpur. At the age of 12, he started working with production software such as Music 2000 and Project 5, and started Flash and sound-programming with his close friends including the brother of Joe Flizzow. In 2005, the 17-year-old SonaOne attracted Joe Flizzow's interest in making the teenager a protegee. At the time, SonaOne was better known as a graffiti artist rather than a musician. Since then, he started publishing music independently and received attention from artists such as Karmal. He joined a Malaysian musical group called "G.O.D Music – Gentlemen On Dinosaurs" under Kartel Records in 2010, which established him as a musician.

== Career ==
After joining Kartel, he began using the SonaOne alias as a commercial name. At that time, he pursued productions of mixtape which was well received by fans through social media platforms. His first mixtape, "Illegal Downloads Vol. 1" was published on April 20, 2010, and was followed by "Illegal Downloads Vol. 2" on April 20, 2011. He then launched another mixtape "Tuna Spaghetti" on November 30, 2010, and gained further recognition with songs like "No Snooze", "Flyer Than Your G6" and "Like a Dream". Through "Tuna Spaghetti", he managed to gather more followers. He was nominated for the Shout Awards! in 2010 for the Hip-hop/Urban category.

His first appearance as an artist was through the "Hip Hop In Asia" program where he joined some of the region's notable rappers such as Sheikh Haikel of Singapore, Micbandits of Brunei, Dandee of Thailand and Thaikoon of USA. SonaOne was also invited to host a documentary program once.

His debut studio album "Growing Up Sucks!" was released on December 9, 2013, which included the English-language song "No More" as the lead single. "Hak Eleh" was released as the second single.

In April 2016, he was invited by singer, Siti Nurhaliza to perform at her concert – Dato 'Siti Nurhaliza & Friends, at National Stadium, Bukit Jalil alongside Joe Flizzow, Faizal Tahir, Hafiz Suip, Cakra Khan, Afgan Syahreza and Anggun.

== Discography ==
=== Studio albums ===
- Growing Up Sucks! (2016)
- DETAIL Joint Album With ALYPH (2019)
- THE LOCCDOWN (2020)

=== Mixtapes ===
- Illegal Downloads Vol. 1 (2010)
- Tuna Spaghetti (2010)
- Illegal Downloads Vol. 2 (2011)

=== Featuring Tracks ===
- Tlinh Ft. Sonaone – POLITE (2025)
- Joe Flizzow Ft. Sonaone – Satu Malam Di Temasek (2022)
- Douglas Lim & Sonaone – ADUH (2022)
- ForceParkBois Ft. Dinho , Rudeen, Jaystation, Vertgin, Sxph, Ichu, F.Rider, Offgrid, Guccimith, Addy Khayal & Sonaone – LOTUS ALL STAR REMIX (2021)
- Danye & A-kid Ft. Pele.L , Izhar, Airliftz, Sonaone, B-Heart & Amzar Sabri – Play On Playa REMIX (2021)
- Ørumari & Tactmatic Ft. Sonaone – Light Brown (2021)
- YHB Sleepsalot Ft. Sonaone – Jatuh Boi (2021)
- A. Nayaka Ft. Sonaone, Fateeha & Tiffany Lhei – Orang Lain (Def Jam Philippines Remix) – (2021)
- A. Nayaka Ft. Sonaone,YHB Sleepsalot,Joe Flizzow, Yonnyboii,Airliftz,SYA,SENNA & Zynakal – Orang Lain (Def Jam Malaysia Remix) (2021)
- A. Nayaka Ft. Sonaone & YHB Sleepsalot – Orang Lain (2021)
- ALYPH & Sonaone – Made in MY (#sicreview episode 1) | Netflix Malaysia (2020)
- ALYPH & Sonaone – Rise (Music Inspired by "Star Wars: The Rise of Skywalker" (2019)
- SENNA Ft. Sonaone – HOW I FEEL (2019)
- A. Nayaka Ft. Sonaone – Tropical (2018)
- Krayziesoundz Ft. Ninjaboi, SENNA & Sonaone – Ballin’ On A Budget (2018)
- Tabitha Nauser Ft. Sonaone – Body Language (2017)
- Sayla Ft. ALYPH,Karmal,Akeem Jahat,QBE & Sonaone – Guadabuda (2017)
- Zizan Razak Ft. Sonaone – Chentaku (2017)
- Yuna (singer) Ft. Sonaone – Pulang (2016)
- Afgansyah Reza Ft. Sonaone – X (2016)
- Fat Joe Ft. Jay Park, AK-69, DaboyWay,Sonaone,Joe Flizzow – All The Way Up (Asian Remix) (2016)
- Akeem Jahat Ft. Sonaone – Ribena (2014)
- Joe Flizzow Ft. Sonaone – Apa Khabar – (2013)
- Joe Flizzow, Altimet & Sonaone – Who Do It Better (2010)

=== Production Discography (PROD BY. KID KENOBI) ===
- Snoop Dogg & Joe Flizzow – Pioneers (Prod. By SonaOne) (2022)
- A. Nayaka – Marilah Berdansa (Prod. by Kid Kenobi) (2023)
- Joe Flizzow – SUNYI (Prod. By Kid Kenobi & MAGIC POTIONS) (2023)
- Yonnyboii Ft. ALYPH – Sengkek (Prod. By Kid Kenobi) (2023)
- Ismail Izzani – Apakonak (Prod. By Kid Kenobi & DJ Biggie) – (2022)
- Douglas Lim & Sonaone – ADUH (Prod. By Kid Kenobi) (2022)
- Joe Flizzow Ft. Sonaone – Satu Malam Di Temasek (Prod. By Kid Kenobi) (2022)
- Caprice Ft. Sonaone,Zynakal,TUJULOCA – AYAH (Prod. By Kid Kenobi & DaddyCap) (2022)
- A. Nayaka Ft. Sonaone, Fateeha & Tiffany Lhei – Orang Lain (Def Jam Philippines Remix) (Prod. By Kid Kenobi) (2021)
- A. Nayaka Ft. Sonaone,YHB Sleepsalot,Joe Flizzow, Yonnyboii,Airliftz,SYA,SENNA & Zynakal – Orang Lain (Def Jam Malaysia Remix) (Prod. By Kid Kenobi) (2021)
- A. Nayaka Ft. Sonaone & YHB Sleepsalot – Orang Lain (Prod. By Kid Kenobi) (2021)
- Nakalness – BADBOY (Prod. By Kid Kenobi) (2021)
- SYA Ft. Yung Raja – PrettyGirlBop (Prod. By Kid Kenobi) (2020)
- Talitha. Ft. Sonaone – Openup (Prod. By Kid Kenobi) (2020)
- A. Nayaka – Waktu Tiba (Prod. By Kid Kenobi) (2020)
- Abubakarxli Ft. Fariz Jabba – KRU (Prod. By Kid Kenobi) (2020)
- Abubakarxli – NiNiNi (Prod. By Kid Kenobi) (2020)
- Sonaone & ALYPH – DETAIL (Co Produced Album With Magic Potions) (2019)
- Afgansyah Reza Ft. Sonaone – X (Prod. By Sonaone) (2016)
- Joe Flizzow Ft. Sonaone – Apa Khabar (Prod. By Sonaone) – (2013)
- Joe Flizzow – HAVOC (Album Produced By Sonaone) – (2013)

=== ETC ===
- 16 Baris Season 3 Bonus Episode – Sonaone,Shigga Shay,SXPH,MC SYZE,BIG CALO, Joe Flizzow
- 16 Baris Season 1 Episode 8 – Sonaone,Radio3000 & Lil J
- Audio Engineer (MIXING):

16 Baris Season 1 EPISODE 1–15 https://youtube.com/playlist?list=PLzULFuKsrCBRIofYJslIhyPeo36Wkb94g&si=3bwG0-qM7IAumzEE

- Audio Engineer (MIXING):

16 Baris Season 2 EPISODE 1–15 https://youtube.com/playlist?list=PLzULFuKsrCBQY1UrYeFKHwoYZhdUsGpAZ&si=Li7c4lsGfyyq32ia

- Audio Engineer (MIXING):

16 Baris Season 3 EPISODE 1–15 https://youtube.com/playlist?list=PLzULFuKsrCBScEn-Q7XsrNzGtw-oy8-hP&si=7O5pntuqxAIXeMHh

== Awards and nominations ==
Year	Award	Category	Nomination	Result	Reference
2010	Shout! Awards	Flava Award	SonaOne	Nominated	
2014	Anugerah Industri Muzik	Best Song	"No More" (Mikael Lozach)	Won	
2014	Anugerah Industri Muzik	Best English-Malaysian Song	"No More" (Mikael Lozach)	Won	
2014	Anugerah Industri Muzik	Best Hip Hop Song	"Apa Khabar" (Mikael Lozach, Johan Ishak)	Won	
2014	Anugerah Industri Muzik	Best Song	"Apa Khabar" (Mikael Lozach, Johan Ishak)	Nominated	
2014	Anugerah Industri Muzik	Best Hip Hop Song	"Havoc" (Mikael Lozach, Johan Ishak, Altimet)	Nominated	
2014	Anugerah Industri Muzik	Best Newcomer	SonaOne	Nominated	
2015	Anugerah Juara Lagu	Juara Keseluruhan	"Apa Khabar" (Mikael Lozach, Johan Ishak)	Won	
2015	Anugerah Planet Muzik	Best Newcomer (Male)	"Hakeleh"	Nominated	
2015	Anugerah Planet Muzik	Most Popular Song	"Hakeleh"	Nominated	
2015	Anugerah Planet Muzik	Best Song (Malaysia)	"Hakeleh"	Nominated	

== Controversy ==
SonaOne has been wounded in the face and head after being attacked by a man at shopping mall Fahrenheit 88 at Jalan Bukit Bintang. He was in the car with two friends before the suspect pulled him out of the car and beat him. He was continued to be beaten until he fell.
