= Yung Raja =

Singaporean-Tamil rapper (born 1995)

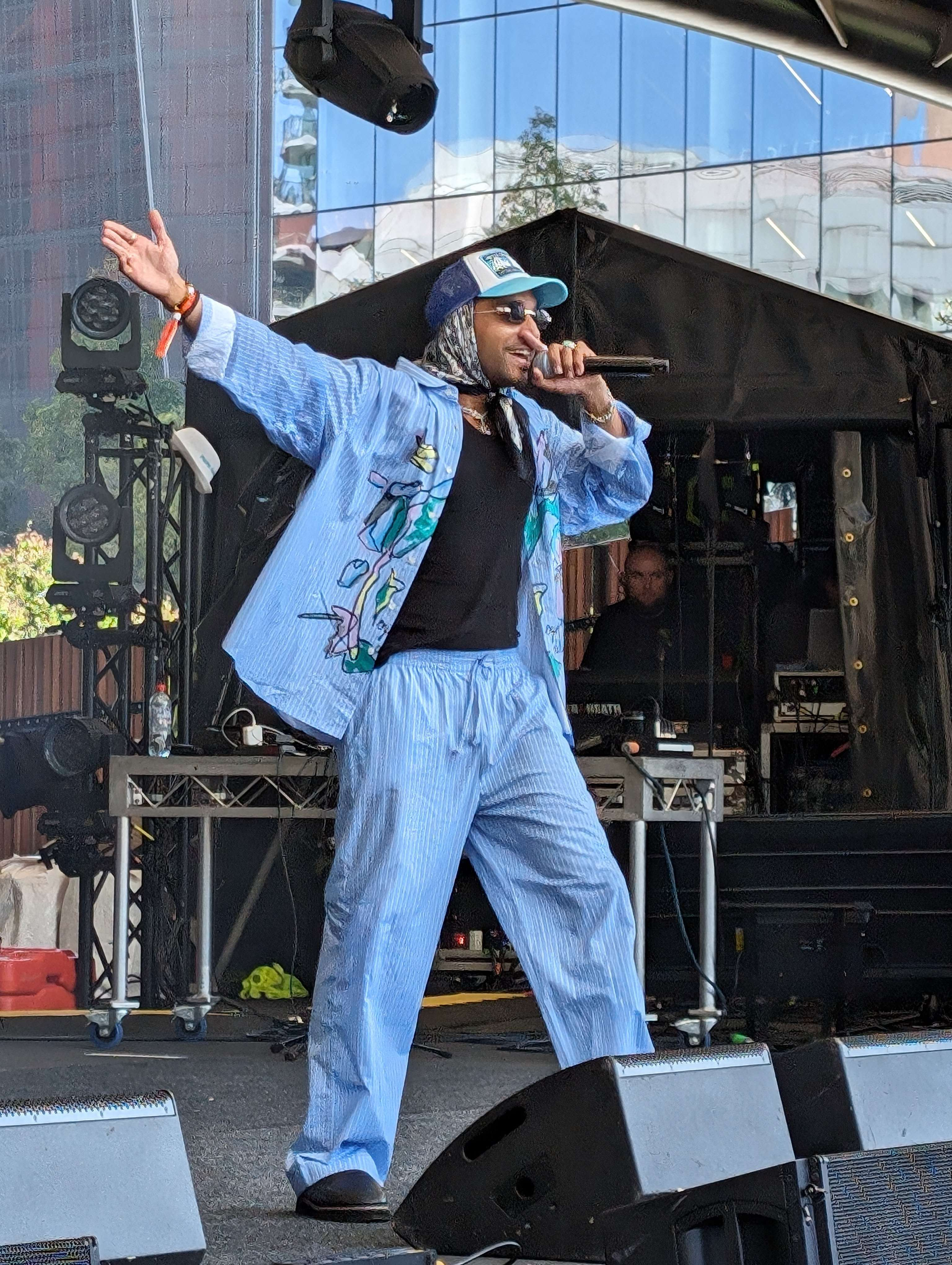
- Yung Raja at SXSW Sydney, October 2024.
- Born: Rajid Ahamed Yousuf Arafat; 14 December 1995 (age 30); Singapore
- Education: Ngee Ann Polytechnic
- Occupations: Rapper; songwriter
- Years active: 2018–present
- Musical career
- Origin: Singapore
- Genre: Hip hop
- Instrument: Vocals
- Labels: Def Jam SEA; Alamo Records

Rajid Ahamed Yousuf Arafat (born 14 December 1995), known by his stage name Yung Raja, is a Singaporean-Tamil rapper and songwriter. He is known for his use of Tanglish, a mix of Tamil and English, in his raps.

== Early life ==
Rajid Ahamed was born in 1995, in Singapore, to Tamil-Muslim parents from Thanjavur Tamil Nadu. Ahamed has three elder sisters, which led to him being given the nickname "chinna thambi" (Tamil meaning: younger brother), and subsequently inspiring the first half of his stage name. The second half of his stage name, Raja, pays tribute to the Indian composer, Ilaiyaraaja.

Rajid Ahamed attended Ngee Ann Polytechnic and graduated with a diploma in mass communications.

== Career ==
Before becoming a singer-songwriter, Ahamed was a child actor acting in local dramas and having cameos in films including Ah Boys to Men 3: Frogmen and Joker Game.

Released in early 2018, Yung Raja's debut single was a remix of "Gucci Gang" by Lil Pump, titled "Poori Gang". Yung Raja came to prominence after being featured in an episode of the Malaysia hip hop web-series, 16 Baris, in 2018. The same year, he rose to prominence with the single "Mustafa", which was followed by "Mad Blessings". A sequel to "Mad Blessings", titled "The Dance Song", was released in October 2020.

In 2019, Ahamed hosted the Asian reboot of YO! MTV Raps alongside Kim Lee. Yung Raja was one of six inaugural signees of Def Jam Southeast Asia (alongside Joe Flizzow, Daboyway, Fariz Jabba and A.Nayaka) in September 2019. After becoming the first Asian artist signed to Alamo Records, he released the single "Mami" in March 2021. Yung Raja gained international attention after "Mami" was featured in The Tonight Show segment when Jimmy Fallon roasted the song's repetitive hook. In November 2023, he was chosen as a supporting act for American rapper 50 Cent's show in Mumbai, as part of The Final Lap Tour, alongside rappers Divine, Prabh Deep and SVDP.

== Influences ==
Yung Raja was influenced by musicians including A.R. Rahman, FlightSch, Alyph, Sid Sriram, and Drake.

== Discography ==
=== Extended plays ===
- One 65 (2021)
- Mike (2021)

=== Singles ===
==== As lead artist ====
List of singles as lead artist, showing year released and album name
Title	Year	Album
"Poori Gang"	2018	Non-album singles
"Mustafa"	2018	Non-album singles
"Mad Blessings"	2019	Non-album singles
"Amazing" (with ALYPH and Trifect)	2020	Non-album singles
"The Dance Song"	2020	Non-album singles
"Muneru Valiba"	2020	One 65
"Mami"	2021	Non-album singles
"Spice Boy"	2021	Non-album singles
"Mike"	2021	Mike
"And Then" (with Fariz Jabba)	2021	Non-album single

==== As featured artist ====
List of singles as lead artist, showing year released and album name
Title	Year	Album
"PrettyGirlBop" (SYA featuring Yuna Raja)	2020	Non-album single
"No Shade" (Kayan featuring Yuna Raja)	2022	Non-album single
"Killin' 'Em" (Sushin Shyam featuring Yung Raja)	2026	Non-album single

==== Guest appearances ====
List of non-single guest appearances, with other performing artists, showing year released and album name
Title	Year	Other artist(s)	Album
"Qualified"	2021	Snoop Dogg, Larry June, October London	Snoop Dogg Presents Algorithm (Global Edition)
