= 360° (Too Phat album) =

Studio album by Too Phat
- Released: 20 February 2003
- Recorded: 2002 – 2003
- Studios: Playtime Productions; Haze World Studio; NRG Recording; Studio Lokaln; The Bus Stop Studio; Solid Studios
- Genres: Hip-hop; rap
- Length: 72:51
- Labels: Positive Tone; EMI Music Malaysia
- Producers: Ahmad Izham Omar; Greg Henderson

Too Phat chronology
Plan B (2001)	360° (2003)	Too Phat Classics (2004)

Alternative cover
- Platinum Edition cover

Singles from 360°
- 1. "Just a Lil' Bit" Released: 27 January 2003; 2. "Ala Canggung" Released: 2003; 3. "Alhamdulillah" Released: 2003

360° is a third studio album by the Malaysian hip-hop duo, Too Phat, released on 20 February 2003 by Positive Tone and EMI Music Malaysia. It is their last album with Positive Tone as the label they signed went bankrupt a year later. It was sold 100,000 copies and certified platinum. A platinum edition of the album was released with the addition of three new songs, while a reissue edition was released in 2019 with a completely different album cover design.

== Background and recording ==
More than a year after the success of their second album, Plan B, in September 2002, Too Phat announced that they will be released their third album, slated for the early 2003 release, with the album was being titled 360°.

For the album, they decided on a collaboration with international hip-hop acts, eventually working with Warren G and Freestyle from Arsonists of the United States, Vandal from SMC of Canada, Weapon X from X & Hell of Australia and Promoe from Loop Troop of Sweden. The song "Just a Lil' Bit" was recorded in two versions, namely the 'Original Censored' and the 'Remix Censored'. The duo recorded the song in Malaysia while Warren G recorded it in the United States. The duo also collaborated with few Malaysian artists in the album, including Yasin Sulaiman from nasyid group, Brothers. They selected Yasin as their duet partner for the song, "Alhamdulillah", in which he sang the chorus and bridge in Arabic while Malique and Joe Flizzow contributed rap in English.

== Release and reception ==
360° was released on 20 February 2003 and was well-received, selling more than 11,000 copies in just two days. Its sales figures then increased to 25,000 copies as of October. By April 2004, the album's sales increased to 50,000 copies.

The first single released from the album was "Just a Lil' Bit (The Remix Censored)" with Warren G on 27 January 2003, followed by two further singles "Ala Canggung (Do You Wanna Have A Party?)" and "Alhamdulillah". The album's second single, "Ala Canggung" serves as the spinoff of "Anak Ayam (Freak to the Beat)" from their previous album, Plan B.

A Platinum Edition of the album was released in April 2004 with the addition of three new songs, namely a Malay version of "Alhamdulillah" with Yasin Sulaiman, Daly of Ahli Fiqir and Indonesian actress, Dian Sastrowardoyo and "Ala Canggung" with Yusni Hamid as well as a remix version of "Nasty Girl". It also contains a single edit version of "Alhamdulillah" (original English version) and "Tell Shorty", where both songs were edited from original 5 and 7 minutes to 4 minutes respectively.

== Track listing ==
No.	Title	Writer(s)	Length
1.	"Story That Must Be Told" (Intro)	Malique; Joe Flizzow; DJ T-Bone	1:15
2.	"Alhamdulillah" (feat. Yasin Sulaiman)	Navin d'Navigator; Malique; Joe Flizzow; Yasin Sulaiman	5:42
3.	"Just a Lil' Bit (Original Censored)" (feat. Warren G)	Qumran; Malique; Joe Flizzow; Warren G	5:00
4.	"Tell Shorty" (feat. V.E. & Ruffedge)	Malique; Joe Flizzow	7:35
5.	"Nasty Girl" (Joe Flizzow solo)	Damian Shortysoul; Joe Flizzow	4:33
6.	"Walk With Me" (feat. Noreen of Muchachaz, Quotazn & Lah of V.E.)	Illegal; Malique; Joe Flizzow; Quotazn	4:57
7.	"Ala Canggung (Do You Wanna Have A Party?)" (feat. Lil' Marissa)	Damian Shortysoul; Malique; Joe Flizzow	3:32
8.	"Worda Wordee Wordoo"	Illegal; Malique; Joe Flizzow	4:55
9.	"Global MC Infinite" (Skit)	See K-Flow of SMC	0:26
10.	"6 MC's" (feat. Promoe of Loop Troop, Vandal of SMC, Freestyle of Arsonists & Weapon X of X & Hell)	Illsteez; Malique; Joe Flizzow; Promoe; Vandal; Freestyle; Weapon X	7:07
11.	"I Wanna Break" (Shoutout Interlude)	Malique; Joe Flizzow; DJ T-Bone	3:42
12.	"I Wanna Break" (Instrumental)	Jerry Lordan	3:35
13.	"Where My Love At?" (Malique solo)	Damian Shortysoul; Malique	4:13
14.	"Ali Baba & The Mic Thieves" (feat. Phlowtron)	Tripdisz; Malique; Joe Flizzow; Supafreak; Crazy Carleed; Atom Da' Bomb	4:41
15.	"If I Die Tonight" (feat. Liyana)	Azan; Liyana; Malique; Joe Flizzow; Leaflizard; Farah Farena	5:29
16.	"Just a Lil' Bit (The Remix Censored)" (feat. Warren G)	Qumran; Malique; Joe Flizzow; Warren G	4:59
17.	"Me & You" (Outro)	Malique; Joe Flizzow; DJ T-Bone	0:57
Total length:			72:51

Platinum Edition bonus tracks
No.	Title	Length
18.	"Alhamdulillah" (feat. Dian Sastrowardoyo, Yasin Sulaiman & Daly of Ahli Fiqir)	5:54
19.	"Ala Canggung" (feat. Yusni Hamid)	4:18
20.	"Nasty Girl" (T-Bone & Goldfish Remix)	4:05

Notes

- "Story That Must Be Told (Intro)" contains a sample from The Real Keroncong.
- "Nasty Girl" contains a sample from "Godaanku" by Khatijah Ibrahim from her 1980 studio album Potret Kasih.
- "Ala Canggung (Do You Wanna Have a Party?)" and "Ali Baba & The Mic Thieves" contains audio sample from the 1961 movie Ali Baba Bujang Lapok directed by P. Ramlee.
- "I Wanna Break (Shootout Interlude)" contains a sample from "Break Dance – Electric Boogie" performed by West Street Mob from their 1983 studio album of the same name and an interpolation of "Apache" performed by The Shadows.
- "If I Die Tonight" contains a sample from "If I Die 2Nite" performed by Tupac Shakur from his 1995 studio album Me Against the World.
- "Me & You (Outro)" contains a sample from "Elevators (Me & You)" performed by Outkast from the album ATLiens and a beats taken from "C.R.E.A.M." performed by the Wu-Tang Clan from their 1993 debut album Enter the Wu-Tang (36 Chambers).

== Certifications and sales ==
Region	Certification	Certified units/sales
Malaysia (RIM)	Platinum	50,000

== Release history ==
Country	Release date	Format	Label
Malaysia	20 February 2003	CD, digital download	Positive Tone, EMI Music Malaysia
