= Just a Lil' Bit (song) =

Single by Too Phat featuring Warren G

from the album 360°
- Released: 27 January 2003
- Studio: Haze World Studios (Kuala Lumpur); NRG Recordings (Los Angeles)
- Genre: Hip-hop
- Length: 5:00
- Label: Positive Tone; EMI Music Malaysia
- Songwriters: Malique; Joe Flizzow; Warren G; Qumran
- Producers: Qumran; Eka Shereen; Damian Shortysoul

Too Phat singles chronology
"Phat Family Anthem" (2002)	"Just a Lil' Bit" (2003)	"Ala Canggung (Do You Wanna Have a Party?)" (2003)

Warren G singles chronology
"Lookin' at You" (2001)	"Just a Lil' Bit" (2003)	"Get U Down" (2005)

Music video
- "Just a Lil' Bit" on YouTube

"Just a Lil' Bit" is a song by Malaysian hip-hop duo, Too Phat featuring American rapper, Warren G. It was released in 2003 as the lead single of their third studio album, 360°. It was co-written by duo themselves with Warren G and Qumran, and produced by Qumran. A music video was filmed to promote the single.

== Track listings ==
No.	Title	Length
1.	"Just a Lil' Bit" (Original)	5:01
2.	"Just a Lil' Bit" (Original Censored)	5:01
3.	"Just a Lil' Bit" (Remix)	5:00
4.	"Just a Lil' Bit" (Remix Censored)	5:00
5.	"Just a Lil' Bit" (Illegal Cuban Mix)	5:01
6.	"Just a Lil' Bit" (Illegal Cuban Mix Censored)	5:01
Total length:		30:59

== Personnel ==
Credits adapted from 360° album liner notes.

- Too Phat – rap
- Warren G – guest rap
- Lah Ahmad – additional vocals
- Qumran – producer, arranger, mixer (for East is Red)
- Eka Shereen – producer
- Damian Shortysoul – producer
- DJ T-Bone – DJ scratches

== Release history ==
Release history for "Just a Lil' Bit"
Region	Date	Format	Label	Ref.
Malaysia	27 January 2003	CD single, digital download, streaming	Positive Tone, EMI Music Malaysia	
