= Kartel Records =

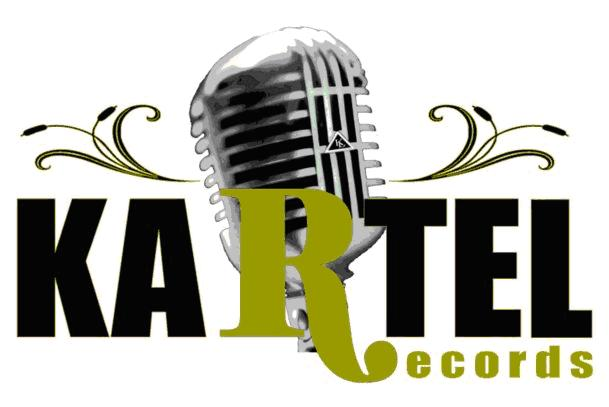
- Founded: 2005
- Founder: Joe Flizzow
- Defunct: 2019
- Distributor: Sony Music Entertainment (Malaysia)
- Genre: Hip hop
- Country of origin: Malaysia
- Location: Kuala Lumpur
- Official website: Kartellohello.com

Kartel Records Sdn Bhd is a Malaysian hip-hop record label, dealing predominantly in hip-hop/R&B music, founded by rapper/entrepreneur Joe Flizzow in 2005. In 2008, Kartel Records entered into a distribution agreement with Sony Music Entertainment Malaysia, enabling the record label to market its artists to a wider audience.

== History ==
=== Beginnings ===
After years of being signed to EMI Malaysia as an artist and member of Malaysia's hip-hop duo Too Phat, Joe Flizzow decided to take control of his music career by forming his own record label. This gave birth to Kartel Records in 2005.

=== Rebirth Into Reality ===
The label's first release was Rebirth Into Reality by Too Phat in 2005, jointly owned and in partnership with EMI Malaysia. This hugely successful release instantly made Kartel Records an award-winning label, taking the Best Local English Album and Best Album Cover awards at the 2006 Anugerah Industri Muzik (AIM).

=== President ===
In 2008, Kartel Records released President, the debut solo studio album by Joe Flizzow. President garnered various awards for Joe Flizzow including the coveted "Best Local English Album" award at the 16th annual Anugerah Industri Muzik, continuing the legacy of Kartel Records award-winning releases. President featured many notable collaborations with regional and international superstars such as KRS-One, Jin, Thaitanium, TerryTyeLee and Hady Mirza. This was very much in line with the label's mission to place Malaysia in the forefront of hip-hop music at an international level.

== Business ventures ==
=== Kartel Music Publishing ===
Kartel Records owns a music publishing company, Kartel Music Publishing, which is sub-published by EMI Music Publishing Malaysia Sdn. Bhd.

== Artists ==
- Altimet
- SonaOne
- Richard J
- DJ Iman
- Ila Damiaa
- Yung Raja
- Fariz Jabba
- Abubakarxli
- Alif (Magicpotion)

== Discography ==
Year	Information
2005	Rebirth into Reality by Too Phat: Released: December 2005; Singles: "Snap", "Dua Dunia" featuring Siti Nurhaliza
2006	Just Listen by EmceeDavid: Unreleased; Singles: "Feels So Good" featuring Joe Flizzow, "The Get Down"
2008	President by Joe Flizzow: Released: December 31, 2008; Singles: "Do It Duit", "Isabella" featuring Amy Search, "Get It Done (Air Force Ones)" featuring KRS-One, "All Around the World" featuring TerryTyeLee
2013	Havoc by Joe Flizzow: Released: December 7, 2013; Singles: "Havoc", "Apa Khabar"
2014	Kotarayaku by Altimet: Released: April 12, 2014; Singles: "Hello", "Aku Tahu" featuring Tomok, "Kotarayaku"

== Other releases ==
Information
Jian by Altimet
- Scheduled: January 2009
Heads or Tales by Micbandits
- Scheduled: TBA 2009
- Singles: "Cantik Rupamu (Hello)"
Kartel Compilation by Various Artists
- Scheduled: TBA 2009
TBA by Richard J
- Scheduled: TBA 2009
TBA by SonaOne
- Scheduled: TBA 2009

== Awards ==
=== Shout! Awards ===
- 2009
  - Flava Award (Hip Hop / R&B Awards): Joe Flizzow [Won]
  - Break Out Award (Best New Act): Joe Flizzow [Nominated]

=== Anugerah Industri Muzik (AIM) ===
- 2009
  - Best Local English Album: Joe Flizzow - President [Won]
  - Best New Artist: Joe Flizzow [Nominated]
  - Best Album Cover: Joe Flizzow - President [Nominated]
  - Best Local English Song: Joe Flizzow - "All Around the World" featuring TerryTyelee [Nominated]
  - Best Hip-Hop Song: Joe Flizzow - "Bergerak" featuring Phlowtron, "Isabella" featuring Amy Search and "Mengapa Harus Bercinta" featuring Hady Mirza [Nominated]
- 2006
  - Best Local English Album - Rebirth Into Reality (with Too Phat) [Won]
  - Best Album Cover - Rebirth Into Reality (with Too Phat) [Won]

=== Pelangi Awards (Brunei) ===
- 2009
  - Best New Group: Micbandits [Nominated]
  - Best Group: Micbandits [Nominated]
