= Harikrish Menon =

Musician, singer, songwriter

Haze
- Born: Harikrish Menon Ramachandran; 2 June 1973 (age 53)
- Origin: Kuala Lumpur, Malaysia
- Genres: Dance music, pop, R&B, jazz, electronica, urban contemporary
- Occupations: Singer, songwriter, record producer
- Instruments: Keyboards, vocals, guitar, percussion

Haze (born Harikrish Menon Ramachandran 2 June 1973, Kuala Lumpur, Malaysia) is a singer-songwriter, known for his work in the dance music genre, with hit singles such as "Changes" and "Freak".

== Musical career ==
He began his professional career at R.A.P. (Roslan Aziz Productions), a Malaysian record label owned by acclaimed music producer Roslan Aziz. He has since worked with many of Malaysia's top performing artist such as Sheila Majid, Ning Baizura, Amir Yussof, Zainal Abidin, the late Sharifah Aini and Malaysian rap sensation Too Phat just to name a few. Besides producing for local Malaysian performing artist, he has also produced albums for many performing artist around the region. Artist such as Kris Dayanti of Indonesia and Singaporean rap sensation Sheikh Haikel. Which has allowed him to develop a musical scope that covers across almost all genres. In the mid-1990s he also performed with the band Asia Beat.

He was the first Malaysian to appear on the BBC UK Dance Singles Charts, for Changes. His single Freak made the Top 10 of the National Top 100 Singles chart in the Netherlands.

== Discography ==
=== Singles ===
Year	Title	Collaborations
2002	Changes	Sandy Rivera
2003	Dreams/Through	Kings Of Tomorrow / K.O.T
2004	Dreams	Kings Of Tomorrow / K.O.T
2005	Through	Kings Of Tomorrow / K.O.T
2007	Freak	Sandy Rivera
