= ALYPH =

- Born: Muhammad Alif Abdullah; 21 September 1989 (age 37); Singapore
- Other name: Alif
- Education: Temasek Polytechnic
- Occupations: Singer; songwriter; composer; producer
- Years active: 2005–present
- Known for: SleeQ
- Spouse: Azzah Fariha Samat (m. 2014)
- Children: 2
- Musical career
- Genres: Hip hop; R&B
- Label: Def Jam South East Asia
- Formerly of: SleeQ

Muhammad Alif Abdullah (born September 21, 1989), better known as ALYPH or Alif is a Singaporean-Malay singer, performer, songwriter, composer and producer based in Malaysia. Between 2005 and 2015, Alif was active as part of the Singaporean hip hop and R&B duo, SleeQ, along with his cousin, Syarifullah/Syarif. He is the founder of the record label Black Hat Cat Records. He signed with Def Jam Recordings South East Asia in 2019.

== Education ==
ALYPH studied at Eunos Primary School and Tanjong Katong Secondary School.

== Career ==
ALYPH released a single Swipe in 2022 and then Check in 2023.

== Discography ==
=== Albums ===
- 6560 Part 1 (2015)
- 6560 Part 2 (2016)
- DETAIL (2018)
- The Storm (2025)

=== Charted songs ===
Title	Year	Peak chart positions		
Title	Year	MYS	MYS Malay	SGP
"Luar Biasa" (Ismail Izzani feat. Alif)	2018	17	1	—
"Sang Saka Biru" (with SonaOne, Joe Flizzow and Altimet)	2018	—	2	—
"Mimpi" (K-Clique feat. Alif)	2019	7	1	—
"Swipe"	2022	–	1	18
"Check"	2023	–	–	—
"Heat"	2023	—	–	—
"—" denotes release did not chart.
