= Indonesian Muslim Council =

Muslim wing of Indonesian Democratic Party

Indonesian Muslim Council (Indonesian: Majelis Muslimin Indonesia (MMI)) was the Muslim wing of the Indonesian Democratic Party. Formed by Suryadi, the third chairman of PDI, the movement aimed to accommodate santris and ulama within the party.

The organization comprised Islamic figures who had left Golkar and the United Development Party (PPP), particularly from Nahdlatul Ulama, due to dissatisfaction with their treatment in those parties. In late 1990, ten Nahdlatul Ulama figures from East Java defected from Golkar and PPP to join PDI, and their presence was accommodated in the Central Council of the Indonesian Muslim Council. One of them, K.H. Soerodji, an advisor of NU, admitted to leaving PPP after being denied nomination as a DPRD member at the 1987 elections. After joining MMI, he was chosen as its chairman and subsequently recruited 20,000 members of Nahdlatul Ulama who had left Golkar and PPP to join PDI.
