= Shure 55SH =

Professional microphone

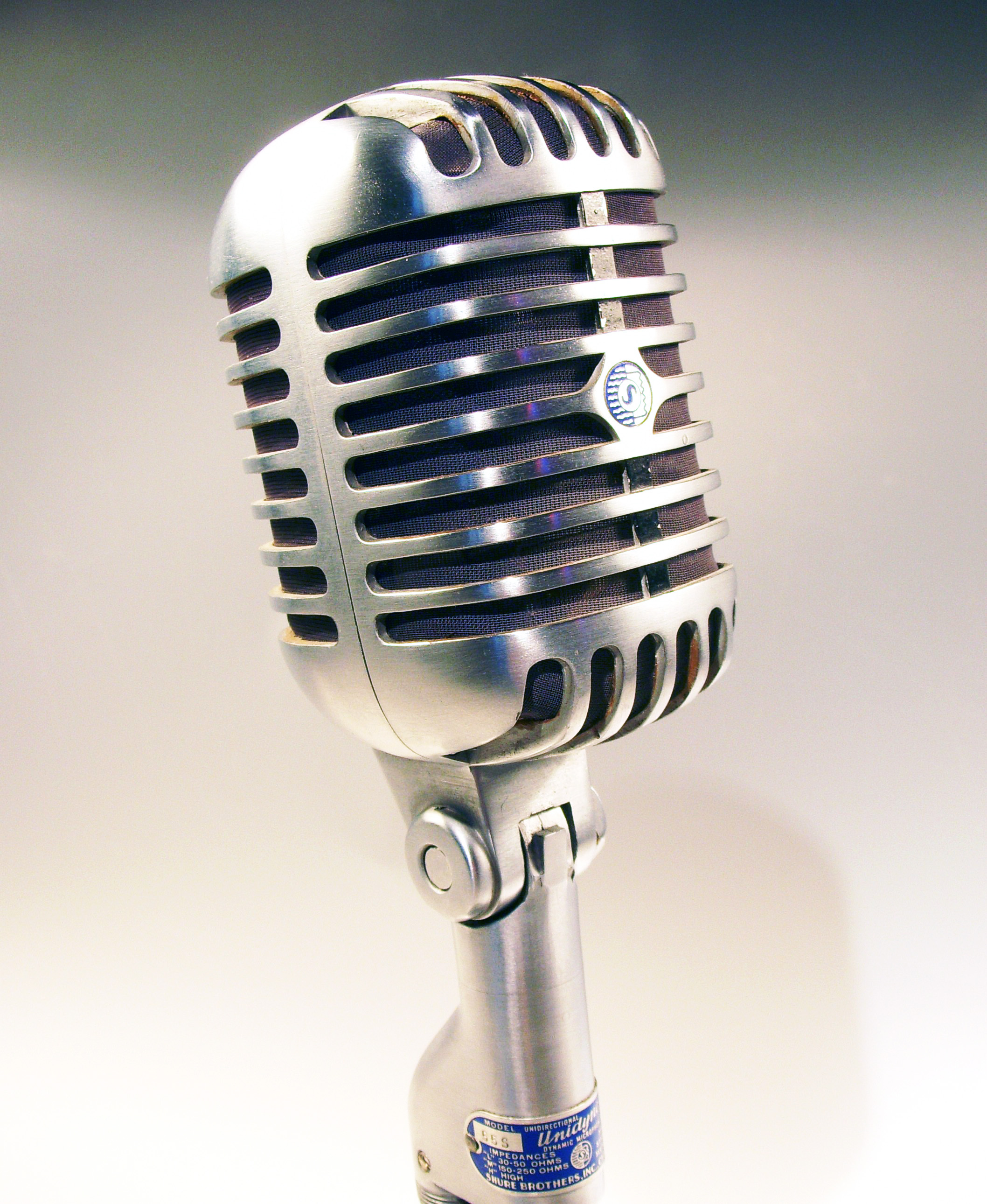
Shure 55S

The Shure 55SH is a professional cardioid dynamic microphone that has been commonly used in broadcast applications since 1939. Designed by American audio products company Shure, it has been described as "iconic" in pamphlets and reviews, after the Elvis stamp issued by the U.S. Postal Service in 1993. It was widely adopted in radio, television, and recording studios. From the 1940s until the end of the 20th century, it maintained its popularity in the professional environment. Shure designed the Unidyne transducer in 1939 and then greatly improved it in 1959, based on research and development by Shure engineer Ernie Seeler.

== Background ==
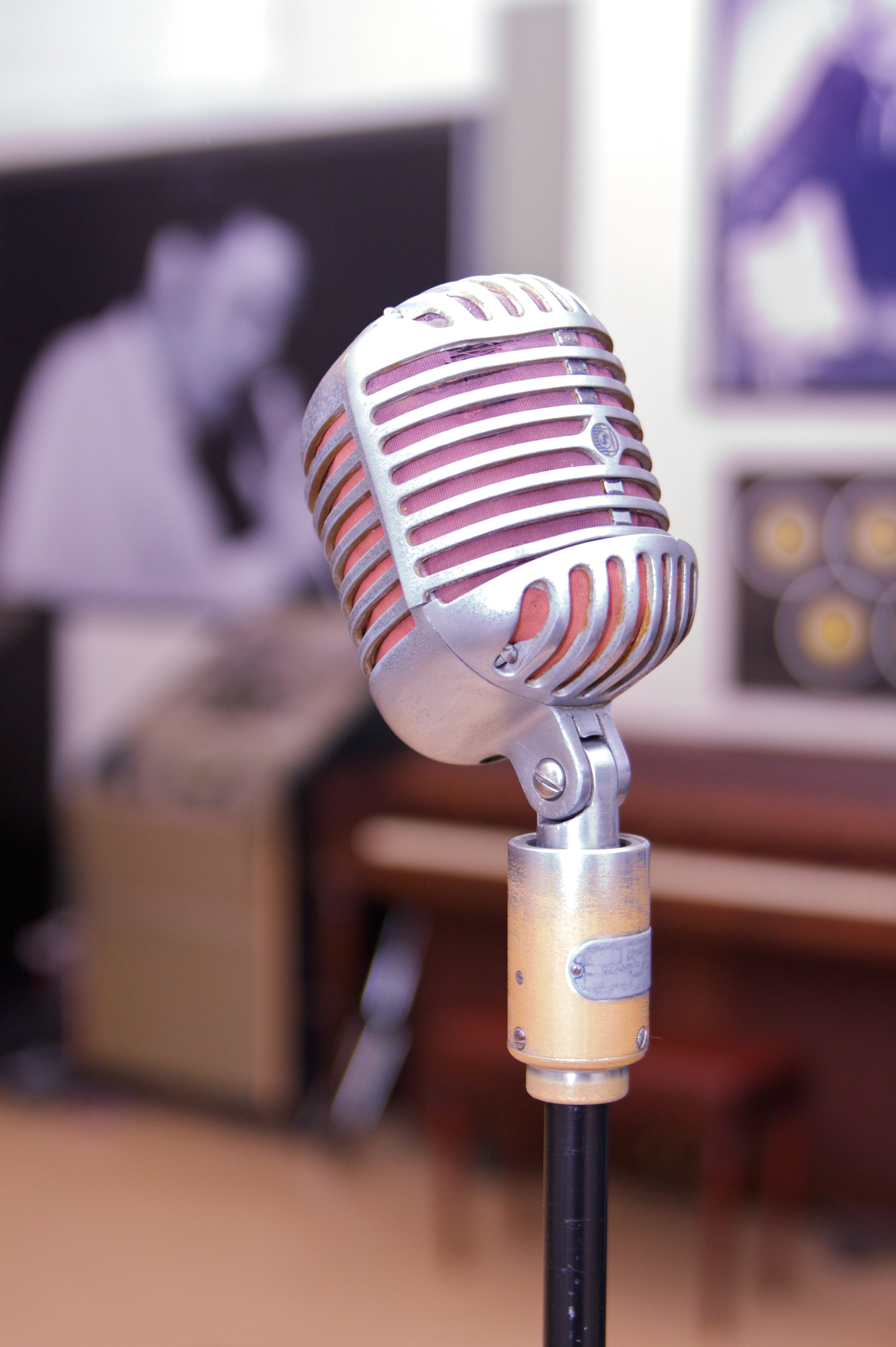
Worn by Elvis, Sun Studio

In 1931, Shure and engineer Ralph Glover began developing Shure's first microphone, and the following year the Model 33N two-button carbon microphone was introduced, making Shure one of only four microphone manufacturers in the US. Later on, in 1939, Shure introduced the Unidyne Model 55 microphone, The original Shure 55 Unidyne microphone was designed by engineer Ben Bauer and first produced in 1939.

In 1941, the United States military contracted Shure to supply microphones during World War II, and by the following year, the T-17B was the most widely used microphone by the United States Army and Navy. Shure also manufactured throat microphones, headsets, and oxygen mask, and adopted the United States military standard for all Shure microphones.

Shure began manufacturing its own products in 1932 with the introduction of the 33N two-button carbon microphone. The Model 40D, Shure's first condenser microphone, was introduced the following year, and the first in a line of crystal microphones, the Model 70, was introduced in 1935. With the introduction of the 55 Unidyne microphone in 1939, the company's offerings included carbon, condenser, crystal, and dynamic microphones. Wired and wireless microphones together represent the largest category of Shure's overall business.

== World image ==
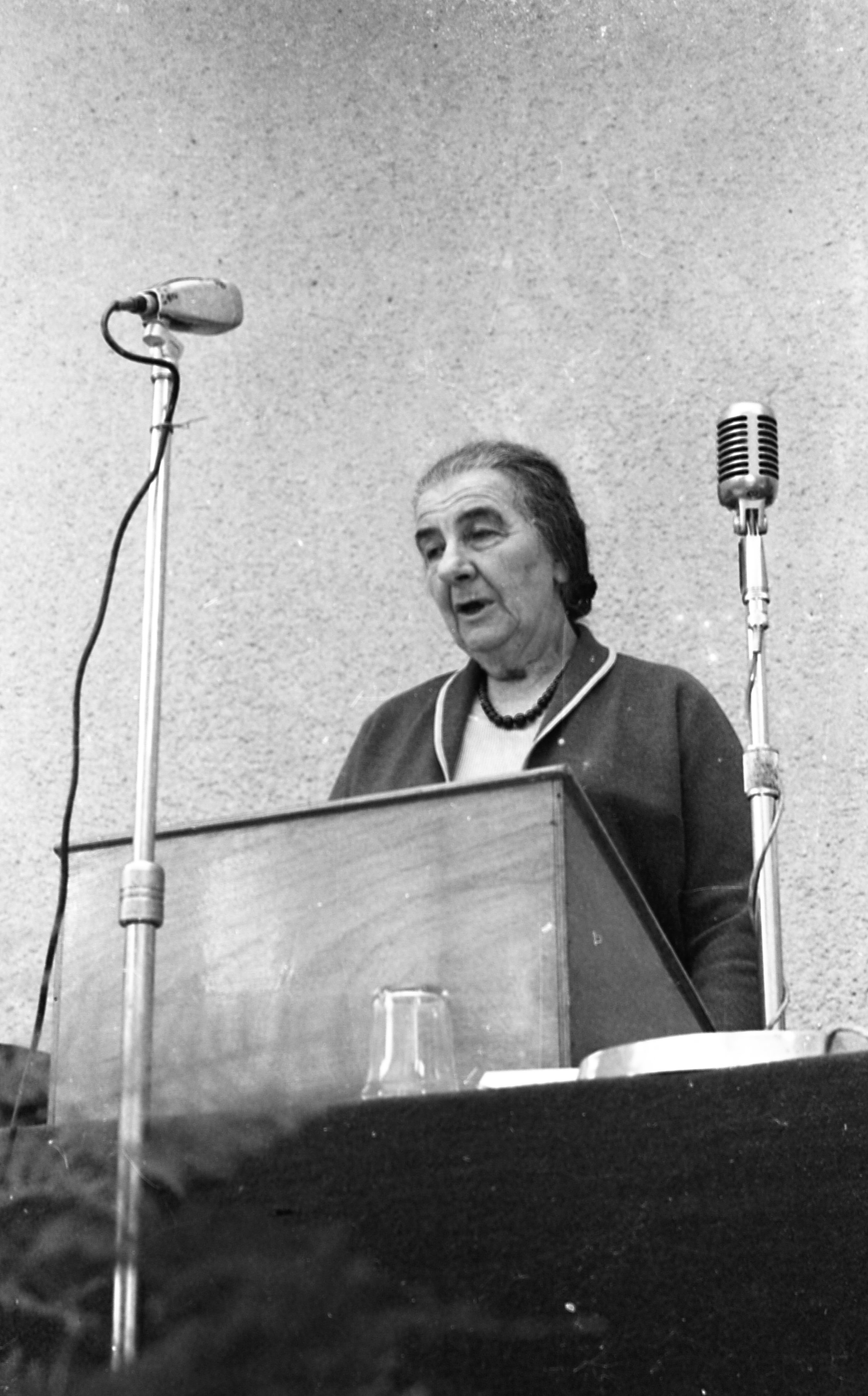
Golda Meir

Visually one of Shure's most iconic Unidyne series, the 55S, has been seen in use by heads of state and popular recording artists and performers from the 1940s through the late 20th century, including President John F. Kennedy, Golda Meir, Ella Fitzgerald, Benny Goodman and Frank Sinatra. The Model 55 Unidyne, or derivatives thereof, appear with Harry S. Truman in the photograph where he is holding the Chicago Tribune newspaper with the erroneous front-page headline "Dewey Defeats Truman". It also appears opposite Fidel Castro on the cover of the book Cuba: The Measure of a Revolution, and on the cover of the January 19, 1959, issue of Life magazine.

The 55S is sometimes referred to as the "Elvis mic" due to its frequent use by Elvis Presley, and is the microphone depicted with Elvis on the commemorative first-class Elvis stamp issued by the U.S. Postal Service in 1993. In 2008, the Unidyne Model 55 microphone was inducted into the TECnology Hall of Fame, and the following year, Shure released the 55SH Series II.

Shure designed the 55 Unidyne as a rugged public address microphone with good audio performance. It was noted for its single-element, unidirectional design, which was smaller, less susceptible to feedback, and less sensitive to ambient noise than other microphones of the time. Several variants of the original Unidyne have been produced, most notably the 55S or "Baby Unidyne". A supercardioid version, the Super 55 Deluxe Vocal Microphone, was introduced in 2009, featuring high gain before feedback and excellent off-axis rejection and further extending Unidyne's 70-plus year legacy.

== Gallery ==
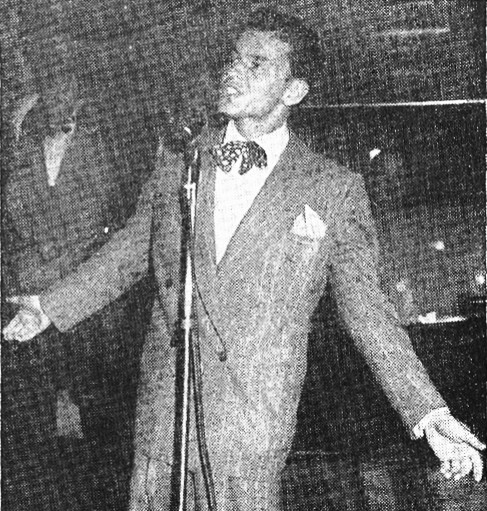
Frank Sinatra, 1945

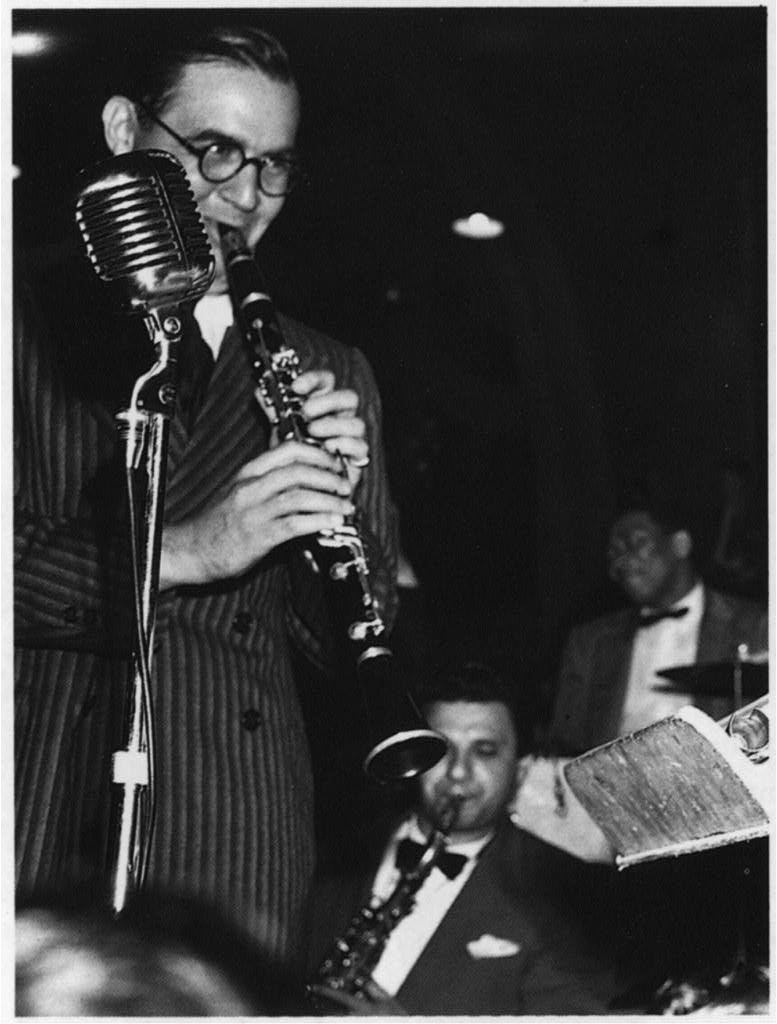
Benny Goodman, 1946

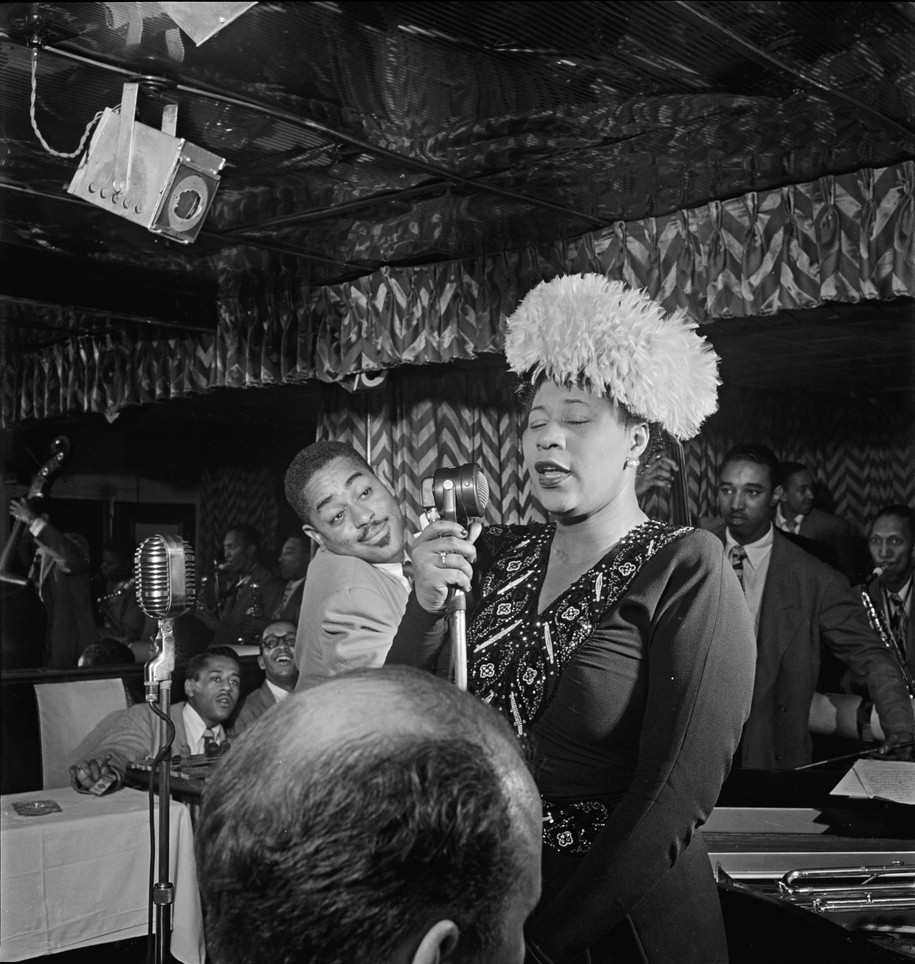
Ella Fitzgerald in September, 1947

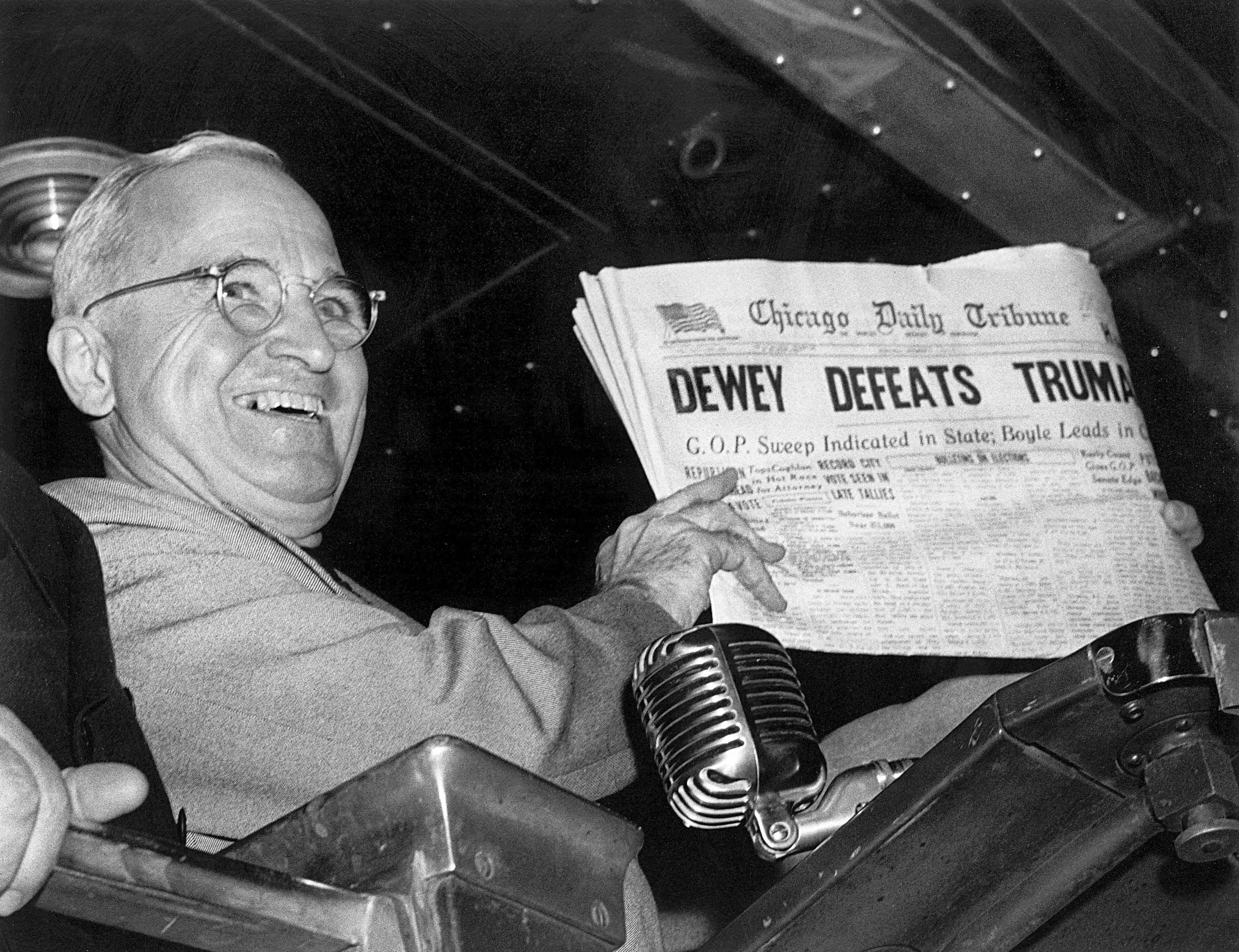
Dewey Defeats Truman, 1948

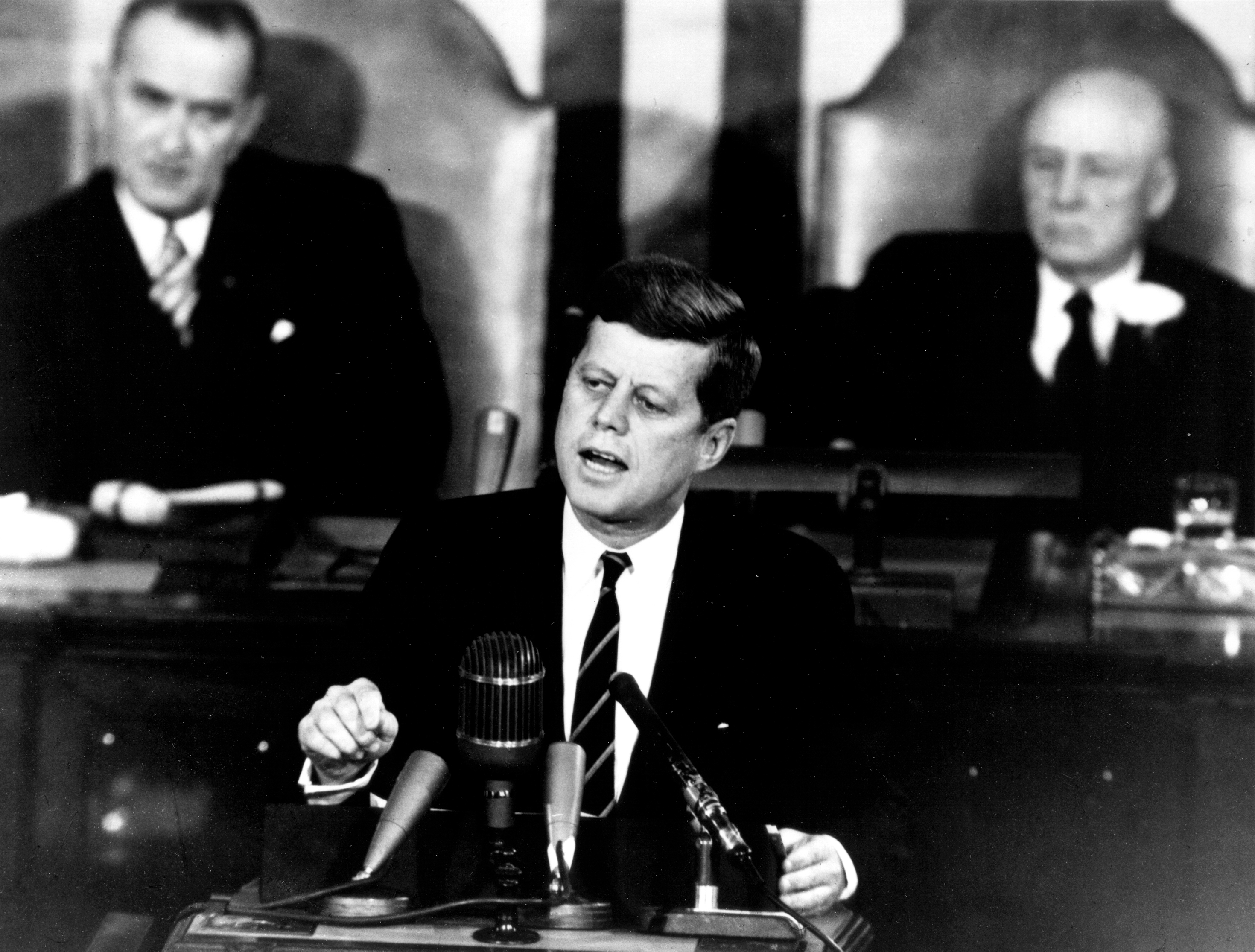
Kennedy Giving Historic Speech, Congress, 1961

== Technical specifications ==
- Frequency response: 50 to 15,000 hz
- Pattern: cardioid
- Sensitivity (at 1,000 Hz open circuit voltage): -58.0 dBV/Pa (1 Pa = 94 dB SPL)
- Impedance: EIA −150 Ω (270 Ω current)
- Polarity: Positive pressure on the diaphragm produces a positive voltage on pin 2 relative to pin 3
- Connector: 3-pin male XLR
- Switches: on off
- Weight: 0.624 kg (1.38 lb)

== Awards ==
- 1943–1946: Army-Navy "E" Award and 3 "E" Stars for Excellence in Production awarded to Shure
- The 55 Series microphones were given the "IEEE Milestone" award in 2014.
