= Inul Daratista =

Indonesian dangdut singer

Inul Daratista Inul
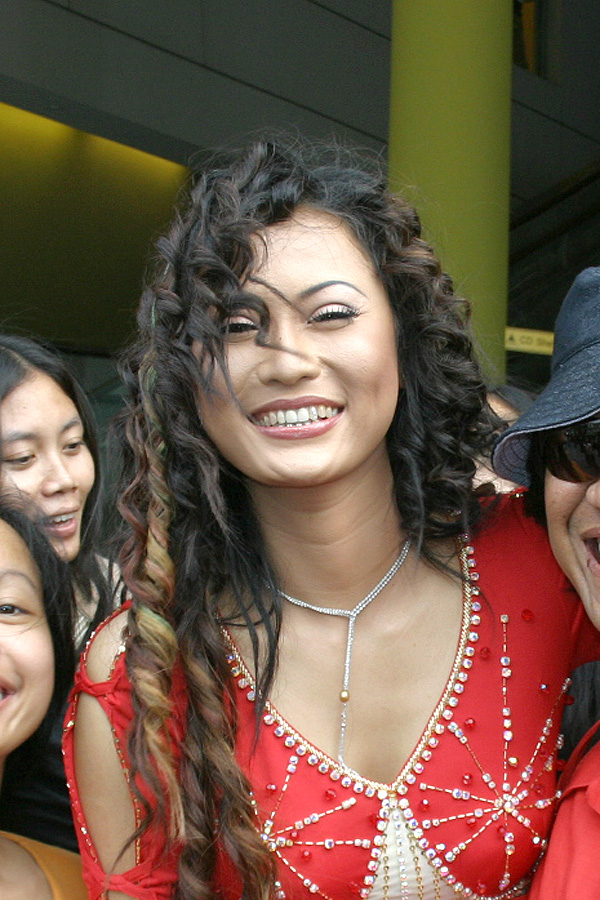
- Inul Daratista after concert in Singapore, 2004

Background information
- Also known as: Bunda Ratu
- Born: Ainur Rokhimah; 21 January 1979 (age 47); Pasuruan, East Java, Indonesia
- Genre: Dangdut
- Occupation: Singer
- Years active: 1990–present
- Spouse: Adam Suseno

Inul Daratista (born Ainur Rokhimah on 21 January 1979) is a dangdut singer and performance artist from Pasuruan, East Java, Indonesia. She became nationally famous in 2003 and is known for her suggestive dancing style, which sparked major controversy in Indonesia. "Inul" is a variation of "Ainur," her childhood pet name. As she began her musical career singing in a rock band, she adopted the stage name "Daratista."

Inul Daratista rose to national prominence after a televised January 2003 concert in Jakarta. Her dance moves, which she calls Goyang Inul, goyang-gerudi, or ngebor (lit. 'drilling'), quickly became the source of controversy due to her gyrating hip motions. Some conservative Muslim organizations such as the Indonesian Muslim Council (Indonesian: Majelis Muslimin Indonesia, abbreviated MMI) called for a ban on her concerts. She was cited as a reason to pass a national anti-pornography bill that was drafted during the height of the controversy in mid-2003 and became a law in October 2008. Inul's dance style was also criticised by other dangdut singers, most vocally Rhoma Irama, for "corrupting" the genre, though these criticisms did little to dent her popularity.

== Name ==
Inul's birth name, Ainur Rokhimah, means "eyes of blessed love". Her stage name, Inul Daratista, is often mistranslated as "the girl with breasts".

== Influences ==
Inul's idols include dangdut singer Rita Sugiarto and pop singers Paramitha Rusady, Shakira, and Jennifer Lopez.

== Personal life ==
At 16 years old and a freshman in high school, Inul married Adam Suseno, then 21, on 29 May 1995. The couple's first child, Yusuf Ivander Damares, was born on 19 May 2009.

== Discography ==
- 2003 Goyang Inul
- 2004 Separuh Nafas
- 2005 Too Phat – Rebirth into Reality
- 2006 Mau Dong
- 2006 Ash-Sholaatu
- 2008 Rasain Lho
- 2012 Buaya Buntung
- 2014 Masa Lalu
- 2015 The Best of Inul Daratista

== See also ==
- Censorship of music
