= Too Phat =

Malaysian hip-hop duo

- Origin: Kuala Lumpur, Malaysia
- Genres: Rap; hip-hop
- Years active: 1998–2007, 2010
- Labels: EMI Music Malaysia; Positive Tone; Kartel Records; Qarma Musiq
- Past members: Cairel Adrin Ibrahim (Malique); Johan Ishak (Joe Flizzow)
- Website: www.toophat.com.my (archived)

Too Phat was a Malaysian hip-hop duo from Kuala Lumpur. Formed in 1998 by Malique (born Cairel Adrin Ibrahim in Johor Bahru; 21 August 1977) and Joe Flizzow (born in Kuala Lumpur, 16 October 1979), the duo rose to fame in the late 1990s and early 2000s. After signing with Positive Tone, Too Phat achieved their biggest success with their debut album Whutthadilly? in 1999 and earned them the Best New Local English Artist at the 8th Anugerah Industri Muzik. The group's second studio album, Plan B (2001), sold 45,000 copies on the day of its release and earned them a platinum certification, a record for an album by a Malaysian hip-hop group.

Their third album, 360° spawned main singles "Just a Lil' Bit" and "Ala Canggung" as well as "Alhamdulillah". The album sold 100,000 copies, surpassing record sales of Plan B and earned them another platinum certification. Too Phat released their fourth and final studio album, Rebirth Into Reality (2005), which saws the duo collaborated with numerous Asian artists including Siti Nurhaliza, Inul Daratista, Kyla and Joey Boy. Too Phat was the most successful Malaysian hip-hop artists of the 2000s and is known as one of the few Malaysian hip hop acts who managed to create their names internationally, particularly in the Asian region. Throughout their career, the group received numerous awards and nominations including Anugerah Industri Muzik, Anugerah ERA and MTV Asia Awards. The group dissolved in 2007 with both Malique and Joe Flizzow pursue their solo careers.

== Career ==
Joe Flizzow and Malique first knew each other in a hip-hop chat group in 1998. In the late of same decade, both them and Kevin Felix @ Doctah'K formed a musical trio who later became a duo under the Positive Tone label. Their first big break came in 1999 when their first singles, "Li'l Fingaz" and "Too Phat Baby" entered normal rotation on local English-language radio.

On the back of the success of these first singles, work soon began on an album entitled Whutthadilly?. So far, Plan B has sold over 4,500,000 copies, earning double platinum status in Malaysia.

The music video for a track from Plan B, "Just a Friend", was produced in collaboration with Maxis Hotlink and debuted on Malaysian television channel NTV7. The video features cameo appearances from local artistes M. Nasir, Fauziah Latiff and Ferhad, and Malaysian track and field athlete Watson Nyambek. Most of the scenes were shot locally, in the city of Kuala Lumpur. The group controversially used their video to confront issues regarding homosexuality, addressing a topic which is usually avoided in conservative Malaysia. Too Phat have also collaborated with American hip hop artist Warren G.

In 2005, they produced their fourth and last studio album Rebirth Into Reality featuring various hip-hop artists from East Asia. The album's first single "Dua Dunia" features award-winning Malaysian singer Siti Nurhaliza. The duo went on indefinite hiatus with Malique and Joe Flizzow pursue their solo careers.

In 2010, Too Phat reunited for a short period to promote their single, "Masih Hip Hop".

== Solo career ==
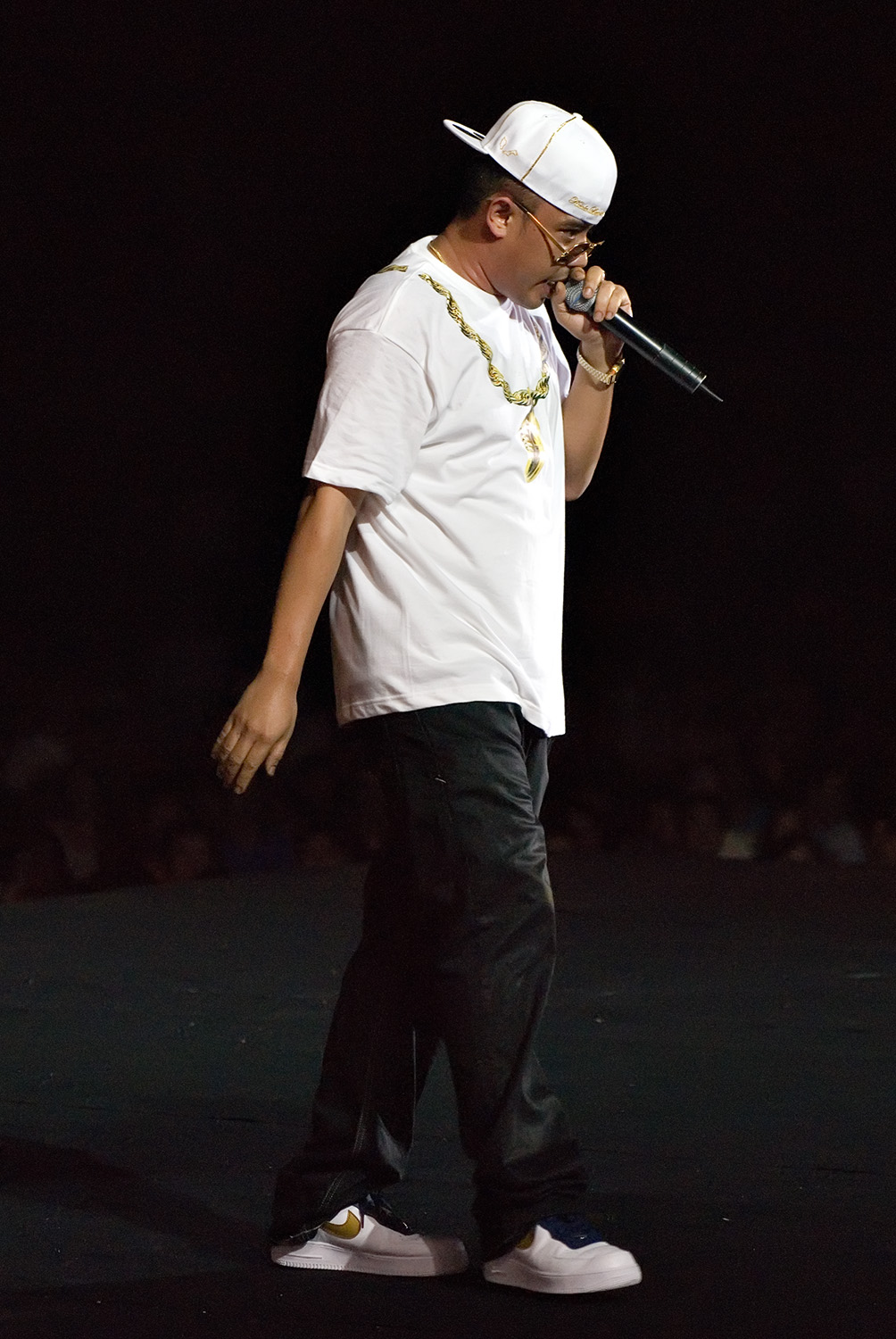
Joe Flizzow of Too Phat onstage.

The respective Phat boys started to venture off into their solo career after their last public performance for Kanye West in 2007. Malique did so with his solo album OK (2008), K.O The Mixtape (a collaboration with DJ Fuzz -2009) and TKO: Pejamkan Mata under his own label named Qarma Musiq. Rumours grew among rappers and fans that Malique would release a new English album in 2017, but this never came to pass.

Joe Flizzow released his first solo album President on 31 December 2008 under Warner Music Malaysia as the distributor and Havoc on 7 November 2013.

=== Aku Tanya Apa Khabar ===
During 2015, Anugerah Juara Lagu Award (AJL) the song Apa Khabar by Joe Flizzow (feat. SonaOne) won the top prize on that night. The song lyrics dealt with Joe reminiscing over the good memories that he had with Malique and Joe's saying hello to him. The song received mixed response at the ceremony with one side booing because the top prize was awarded to a hip hop/R&B song, which is an unpopular genre among many Malaysians. At the same time that night, long time fan of Too Phat praised Joe for inspiring nostalgic memories for them.

=== Recent developments ===
As of 2016, Joe Flizzow's projects mostly involved Kartel Records, a record label that he had founded in 2005. Numerous local and R&B artist had signed under his label with notable names like Altimet and SonaOne.

As for Malique, he has become more reclusive and prefers to keep his personal life private after the Too Phat days. Despite releasing numerous top hit collaboration tracks with other local artists such as Mantera Beradu (feat. M Nasir -2008), Senyum (feat. Najwa -2010) Aku Maafkan Kamu ( feat. Jamal Abdilah -2011), Teman Pengganti (feat. Black -2012) Malique seems to shy away from the public and declines to appear on any shows or interviews. In an interview in 2011, Malique was quoted saying him being able to sell his music without making public appearances made him feel more comfortable and he has no intentions to change that.

As of December 2016, it is announced that his new solo album may be out with the title TKO in 2016 under his own label Qarma Music. Malique intends to release an English album in 2017.

== Discography ==
=== Studio albums ===
- Whutthadilly? (1999)
- Plan B (2001)
- 360° (2003)
- Rebirth Into Reality (2005)

=== Collaborative album ===
- Phat Family (with various; 2002)

=== Compilation albums ===
- Too Phat Classics (2004)
- Too Phat: Too Furious (2006)
- Too Phat: The Greatest Hits (2007)
- The Best of Too Phat (2013)

=== Solo albums ===
- OK (Malique; 2008)
- The President (Joe Flizzow; 2009)
- K.O: The Mixtape (Malique & DJ Fuzz; 2009)
- Havoc (Joe Flizzow; 2013)
- TKO: Pejamkan Mata (Malique; 2013)

=== Singles ===
- "Li'l Fingaz"
- "Too Phat Baby"
- "Jezzebelle"
- "Anak Ayam"
- "Tell Shorty" (feat. Ruffedge & V.E.)
- "Just A Friend" (feat. V.E.)
- "You" (feat. Sharifah Aini)
- "Ala Canggung" (feat. Lil' Marissa)
- "Where My Love At"
- "Just A Li'l Bit" (feat. Warren G)
- "Alhamdulilah" (feat. Yasin, Ahli Fiqir & Dian Sastrowardoyo)
- "Dua Dunia" (feat. Siti Nurhaliza)
- "Snap"
- "KL"
- "Showtime"
- "How Me Seksi" (feat. Inul Daratista)
- "To The World Cup" - 2006
- "Feels So Good" (Emcee David ft. Joe Flizzow) - 2006
- "Jari Jemari" (Camillia ft. Joe Flizzow) - 2007
- "Get It Done" 2007
- "1000 Verses" (ALI ft. Joe Flizzow)
- "One Night Lover" (Rossa ft. Joe Flizzow) - 2012
