= Sharifah Aini =

Malaysian singer (1953–2014)

Biduanita Negara Datuk Sharifah Aini Syed Jaafar PJN (Malaysia); SMJ (Johor)
- شريفة عيني
- Born: Sharifah Aini binti Syed Jaafar; 2 July 1953; Johor Bahru, Johor, British Malaya
- Died: 5 July 2014 (aged 61); Damansara Utama, Petaling Jaya, Selangor, Malaysia
- Resting place: Bukit Kiara Muslim Cemetery, Kuala Lumpur
- Spouse: Ali Bakar (m. 1981–1982)
- Children: 1
- Musical career
- Genres: Traditional, pop, evergreen
- Occupations: Singer, actor
- Instrument: Vocal
- Years active: 1968–2014
- Label: EMI

Sharifah Aini binti Syed Jaafar (2 July 1953 – 5 July 2014), better known by her stage name Sharifah Aini, was a Malaysian singer, known as Biduanita Negara or "National Songstress" after the late Salmah Ismail (Saloma). She won first place in the Radio Television Singapore (RTS) talentime contest "Bintang RTS" competition in 1968, singing "Tiga Malam". She was famously known as Kak Pah.

In Malaysia, she was one of the most enduring artists to have recorded with EMI Malaysia. As a tribute, her name was recorded in the Malaysian Book of Records for her contribution.

== Personal life ==
Sharifah was born on 2 July 1953, in Johor, British Malaya. She grew up in Kampung Melayu Majidee, Johor Bahru, Malaysia and started her singing career there.

== Discography ==
=== First Era (EP) Albums ===
- Seri Dewi Malam (EP – 1970)
- Kekasih Pujaan (EP – 1970)
- Aku Dan Dia (EP – 1971)
- Perasaanku (EP – 1972)
- Pahit Manis (EP – 1972)
- Jangan Tinggalkan Daku (EP – 1972)
- Adat Lama Jangan Dilupa (EP – 1973)
- Inikah Manusia (EP – 1973)
- Dia Terlupa (EP – 1973)
- Kau Telah Disampingku (EP – 1974)
- Jangan Putarkan Laguku (EP – 1974)
- Sedangkan Lidah Lagi Tergigit (EP – 1974)
- Permintaan Terakhir Dan Rahsia Hati (EP – 1975)
- Manis Manis (EP – 1975)
- Surat Dari Seberang (EP – 1977)

=== First Classical Era Albums (1970s) ===
- 1972 – Dari Hati Ke Hati
- 1973 – Kenanglah Daku
- 1974 – Cahaya Keinsafan
- 1975 – Irama Cintaku
- 1976 – Sharifah Aini
- 1977 – Inilah Laguku
- 1977 – Forever And Ever
- 1978 – Inilah Laguku 2
- 1979 – Lela Manja
- 1979 – Inilah Laguku 3
- 1979 – Women in Love

=== Sensational Era Albums (1980s) ===
- 1980 – Lagu-Lagu Pujaan (10 tahun – Kompilasi)
- 1980 – Just For You
- 1980 – Malam
- 1981 – Rasa Sayang (Feeling Of Love)
- 1981 – Harum Dalam Kenangan
- 1982 – Rahsia Hati
- 1982 – Collection Plus 2 (Kompilasi)
- 1983 – Irama Dari Sekeping Hati
- 1984 – Suara Kedamaian
- 1984 – He is Beautiful To Me
- 1984 – Cahayaku
- 1985 – Dari Masa Hingga Masa 1 Dan 2 (Kompilasi)
- 1985 – 16 Lagu-Lagu Terbaik Sharifah Aini (Kompilasi)
- 1986 – Kau Yang Bernama
- 1987 – The Best Of Sharifah Aini (Kompilasi)
- 1987 – Kasih
- 1988 – pilihan Sentimental Emas (Kompilasi)
- 1988 – Sharifah Aini

=== 1990s albums ===
- 1991 – Kenangan Manis Vol 1 (Kompilasi)
- 1992 – Kenangan Manis vol 2 (Kompilasi)
- 1993 – Koleksi Klasik (Kompilasi)
- 1994 – Sharifah Aini
- 1995 – Seraut Wajah Semerdu Suara (Album Live)
- 1996 – Selamanya (Kompilasi)
- 1996 – Pilihan Klasik Aidilfitri (Album Kompilasi Raya)
- 1997 – Nostalgia Aidilfitri
- 1998 – Yayadan
- 1998 – Dewi Sukma (Album Kompilasi Sharifah Aini dan Uji Rashid)
- 1999 – Takkan Melayu Hilang Dunia
- 1999 – Seri Dewi Sharifah Aini
- 1999 – Dari Jauh Ku Pohon Maaf (Album Kompilasi Raya)

=== Millennium Era albums ===
- 2000 – Seribu Mawar
- 2000 – Dewi Intan (Inilah Laguku 1 & Inilah Laguku 2 – Terbitan semula 2 dalam 1)
- 2000 – Di Pintu Ampun...Menjelang Syawal (Album Raya)
- 2001 – Kenangan Istimewa Sharifah Aini Dan Broery Marantika (Album Khas Sharifah Aini dan Broery Marantika)
- 2001 – Alunan Sukma (Sharifah Aini dan Sudirman – Album Khas Trdisional Sharifah Aini dan Allahyarham Sudirman Haji Arshad)
- 2002 – Seri Dewi Malam: A Love Story (Album Kompilasi)
- 2002 – Woman In lLove (Album Kompilasi Inggeris Sharifah Aini)
- 2003 – Syahdu
- 2003 – Anugerah Datuk Sharifah Aini (Album Kompilasi)
- 2003 – Datuk Sharifah Aini: Syawal 1424 (Album Kompilasi Raya Datuk Sharifah Aini)
- 2004 – Koleksi Memori Datuk Sharifah Aini (Album Komplasi)
- 2005 – Memori Hit Sentimental Datuk Sharifah Aini (album Kompilasi)
- 2005 – Bukan Cinta Biasa
- 2006 – Timeless (Datuk Sharifah Aini – Album Kompilasi)

=== Hari Raya Albums ===
- 1973 – Selamat Hari Raya Aidilfitri
- 1977 – Bergembira Di Hari Raya (Menampilkan dialogue bersama Hail Amir, Uji Rashid dan Datuk D J Dave)
- 1984 – Deli Aidilfitri
- 1988 – Salam Aidilfitri
- 1997 – Nostalgia Aidilfitri
- 1999 – Dari Jauh Ku Pohon Maaf
- 2000 – Di Pintu Ampun...Menjelang Syawal
- 2003 – Datuk Sharifah Aini: Syawal 1424

=== Movie Soundtracks ===
- 1975 – Permintaan Terakhir
- 1976 – Hapuslah Air Matamu
- 1980 – Sumber Ilhamku
- 1981 – Bintang Pujaan

== Filmography ==
=== Film ===
Year	Title	Role	Notes
1976	Hapuslah Air Matamu	Aini	
1979	Sumber IIhamku	Linda	
1981	Bintang Pujaan	Rina	
2006	Diva Popular	Herself	Special appearance
2013	Penanggal	Sharifah Aminah	Cameo appearance

== Death ==
Sharifah Aini died on July 5, 2014, at Damansara Specialist Hospital, Damansara Utama in Selangor due to lung fibrosis at the age of 61. She was buried at the Bukit Kiara Muslim Cemetery, Kuala Lumpur. Her grave is unmarked in accordance with her own wishes.

== Honours ==
=== Honours of Malaysia ===
- Malaysia
  - Commander of the Order of Meritorious Service (PJN) – Datuk (2003)
- Johor
  - Companion of the Order of the Crown of Johor (SMJ) (1983)
