= Ahmad Izham Omar =

Malaysian film and music producer

Datuk Ahmad Izham Omar
- Born: 15 December 1969 (age 56); Petaling Jaya, Selangor, Malaysia
- Education: Berklee College of Music; Suffolk University; Sekolah Menengah Sains Selangor
- Occupations: Film producer; Composer; Music producer

Ahmad Izham Omar (born 15 December 1969) is a Malaysian film producer, music composer and music producer. He is Chief Explorer of Komet, a content company.

== Career ==
Omar is Chief Explorer of Komet, a content company focusing on new and progressive creative content from Southeast Asia. He was the former Executive Director of Content & Creative of Disney+ for Southeast Asia.

He was also the former chief executive office of Primeworks Studios after served for 9 years where he also become executive producer for feature films and series. He was also formerly the chief executive officer of Media Prima Television Network (MPTN), which included all four free-to-air television channels owned by the Malaysian media group including, TV3, ntv7, 8TV, and TV9.

Izham's musical career started with Positive Tone record label in 1994, producing progressive music that captured the imagination of Malaysia. He first became well known by being associated the vocal group called Innuendo which he popularized.

Izham was also the Chairman of the Communications and Multimedia Content Forum of Malaysia (CMCF) besides being a Trustee of Yayasan 1Malaysia. He had a monthly column in the New Straits Times called “For The Record” where he talks about all things music and creativity.

== Filmography ==
=== Film ===
As executive producer unless otherwise noted
Year	Title	Notes
2014	Mamak Cupcake	Story writer
2017	J Revolusi	
2018	Pulang	Also as story writer, screenplay writer and theme music (The Goodbye Theme)
2019	Sangkar	
2019	Ejen Ali: The Movie	
2021	J2: J Retribusi	
2024	Siksa Kubur	
2025	Blood Brothers	

=== Series ===
As executive producer unless otherwise noted
Year	Title	Notes
2016–2023	Ejen Ali	39 episodes
2019–2020	Alif & Sofia	73 episodes
2023	Special Force: Anarchy	7 episodes
